= Lewis G. Lee =

Sergeant Major of the US Marine Corps from 1995 to 1999

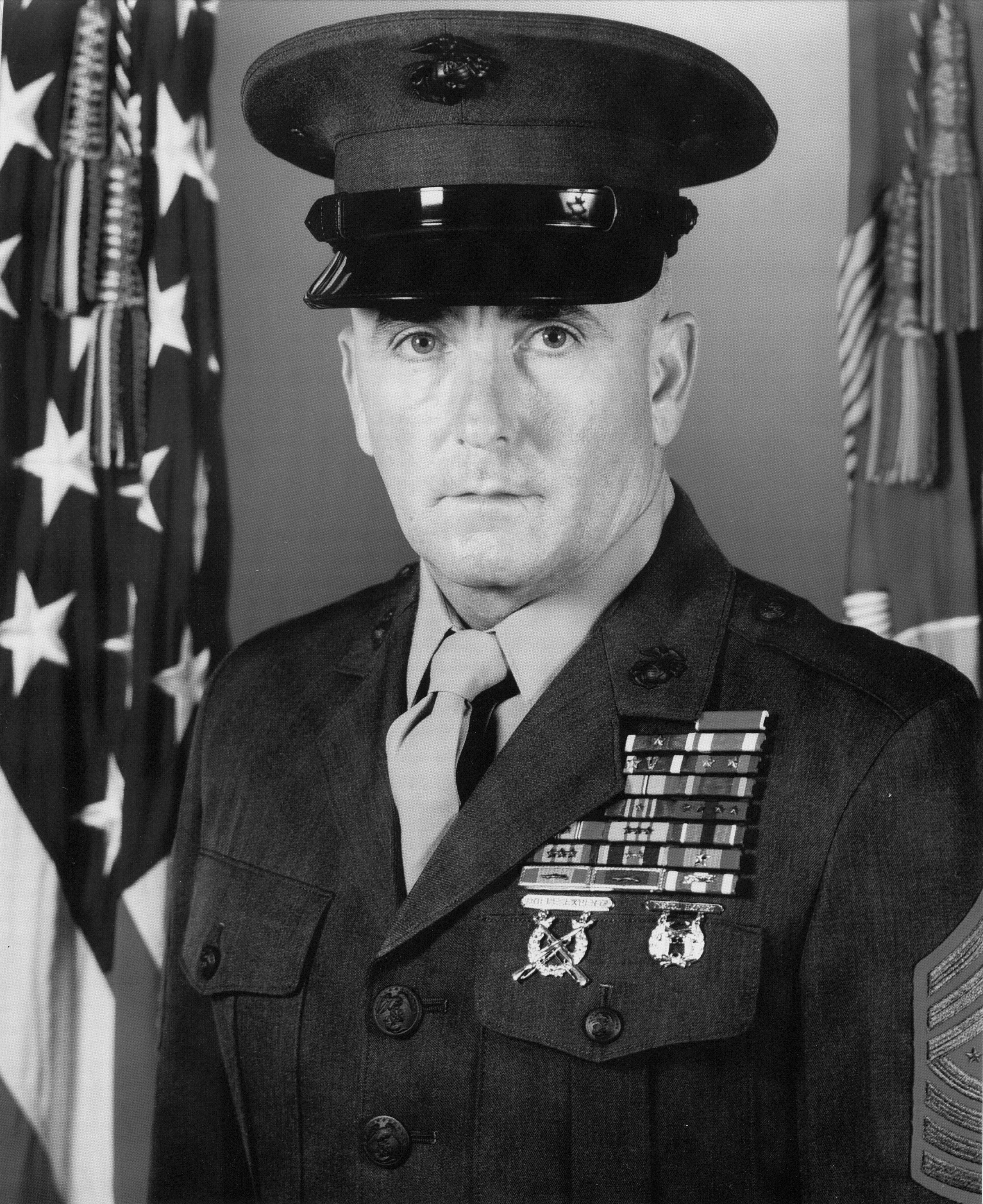
- Lee as Sergeant Major of the Marine Corps
- Born: January 19, 1950 (age 76); North Carolina, U.S.
- Military career
- Allegiance: United States
- Branch: United States Marine Corps
- Service years: 1968–1999
- Rank: Sergeant Major of the Marine Corps
- Conflicts: Vietnam War
- Awards: Navy Distinguished Service Medal; Legion of Merit; Purple Heart (2); Meritorious Service Medal; Navy and Marine Corps Commendation Medal (2); Navy and Marine Corps Achievement Medal (3)

Lewis G. Lee (born January 19, 1950) is a retired United States Marine who served as the 13th Sergeant Major of the Marine Corps from 1995 to 1999. He retired from active duty in 1999 after over 31 years of service. He was the last Sergeant Major of the Marine Corps to serve in combat in the Vietnam War.

== Early life ==
Lewis Lee was born on January 19, 1950, in North Carolina, and enlisted in the United States Marine Corps on March 28, 1968. He graduated from the Marine Corps Recruit Depot Parris Island in May 1968, and completed Infantry Training at Camp Lejeune in July 1968.

== Military career ==
In August 1968, Lee was assigned to A Company, 1st Battalion 4th Marines and deployed to South Vietnam, eventually becoming a squad leader and platoon sergeant. In June 1969, he was sent to Sub Unit #1 U.S. Naval Hospital Camp Lejeune, and remained there for seven months. In March 1970 until December 1971, he served at Weapons and Tactics Instructor with the Infantry Training Regiment at Camp Lejeune. He then served as a Drill Instructor and Instructor at DI School Staff at Parris Island.

In August 1975, Lee was sent to the 3rd Marine Division to become the Operations Chief for the division's Headquarters Battalion. The next year, he was Assistant Marine Officer Instructor in the Naval Reserve Officer Training Corps Unit at The Citadel. He became the platoon sergeant for the Officer Candidates School's NROTC Bulldog Course in the summer of 1977, and became the first sergeant the following year.

In August 1979, Lee was the first sergeant of Headquarters and Service Company, 3rd Battalion 8th Marines, 2nd Marine Division, and later moved to Lima Company. He became the Inspector/Instructor Staff First Sergeant for Company B, 4th Assault Amphibian Battalion at Jacksonville, Florida, in January 1981, until October 1983. Lee was transferred to 2nd Battalion 4th Marines at Camp Lejeune. After getting promoted to sergeant major on 1 January 1984, he became the sergeant major of 2nd Recruit Training Battalion at MCRD Parris Island in December 1985, until he moved to Marine Corps Air Station Iwakuni, Japan, to become the base sergeant major from September 1988 until February 1991.

Lee transferred to Headquarters Marine Corps in March 1991 and worked in the Personnel department until June 1995, when he was selected as the 13th Sergeant Major of the Marine Corps. He was the last Sergeant Major of the Marine Corps to have served in the Vietnam War, and retired in 1999.

== Awards and honors ==
Lee's personal decorations include:

1st Row	Navy Distinguished Service Medal	Legion of Merit		Purple Heart w/ 1 award star
2nd Row	Meritorious Service Medal	Navy and Marine Corps Commendation Medal w/ valor device & 1 award star	Navy and Marine Corps Achievement Medal w/ 2 award stars	Combat Action Ribbon
3rd Row	Navy Unit Commendation	Navy Meritorious Unit Commendation w/ 1 service star	Marine Corps Good Conduct Medal w/ 9 service stars	National Defense Service Medal w/ 1 service star
4th Row	Vietnam Service Medal w/ 3 service stars	Humanitarian Service Medal	Navy Sea Service Deployment Ribbon w/ 3 service stars	Navy & Marine Corps Overseas Service Ribbon w/ 2 service stars
5th Row	Vietnam Gallantry Cross w/ gold star	Vietnam Gallantry Cross unit citation	Vietnam Civil Actions unit citation	Vietnam Campaign Medal
Badges	Rifle Expert Badge		Pistol Expert Badge	

Military offices
Preceded by Harold G. Overstreet	Sergeant Major of the Marine Corps; 1995–1999	Succeeded by Alford L. McMichael
