= Robert E. Cleary =

United States Marine (1931–2018)

Robert Earl Cleary
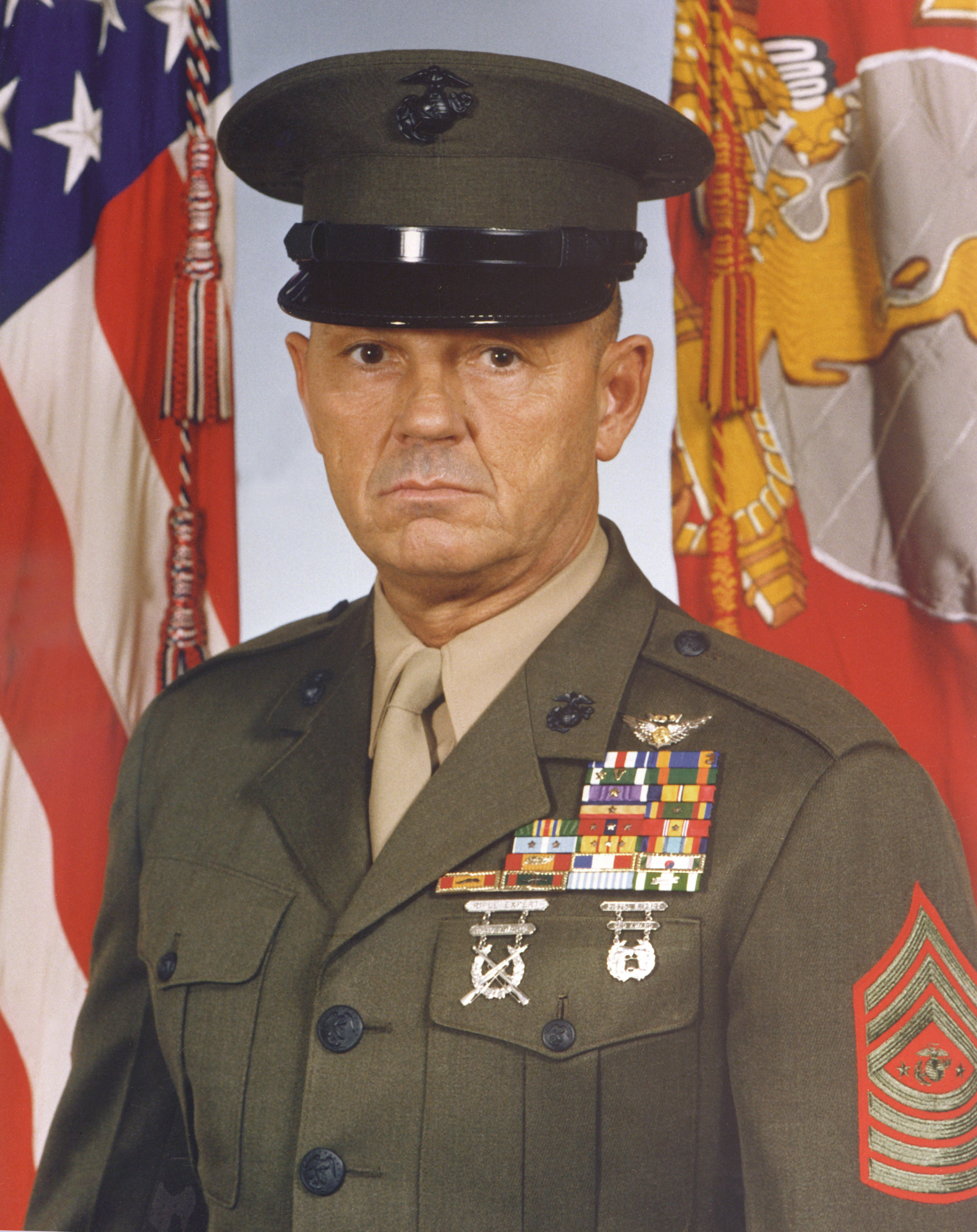
- Sergeant Major Robert E. Cleary c. 1983
- Born: June 2, 1931; Tewksbury, Massachusetts, U.S.
- Died: February 11, 2018 (aged 86); Virginia Beach, Virginia, U.S.
- Military career
- Allegiance: United States
- Branch: United States Marine Corps
- Service years: 1951–1987
- Rank: Sergeant Major
- Commands: Sergeant Major of the Marine Corps
- Conflicts: Korean War; Vietnam War
- Awards: Navy Distinguished Service Medal; Silver Star; Purple Heart (2); Air Medal (3); Navy and Marine Corps Commendation Medal (2); Navy and Marine Corps Achievement Medal

Robert Earl Cleary (June 2, 1931 – February 11, 2018) was a United States Marine who served as the 10th Sergeant Major of the Marine Corps from 1983 to 1987. He served in the Marine Corps for 36 years, including seeing combat in both the Korean War and the Vietnam War. For his actions in Vietnam, he was awarded the Silver Star, the Navy Commendation Medal, and two Purple Hearts. He was the last Sergeant Major of the Marine Corps to have served in the Korean War.

== Personal life ==
Robert Earl Cleary was born in Tewksbury, Massachusetts, on 2 June 1931, and graduated from Holyoke Trade High School in May 1949. He enlisted in the United States Marine Corps in 1951 and rose through the ranks to the highest enlisted rank – Sergeant Major of the Marine Corps. He retired in 1987. Cleary died on February 11, 2018.

== Military service ==
Soon after the Korean War began, Cleary enlisted in the United States Marine Corps on 24 October 1951. Years later, Cleary said: "If I was going to join, I wanted to join what I still feel is one of the best outfits in the world – the Marines. We're the 911 of the United States of America." He underwent recruit training at Marine Corps Recruit Depot Parris Island, then attended a nine-week Demolition Specialist Course at Schools Battalion, Marine Corps Base Camp Lejeune, where he was promoted to private first class. Upon completion of the school, he was assigned as the Battalion Demolition Specialist, Company B, 7th Engineer Battalion at Marine Corps Base Camp Pendleton. Promoted to corporal, he remained with the 7th Engineer Battalion until April 1953.

Cleary transferred overseas, where he joined the 1st Marine Division in Korea, as a Squad Leader and Right Guide with Company I, 3rd Battalion. While in this assignment, he was promoted to sergeant. Returning from overseas, he reported to the 1st Rifle Company at the Navy and Marine Corps Reserve Training Center, Springfield, Massachusetts. In early 1958, he returned to Camp Pendleton, for duty as a military policeman with the Military Police Company.

In May 1958, he was promoted to staff sergeant, and continued to serve in this assignment until April 1961, when he transferred to Marine Corps Recruit Depot San Diego for duty as a drill instructor.

Upon completion of his tour as a drill instructor, Sergeant Major Cleary joined Headquarters and Service Company, 2nd Battalion 5th Marines for duty as a section leader, and later, platoon sergeant in the 81 mm Motor Platoon. In February 1965, he transferred to H&S Company, 3rd Battalion, 3rd Marine Division, as a platoon sergeant and platoon leader.

This assignment was followed by his first tour in Vietnam as a platoon leader, Company G, 2nd Battalion 1st Marines, where he was promoted to gunnery sergeant. In August 1966, he transferred to Company F, 2nd Battalion 27th Marines, 5th Marine Division, for duty as Company Gunnery Sergeant. For his combat service in Vietnam, he was awarded the Silver Star, the Navy Commendation Medal with valor device, and two awards of the Purple Heart.

He returned to San Diego for a short tour as a drill instructor in August 1967, at which time he was selected for promotion to first sergeant. He was reassigned to the 27th Marine Regiment as the Company First Sergeant. During March 1968, he returned to Vietnam, serving as the First Sergeant of Battery C, 1st LAAM Battalion, MACC-19, 1st Marine Aircraft Wing. Subsequently, he served as Company First Sergeant of Company G, 28th Marine Regiment.

Cleary then reported to H&S Company, 2nd Battalion 7th Marines as the Company First Sergeant, followed by his third tour in Vietnam as the Squadron Sergeant Major of HMM-165. Upon his return from overseas in May 1973, he was assigned to VMA-223 at Marine Corps Air Station Yuma, where he attained his present grade and served as the Squadron Sergeant Major. In September, he was reassigned to the 2nd LAAM Battalion.

Cleary reported to Headquarters Marine Corps in September 1974 for duty as the Battalion Sergeant Major of Marine Security Guard Battalion, followed by duty as Personnel Sergeant Major. His next assignment was as the 3rd Marine Division Sergeant Major in July 1979, then returned to Marine Security Guard Battalion.

On 1 January 1982, Cleary was selected as the Sergeant Major of Marine Corps Development and Education Command in Quantico, Virginia. He was selected as the 10th Sergeant Major of the Marine Corps on 25 May 1983, and assumed the post on 28 June 1983. He retired in 1987.

== Awards and honors ==
Cleary's military decorations include:

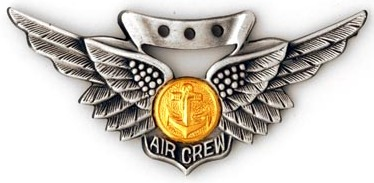

Marine Combat Aircrew Badge w/ 3 gold stars
1st Row	Navy Distinguished Service Medal	Silver Star		Purple Heart w/ 1 award star
2nd Row	Air Medal w/ Strike/Flight numeral "3"	Navy and Marine Corps Commendation Medal w/ valor device & 1 award star	Navy and Marine Corps Achievement Medal	Combat Action Ribbon
3rd Row	Navy Presidential Unit Citation w/ 1 service star	Navy Unit Commendation w/ 1 service star	Navy Meritorious Unit Commendation	Marine Corps Good Conduct Medal w/ 7 service stars
4th Row	National Defense Service Medal w/ 1 service star	Korean Service Medal w/ 2 service stars	Vietnam Service Medal w/ 7 service stars	Navy Sea Service Deployment Ribbon
5th Row	Philippine Presidential Unit Citation	Korean Presidential Unit Citation	Vietnam Presidential Unit Citation	Vietnam Gallantry Cross unit citation
6th Row	Vietnam Civil Actions unit citation	United Nations Korea Medal	Vietnam Campaign Medal	Korean War Service Medal
Badges	Rifle Expert Badge		Pistol Expert Badge	

- 8 Service stripes.

Military offices
Preceded by Leland D. Crawford	Sergeant Major of the Marine Corps; 1983–1987	Succeeded by David W. Sommers
