= Leland D. Crawford =

US Marine Corps Major (1930–1993)

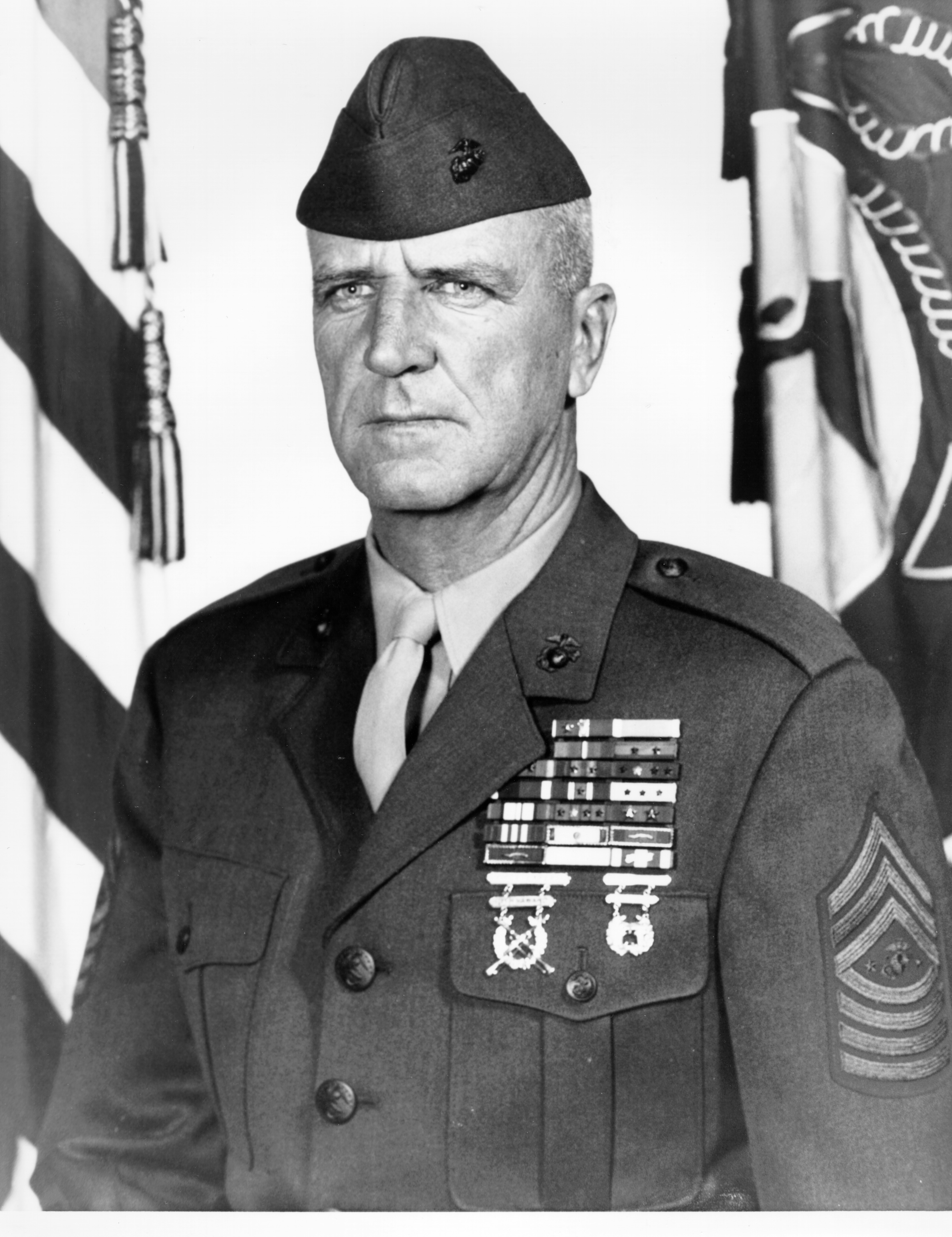
- Sergeant Major Leland D. Crawford c. 1979
- Born: February 16, 1930; Sharon, West Virginia, U.S.
- Died: February 16, 1993 (aged 63); San Diego, California, U.S.
- Military career
- Allegiance: United States
- Branch: United States Marine Corps
- Service years: 1951–1983
- Rank: Sergeant Major
- Commands: Sergeant Major of the Marine Corps
- Conflicts: Korean War; Vietnam War
- Awards: Navy Distinguished Service Medal; Bronze Star Medal (2); Purple Heart

Leland D. Crawford (February 16, 1930 – February 16, 1993) was a United States Marine who served as the 9th Sergeant Major of the Marine Corps from 1979 to 1983.

== Early life and training ==
Leland Crawford was born in Sharon, West Virginia on 16 February 1930. He attended East Bank (West Virginia) High School and later graduated from high school on Okinawa, Japan. He enlisted in the United States Marine Corps on 26 September 1951 and underwent recruit training at Parris Island, South Carolina.

== Military career ==
=== Early assignments ===
Following recruit training, Crawford was assigned to Infantry Training School, Marine Corps Base Camp Pendleton, California. Upon completion of his training, he was assigned to the 1st Marine Division in Korea, where he served as a rifleman and artillery man until July 1953. He then reported to the 2nd Marine Division, Camp Lejeune, North Carolina.

In June 1956, Crawford was assigned to his first tour of duty as a drill instructor at Parris Island where he remained until October 1958. He was then assigned to the 1st Marine Brigade in Hawaii, remaining there until October 1961. He returned to drill instructor duty, this time at Marine Corps Recruit Depot San Diego, California, until February 1964. After this tour, he was transferred to Marine Corps Air Ground Combat Center Twentynine Palms, California, as a gunnery sergeant with 4th Battalion 11th Marines.

=== First sergeant ===
Crawford joined the 3rd Marine Division on Okinawa in February 1965, and the following month sailed for Vietnam. In March 1966, he returned to Twentynine Palms, where he was promoted to first sergeant. He served as First Sergeant for Headquarters Company, Force Troops until 1967. Returning to Vietnam, he served as a Company First Sergeant, 1st Battalion 4th Marines. During this tour he earned the Bronze Star with Combat "V" and gold star in lieu of second award; and later a Purple Heart for wounds received on 11 June 1968.

Crawford was then transferred to Marine Barracks, Washington, D.C., as Company First Sergeant, Ceremonial Guard Company from October 1968 to December 1970. He again returned to Vietnam to serve as First Sergeant, Company D, 1st Battalion 1st Marines.

=== Sergeant major ===
In May 1971, Crawford returned to Camp Pendleton, where he was promoted to sergeant major. He was then assigned as sergeant major of 2nd Battalion 1st Marines until April 1974. He again returned to Marine Corps Recruit Depot, San Diego to serve as Sergeant Major of the 1st Recruit Training Battalion until January 1976. The following year he served as the Group Sergeant Major of Marine Air Control Group 18 on Okinawa. He reported back to the 1st Marine Division in February 1977 and became sergeant major of the 11th Marine Regiment.

In May 1979, Crawford became the sergeant major of the 1st Marine Division and remained in that billet until his selection as the 9th Sergeant Major of the Marine Corps. He served in that post from 15 August 1979 until his retirement on 30 June 1983. Crawford died on February 16, 1993, on his birthday, in San Diego.

== Awards and honors ==
Crawford's military decorations include:

1st Row	Navy Distinguished Service Medal			
2nd Row	Bronze Star w/ valor device & 1 award star	Purple Heart	Combat Action Ribbon	Navy Presidential Unit Citation w/ 2 service stars
3rd Row	Navy Unit Commendation w/ 2 award stars	Navy Meritorious Unit Commendation w/ 2 service stars	Marine Corps Good Conduct Medal w/ 8 service stars	Navy Occupation Service Medal
4th Row	National Defense Service Medal w/ 1 service star	Korean Service Medal w/ 3 service stars	Armed Forces Expeditionary Medal	Vietnam Service Medal w/ 8 service stars
5th Row	Vietnam Gallantry Cross w/ silver & bronze stars	Vietnam Armed Forces Honor Medal, 2nd class	Korean Presidential Unit Citation	Vietnam Gallantry Cross unit citation
6th Row	Vietnam Civil Actions unit citation	United Nations Korea Medal	Vietnam Campaign Medal	Korean War Service Medal
Badges	Rifle Expert Badge		Pistol Expert Badge	

Military offices
Preceded by John R. Massaro	Sergeant Major of the Marine Corps; 1979–1983	Succeeded by Robert E. Cleary
