= David W. Sommers =

11th Sergeant Major of US Marine Corps

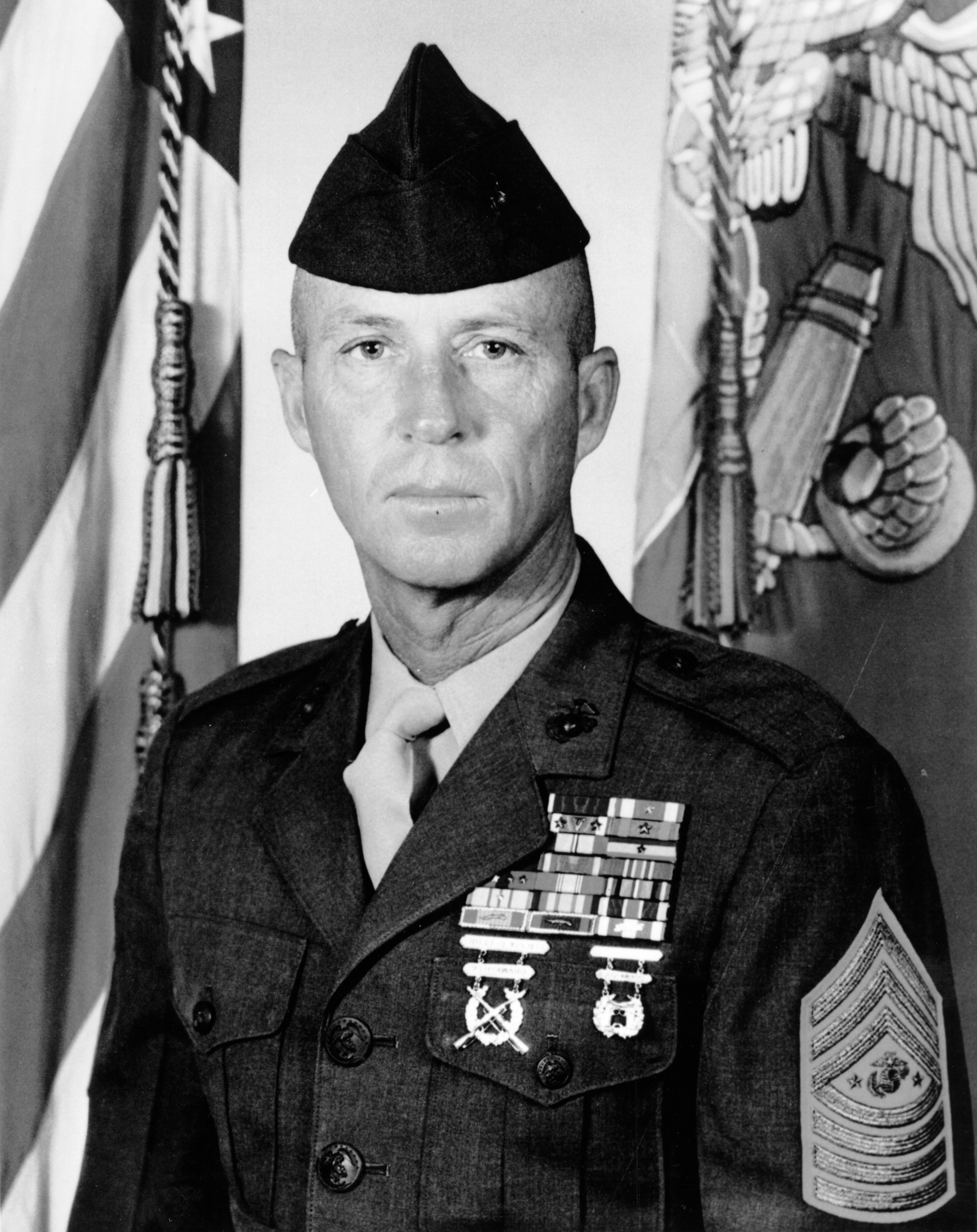
- Sergeant Major David W. Sommers c. 1987
- Born: February 18, 1943 (age 83); St. Louis, Missouri, U.S.
- Military career
- Allegiance: United States
- Branch: United States Marine Corps
- Service years: 1960–1991
- Rank: Sergeant Major
- Commands: Sergeant Major of the Marine Corps
- Conflicts: Vietnam War
- Awards: Navy Distinguished Service Medal; Legion of Merit; Purple Heart; Meritorious Service Medal (2); Navy and Marine Corps Commendation Medal (3); Navy and Marine Corps Achievement Medal (2)
- Other work: President & CEO, Non-Commissioned Officers Association

David W. Sommers (born February 18, 1943) is a retired United States Marine who served as the 11th Sergeant Major of the Marine Corps from 1987 to 1991.

== Military career ==
David Sommers was born in St. Louis, Missouri, on February 18, 1943, and attended Bishop DuBourg High School. He enlisted in the United States Marine Corps on March 25, 1960, and underwent recruit training at Marine Corps Recruit Depot San Diego, then attended infantry training at Marine Corps Base Camp Pendleton. Upon the completion of training, he was assigned as a Browning Automatic Rifleman with Company E, 2nd Battalion 1st Marines at Camp Pendleton. While with Company E, he was promoted to private first class, lance corporal, and corporal and served as a fireteam and squad leader.

Transferring overseas with the 1st Battalion 9th Marines, Sommers served as a squad leader and platoon guide for Company D. Returning from overseas, he reported to The Basic School, at Marine Corps Base Quantico, where he was assigned as a Hand-to-Hand Combat and Water Survival Instructor. While in this assignment, he was promoted to sergeant. In 1964, he was transferred to Hawaii and assigned to Company K, 3rd Battalion 4th Marines, (then part of the 1st Marine Brigade) as a squad leader and subsequently deployed with that unit to the Republic of Vietnam in March 1965. During May of that year, he was assigned to the first Combined Action Company to be formed in Vietnam. He served as a squad leader and platoon commander of the Popular Forces Platoon. For his combat service in Vietnam, Sommers was awarded the Purple Heart and Navy Commendation Medal with Combat "V".

In April 1966, Sommers was assigned to Marine Corps Recruit Depot Parris Island for a tour as a drill instructor with Company K, 2nd Recruit Training Battalion. While in this assignment, he was promoted to staff sergeant. In 1968, he returned to Vietnam for a second tour, serving as Company Gunnery Sergeant of Headquarters Company, 7th Marine Regiment. He transferred back to Parris Island the following year for duty as a Senior Drill Instructor with Company E, 2nd Recruit Training Battalion. Upon promotion to gunnery sergeant, he was assigned to the Drill Instructor School and served as Drill Master.

From December 1973 until February 1974, Sommers attended the Marine Security Guard School, and upon graduation, was assigned to the American Embassy in Caracas, Venezuela, as Noncommissioned Officer-in-Change of the Marine Detachment. He was transferred to Henderson Hall, in Arlington, Virginia, in August 1975, to serve as Instructor and Chief instructor of the Marine Security Guard School. While in this assignment, he was promoted to master sergeant and later redesignated to the rank of first sergeant. During August 1977, he reported to the 3rd Force Service Support Group on Okinawa, where he was assigned to the 9th Engineer Support Battalion. Ordered back to Camp Pendleton, he was assigned as the First Sergeant of the Marine Corps Tactical Systems Support Activity. He was promoted to sergeant major in October 1980, and returned to the MCRD San Diego as the Sergeant Major of the 2nd Recruit Training Battalion.

In June 1982, Sommers was assigned to Marine Corps Base Camp Lejeune as the Sergeant Major of 1st Battalion 10th Marines. Ordered back to Quantico in December 1983, he served as the Sergeant Major of The Basic School. He then reported to the Marine Corps Air Ground Combat Center Twentynine Palms for duty in the 7th Marine Amphibious Brigade in July 1985. Sommers was assigned as the first enlisted Director of the Staff Noncommissioned Officer Academy at the Marine Corps Combat Development Command in Quantico in June 1987. He was selected as the 11th Sergeant Major of the Marine Corps on June 18, 1987, and assumed the post on June 26, 1987.

Sommers also sits on the Board of Advisors for Veterans Direct.

== Awards and decorations ==
Sommers' military decorations include:

1st Row	Navy Distinguished Service Medal	Legion of Merit		Purple Heart
2nd Row	Meritorious Service Medal w/ 1 gold award star	Navy and Marine Corps Commendation Medal w/ 2 award stars & Combat V	Navy and Marine Corps Achievement Medal w/ 1 award star	Combat Action Ribbon
3rd Row	Navy Presidential Unit Citation w/ 1 service star	Navy Unit Commendation	Navy Meritorious Unit Commendation	Marine Corps Good Conduct Medal w/ 8 service stars
4th Row	National Defense Service Medal w/ 1 service star	Armed Forces Expeditionary Medal	Vietnam Service Medal w/ 2 service stars	Navy Sea Service Deployment Ribbon w/ 1 service star
5th Row	Navy & Marine Corps Overseas Service Ribbon	Vietnam Gallantry Cross unit citation	Vietnam Civil Actions unit citation	Vietnam Campaign Medal
Badges	Rifle Expert Badge		Pistol Expert Badge	

- 7 Service stripes.

Military offices
Preceded by Robert E. Cleary	Sergeant Major of the Marine Corps; 1987–1991	Succeeded by Harold G. Overstreet
