= Harold G. Overstreet =

United States Marine

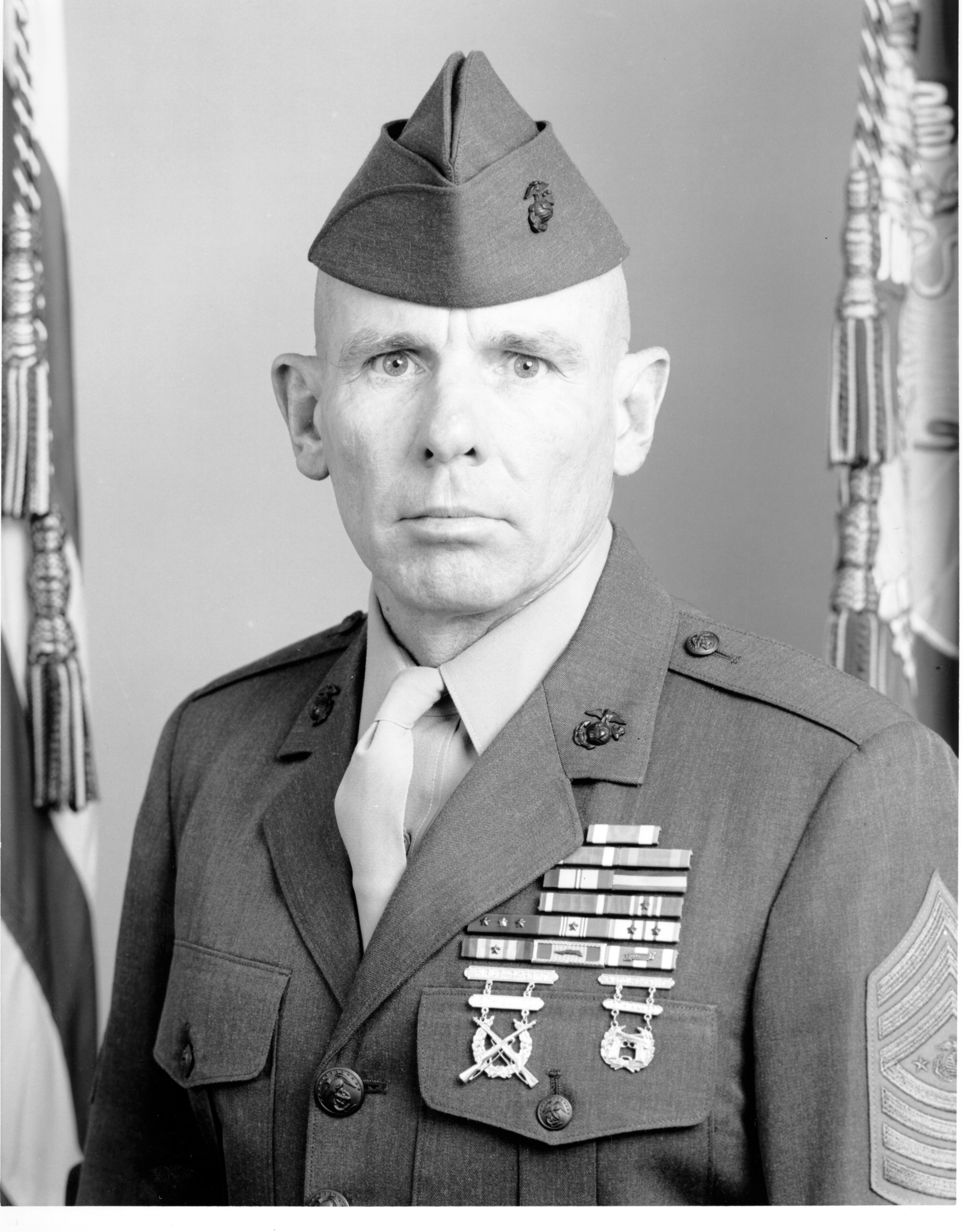
- Sergeant Major Harold G. Overstreet c. 1991
- Born: December 1944 (age 81); Houston, Texas, U.S.
- Military career
- Allegiance: United States
- Branch: United States Marine Corps
- Service years: 1966–1995
- Rank: Sergeant Major
- Commands: Sergeant Major of the Marine Corps
- Conflicts: Vietnam War
- Awards: Meritorious Service Medal; Navy and Marine Corps Commendation Medal; Navy and Marine Corps Achievement Medal
- Other work: Non-Commissioned Officers Association (NCOA), President; Veterans Direct Inc., President & CEO

Harold G. Overstreet (born December 1944) is a retired United States Marine who served as the 12th Sergeant Major of the Marine Corps from 1991 to 1995.

== Military career ==
Overstreet was born in December 1944 in Houston, Texas. He entered the United States Marine Corps in June 1966 and completed recruit training at Marine Corps Recruit Depot San Diego, followed by Basic Infantry Training School at Marine Corps Base Camp Pendleton.

Upon completion of training, Overstreet reported to staging battalion at Camp Pendleton, for further assignment to the 1st Military Police Battalion, 3rd Marine Division, Republic of Vietnam. Returning to the states, he was reassigned to the infantry training regiment at Camp Pendleton. He subsequently completed successful tours on the inspector-instructor staff, Wichita, Kansas; recruiting duty in Des Moines, Iowa, and Detroit, Michigan; and finally returned to MCRD San Diego in various drill instructor roles: junior drill instructor, senior drill instructor, series gunnery sergeant, and chief instructor. Reassigned to the Drill Instructor School, he was an instructor, drill master, and chief instructor.

After completing First Sergeant School, Overstreet was assigned to Special Projects at Drill Instructor School, where he completely transferred the Drill Manual onto videotape for more effective use during instructional periods. His promotion to first sergeant in February 1979 led to his second assignment on Okinawa as the first sergeant for Headquarters and Service Company, 9th Engineer Support Battalion. Upon his return from overseas, he was the first sergeant of both Companies B and C, 1st Battalion 4th Marines at Marine Corps Air Ground Combat Center Twentynine Palms.

Promoted to sergeant major in October 1983, Overstreet became the inspector sergeant major at MCAGCC Twentynine Palms. Returning to Marine Corps Recruit Depot San Diego, he served as a battalion and regimental sergeant major in the Recruit Training Regiment. Transferring to Marine Corps Base Camp Lejeune, he served as the 6th Marine Regiment's sergeant major. This assignment was followed by duty as sergeant major for the 12th Marine Regiment, on Okinawa. On 6 April 1990, Sergeant Major Overstreet was posted as depot sergeant major at San Diego. In April 1991, he was appointed as the Marine Corps' 12th Sergeant Major, a position he held until his retirement on June 30, 1995.

== Later life ==
In February 2007, Overstreet founded Veterans Direct Inc., a Texas (C) corporation and launched Veteran Caskets. In 2024 he co-founded the Red Star Foundation, an IRS approved 501c3 non-profit charity. He is also on the board of directors for the Young Marines and the Executive Director of Veteran Forces. He currently serves on the board of directors for the Scholastic Shooting Sports Foundation.

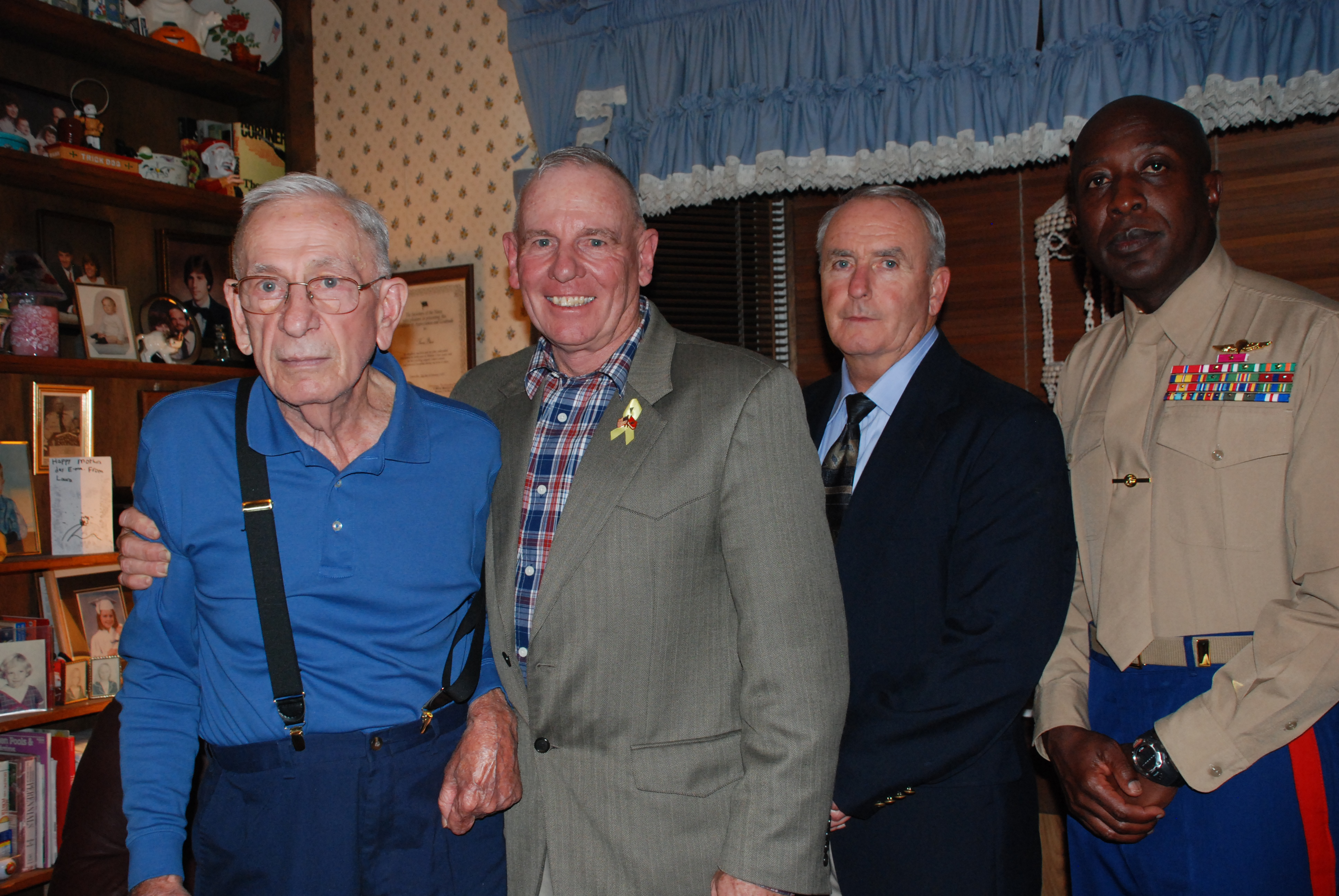
Former Sergeants Major of the Marine Corps in 2009: Henry H. Black, 7th SMMC; Harold G. Overstreet, 12th SMMC; Lewis G. Lee, 13th SMMC; and Carlton W. Kent, the 16th,

== Awards and decorations ==
Sergeant Major Overstreet's personal decorations include:

Meritorious Service Medal
Navy and Marine Corps Commendation Medal	Navy and Marine Corps Achievement Medal	Combat Action Ribbon	Navy Presidential Unit Citation
Navy Unit Commendation	Navy Meritorious Unit Commendation w/ 1 service star	Marine Corps Good Conduct Medal w/ 8 service stars	National Defense Service Medal w/ 1 service star
Vietnam Service Medal w/ 2 service stars	Navy Sea Service Deployment Ribbon w/ 1 service star	Vietnam Gallantry Cross unit citation	Vietnam Campaign Medal
Rifle Expert Badge		Pistol Expert Badge	

- 7 Service stripes.

Military offices
Preceded by David W. Sommers	Sergeant Major of the Marine Corps; 1991–1995	Succeeded by Lewis G. Lee
