= John R. Massaro =

8th Sergeant Major of the Marine Corps

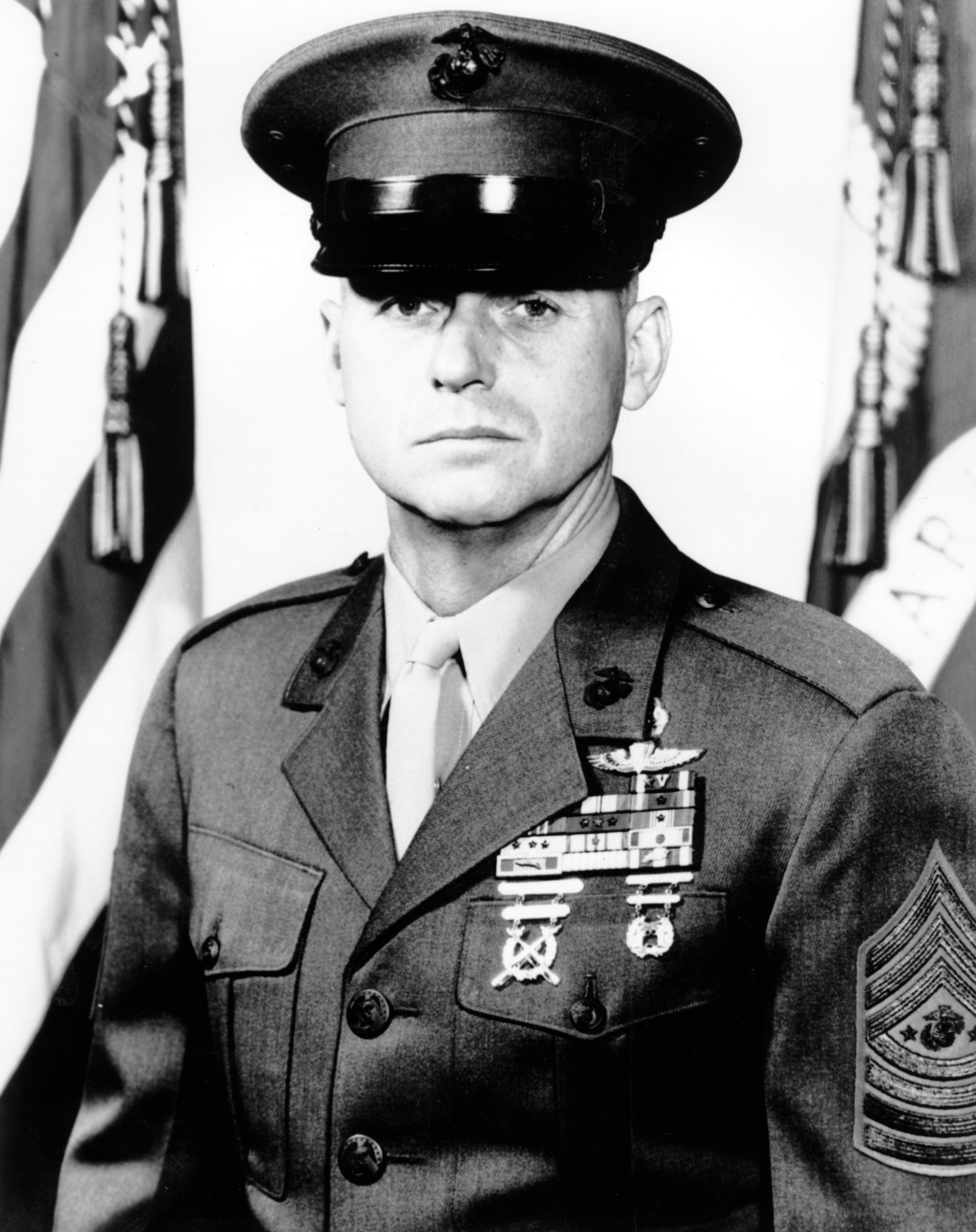
- Sergeant Major John R. Massaro c. 1977
- Born: May 22, 1930 (age 96); Cleveland, Ohio, U.S.
- Military career
- Allegiance: United States
- Branch: United States Marine Corps
- Service years: 1948–1979
- Rank: Sergeant Major
- Commands: Sergeant Major of the Marine Corps
- Conflicts: Korean War; Vietnam War
- Awards: Legion of Merit; Navy and Marine Corps Commendation Medal (2)

John R. Massaro (born May 22, 1930) is a retired United States Marine who served as the 8th Sergeant Major of the Marine Corps from 1977 to 1979.

== Early life ==
Massaro was born in Cleveland, Ohio on May 22, 1930. He graduated from Orrville High School in Orrville, Ohio, in 1948 and enlisted in the United States Marine Corps on August 6, 1948. He underwent recruit training at Marine Corps Recruit Depot Parris Island, South Carolina. He is a member of the Church of Jesus Christ of Latter-day Saints.

== Military career ==
Following recruit training, Massaro was assigned to the 1st Battalion 6th Marines as a rifleman, before transferring to Marine Corps Base Camp Pendleton. He remained there until March 1950. From Camp Pendleton, he was assigned to the Marine Barracks, U.S. Navy Supply Depot, Clearfield, Utah, as a security guard. That was followed by the first of three tours as a drill instructor at Marine Corps Recruit Depot San Diego. He served on the drill field until April 1952, when he rejoined the 1st Marine Division in Korea. He was decorated for actions in combat during that tour.

From Korea, Massaro returned to San Diego for duty as a drill instructor and later as an instructor at the Drill Instructor School. In August 1955, he was a company gunnery sergeant with the 1st Marine Division's Reconnaissance Company and later the 1st Force Reconnaissance Company, remaining there until November 1959. While serving as the company Gunnery Sergeant, he acquired the now famous spirited cry, "Oorah!". He there passed it on to the drill instructor students and they, in turn, passed it on to their recruits.

Massaro was then transferred to Headquarters and Headquarters Squadron, 1st Marine Aircraft Wing at Marine Corps Air Station Iwakuni, Japan. He returned to the 1st Force Reconnaissance Company for duty as company Gunnery Sergeant and later as Company First Sergeant. In June 1963, he returned to San Diego for a third tour as a drill instructor, serving as Chief Drill Instructor.

Massaro then transferred to the Inspector-Instructor Staff of the 4th Force Reconnaissance Company in San Bernardino, California. In 1967, the Sergeant Major joined the 3rd Engineer Battalion in South Vietnam. He was initially assigned as a company First Sergeant and later became the battalion sergeant major.

Massaro next reported to the Marine Corps Recruiting Station in San Francisco, California, and served as Recruiting Station Sergeant Major until August 1972. He then returned overseas and served as group Sergeant Major of Marine Aircraft Group 36 on Okinawa. Following that tour, he reported to Headquarters Marine Corps where he served as Sergeant Major to the Inspector General of the Marine Corps.

In May 1976, Massaro became Sergeant Major of the 1st Marine Division at Camp Pendleton, California, and remained in that billet until his selection as Sergeant Major of the Marine Corps. Sergeant Major John R. Massaro assumed the post of 8th Sergeant Major of the Marine Corps on 1 April 1977.

== Awards and honors ==
Massaro's military decorations include:

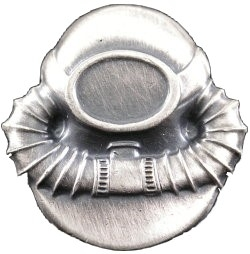

SCUBA Diver Insignia; Navy and Marine Corps Parachutist Insignia
Legion of Merit		Navy and Marine Corps Commendation Medal w/ 1 award star & valor device	
Combat Action Ribbon	Navy Unit Commendation w/ 1 service star	Navy Meritorious Unit Commendation	Marine Corps Good Conduct Medal w/ 7 service stars
National Defense Service Medal w/ 1 service star	Korean Service Medal w/ 3 service stars	Vietnam Service Medal w/ 5 service stars	Korean Presidential Unit Citation
Vietnam Gallantry Cross unit citation	United Nations Korea Medal	Vietnam Campaign Medal	Korean War Service Medal
Rifle Expert Badge		Pistol Expert Badge	

Military offices
Preceded by Henry H. Black	Sergeant Major of the Marine Corps; 1977–1979	Succeeded by Leland D. Crawford
