= Marksmanship badges (United States) =

US military and civilian decoration

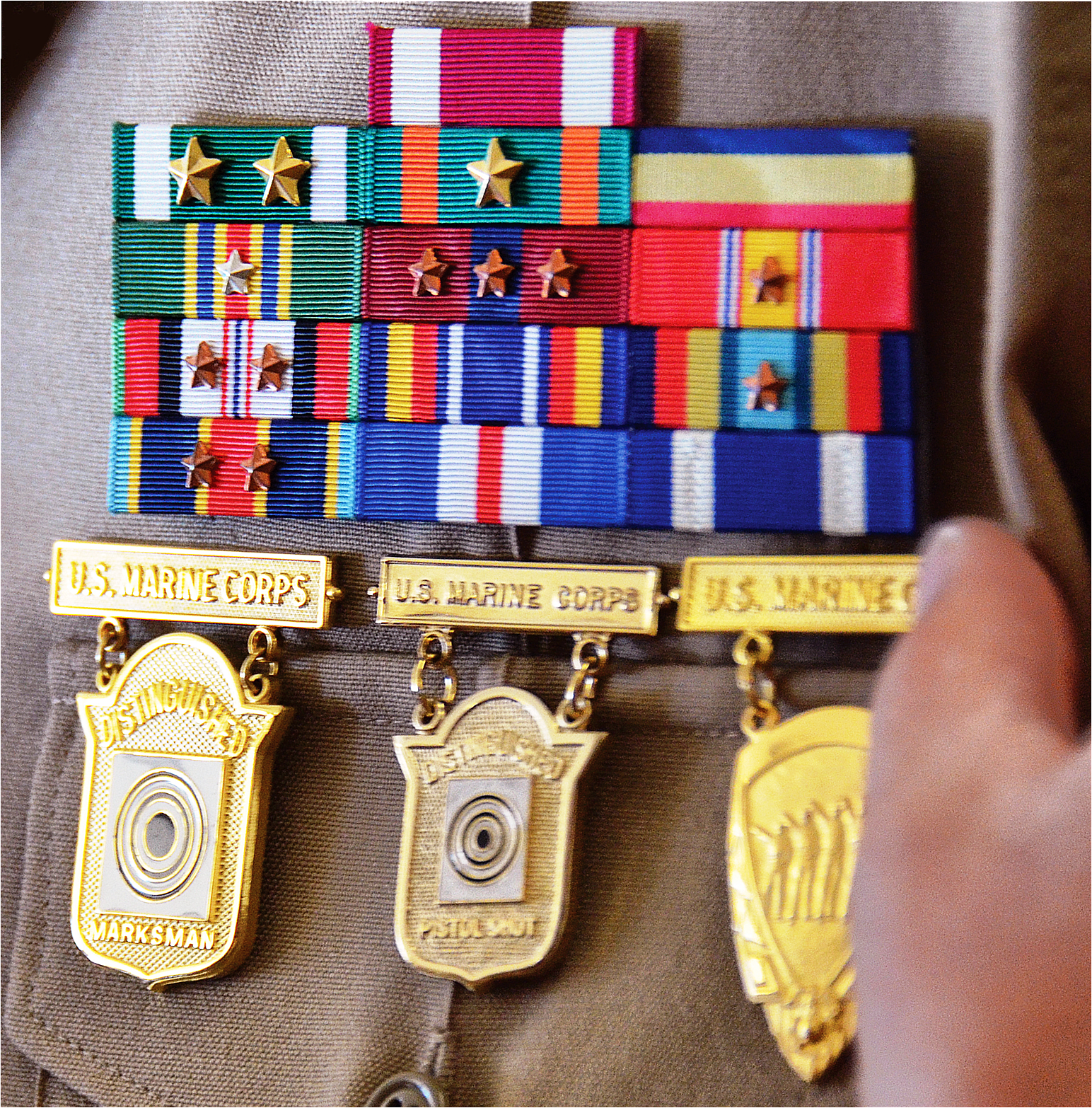
Above are three marksmanship competition badges on a U.S. Marine Corps service uniform; from left–to–right: Distinguished Marksman Badge, Distinguished Pistol Shot Badge, and the Inter-Division Pistol Competition Badge.

In the United States (U.S.), a marksmanship badge is a U.S. military badge or a civilian badge which is awarded to personnel upon successful completion of a weapons qualification course (known as marksmanship qualification badges) or high achievement in an official marksmanship competition (known as marksmanship competition badges). The U.S. Army and the U.S. Marine Corps are the only military services that award marksmanship qualification badges. However, marksmanship medals and/or marksmanship ribbons are awarded by the U.S. Navy, U.S. Coast Guard, and U.S. Air Force for weapons qualifications. For non-military personnel, different U.S. law enforcement organizations and the National Rifle Association (NRA) award marksmanship qualification badges to those involved in law enforcement. Additionally, the Civilian Marksmanship Program (CMP) and the NRA award marksmanship qualification badges to U.S. civilians. Most of these organizations and the U.S. National Guard award marksmanship competition badges to the people they support who succeed in official competitions.

The U.S. Army awards their marksmanship qualification badges for a variety of weapons while the U.S. Marine Corps only awards theirs for the service rifle and service pistol. For civilians, the CMP awards the Army Marksmanship Qualification Badges for rifle, small bore rifle, pistol, and small bore pistol as well as its own air rifle badges. Of those U.S. law enforcement organizations that award marksmanship qualification badges, most award them for their service pistols while others will also award them for rifle and/or shotgun. The NRA awards marksmanship qualification badges for air rifles, rifles, pistols, and shotguns; however the NRA focuses on different rifles and pistols than the CMP. For marksmanship competition badges, the U.S. military award rifle and pistol competition badges; however, the U.S. National Guard also awards marksmanship competition badges for machine gun and sniper rifle. The CMP awards marksmanship competition badges for air rifle, rifle, pistol, and .22 rimfire pistol while the NRA awards them for air rifle, small bore rifle, revolver, and semi-automatic pistol.

The U.S. military and CMP marksmanship qualification badges are awarded in three grades (highest to lowest): expert, sharpshooter, and marksman while their marksmanship competition badges are awarded in three to four grades (highest to lowest): distinguished, silver, and bronze for the U.S. Army, U.S. Coast Guard, and U.S. civilians; distinguished, gold, silver, and bronze for the U.S. Navy and U.S. Marine Corps; and distinguished, silver with wreath, bronze with wreath, and bronze for the U.S. Air Force. The NRA marksmanship qualification badges are awarded in five to six grades (highest to lowest): distinguished expert, expert, sharpshooter, marksman first-class (Winchester/NRA Marksmanship Qualification Program only), marksman, and pro-marksman. U.S. law enforcement marksmanship qualification badges tend to follow NRA guidelines for marksmanship qualification badges or have their own criteria and badge structure. The NRA and the U.S. National Guard marksmanship competition badges are only awarded at one grade with the exception of the NRA's Law Enforcement Distinguished Program, which awards a Law Enforcement Excellence-in-Competition Badge for those officers who earn their first points towards one of the law enforcement distinguished badges.

== Marksmanship qualification badges ==
Starting in the late 19th century, the U.S. Army began awarding marksmanship qualification badges to its soldiers who met specific weapon qualification standards. In the early 20th century, the U.S. Marine Corps and U.S. Navy began awarding marksmanship qualification badges as well. The Marine Corps began by awarding Army Marksmanship Qualification Badges but eventually developed its own badge design, based on the original Army designs from the early 1900s. The Navy developed its own marksmanship qualification badge but retired it after only ten years in lieu of awarding marksmanship ribbons and medals.

For U.S. civilians, the Office of the Director of Civilian Marksmanship—now known as the Corporation for the Promotion of Rifle Practice and Firearm Safety (CPRPFS)—and the NRA began promoting civilian marksmanship in 1903. The CPRPFS's CMP awards Army Marksmanship Qualification Badges to civilians who meet U.S. Army weapon qualification standards as well as its own badges to youth for air rifle marksmanship. The NRA began awarding its own marksmanship qualification badges to civilians in 1918 and today has two primary marksmanship proficiency programs, the Winchester/NRA Marksmanship Qualification Program and the Explorer Service Handgun Qualification Program. Additionally, the NRA supports numerous other firearm proficiency programs throughout the United States, such as those found within various U.S. law enforcement organizations.

=== U.S. Army ===
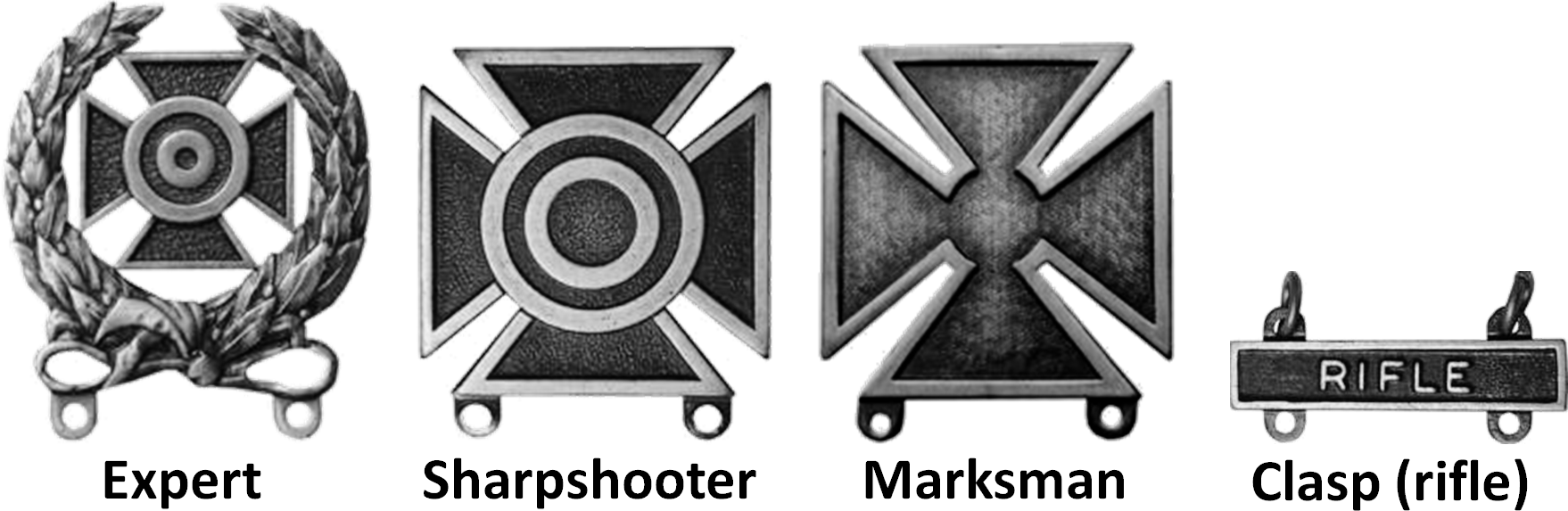
U.S. Army Marksmanship Qualification Badges

The U.S. Army awards Army Marksmanship Qualification Badges to its soldiers, U.S. Army uniformed civilian guards, and foreign military personnel, while the CMP awards these same badges to U.S. civilians who qualify at three different qualification levels (highest to lowest): expert, sharpshooter, and marksman. Suspended from the badge are Army Weapon Qualification Clasps that indicate the type of weapon the individual has qualified to use. The following list of Army Weapon Qualification Clasps are currently authorized under U.S. Army Pamphlet 670-1:

Current Weapon Qualification Clasps (listed with exact inscription)
RIFLE	PISTOL	AA ARTILLERY	AUTO RIFLE
MACHINEGUN	FIELD ARTILLERY	TANK WEAPONS	FLAMETHROWER
SUBMACHINE GUN	ROCKET LAUNCHER	GRENADE	CARBINE
RECOILLESS RIFLE	MORTAR	BAYONET	SMALL BORE RIFLE
SMALL BORE PISTOL	MISSILE	AEROWEAPONS	

The level at which one qualifies is dependent on the weapon, firing range, and the course of fire. For example, to earn an Army Marksmanship Qualification Badge for Pistol at the Combat Pistol Qualification Course, one must have a combined hit count of 26 out of 30 for expert, 21 out of 30 for sharpshooter, and 16 out of 30 for marksman on firing tables one through five. Regardless of the soldier's overall score, everyone must have a minimum hit count of three out of five while wearing a gas mask for the chemical, biological, radiological, and nuclear firing table and two out of four while shooting at night for the night firing table. Each of these firing tables test the shooter on different aspects of combat pistol shooting (shooting from a concealed position, speed loading, shooting on the move, etc.) while engaging human silhouettes at varying distances within an allotted time.

Army Marksmanship Qualification Badges are not permanent awards. When a soldier re-qualifies with their weapon at a different level, the soldier replaces their qualification badge with a new badge that reflects their current level. Only three Army Marksmanship Qualification Badges are authorized for wear on U.S. Army service uniforms and each may have no more than three Army Weapon Qualification Clasps. Although these badges are awarded to both officers and enlisted soldiers alike, as a matter of U.S. Army tradition, only non-commissioned officers and enlisted soldiers are expected to wear these badges on their service uniforms in most units, although policy is set by the commander of each unit.

==== Former Army qualification badges ====
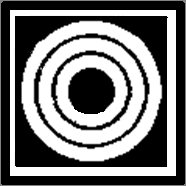
Former U.S. Army Marksman Button

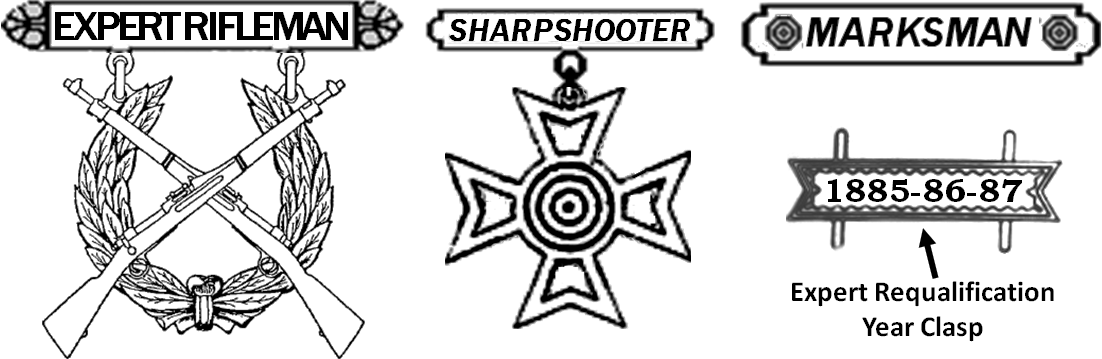
Former U.S. Army and U.S. Marine Corps Rifle Marksmanship Badges

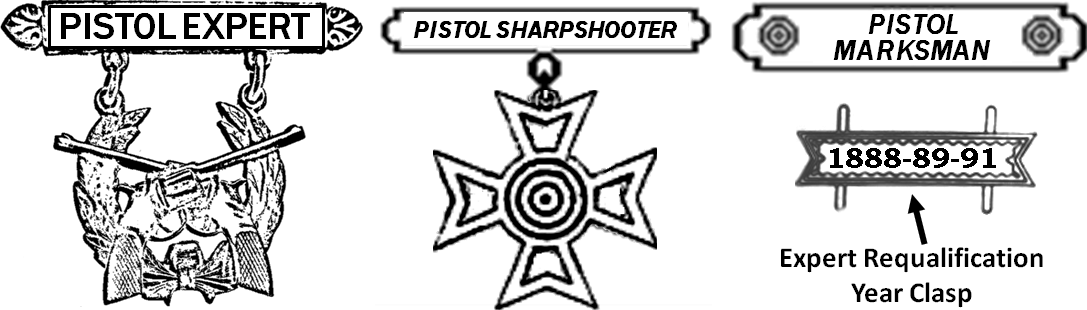
Former U.S. Army Pistol Marksmanship Badges

The Army began using marksmanship qualification badges in 1881 starting with the Marksman Button. That led to a variety of different U.S. Army branch specific marksmanship badges until 1897 when the Rifle Marksmanship Badges were implemented Army wide. The U.S. Army's Pistol Marksmanship Badges were implemented ten years later in 1907. Clasps were added to the Sharpshooter Marksmanship Badge and Expert Marksmanship Badge to indicate the year(s) a soldier requalified as a sharpshooter or expert. Up to three years were denoted on a single clasp. Upon earning the badge a fourth time, another clasp was added and that new clasp was used to denote up to three additional years of requalification; there was no limit to the number of clasps that could be hung from these badges. In 1915, the U.S. Army changed the design of the Expert Pistol Qualification Badge's pendant by replacing the revolvers with M1911s; this pendant lives on in today's Marine Corps Expert Pistol Qualification Badge. Additionally, the U.S. Army had a short-lived series of Artillery Qualification Badges from 1891 through 1913. In 1921, the pistol and artillery badges were combined into today's Army Marksmanship Qualification Badges through the addition of the Pistol Clasp and Field Artillery Clasp. Prior to 1951, the names of the qualification levels for the current Army Marksmanship Qualification Badges were known as (highest to lowest) expert, sharpshooter or first-class gunner, and marksman or second-class gunner. Also, prior to 1972, the Army Marksmanship Qualification Badges had many different types of weapon qualification clasps. According to The Institute of Heraldry, the following is a list of previously awarded Army Weapon Qualification Clasps:

Former Weapon Qualification Clasps (listed with exact inscription)
1921
RIFLE-A, RIFLE-B, RIFLE-C, RIFLE-D, AUTOMATIC RIFLE, PISTOL, MACHINE GUN, MINE GUNNER, C.A. GUNNER, INF HOWITZER, and F.A. GUNNER
1922
Added: SWORD, PISTOL-M, PISTOL-D, and MACHINE RIFLE
1924
Added: MACHINE RIFLE, TANK WEAPONS, C.W.S. WEAPONS, and BAYONET
Consolidated: all rifles to RIFLE
1926
Added: AERIAL GUNNER and AERIAL BOMBER
1928
Added: GRENADE
1941
Added: SMALL BORE RIFLE, SMALL BORE PISTOL, SMALL BORE MG, and SUBMACHINE GUN
Removed: SWORD
1944
Added: CARBINE, ANTITANK, 60 MM MORTAR, 81 MM MORTAR, TD 57 MM, TD 75 MM, and TD 3 INCH
1948
Added: RECOILLESS RIFLE and MORTAR
Removed: PISTOL-D, PISTOL-M, MINES, C.W.S. WEAPONS, AERIAL GUNNER, AERIAL BOMBER, SMALL BORE MG, ANTITANK, 60 MM MORTAR, 81 MM MORTAR, and TD (all types)
1951
Added: SUBMARINE MINES
1972
Added: AEROWEAPONS

=== U.S. Marine Corps ===
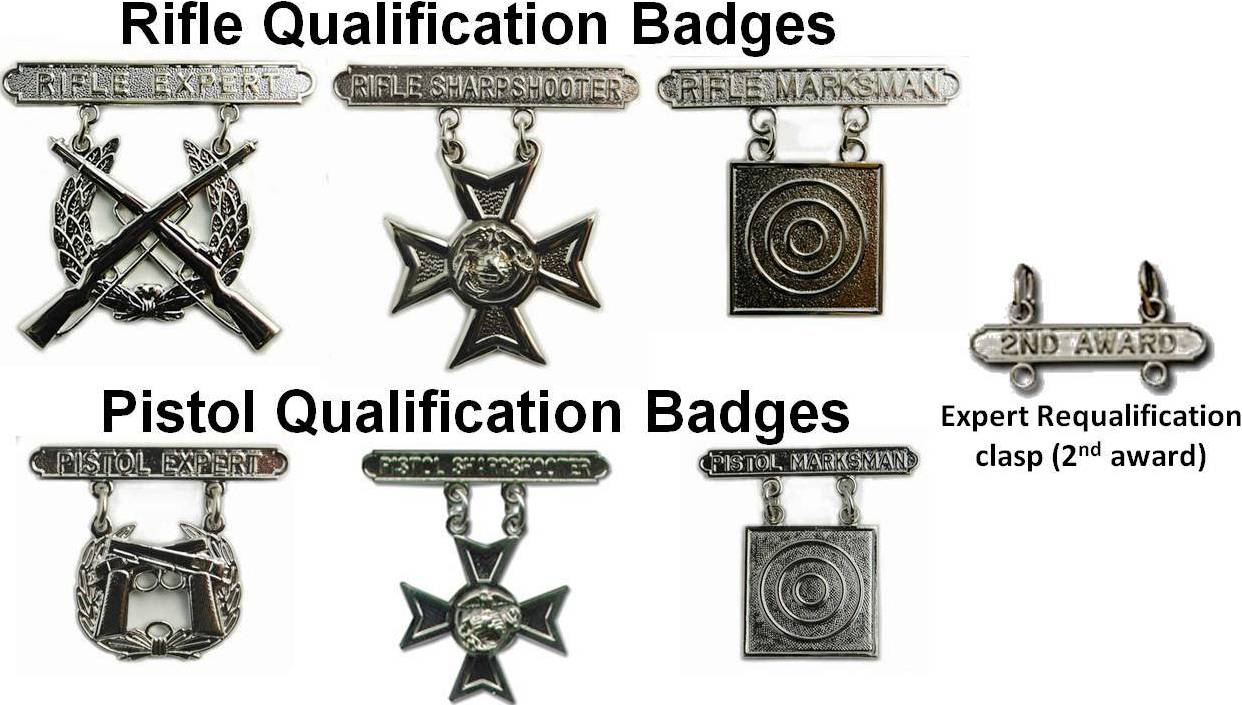
U.S. Marine Corps Marksmanship Qualification Badges

The U.S. Marine Corps award two types of Marine Corps Marksmanship Qualification Badges, one for the service rifle and one for the service pistol, to all Marines who qualify at one of three different qualification levels (highest to lowest): expert, sharpshooter, and marksman. These qualification badges are suspended beneath a brooch which bears the name of the type of weapon (rifle or pistol) and the qualification level earned. Some of these badges are different in appearance, depending on the type of weapon and qualification level.

Video of a U.S. Marine Corps pistol qualification course exam (4:34)

For a Marine to earn a marksmanship qualification badge, they must obtain a passing score at an annual weapons qualification event. To earn a Marine Corps Rifle Qualification Badge, a Marine must successfully complete multiple tables of fire (organized, sequential training modules used to teach, practice, and evaluate marksmanship skills from basic to advanced levels) to include the Fundamental Rifle Marksmanship Table, the Basic Combat Rifle Marksmanship Table, the Intermediate Combat Rifle Marksmanship Table, and the Advanced Combat Rifle Marksmanship Table. These tables require a Marine to engage human silhouettes at varying distances, positions, and scenarios within an allotted time. To earn a Marine Corps Pistol Qualification Badge, a Marine must successfully complete four phases of fire which include weapons handling, operator maintenance, stationary target engagement, and scenario based target engagements. Similar to the rifle tables, the pistol phases require a Marine to engage human silhouettes at varying distances and scenarios within an allotted time. After qualifying, a Marine will receive a marksmanship badge commensurate with the score they obtained. For annual qualification with the service rifle, scores range from 305 to 350 for expert, 280–304 for sharpshooter, and 250–279 for marksman. For annual qualification with the service pistol, the scores range from 364 to 400 for expert, 324–363 for sharpshooter, and 264–323 for marksman.

U.S. Marine Corps Marksmanship Qualification Badges may be worn on U.S. Marine Corps dress and service uniforms for the remainder of a Marine's military career, or until a different level of qualification (higher or lower) is achieved. Typically, all Marines qualify with the rifle on an annual basis. The most recent qualification score determines the badge that is worn. If a Marine achieves the qualification of expert multiple times, a clasp is hung between the brooch and the pendant of the appropriate badge denoting the number of subsequent awards.

==== Former Marine Corps qualification badges ====
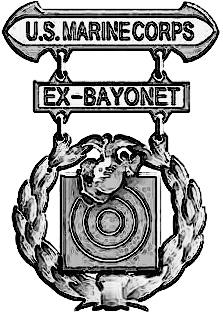
Former U.S. Marine Corps Basic Badge w/ Expert Bayonet Clasp

According to the Marine Corps History Division, the Marine Corps used to award three different styles/types of marksmanship qualification badges. Starting in 1912, the Marine Corps began awarding the Army Rifle Marksmanship Badges to Marines who qualified with the service rifle. As with the U.S. Army, the Marine Corps awarded these rifle badges at three qualification levels (highest to lowest): expert, sharpshooter, and marksman. Just like the U.S. Army, year clasps were added to the Expert Rifle Marksmanship Badge and Sharpshooter Rifle Marksmanship Badge to indicate the year(s) a Marine requalified at that level. The former Army Expert Rifle Marksmanship Badge is almost identical to the current version of the Marine Corps Expert Rifle Qualification Badge, but uses crossed M1903 Springfield Rifles vs. M1 Garands with slings. In 1924, the Marine Corps replaced these badges with the Army Marksmanship Qualification Badges, which are still in use by the U.S. Army. However, the Marine Corps decided to bring back the older Army Rifle Marksmanship Badges in 1937. That same year, the Marine Corps introduced the Marine Corps Basic Badge for marksmanship qualifications with other weapon systems. Clasps were hung from the Marine Corps Basic Badge's brooch indicating the type of weapon and level of qualification. The clasps indicated the degree of proficiency by using the letters "SS" for sharpshooter or "EX" for expert, followed by the name of the weapon. The exception to this rule was a U.S. Marine Corps Reserve clasps for the .30 Caliber Rifle Course D ("RIFLE-D") which included "MM" for marksman. Much like the Army Weapon Qualification Clasps, the clasps of the Marine Corps Basic Badge fluctuated with additions and deletions in 1949 and again in 1954. The following clasps were authorized for wear on the Marine Corps Basic Badge under the 1937 Marine Corps Uniform Regulation:

Former Basic Badge Clasps (listed with exact inscription)
Expert Clasps	Sharpshooter Clasps	Marksman Clasp
EX-RIFLE-D	SS-RIFLE-D	MM-RIFLE-D
EX-SMALL BORE	SS-SMALL BORE	
EX-PISTOL	SS-PISTOL	
EX-AUTO-RIFLE	SS-AUTO RIFLE	
EX-MACH. GUN	SS-MACH. GUN	
EX-HOWITZER	SS-HOWITZER	
EX-T.S.M.G.	SS-T.S.M.G.	
EX-BAYONET

The Army Rifle Marksmanship Badges were replaced by the current Marine Corps Rifle Marksmanship Qualification Badges in 1958. That same year, the U.S. Marine Corps adopted the U.S. Army's 1915 design of the Army Expert Pistol Qualification Badge and created its own Marine Corps Pistol Qualification Badges, which is still in use today. The Marine Corps Basic Badge remained in use until 1968 when it was declared obsolete.

=== U.S. Navy (historical) ===
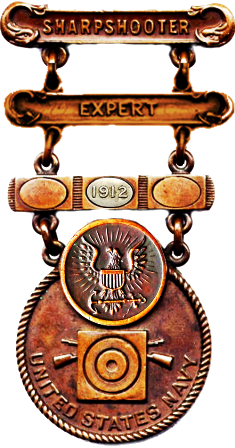
Former U.S. Navy Sharpshooter's Badge with Expert Clasp and Qualification Year Clasp with one Year Disk (1912)

For a decade, from 1910 to 1920, the U.S. Navy awarded a marksmanship badge, called the Navy Sharpshooter's Badge, to sailors who qualified with the service rifle and/or service pistol. Today, sailors are awarded marksmanship ribbons and medals to denote service weapon qualification.

The Navy Sharpshooter's Badge was awarded at two qualification levels, expert (highest qualification level) and sharpshooter. Despite this, the 1913 Uniform Regulations for the U.S. Navy stated that the Navy Sharpshooter's Badge outranked all other marksmanship badges on the U.S. Navy uniform, including marksmanship competition badges.

The Navy Sharpshooter's Badge was made of antique bronze with a rectangular brooch that had the word "SHARPSHOOTER" embossed in its center with circling serpent bookends. Below the brooch hung two types of clasps, an Expert Qualification Clasp and a Qualification Year Clasp. From those clasps hung the badge's pendant. The Expert Qualification Clasp is identical in design to the brooch but with the word(s) "EXPERT," for the service rifle, or "EXPERT PISTOL SHOT," for the service pistol. Each time a shooter requalified as expert, another Expert Qualification Clasp was hung from the badge. If no Expert Qualification Clasp was suspended from the badge, then the shooter qualified as a sharpshooter with the service rifle and/or service pistol. The Qualification Year Clasp is different in design from the brooch which incorporated three ovals along its length for the placement of Year Disks. The Year Disk was made of silver and embossed with the year the shooter qualified/requalified. On the fourth requalification year, another Qualification Year Clasp was hung from the badge with a fourth Year Disk embossed with the year of requalification. There was no limit to the number of clasps that could be hung from the badge. Hanging from the clasp(s) was the badge's pendant, which was the design basis for today's U.S. Navy marksmanship medals. The only difference between the pendant of the Navy Sharpshooter's Badge and the Navy Expert Rifleman Medal or Expert Pistol Shot Medal is the metal color (from antique bronze to gold), the deletion of the crossed rifles from behind a replica of a rifle target, and the addition of the words "EXPERT RIFLEMAN" or "EXPERT PISTOL SHOT" embossed above the rifle target.

Starting in 1920, U.S. Navy marksmanship ribbons replaced the Navy Sharpshooter's Badge. There are two types of U.S. Navy marksmanship ribbons, one for the service rifle ( ) and one for the service pistol ( ). Each can be embellished with a marksmanship device to denote the shooter's qualification level. A silver "E" Device ( ) is awarded to those who qualify as an expert (the highest qualification level) while a bronze "S" Device ( ) is awarded to those who qualify as a sharpshooter (second highest qualification). If no marksmanship device is displayed, the shooter qualified as a marksman (lowest qualification level). For an unknown period of time, a bronze "E" Device was awarded to those who initially qualified as expert; after three consecutive expert qualifications, the device turned to silver with a permanent award status. Starting in 1969, the Expert Rifleman Medal and Expert Pistol Shot Medal were introduced and are awarded to sailors who qualify as expert along with the appropriate U.S. Navy marksmanship ribbon with silver "E" Device. Sailors who qualify on a small arms qualification course with another military service may wear the appropriate Navy ribbon or medal corresponding to that service qualification.

=== Junior Reserve Officers' Training Corps ===
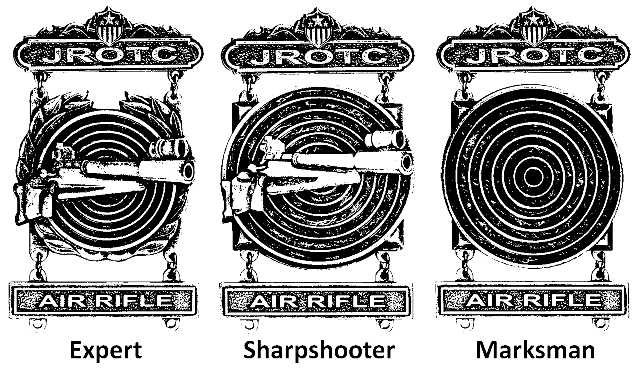
Junior Reserve Officers' Training Corps Rifle Qualification Badges

The Junior Reserve Officers' Training Corps (JROTC) and the CMP have established a JROTC Rifle Marksmanship Training and Award Program to increase a cadet's knowledge and skill in handling rifles safely and proficiently. JROTC cadets who participate in rifle marksmanship training are eligible to earn a JROTC Rifle Qualification Badge, representative of one of three qualification levels (in ascending order): Marksman, Sharpshooter, and Expert. These badges signify that the cadets who wear them, have demonstrated the knowledge and skill necessary to handle rifles safely, and to achieve their required scores in the relevant qualification firing tests.

The CMP have set standards that apply to the conduct of weapon qualification events. All qualification events must be done with sporter-class air rifles, such as the Daisy M853/9753/953 pneumatic rifles or Daisy M887/888 CO_{2} rifles, that were awarded through the military supply system. Qualification tests must be conducted at a distance of ten meters (33 feet). Qualification tests may be done on either the basic marksmanship course (BMC) targets or AR-1 competition targets. During qualification tests, a sling, glove, and kneeling roll may be used. To receive a qualification badge, cadets must attain the following scores that is supervised or observed by a qualified instructor:

- Expert: 220-300 (AR-1 Target), 290-300 (BMC Target)
  - 10 shots standing, 10 shots prone, and 10 shots kneeling
- Sharpshooter: 130-200 (AR-1 Target), 188-200 (BMC Target)
  - 10 shots standing, 10 shots prone
- Marksman: 110-129 (AR-1 Target), 175-187 (BMC Target)
  - 10 shots standing, 10 shots prone

JROTC cadets are authorized to wear the JROTC Air Rifle Marksmanship Qualification Badge, as well as other CMP or NRA awarded badges, on their service uniforms. Cadets may earn more than one badge, but may only wear the highest-ranking badge earned for a given weapon.

=== U.S. law enforcement ===
Each U.S. law enforcement organization, such as the Los Angeles Police Department (LAPD), New York City Police Department (NYPD), have established various law enforcement marksmanship qualification badges for their officers to highlight their proficiency with their service firearms and encourage their peers to strive for excellence with their sidearm.

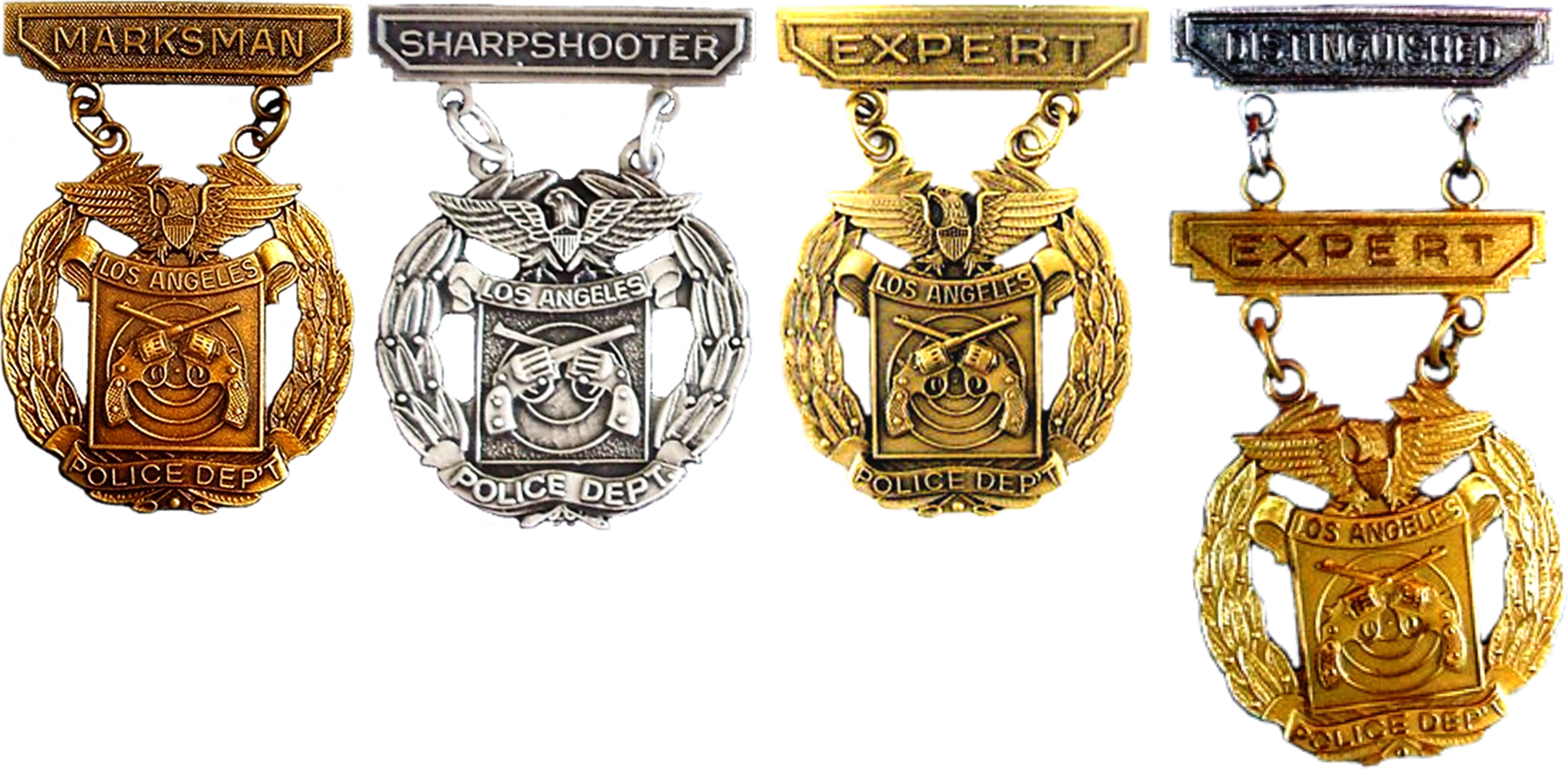
LAPD marksmanship badges; from left–to–right: lowest to highest qualification

Some organizations, such as the LAPD, follow the NRA's marksmanship guidelines and award unique LAPD Marksmanship Badges to their officers at four distinct levels: (from lowest to highest) Marksman, Sharpshooter, Expert, and Distinguished Expert. To earn the LAPD Marksman Marksmanship Badge, an officer must score 300–339 out of 400 points at the voluntary bonus qualification shoot. For the LAPD Sharpshooter Marksmanship Badge, an officer must score 340–379 and 380–400 for the LAPD Expert Marksmanship Badge. To earn the LAPD Distinguished Expert Marksmanship Badge, an officer must score 2,310 out of 2,400 points in a consecutive six‑month period.

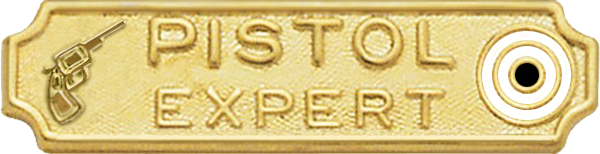
NYPD Firearms Proficiency Pistol Expert Bar

Other organizations, such as the NYPD, award only two marksmanship badges, known as the NYPD Firearms Proficiency Bars, to their officers who certify or recertify as either a (lowest to highest) Pistol Shot or Pistol Expert with their service weapon.

NRA Explorer Service Handgun Qualification Bars

The NRA's Explorer Service Handgun Qualification Program is designed exclusively for the Law Enforcement Exploring program and is used as a development tool to help potential law enforcement officers (called Explorers) establish safe shooting habits and increase their shooting proficiency with a handgun. Performance is measured against established par scores and any Explorer who meets or exceeds those scores can be awarded the appropriate badge by the law enforcement post to which the Explorer belongs. These Explorer Service Handgun Qualification Bars are awarded in five levels (lowest to highest): pro-marksman, marksman, sharpshooter, expert, and distinguished expert.

Prior to participating in NRA's Explorer Service Handgun Qualification Program, Explorer's are required to complete an eight-hour firearm safety course. Only a law enforcement service handgun, authorized by the sponsoring law enforcement agency, is to be used against standard NRA B-8 targets. The courses of fire are conducted from either a benchrest or standing position, from ranges of 5 to 25 yards, with 20 to 30 shots, and has 2 or 3 phases of fire (slow fire, timed fire, and rapid fire). A course of fire must be completed in the same session and must be witnessed by the range supervisor or the officer-in-charge of the law enforcement explorer post in order to qualify. The following courses of fire must be achieved to be awarded the corresponding Explorer Service Handgun Qualification Badge:

- Pro-Marksman: From a benchrest, achieve a 50% hit count in slow fire against five and seven yard targets
- Marksman: From a standing position, achieve a 60% hit count in slow fire and 50% hit count in timed fire against a seven-yard target
- Sharpshooter: From a standing position, achieve a 75% hit count in slow fire, 65% hit count in timed fire, and 50% hit count in rapid fire against a 15-yard target
- Expert: From a standing position, achieve an 85% hit count in slow fire, 75% hit count in timed fire, and 65% hit count in rapid fire against a 20-yard target
- Distinguished Expert: Aggregate course of fire shot five times with a score of 201/300 or better in each aggregate.

These Explorer Service Handgun Qualification Badges are authorized for wear on the Law Enforcement Explorer uniform.

=== U.S. civilians ===
Examples of the NRA's Winchester/NRA Marksmanship Qualification Badges with shotgun and pistol clasps on the NRA Distinguished Expert Badge.

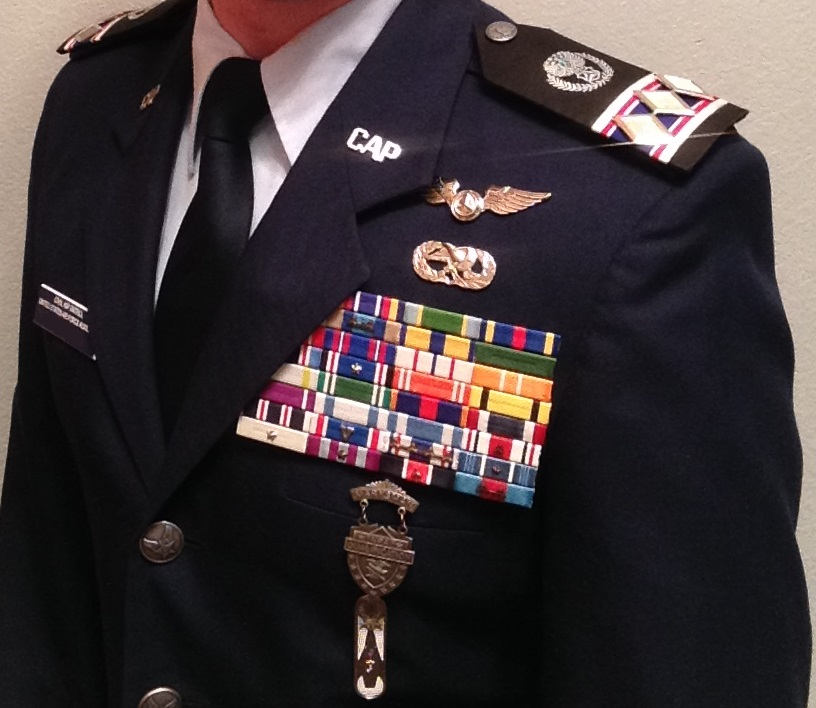
A Civil Air Patrol (CAP) cadet wears his NRA Marksman Badge on his CAP dress uniform

Although the CMP awards Army Marksmanship Qualification Badges to qualified U.S. civilians, there are different organizations throughout the U.S. that have established marksmanship programs and awards to encourage marksmanship amongst their members. The NRA is one organization that has national level programs that are recognized and used by various U.S. entities. One such program is the Winchester/NRA Marksmanship Qualification Program which is designed to encourage firearms safety and develop civilian marksmanship through the awarding of Winchester/NRA Marksmanship Qualification Badges. The program is also designed to help marksmanship instructors and coaches train their shooters through a published set of guidelines that apply to both juniors and adults. Despite its similarities, the NRA's marksmanship program does not compete with the CMP. The NRA awards marksmanship qualification badges for air rifle, light rifle, rifle, high-power rifle, air pistol, pistol, and shotgun. Performance is measured against established par scores and any shooters who meet or exceed those scores are entitled to a corresponding marksmanship qualification badge. The courses of fire in the qualification program are designed to take shooters from beginning skill levels (pro-marksman and marksman) through intermediate levels (marksman first-class, sharpshooter, and expert) up to a nationally recognized skill level (distinguished expert). Qualification tests can be conducted anywhere and is based on the honor system. However, to earn the NRA Distinguished Expert Badge, an NRA Certified Instructor or Coach must witness and officially record the course of fire. Those who participate in formal competition can use the tournament results bulletin as validation for the NRA Distinguished Expert Badge. Each skill level requires that a shooter achieve a score more than once to earn a specific marksmanship qualification badge. However, they do not have to be fired consecutively or in the same session.

When the shooter reaches marksman first-class, a rectangular clasp embossed with the words "FIRST CLASS" is added to the NRA Marksman Badge, suspended between the brooch and the pendant. When the shooter reaches sharpshooter, the shooter will begin to earn gold rectangular clasps that represent different courses of fire that are suspended between the brooch and the pendant of the NRA Sharpshooter Badge. Between one and nine small black vertical rectangles are etched onto the gold clasps representing a specific course of fire successfully completed by the shooter. Likewise, the NRA Distinguished Expert Badge uses gold rectangular weapon clasps which are suspended in the same manner as the marksman first-class and sharpshooter clasps to identify the type of firearm for which the badge has been earned. Each firearm clasp is black with raised gold trim; in the center of the clasps are raised gold capital letters spelling rifle, shotgun, or pistol. If the shooter has earned the NRA Distinguished Expert Badge for more than one type of firearm, multiple clasps denoting each firearm are suspended between the badge's brooch and its pendant.

==== History of the Winchester/NRA badges ====
The Winchester/NRA Marksmanship Qualification Program was established in 1926 when the Winchester Junior Rifle Corps and the NRA Junior Marksmanship Program were combined. American youth remained the target audience focusing on firearm safety and marksmanship. The newly combined program used the original Winchester Junior Rifle Corps qualification levels until 2002 when the NRA added the marksman first-class qualification, increasing the number of qualification levels to six. In the early 21st century, the pendant of the original NRA marksmanship qualification badges changed from a circular wreathed pendant to a unique shield design with the words "Junior Division" removed from the pendant; the same was done with the original design of the NRA Distinguished Expert Badge but both the brooch and pendant were completely redesigned. These changes likely occurred when the NRA revamped the Winchester/NRA Marksmanship Qualification Program to be more inclusive; the program now includes 11 different courses of fire for both youths and adults.

== Marksmanship competition badges ==
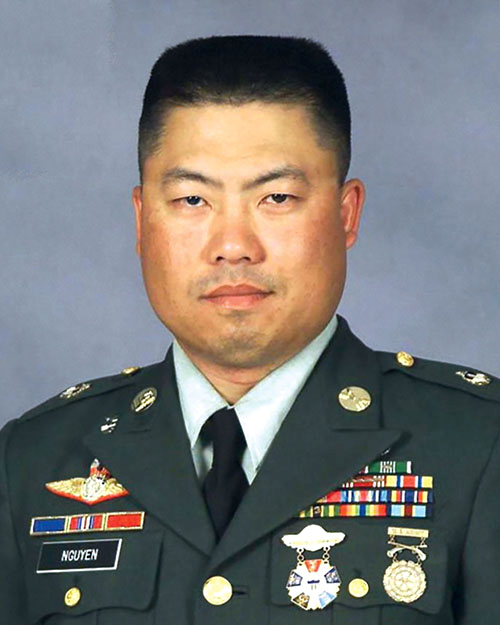
SFC Tung M. Nguyen wearing his Army Interservice Competition Badge (gold) (left) and Army EIC Pistol Shot Badge (bronze) (right) on the U.S. Army Service Uniform

The 1996 U.S. federal law established the CPRPFS with the authority to promote practice and safety in the use of firearms through the conduct of competitions and the awarding of prizes, trophies, badges, and other insignia to high performing competitors, which it carries out through the CMP. This authorization carries with it the responsibility to administer the CPRPFS's distinguished marksmanship programs. The CMP maintains records of points earned by shooters and presents appropriate prizes to those who earn them while the U.S. armed forces award service specific competition marksmanship badges to serviceman based on the CMP's records for points earned.

The CMP has a point system that competitors use to work their way towards "distinguished status." Starting in 2015, the CMP began awarding achievement pins based on the score one earns at a given match. For example, to earn a bronze, silver, or gold CMP .22 Rimfire Pistol Achievement Pin, one must achieve a score of 235–249, 250–264, or 265+ respectively in the authorized excellence category of competition. Also in 2015, the CMP established minimum cut scores that must be achieved for a given weapon in the authorized excellence category of competition before one can earn credit points (also referred to as "leg points") towards a distinguished marksmanship badge. Once the minimum cut score has been achieved or exceeded (260-300 for .22 rimfire pistol, 250-300 for service pistol, and 455-500 for service rifle), the shooter becomes eligible to earn leg points. The number of leg points that can be earned are based on the number of competitors, one's score, one's ranking, and you must fall within the top 10% of all match shooters regardless of your minimum cut score. Typically, the highest one-sixth of the top 10% earn ten leg points, the next highest two-sixths earn eight, and the remaining three-sixths earn six. Depending on the awarding organization, competitors must earn between one and six leg points to be awarded their first excellence-in-competition (EIC) badge. Everyone must earn at least 30 leg points to reach "distinguished status" and be awarded one of the distinguished marksmanship badges. Leg points accumulate throughout a competitor's lifetime until "distinguished status" is attained. Thus, leg points earned as a member of the U.S. armed forces will transfer toward "distinguished status" as a civilian, and vice versa.

Similarly, the NRA has like programs which use similar ranking systems as the CPRPFS's distinguished marksmanship programs where a shooter must work their way up to "distinguished status" by demonstrating repeated excellence in marksmanship. The NRA's distinguished marksmanship programs focus on areas not covered by the CPRPF. However, the NRA's newest program, the NRA Distinguished Air Gun Program, is in competition with the CPRPFS's Junior Distinguished Program as they both focus on air gun proficiency among American youth.

In addition to the CMP's leg point driven system of marksmanship awards, the U.S. military and certain states award marksmanship tabs, brassards, and badges for high placement in official marksmanship competitions, such as the President's Pistol and Rifle Matches, the National Guard Small Arms Championships, the Army Interservice Competition Badges, the U.S. Marine Corps's trophy matches, and some state marksmanship competitions, just to name a few.

=== Distinguished marksmanship programs ===
==== EIC badges ====
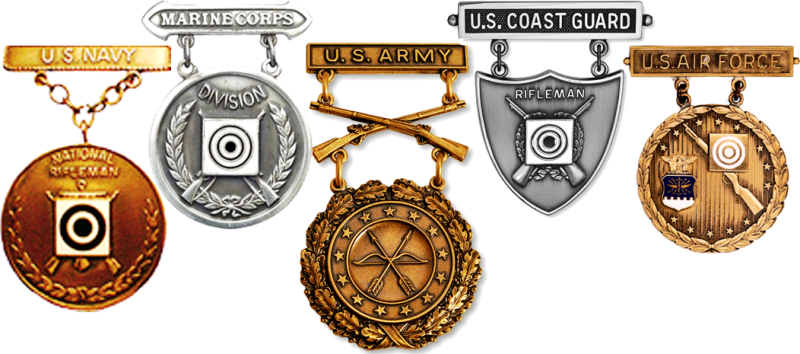
Examples of U.S. armed force's EIC Badges for the service rifle

The U.S. armed forces award EIC badges to their members based on the CMP's records of leg points earned at a rifle and/or pistol match and in accordance with that member's service regulation(s). For example, the U.S. Navy and U.S. Marine Corps awards their Bronze EIC Badges when a sailor/Marine earns six leg points when competing in an authorized excellence category of competition, their Silver EIC Badges when eight leg points have been earned, and their Gold EIC Badges when ten leg points are earned. The U.S. Army and U.S. Coast Guard award their Bronze EIC Badges when a soldier/Coast Guardsman earns their first leg points when competing in an authorized excellence category of competition. However, the Army Silver EIC Badges and Coast Guard Silver EIC Badges are awarded differently; the U.S. Army will award their Silver EIC Badges when 20 leg points have been earned and the U.S. Coast Guard will award their Silver EIC Badges when a Coast Guardsman has earned their second set of leg points regardless of the number of points earned. The U.S. Air Force awards Bronze EIC Badges (without wreath) to airman who rank in the top 10% of competitors at a U.S. Air Force-approved competition; these competitions do not have to be CMP sanctioned. The Air Force Bronze EIC Badges with Wreath are awarded when six leg points have been earned in an authorized excellence category of competition and their Silver EIC Badges with Wreath when 20 leg points have been earned.

Within the armed forces, there are three levels of EIC competition, installation or unit level competitions (level 1), region or command level competitions (level 2), and service, interservice, or national competitions (level 3). All five of the military services have uniquely designed EIC badges that are awarded to their members. EIC badges awarded at these different levels of competition are the same with a few exceptions. For EIC badges awarded at national competitions, the U.S. Navy and U.S. Coast Guard emboss the word "NATIONAL" at the top or bottom of their EIC badges respectively to distinguish them from other U.S. Navy and U.S. Coast Guard EIC badges. Also, the U.S. Navy and U.S. Marine Corps award slightly modified EIC badges at U.S. Navy Fleet or U.S. Marine Corps Division level (level 1) EIC matches. For example, U.S. Navy emboss the word "FLEET" at the top of their U.S. Navy EIC badges while the eagle, globe, and anchor on the Marine Corps EIC badges are replaced with the word "DIVISION" to distinguish these EIC badges from those earned and higher level competitions.

NRA's Law Enforcement EIC Badge

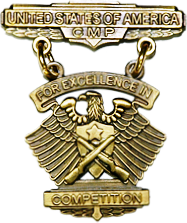
CMP's Civilian EIC Rifle Badge (bronze)

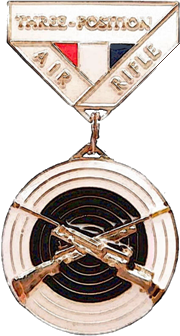
CMP's Junior EIC Air Rifle Badge (silver)

Just like the U.S. armed forces, the NRA has an EIC badge which is awarded to law enforcement officers that have earned their first leg point(s) toward NRA's "distinguished status" with the revolver or semi-automatic pistol. Law enforcement officers can only earn these leg points during NRA police pistol combat tournaments or during the NRA National Police Shooting Championship. Since the NRA Law Enforcement EIC Badge is awarded at only one level (silver), letters are presented to competitors indicating the total number of leg points they have earned as they work towards "distinguished status."

The CMP's civilian EIC badges are awarded to adult civilian competitors who achieve sufficient points in a CMP authorized excellence category of rifle and/or pistol competition. The CMP's bronze EIC badges are awarded with six leg points have been earned and the CMP's silver EIC badges are awarded when 20 leg points have been achieved. The CPRPFS's Junior Air Rifle Program leg point system is identical to its rifle and pistol program; however the CMP will award their bronze Junior EIC Air Rifle Badge when junior competitors earn three leg points when competing in an authorized excellence category of competition and their silver Junior EIC Air Rifle Badge when 15 leg points have been earned.

The following is a list of current EIC badges that are awarded by the CMP and the U.S. armed forces to their members; these EIC badges are listed in order of precedence by organization:

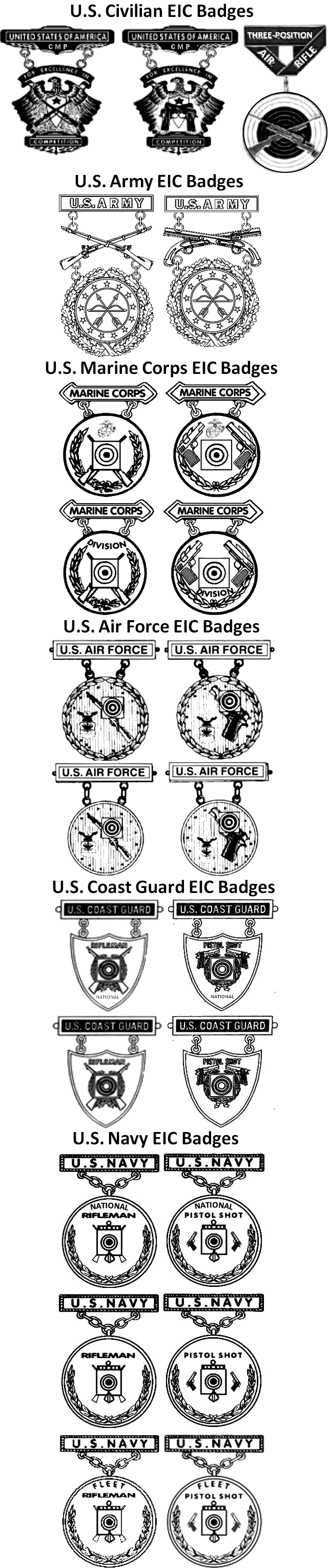

- Civilian EIC Badges
  - Civilian EIC Rifle Badge (silver)
  - Civilian EIC Pistol Badge (silver)
  - Civilian EIC Rifle Badge (bronze)
  - Civilian EIC Pistol Badge (bronze)
  - Junior EIC Air Rifle Badge (silver)
  - Junior EIC Air Rifle Badge (bronze)
- U.S. Army EIC Badges
  - Army EIC Rifle Badge (silver)
  - Army EIC Pistol Shot Badge (silver)
  - Army EIC Rifle Badge (bronze)
  - Army EIC Pistol Shot Badge (bronze)
- U.S. Marine Corps EIC Badges
  - National/Interservice/Marine Corps Rifle Competition Badge (gold)
  - National/Interservice/Marine Corps Pistol Competition Badge (gold)
  - National/Interservice/Marine Corps Rifle Competition Badge (silver)
  - National/Interservice/Marine Corps Pistol Competition Badge (silver)
  - National/Interservice/Marine Corps Rifle Competition Badge (bronze)
  - National/Interservice/Marine Corps Pistol Competition Badge (bronze)
  - Division Rifle Competition Badge (gold)
  - Division Pistol Competition Badge (gold)
  - Division Rifle Competition Badge (silver)
  - Division Pistol Competition Badge (silver)
  - Division Rifle Competition Badge (bronze)
  - Division Pistol Competition Badge (bronze)
- U.S. Air Force EIC Badges
  - Air Force Silver EIC Rifle Badge with Wreath
  - Air Force Silver EIC Pistol Badge with Wreath
  - Air Force Bronze EIC Rifle Badge with Wreath
  - Air Force Bronze EIC Pistol Badge with Wreath
  - Air Force Bronze EIC Rifle Badge
  - Air Force Bronze EIC Pistol Badge
- U.S. Coast Guard EIC Badges
  - National Rifleman EIC Badge (silver)
  - National Pistol Shot EIC Badge (silver)
  - National Rifleman EIC Badge (bronze)
  - National Pistol Shot EIC Badge (bronze)
  - Coast Guard Rifleman EIC Badge (silver)
  - Coast Guard Pistol Shot EIC Badge (silver)
  - Coast Guard Rifleman EIC Badge (bronze)
  - Coast Guard Pistol Shot EIC Badge (bronze)
- U.S. Navy EIC Badges
  - National EIC Rifle Badge (gold)
  - National EIC Pistol Badge (gold)
  - Interservice/Navy EIC Rifle Badge (gold)
  - Interservice/Navy EIC Pistol Badge (gold)
  - Fleet EIC Rifle Badge (gold)
  - Fleet EIC Pistol Badge (gold)
  - National EIC Rifle Badge (silver)
  - National EIC Pistol Badge (silver)
  - 'Interservice/Navy EIC Rifle Badge (silver)
  - Interservice/Navy EIC Pistol Badge (silver)
  - Fleet EIC Rifle Badge (silver)
  - Fleet EIC Pistol Badge (silver)
  - National EIC Rifle Badge (bronze)
  - National EIC Pistol Badge (bronze)
  - Interservice/Navy EIC Rifle Badge (bronze)
  - Interservice/Navy EIC Pistol Badge (bronze)
  - Fleet EIC Rifle Badge (bronze)
  - Fleet EIC Pistol Badge (bronze)

These badges are onetime decorations and the military EIC badges may be worn on U.S. armed forces' service uniforms for the remainder of an individual's career. These badges may be worn simultaneously with the U.S. Army's and U.S. Marine Corps's Marksmanship qualification badges, and other authorized marksmanship competition badges, on service uniforms not to exceed a total of three badges. The U.S. Navy and U.S. Marine Corps authorize the wearing of up to two EIC badges for a given weapon while the other military services authorize the wearing of only the highest ranking EIC badge for a given weapon on their service uniforms. Subdued versions of these badges are not authorized. With the exception of the U.S. Coast Guard, miniature versions of these badges are also not authorized. The U.S. Coast Guard has authorized the wear of special marksmanship devices on top of their marksmanship ribbons ( ) to denote the awarding of an EIC badge and is used when wearing the badge is not desired.

===== Changes in EIC badge design =====
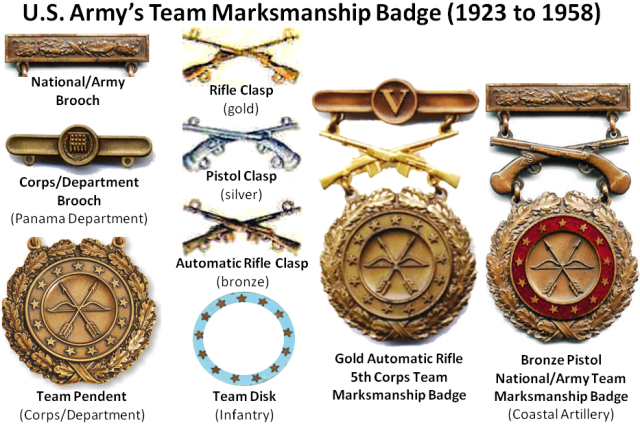
The Army Team Marksmanship Badges were replaced by the Army EIC Badges in 1958

From 1903 to 1958, the U.S. Army EIC badges were known as Team Marksmanship Badges. Prior to that, the Army awarded a variety of large unique marksmanship prize badges that went by a variety of names from 1880 to 1903. The original Team Marksmanship Badges were awarded in gold, silver, and bronze consisting of oval pendants with enameled targets in the center that were superimposed over crossed rifles with bayonets, crossed carbines with slings, a heavy machine gun, or placed between two revolvers. Above the enameled target was the letters "U.S."; but for a short time, the word "INFANTRY" or "CAVALRY" (unit dependent) appeared above the target while the letters U.S. were embossed beneath the target. The pendant hung from two different brooch designs. From 1903 to 1906 the brooch had rounded arrowhead ends (seen today in the U.S. Marine Corps's EIC badges) bearing the name "ARMY," "DEPARTMENT," or "DIVISION" reflecting the level of competition for which the badge was earned. In 1906 the brooch was redesigned with swallow-tail ends bearing the name of the Army corps marksmanship team flanked by the words "ARMY," on the left, and "TEAM," on the right. In 1923, the Army updated the Team Marksmanship Badges with a new three piece design which was awarded in three grades; gold, silver, and bronze for pistol, rifle, and automatic rifle. There were four components to this new badge; the brooch, clasp, Team Disk, and pendant. A plain brooch with a circular center device was used to identify an Army corps or department level award. A wreath laden brooch was used to identify a national or Army level award. A gold, silver, or bronze (score dependent) replica of either crossed Flintlock Pistols, Muskets, or M1918 Browning Automatic Rifles (BARs) hung from the brooch which supported the badge's bronze pendant. The pendant had a bow with two crossed arrows at its center surrounded by a ring of 13 stars which was encircled by an oak wreath. For national and Army level awards, an enameled ring, known as the Team Disk, was placed behind the pendant's ring of 13 stars and was colored to match the branch of service color of the awarded team. Today's Army EIC badges, which began in 1958, are almost identical to the Team Marksmanship Badges with the following exceptions: only one version of the brooch exists and bears the name "U.S. ARMY;" the crossed BARs, Team Disks, and gold version of the crossed weapons have been deleted. Also, the entire EIC badge is now cast in either bronze or silver, vise having just the crossed weapons being cast in the medal earned by the shooter.

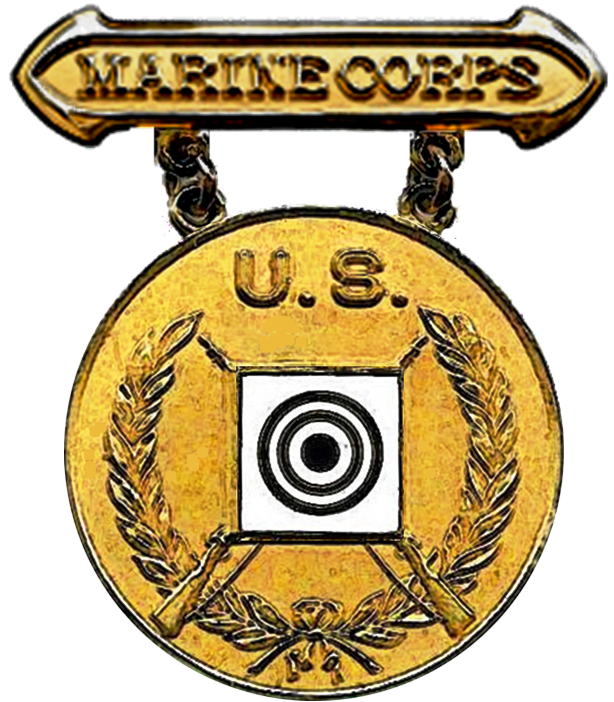
Former U.S. Marine Corps Gold Rifle Marksmanship Competition Badge

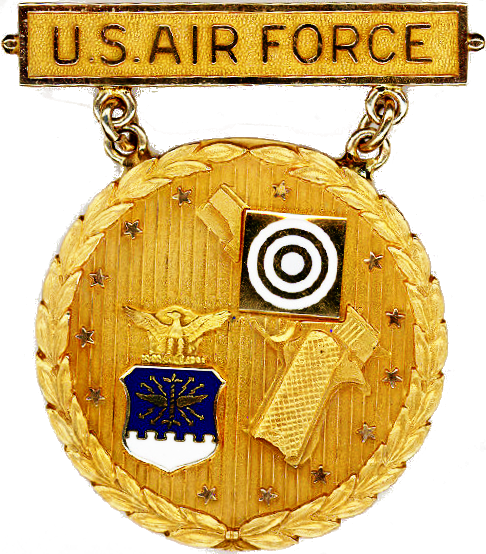
Former U.S. Air Force Gold National EIC Pistol Badge

When the U.S. Marine Corps authorized their first Marine Corps marksmanship competition badges in 1908, they used the pendant of the U.S. Army's 1907 designed Team Marksmanship Badges; however, the Marines used a unique brooch that had the name "MARINE CORPS" etch within it to help set it apart from the U.S. Army's 1907 version. Slowly, the Marine Corps's marksmanship competition badges took on their own distinctive characteristics. Between 1910 and 1930, the pendants started to be modified with the word "DIVISION" or the eagle, globe, and anchor replacing the letters "U.S." to signify winners of unit or service/national level competitions respectively. These marksmanship competition badges live on as the Marine Corps's EIC badges.

The U.S. Air Force used to award Silver and Gold Elementary EIC Rifle and Pistol Badges and Gold National EIC Rifle and Pistol Badges to its competition shooters. The EIC badges without wreaths were originally known as `non-national EIC badges' while those with wreaths were known as `national EIC badges'. With changes in U.S. Air Force instructions (AFI), the term non-national was replaced with elementary. In today's AFI, the elementary EIC badges are formally known as Bronze EIC Badges while the national EIC badges are formally known as either Bronze or Silver EIC Badges with Wreath. However, U.S. Air Force competitors still refer to these badges using their old designations (Elementary and National).

==== Distinguished marksmanship badges ====
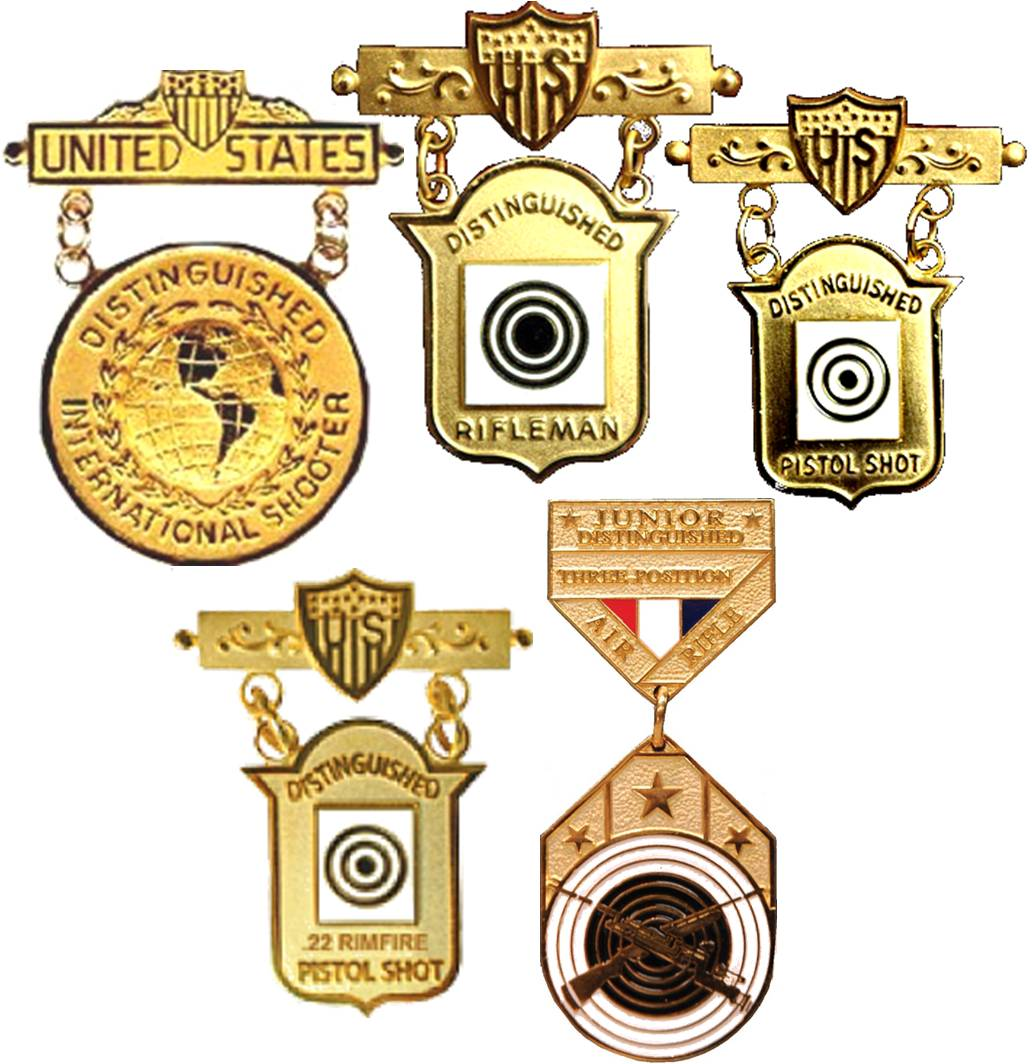
From top–left to lower–right: Distinguished International Shooter Badge, Distinguished Rifleman Badge, Distinguished Pistol Shot Badge, .22 Rimfire Pistol Distinguished Badge, and Junior Distinguished Badge

In 1884, the United States Secretary of War authorized the establishment of the "distinguished class" of marksman. In 1887, the Secretary authorized the first Distinguished Marksman Badge to recognize the shooters who achieved this distinguished class of marksman with the rifle, carbine, revolver, or any combination of the three. This continued until the establishment of the Distinguished Pistol Shot Badge in 1903 and the Distinguished Rifleman Badge in 1959. However, the Distinguished Marksman Badge is still awarded to distinguished rifle shooters of the sea services (U.S. Navy, U.S. Marine Corps, and U.S. Coast Guard). These two badges were the U.S. armed forces' highest awards for rifle and pistol marksmanship until 1962 when the CMP established the Distinguished International Shooter Badge. In 2001, the Junior Distinguished Badge was established for junior air rifle competitors while the CMP's newest distinguished program, the .22 Rimfire Pistol Distinguished Badge (authorized in 2015), has been established for adult and junior shooters alike. Today, the Distinguished International Shooter Badge is the highest award for marksmanship within the U.S. followed by the Distinguished Rifleman/Marksman Badge, the Distinguished Pistol Shot Badge, the .22 Rimfire Pistol Distinguished Badge, and the Junior Distinguished Badge.

As with all distinguished badges, a shooter must earn 30 leg points to be awarded the Distinguished International Shooter Badge. However, the means by which one earns these leg points is very different. International leg points are awarded based on a shooter's placement at international marksmanship competitions; specifically the Olympic Games, the World Championships, the World Clay Target Championships, the World Cup Finals, the World Cup, the Pan American Games, the Championship of the Americas, the World Junior Championships, and the Americas Junior Championships. Depending on where a shooter places in these games, individually or as a team, will dictate the number of international leg points earned.

The Distinguished International Shooter Badge consists of a gold brooch that is 1.8 inches in length inscribed with the words "United States;" perched above the words is a small modified shield from the Great Seal of the United States flanked by oak leaves. The pendant that hangs from this brooch is a gold disk 1.5 inches in diameter with a relief of the Earth, centered on the Western Hemisphere. Laurel leaves inscribed with the words "Distinguished International Shooter" surround the globe.

Each of the U.S. armed forces' and the CMP's distinguished Rifleman/Marksman and Pistol Shot Badges hangs from a service specific brooch. As with the Distinguished International Shooter Badge, the civilian brooch incorporates a modified shield from the Great Seal of the United States but has the letters "US" embossed on its face. The U.S. Army's brooch also incorporates this modified shield but has it perched above the words "U.S. ARMY" in the same manner as the Distinguished International Shooter Badge. The other military services have a plain rectangular brooch embossed with the name of their service. The rifle badge pendant of the U.S. Army, U.S. Air Force, and civilians is a gold shield 1 1/2 inches in height and 1 13/32 inches in width, in the center of which is an enameled replica of a rifle target. Around the target are the words "DISTINGUISHED" and "RIFLEMAN," which is arched above and stretched below the target respectively. The sea service's pendant displays the word "MARKSMAN" vs. RIFLEMAN underneath the target. The pistol badge pendant is similar in design to the rifle pendant but is 1 1/4 inches in height and 1 3/64 inches in width and has the words "PISTOL SHOT" stretched below an enameled replica of a pistol target. The exception to this rule is the Air Force Distinguished Pistol Shot pendant, which is identical to the rifle badge pendant but with the words "PISTOL SHOT" stretched under the enameled replica of a rifle target. This larger pistol pendant was also awarded to U.S. Coast Guard shooters between 1993 and 1996, but was rescinded in favor of the more traditional pistol pendant.

These badges are onetime decorations and may be worn on U.S. Armed Forces' service uniforms for the remainder of an individual's career. These badges may be worn simultaneously with the U.S. Army and U.S. Marine Corps marksmanship qualification badges as well as other authorized marksmanship competition badges not to exceed a total of three badges. However, once a Distinguished Rifleman/Marksman or Pistol Shot Badge has been awarded, the EIC badge for that weapon is no longer worn on military service uniforms. Subdued versions of these badges are not authorized. With the exception of the U.S. Coast Guard, miniature versions of these badges are also not authorized. The U.S. Coast Guard has authorized the wear of special marksmanship devices on top of their marksmanship ribbons ( ) to denote the awarding of a Distinguished Marksman or Pistol Shot Badge and is used when wearing of badges is not desired.

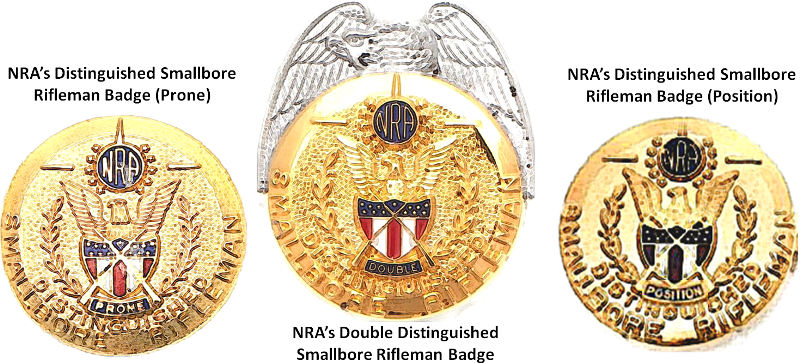
The NRA's Distinguished Smallbore Rifleman Badges

The NRA's Distinguished Smallbore Rifleman Badge (Prone) and Distinguished Smallbore Rifleman Badge (Position) were established in 1965 while the Double Distinguished Smallbore Rifleman Badge was established in 2009. The distinguished smallbore awards are considered more difficult to earn than the CMP's equivalent badge because shooters who have already achieved NRA's "distinguished status" are allowed to compete against those that have not yet achieved the award, thus raising the bar for the would-be smallbore distinguished rifleman. Four step certificates must be earned in order to be awarded one of these badges. A step certificate is earned by placing in the top ten percent at an Open Regional or National Championship, and only two step certificates per year will count towards "distinguished status." At least one step must be earned at the National Outdoor Championship. Therefore, it takes a minimum of two years to earn one of the distinguished smallbore rifleman badges.

NRA's newest distinguished program is their Distinguished Air Gun Program which was established in 2010. This program mirrors the NRA Distinguished Smallbore Rifle Program where four step certificates must be earned in order to be awarded the Three Position Precision Air Rifle Badge or the Three Position Sporter Air Rifle Badge. The Double Distinguished Air Rifle Badge is awarded when a shooter has earned four step certificates in both precision and sporter matches.

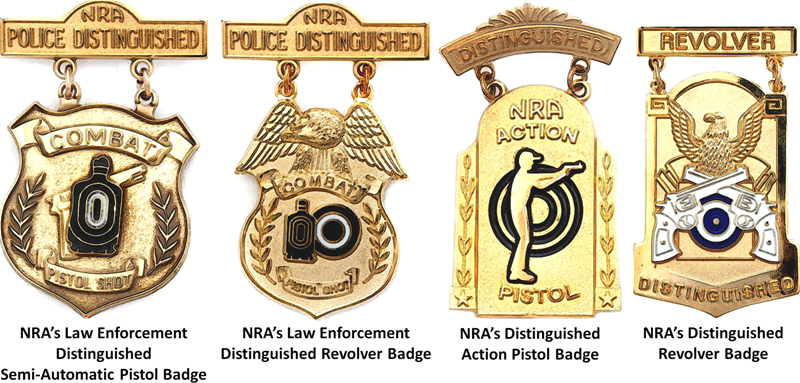
The NRA's Distinguished Pistol Badges

The NRA established the Law Enforcement Distinguished Marksmanship Program in 1973 with the introduction of the Law Enforcement Distinguished Revolver Badge. In 1990, the NRA amended the program by introducing the Law Enforcement Distinguished Semi-Automatic Pistol Badge. The Distinguished Action Pistol Badge and Conventional Pistol Distinguished Badge were established for U.S. civilian competitors in 1985 and 2005 respectively. Just like the CPRPFS programs, a 30 leg point system is used to earn these NRA distinguished badges and similar rules apply for how leg points are earned.

===== Former distinguished badges =====
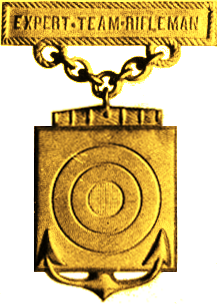
Former U.S. Navy Expert Team Rifleman Badge

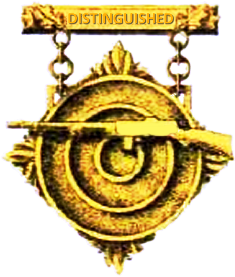
Former U.S. Army Distinguished Automatic Rifleman Badge

According to articles from American Rifleman Magazine and the U.S. Navy's Firing Regulations for Small Arms from the early 1900s, the U.S. Navy use to award a Navy Expert Team Rifleman Badge to U.S. Navy and U.S. Marine Corps personnel who qualified as expert rifleman numerous times and excelled in official rifle marksmanship competitions. The badge was designed "to encourage team competitions and to distinguish a class of officers and men who have shown superior skill in team competitions." To earn the Expert Team Rifleman Badge, a shooter must have qualified as expert with the service rifle four times and have high placement at three official rifle marksmanship competitions. In the U.S. Marine Corps's uniform regulation of 1922, the Navy Expert Team Rifleman Badge ranked between the Distinguished Marksman Badge and the Distinguished Pistol Shot Badge in precedence. It is not known when this badge was retired, but the badge did appear in the October 1943 edition of National Geographic Magazine, suggesting it was still an authorized decoration during World War II.

From 1930 through the late 1940s, the U.S. Army awarded the Distinguished Automatic Rifleman Badge to those who had earned the U.S. Army's Team Marksmanship Badge for BAR with sufficient points to qualify for "distinguished status." When marksmanship competitions resumed after World War II, the U.S. Army limited competitions to the rifle and pistol. Thus, the Distinguished Automatic Rifleman Badge was retired, along with the U.S. Army's Automatic Rifle Team Marksmanship Badge.

=== Competition ranking badges ===
==== President's Hundred Tab and Brassard ====
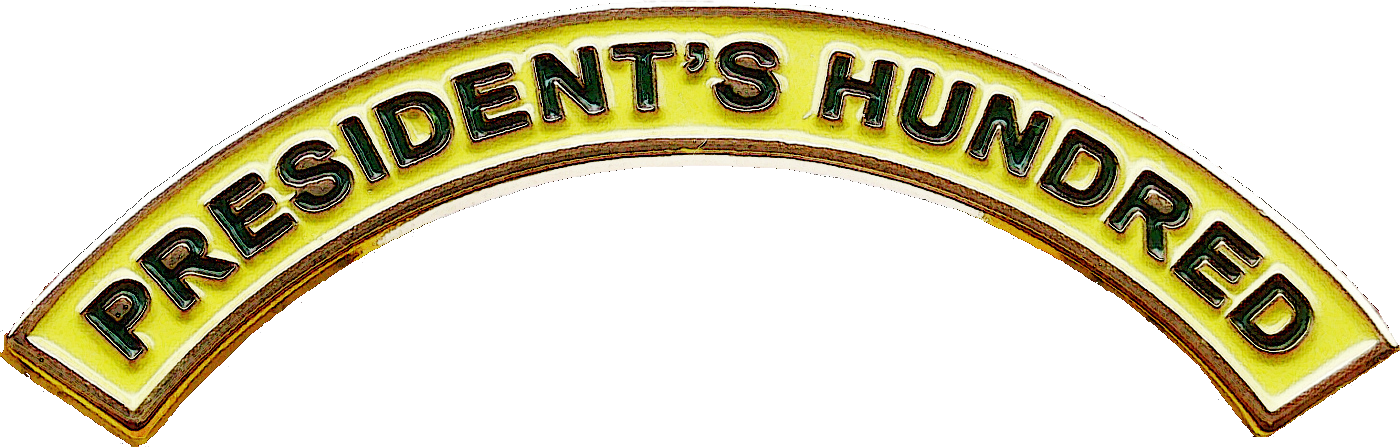
U.S. Army and U.S. Air Force service uniform badge version of tab

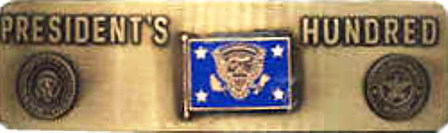
U.S. Navy and U.S. Civilian brassard version

The President's Hundred Tab and/or Brassard are presented to the 100 top-scoring U.S. military and U.S. civilian shooters at the President's Pistol Match and President's Rifle Match. The President's hundred award started in 1878 by the NRA at the American Military Rifle Championship Match, which was patterned after an event for British volunteers called The Queen's Match. In 1977, the event was turned over to the National Board for the Promotion of Rifle Practice, which later became the CPRPFS, and is managed by the CMP. All U.S. military and U.S. civilian personnel who earn this award are presented with a bronze metallic President's Hundred Brassard. However, only the U.S. Navy has authorized the wear of the metallic brassard, on the upper-left sleeve of enlisted service uniforms, as a permanent award. A cloth tab, with the words "President's Hundred," is worn by soldiers, airmen, and enlisted Coast Guardsman who have earned the brassard. An olive-drab version of the tab is worn on the upper-left sleeve of the U.S. Army combat uniform and airman battle uniform while a black and white version of the tab is worn on the upper-left sleeve of U.S. Coast Guard enlisted uniforms as a permanent award. A smaller gold metal replica of the tab, with green lettering, is worn on the left breast of the U.S. Army and U.S. Air Force service uniforms above or below ribbons and above medals.

==== U.S. Marine Corps specific competition badges ====
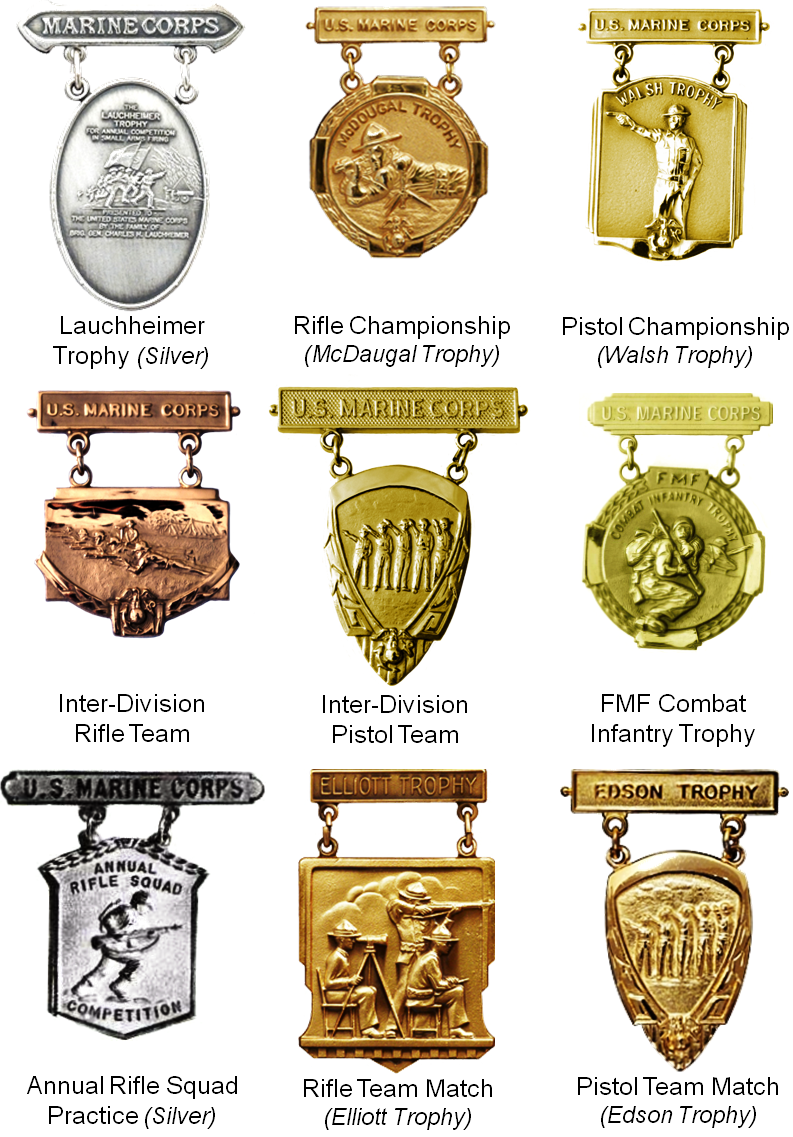

When the U.S. Marine Corps began its marksmanship qualification program in the early 20th century, it also establish a marksmanship competition program to help further advance the skills of its expert shooters. In the summer of 1908, the U.S. Marine Corps instituted the Distinguished Marksman Badge to recognition winners at the national marksmanship matches. That same year, the Commandant of the U.S. Marine Corps authorized the first U.S. Marine Corps-wide match by providing for four division matches. As a result of these early matches, the U.S. Marine Corps began to award competition specific marksmanship badges. Today, these badges are awarded alongside trophies and other prizes that are presented to the top performing Marines at U.S. Marine Corps competitions. The following are U.S. Marine Corps competition badges not associated with the CMP:

- Lauchheimer Trophy Badges (Gold, Silver, and Bronze)
- Marine Corps Rifle Championship Badge (McDougal Trophy)
- Marine Corps Pistol Championship Badge (Walsh Trophy)
- Inter-Division Rifle Competition Badge
- Inter-Division Pistol Competition Badge
- Fleet Marine Force (FMF) Combat Infantry Trophy Match Badge
- Annual Rifle Squad Combat Practice Competition Badges (Gold, Silver, and Bronze)
- Rifle Team Match Badges (San Diego, Wharton, Elliott, Wirgman, Lloyd, and Smith Trophies)
- Pistol Team Match Badges (Holcomb, Edson, Shively, and Pacific Trophies)

Of the 24 Marine Corps competition badges (not counting metal color/level), seven are part of the CMP while the 17 listed above are awarded for high placement at Marine Corps specific competitions. Of those 17 badges, one is truly unique as it is not solely focused on marksmanship but on a Marine Corps rifle squad's proficiency by demonstrating their capability for employment in combat. The Annual Rifle Squad Combat Practice Competition Badge is awarded to the top performing rifle squads within each Marine Corps infantry regiment or division. Each rifle squad is evaluated on their offensive tactics, defensive tactics, patrolling, marksmanship, and physical fitness. Each rifle squad can be accompanied by a U.S. Navy Hospital Corpsman, making this badge awardable to U.S. Navy personnel.

These badges are onetime decorations and may be worn on service uniforms for the remainder of a Marine's or sailor's military career. These badges may be worn simultaneously with Marine Corps marksmanship qualification badges as well as other authorized marksmanship competition badges not to exceed a total of three badges. Subdued and miniature versions are not authorized.

==== U.S. Army Interservice Competition Badges ====
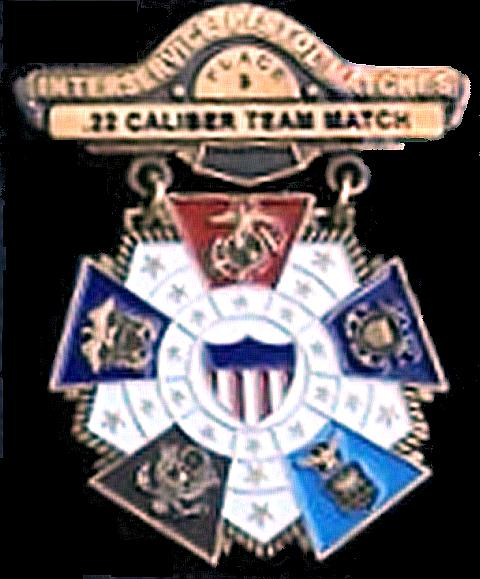
U.S. Army Interservice Competition Badge (Bronze), awarded at the Interservice Pistol Matches for 3rd place at the .22 Caliber Team Match

Unlike the other marksmanship competition badges, unique Army Interservice Competition Badges are awarded to soldiers and U.S. Army marksmanship teams that place in the top three positions of an interservice match. These badges are separate awards from the CPRPFS's distinguished marksmanship programs, where a competitor earns leg points towards "distinguished status." The pentagon shaped multicolored pendant centerpiece of the Army Interservice Competition Badge incorporates the emblems of the five military services which surround a modified shield from the Great Seal of the United States flanked by gold stars on a white enameled background. This pendent centerpiece is placed in a pentagon shaped decorative metal frame. This elaborate two piece pendant hangs from an equally elaborate brooch made of the same metal as the pendant's frame and bears the name of the event (in the top arch), the match (in the bottom bar), and the competitor's or team's ranking at that match (in the center half-circle). The brooch, the pendant's frame, and each of the service's emblems are cast in either gold (for 1st place), silver (for 2nd place), or bronze (for 3rd place).

The Army Interservice Competition Badges are onetime decorations and may be worn on U.S. Army service uniforms for the remainder of a soldier's military career. These badges may be worn simultaneously with the Army Marksmanship Qualification Badges as well as other authorized marksmanship competition badges not to exceed a total of three badges. However, only one Army Interservice Competition Badge can be worn at a time. Subdued and miniature versions are not authorized.

==== U.S. National Guard/state competition badges ====
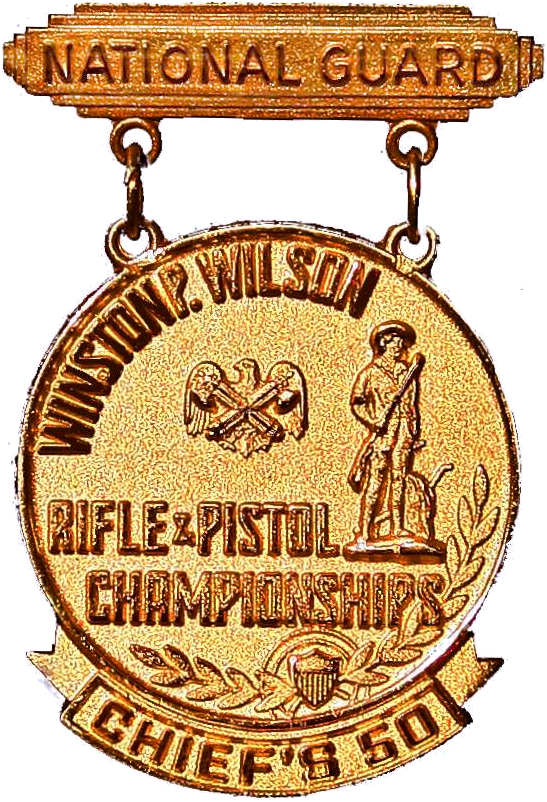
The National Guard Bureau's Chief's 50 Marksmanship Badge

Once a year, thousands of U.S. Army and U.S. Air National Guard shooters (champion marksmanship teams from each state) compete against each other at the Winston P. Wilson Rifle and Pistol Championships (a.k.a. the National Guard Small Arms Championships or the WPW Matches), held at the National Guard Marksmanship Training Center at Camp Joseph T. Robinson, Arkansas. Guardsman compete as teams and/or individuals with combat rifles, combat pistols, machine guns, and sniper rifles for top honors within the National Guard. At the conclusion of the WPW Matches, the Chief of the National Guard Bureau awards the Chief's Fifty Marksmanship Badge to the top twenty-one combat rifle, top twenty-one combat pistol, top two machine gun teams, and top two sniper teams.

The Chief's Fifty Marksmanship Badge is a gold-plated circular medal, 1 1/8th inches in diameter suspended from a gold-plated multi-tiered rectangular brooch embossed with the words "NATIONAL GUARD." The medal is embossed with the words "Winston P. Wilson Rifle and Pistol Championships," the National Guard Bureau Branch Insignia, and the Minuteman on its face. At the base of the medal is a gold scroll embossed with the words "CHIEF"S 50." The Chief's Fifty Marksmanship Badge was made official in 1978 and made retroactive to 1971.

Guardsmen are authorized to wear the Chief's Fifty Marksmanship Badge as a permanent decoration on service uniforms, to the left of federal marksmanship badges and awards, when operating under Title 32 (state control) status. When federalized (Title 10), Guardsman cannot wear the badge on U.S. Army or U.S. Air Force service uniforms until they return to Title 32 status.

Maryland's Law Enforcement Governor's 20 Badge

The NRA sponsors a Law Enforcement Governor's Twenty Badge which is designed to recognize the top Twenty law enforcement officers from each state for excellence in police combat pistol competition. Each state's program is administered by their respective league or association. Typically, the top three scores of each officer is averaged and the top twenty officers are recognized with the Governor's Twenty Badge. Although sponsored by the NRA, each state's badge has its own unique design.

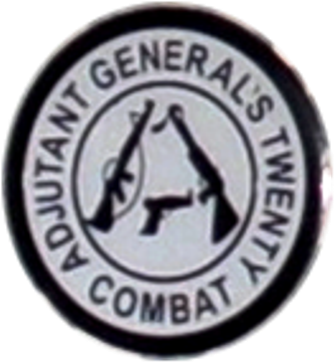
Missouri National Guard Adjutant General's Twenty Combat Badge

Some states have marksmanship badges that are awarded by their State Adjutant General, such as the Missouri National Guard Adjutant General's Twenty Combat Badge. This circular badge is awarded to those guardsmen who place in the top twenty competitors at the state's annual combat matches for the rifle/pistol championships. Some 100 shooters compete in the annual state matches and participants compete against other Guardsman who have already received the award; thus there might only be one or two new recipients of the badge each year.

The Missouri Adjutant General's Twenty Combat Badge was created in the 1980s to recognize the top eight rifle, eight pistol, two machine gun, and two sniper shooters at the state's annual combat matches. As those matches changed, the award shifted to the top twenty competitors at the state's rifle/pistol championships.

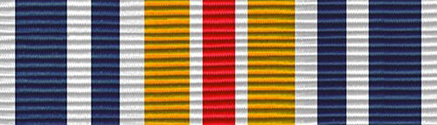
The badge is worn centered on the right breast pocket of the U.S. Army combat uniform and airman battle uniform. Also, recipients of this badge are awarded the Missouri Adjutant General's Twenty Ribbon ( ) for wear on U.S. Army and U.S. Air Force service uniforms. Just like the Chief's Fifty and Governor's Twenty awards, the Adjutant General's Twenty Combat Badge and Ribbon are state-level awards and can only be worn on U.S. Army and U.S. Air Force uniforms when operating under Title 32 of the U.S. Code.

==== Former competition ranking badges ====
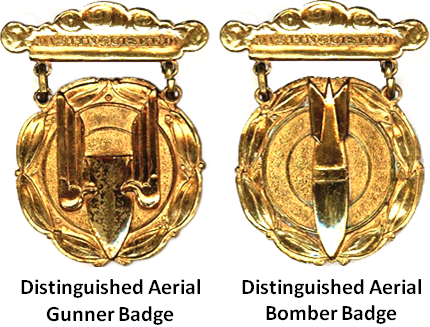

Starting in 1926, the U.S. Army Air Corps began awarding distinguished aerial badges. The Air Corps held three gunnery matches; one for pursuit pilots, one for observation and attack pilots, and one for observers. They also held two bombing matches, one for heavier-than-air craft and one for balloons. Winners of these matches received either the Distinguished Aerial Gunner Badge or the Distinguished Aerial Bomber Badge. These matches were suspended in 1932; thus, it is assumed these badges were retired sometime after that date.

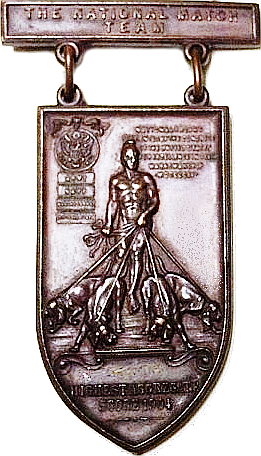
Former National Trophy Match Badge

In 1903, the 57th U.S. Congress created the National Marksmanship Competition Matches which provided for the creation of the National Match (Dogs of War) Trophy. Winners of the National Match (Dogs of War) Trophy were also awarded an antique bronze National Trophy Match (Dogs of War) Badge along with the top 15% of the teams that competed in these matches.

The pendant of the National Trophy Match (Dogs of War) Badge replicated the bronze shield of the national trophy which had the names of the four military services, at that time, (the Army, Navy, Marine Corps, and National Guard) embossed on small rectangles below a small replica of the Great Seal of the United States on the left side of the badge's pendant. To the right of this was a prominent design of an ancient warrior with four dogs on leashes (the dogs of war). To the right of the warrior was the following embossed phrase: "National Trophy Presented by the Congress of the United States for Excellence in Team Marksmanship." Below the leashed dogs, at the base of the pendant, is a short embossed statement reflecting why the badge was awarded. This pendant hung from a plain rectangular brooch embossed with the words "THE NATIONAL MATCH TEAM," with the exception of the 1913 badge which was embossed with "NATIONAL TEAM MATCH 1913."

As with today's Army Interservice Competition Badges, the awarding of the National Trophy Match (Dogs of War) Badge was separate from the leg points used towered "distinguished status," but did count towards a now defunct requirement whereby an individual must earn a certain number of marksmanship awards, in addition to the required 30 leg points, to achieve "distinguished status." In 1919 this badge gave way to National Trophy Match (Dogs of War) Medals. Although this historic badge is still authorized for wear on U.S. Army service uniforms, today teams that win this prestigious trophy are presented with a National Trophy Match (Dogs of War) Plaque.

== See also ==
- Badges of the United States Air Force
- Badges of the United States Army
- Badges of the United States Coast Guard
- Former U.S. Navy Distinguished Marksmanship Ribbons
- German Armed Forces Badge of Marksmanship
- Obsolete badges of the United States military
- Obsolete military awards of the United States
- United States Army Sniper School
- United States Marine Corps Scout Sniper
