= Trident University International =

California-based online for-profit university

- Former names: TUI University, Trident University International
- Motto: Aspire, Believe, Achieve
- Type: Private for-profit online university
- Established: 1998; 28 years ago; 2007; 19 years ago new university established
- Accreditation: HLC
- Chancellor: John Kline
- President: Sunitha Araamudhu
- Provost: Dr. Ruki Jayaraman
- Students: 10,997
- Undergraduates: 6,830
- Postgraduates: 4,167
- Location: Chandler, Arizona, United States
- Campus: Online
- Colors: Navy Blue and "Old" Gold
- Website: www.trident.edu

Trident University International is a private, for-profit online university based in Chandler, Arizona. It is a member of the American InterContinental University System and accredited by the Higher Learning Commission. It is owned by Perdoceo Education Corporation, formerly known as Career Education Corporation (CEC).

Trident offers five doctoral degree programs, eight master's degree programs, eight bachelor's degree programs, an associate degree program, and six professional certificate and diploma programs.

== History ==
The institution was founded as Touro University International, a branch campus of Touro College, in July 1998, by Yoram Neumann and Edith Neumann. It was the first university in the world to offer a regionally accredited doctorate program online with no residency requirement. Touro University International was initially accredited by the Middle States Commission on Higher Education (MSCHE). Touro College, including the Touro University International branch campus, was subsequently re-accredited by MSCHE in 2004. Because of its location in California, growth, fiscal and operational stability, and online delivery model, Touro University International was separately accredited by the Western Association of Schools and Colleges (WASC) in February 2005.

In October 2007, Touro University International was sold to Summit Partners for 190 million dollars and a new institution, TUI University (now Trident at AIU) was formed and incorporated as a private for profit. The deal was seen by many as part of a larger trend of nonprofit higher education entities being taken for-profit, but the Touro deal was unusual in that it may have been the first sale by a nonprofit college of one of its divisions. In January 2011, TUI University officially changed its name to Trident University International. On March 29, 2015, Jones International University (JIU) announced it would close in 2016 and that it had entered into a formal teach-out transfer agreement with Trident University International: all JIU students would be provided with the opportunity to transition their studies to Trident. Trident also announced plans to rename its business school The Glenn R. Jones College of Business Administration. In March 2019, Career Education Corporation entered into an agreement to acquire Trident University International for $35 – 44 million from Summit Partners and merged this acquisition into Career Education Corporation's American InterContinental University as a branch campus. Trident at AIU was officially granted accreditation by the Higher Learning Commission on February 19, 2020, and withdrew from WASC shortly thereafter. Trident University International closed its Cypress, California office as part of the merger with American InterContinental University (AIU) and opened an office in Chandler, Arizona by late 2020. Trident at AIU opened a new satellite office in San Antonio, Texas in April 2021.

Trident does not accept applications from residents of Massachusetts and New York.

=== Investigations and controversies ===
In June 2011, the WSCUC Commission received information that Trident awarded baccalaureate degrees to students who had not fulfilled the university's general education (GE) requirements. In addition, Trident failed to notify WSCUC of this problem when it was first brought to the institution's attention by the Servicemembers Opportunity College (SOCNAV), an organization that works with the United States Navy to assure that the colleges that Navy personnel attend are appropriately accredited and military friendly. Because of the serious breach of Standards One and Two related to integrity and general education, the Commission issued an Order to Show Cause why Trident's accreditation should not be terminated effective March 30, 2012. The following year, the commission confirmed that Trident had satisfactorily addressed the issues and reaffirmed Trident's accreditation.

As of 2015, Trident was under heightened cash monitoring by the United States Department of Education "to provide additional oversight of cash management."

In 2017, the Veterans Education Success organization alleged that Trident had used misleading information to recruit "survivors" who had Post-9/11 GI Bill benefits. Survivors are the children of a father or mother who was killed while on active duty and their widows or husbands.

On August 30, 2018, a Citation and Order of Abatement was issued by the California Bureau for Private Postsecondary Education a unit of the California Department of Consumer Affairs. The Bureau received information from the U.S. Department of Education in early 2018 that Trident University International, Institution Code 27129873, has a composite score of 0.2 out of a possible 3.0, which is considered by the U.S. Department of Education as not being financially responsible.

On March 9, 2020, the Department of Veterans Affairs (VA) suspended G.I. Bill reimbursement eligibility for American InterContinental University and several other for-profit schools, including Trident at AIU, due to what the department said were "erroneous, deceptive, or misleading enrollment and advertising practices," giving the schools 60 days to take "corrective action." Later that year, the VA reversed its action.

== Academics ==
Trident is a member of the American InterContinental University System. The System is institutionally accredited by the Higher Learning Commission. In 2022 Trident University's Bachelor of Science in Business Administration (BSBA), Bachelor of Science in Human Resource Management (BSHRM), Master of Business Administration (MBA), and Doctor of Business Administration (DBA) programs were granted programmatic accreditation by the Accreditation Council for Business Schools and Programs (ACBSP) under the American InterContinental University System (AIUS).

Trident offers undergraduate, graduate, and doctoral level degrees in a 100% online environment in the following colleges:

- Glenn R. Jones College of Business
- College of Education
- College of Health and Human Services
- College of Information Systems

=== Rankings ===
In Washington Monthly's 2021 National University Rankings, Trident was ranked 228 out of 381 national universities and 56th in the western region for "Best Bang for the Buck.". Trident was not included in Washington Monthly's rankings from 2022 through 2025.

=== Student outcomes ===
According to the National Center for Education Statistics, as of 2024 Trident at AIU has a 6-year bachelor's degree graduation rate of 8% and only a 20% retention rate for first time students pursuing bachelor's degrees.

== Notable alumni ==
- James A. Cody, Chief Master Sergeant of the Air Force
- Ben Franklin, member of the Wisconsin State Assembly
- William Gainey, United States Army Command Sergeant Major
- David O'Donahue, Brigadier General, deputy adjutant general of the Wisconsin National Guard
- Kenneth Preston, 13th sergeant major of the Army
- Ian Roberts, former superintendent of Des Moines Public Schools
- Stephen Templin, bestselling author of SEAL Team Six: Memoirs of an Elite Navy SEAL Sniper
- Tony Tinderholt, member of the Texas House of Representatives
- John W. Troxell, United States Army Command Sergeant Major
