= Admiral (United States) =

Rank in some US uniformed services

- Flag of an admiral of the unrestricted line, United States Navy.

- The service khaki collar insignia of a U.S. Navy admiral.

- The shoulder stars, shoulder boards, and sleeve stripes of a U.S. Navy admiral of the "line".
- Country: United States
- Service branch: United States Navy; United States Coast Guard; United States Public Health Service
- Abbreviation: ADM
- Rank group: Flag officer
- Rank: Four-star
- NATO rank code: OF-9
- Pay grade: O-10
- Formation: July 25, 1866; 160 years ago
- Next higher rank: Fleet admiral
- Next lower rank: Vice admiral
- Equivalent ranks: General (Uniformed services of the United States)

Admiral (abbreviated as ADM) is a four-star commissioned officer rank in the United States Navy, the United States Coast Guard, and the United States Public Health Service Commissioned Corps with the pay grade of O-10. Admiral ranks above vice admiral and below fleet admiral in the Navy; the Coast Guard and the Public Health Service do not have an established grade above admiral. Admiral is equivalent to the rank of general in the other uniformed services. The National Oceanic and Atmospheric Administration Commissioned Officer Corps (NOAA Corps) has never had an officer hold the grade of admiral. However, 37 U.S.C. § 201 of the U.S. Code established the grade for the NOAA Corps, in case a position is created that merits the four-star grade.

Since the five-star grade of fleet admiral has not been used since 1946, the grade of admiral is the highest appointment an officer can achieve in the United States Navy, the United States Coast Guard, and the United States Public Health Service Commissioned Corps.

== Address ==
Formally, "Admiral" is always used when referring to a four-star admiral, and informally "Full Admiral", "Four-star Admiral" (or simply four-star), or "O-10" (in reference to pay grade). The informal terms are used to distinguish a four-star admiral from the lower-ranking admirals who may also be referred to as "Admiral".

== History ==
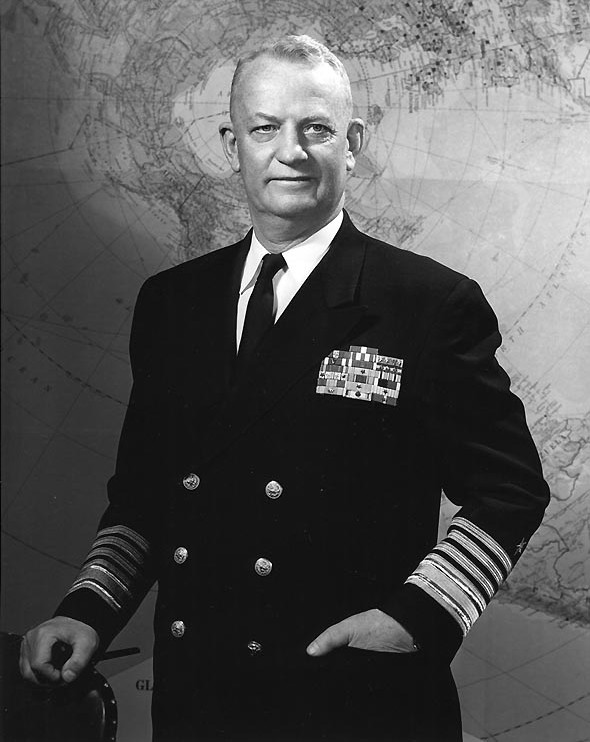
Admiral Arleigh Burke, the person with the longest tenure as Chief of Naval Operations, in a uniform with the post-1869 sleeve style

The United States Navy did not have any admirals until 1862, because many Americans felt the title was "too reminiscent of royalty". Others saw the need for ranks above captain, among them John Paul Jones, who pointed out that the Navy had to have officers who "ranked" with army generals. He also felt there must be ranks above captain to avoid disputes among senior captains. The various secretaries of the navy repeatedly recommended to Congress that admiral ranks be created because the other navies of the world used them and American senior officers were "often subjected to serious difficulties and embarrassments in the interchange of civilities with those of other nations." Congress finally authorized nine rear admirals on July 16, 1862, although that was probably more for the needs of the rapidly expanding navy during the American Civil War than any international considerations.

Two years later, Congress authorized the appointment of a vice admiral from among the nine rear admirals: David Farragut. Another bill allowed the President of the United States to appoint Farragut to admiral on July 25, 1866, and David Dixon Porter to vice admiral. When Farragut died in 1870, Porter became admiral and Stephen C. Rowan was promoted to vice admiral. When Rowan (1890) and Porter (1891) died, Congress did not allow the promotion of any of the rear admirals to succeed them, so there were no more admirals or vice admirals by promotion until 1915 when Congress authorized an admiral and a vice admiral each for the Atlantic, Pacific and Asiatic Fleets.

There was one admiral in the interim, however. In 1899, Congress recognized George Dewey's accomplishments during the Spanish–American War by authorizing the President to appoint him Admiral of the Navy. He held that rank until he died in 1917. Nobody has since held that title. In 1944, Congress approved the five-star grade of fleet admiral. The first to hold it were William D. Leahy, Ernest J. King, and Chester W. Nimitz. The Senate confirmed their appointments December 15, 1944. Fleet Admiral William F. Halsey got his fifth star in December 1945. Nimitz (died 1966) was the last of these four fleet admirals, and no others have been appointed since.

The sleeve stripes now used by admirals and vice admirals in the United States date from March 11, 1869, when General Order Number 90 specified that for their "undress" uniforms admirals would wear a two-inch stripe with three half-inch stripes above it and vice admirals the two-inch stripe with two half-inch stripes above it. The rear admiral got his two-inch stripe and one half-inch stripe in 1866.

The sleeve stripes had been more elaborate. When the rear admiral rank started in 1862 the sleeve arrangement was three stripes of three-quarter-inch lace alternating with three stripes of quarter-inch lace. It was some ten inches from top to bottom. The vice admiral, of course, had even more stripes and when Farragut became admiral in 1866, he had so many stripes they reached from his cuffs almost to his elbow. On their dress uniforms the admirals wore bands of gold embroidery of live oak leaves and acorns.

The admirals of the 1860s wore the same number of stars on their shoulders as admirals of corresponding grades do today. In 1899, the navy's one admiral (Dewey) and 18 rear admirals put on the new shoulder marks, as did the other officers when wearing their white uniforms, but kept their stars instead of repeating the sleeve cuff stripes.

During the 20th century, the ranks of the modern U.S. admiralty were firmly established. An oddity that did exist was that the navy did not have a one-star rank except briefly during World War II when Congress established a temporary war rank of commodore. The one-star rank was later established permanently in 1986.

== Statutory limits ==
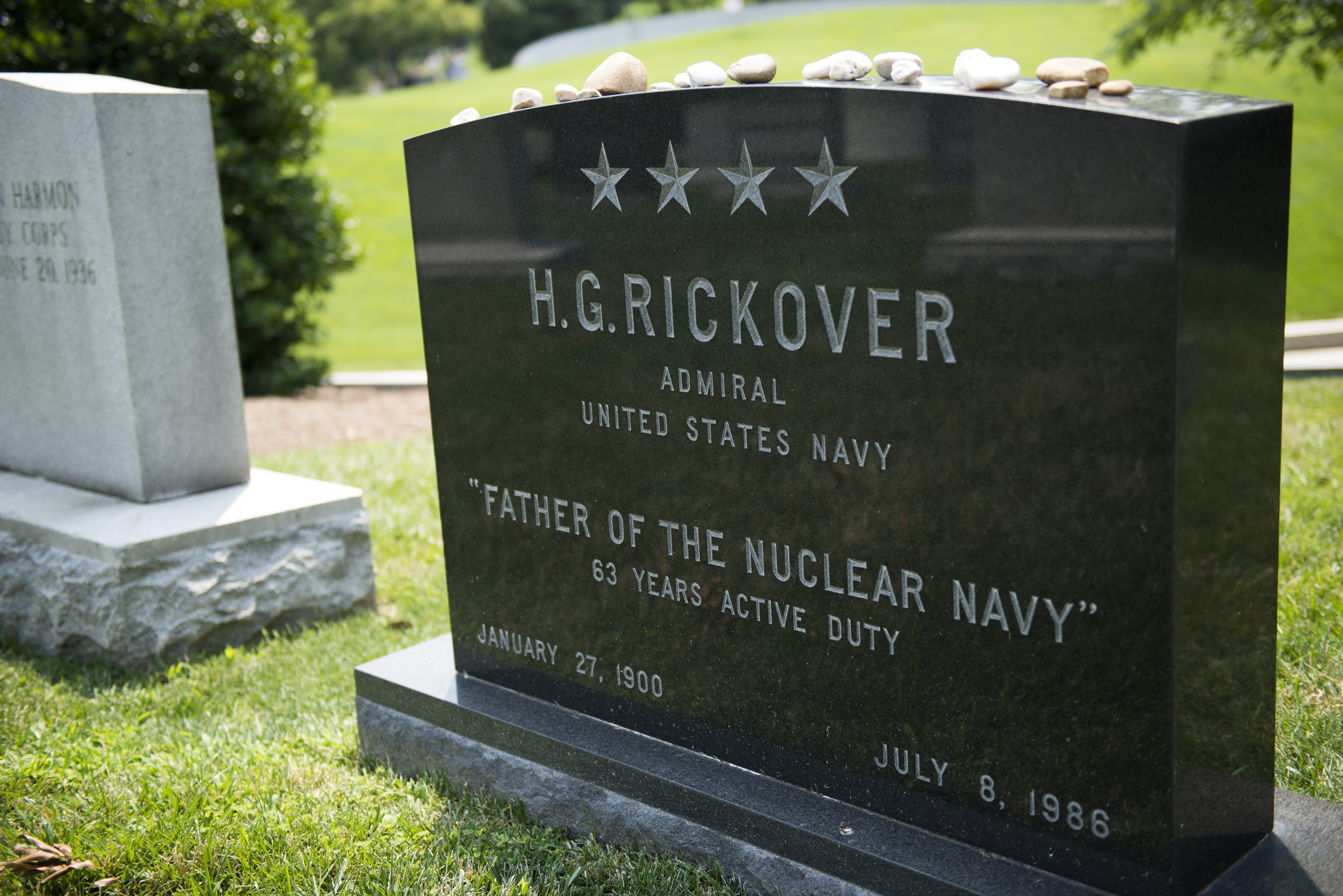
Grave of Admiral Hyman G. Rickover, with four-star insignia.

U.S. law limits the number of four-star admirals that may be on active duty at any time. The total number of active-duty flag officers is capped at 150 for the Navy. For the Army, Navy, and Air Force, no more than about 21% of the service's active-duty general or flag officers may have more than two stars, with the corresponding ratio for the Space Force being one-third, and statute sets the total number of four-star officers allowed in each service. This is set at 6 four-star Navy admirals. However, exceptions to this limit are made to meet operational needs. As of July 2020, there were 9 four star admirals serving on active duty with the U.S. Navy.

Some of these slots are reserved by statute. For the Navy, the Chief of Naval Operations and Vice Chief of Naval Operations are admirals; for the Coast Guard the Commandant of the Coast Guard and Vice Commandant of the Coast Guard are admirals; for the Public Health Service Commissioned Corps, the Assistant Secretary for Health is an admiral if they hold an appointment to the regular corps.

There are several exceptions to these limits allowing more than allotted within the statute. A Navy admiral serving as Chairman or Vice Chairman of the Joint Chiefs of Staff does not count against the Navy's flag-officer cap. A Navy admiral serving in one of several joint positions does not count against his or her service's four-star limit; these positions include the commander of a unified combatant command, the commander of U.S. Forces Korea, and the deputy commander of U.S. European Command but only if the commander of that command is also the Supreme Allied Commander, Europe. Officers serving in certain intelligence positions are not counted against either limit, including the Director of the Central Intelligence Agency. The President may also add admirals to the Navy if they are offset by removing an equivalent number of four-stars from other services. Finally, all statutory limits may be waived at the President's discretion during time of war or national emergency.

== Appointment and tour length ==
Four-star grades go hand-in-hand with the positions of office they are linked to, so these ranks are temporary. Officers may only achieve four-star grade if they are appointed to positions that require the officer to hold such a rank. Their rank expires with the expiration of their term of office, which is usually set by statute. Admirals are nominated for appointment by the President from any eligible officers holding the rank of rear admiral (lower half) or above, who also meets the requirements for the position, under the advice and/or suggestion of their respective department secretary, service secretary, and if applicable the joint chiefs. For some specific positions, statute allows the President to waive those requirements for a nominee whom he deems would serve national interests. The nominee must be confirmed via majority vote by the Senate before the appointee can take office and thus assume the rank. The standard tour length for most four-star positions is three years, bundled as a two-year term plus a one-year extension, with the following exceptions:

- The Chief of Naval Operations serves for four years in one four-year term.
- The Director of Naval Nuclear Propulsion serves for a nominal eight years.
- The Commandant of the Coast Guard serves for a nominal four years.

Extensions of the standard tour length can be approved, within statutory limits, by their respective service secretaries, the secretary of defense, the President, and/or Congress but these are rare, as they block other officers from being promoted. Some statutory limits under the U.S. Code can be waived in times of national emergency or war. Admiral ranks may also be given by act of Congress but this is extremely rare.

== Retirement ==
Other than voluntary retirement, statute sets a number of mandates for retirement. Four-star officers must retire after 40 years of service unless reappointed to grade to serve longer. Otherwise all flag officers must retire one month after their 64th birthday. However, the Secretary of Defense can defer a four-star officer's retirement until the officer's 66th birthday and the President can defer it until the officer's 68th birthday.

Since there are a limited number of four-star slots available to each service, typically one officer must leave office before another can be promoted. Maintaining a four-star rank is a game of musical chairs; once an officer vacates a position bearing that rank, they have no more than 60 days to be appointed or reappointed to a position of equal importance before they must involuntarily retire. Historically, officers leaving four-star positions were allowed to revert to their permanent two-star ranks to mark time in lesser jobs until statutory retirement, but now such officers are expected to retire immediately to avoid obstructing the promotion flow.

== Gallery ==
Historical admiral insignia (1866–1869).

U.S. Navy, U.S. Coast Guard, and U.S. Public Health Service collar insignia

The collar stars, shoulder boards, and sleeve stripes of a U.S. Coast Guard admiral

The collar stars, shoulder boards, and sleeve stripes of a U.S. Public Health Service admiral
Rank flag of a U.S. Coast Guard admiral (unrestricted line officer)

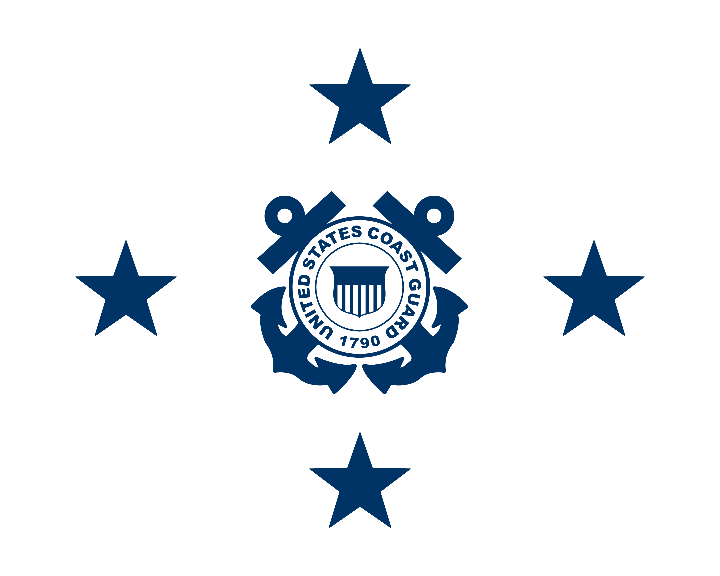
Flag of a US Coast Guard Restricted Line Officer / Staff Officer Admiral

Rank flag of a U.S. Public Health Service admiral (serves as Assistant Secretary for Health)

Flag of a US Navy Restricted Line Officer / Staff Officer Admiral

== See also ==
- U.S. Navy officer rank insignia
- List of active duty United States four-star officers
- List of United States Navy four-star admirals
- List of United States Coast Guard four-star admirals
- List of United States Public Health Service Commissioned Corps four-star admirals
