= 73rd Cavalry Regiment =

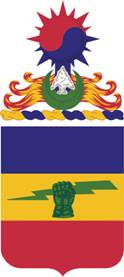
- 73rd Cavalry Regiment coat of arms
- Active: 1941
- Country: United States
- Branch: Regular Army
- Part of: USARS
- Nickname: Airborne Thunder (Special Designation)
- Mottos: Honor, Fidelity, Courage

Insignia
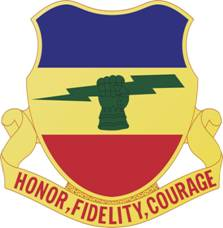
- Distinctive unit insignia

- Former 1st, 3rd, 4th, and 5th Squadron, 73rd Cavalry Regiment Beret Flashes

- 73rd Armor Regiment Beret Flash

The 73rd Cavalry Regiment is a Cavalry Regiment in the United States Army, first formed in 1941. Three squadrons of the 73rd Cavalry Regiment ("Airborne Thunder") provided reconnaissance, surveillance, and target acquisition (RSTA) to the Brigade Combat Teams of the 82nd Airborne Division through July 2024 when the last of the three squadrons was deactivated. 3rd Squadron was assigned to 1st Brigade, 1st Squadron was assigned to 2nd Brigade, 5th Squadron was assigned to 3rd Brigade, and 4th Squadron was assigned to 4th Brigade.

Formerly organized as the 4th Battalion of the 68th Armor Regiment, the 3rd Battalion (Airborne) 73rd Armor Regiment was equipped with M-551 Sheridan and LAV-25 armored and reconnaissance vehicles to support the 82nd Airborne Division with light armor support.

The 4/73rd Armor Regiment was a 1st Infantry Division Forward unit at Panzer Kaserne in Boblingen, Germany during the Cold War. 1/73 Armor Regiment was stationed at Camp Beavers, South Korea, from 1963 to 1971.

== Lineage ==
Activated 1 June 1941 at Fort Lewis, Washington.

- Inactivated 8 February 1946 at Camp Kilmer, New Jersey.

Activated 1 August 1948 at Fort Benning, Georgia.

- Reorganized and redesignated 15 January 1948 as the 756th Heavy Tank Battalion, and assigned to the 3rd Infantry Division.
- Reorganized and redesignated 14 July 1950 as the 73rd Tank Battalion, and relieved from assignment to the 3d Infantry Division.

Assigned 10 November 1951 to the 7th Infantry Division.

- Inactivated 1 July 1957 in Korea and relieved from assignment to the 7th Infantry Division.

Reorganized and redesignated 2 October 1962 as the 73d Armor a parent regiment under the Combat Arms Regimental System.

- 4 March 1984 3rd Battalion (Airborne) 73rd Armor, Activated and Assigned to the 82nd Airborne Division, Fort Bragg, North Carolina.
- Withdrawn 16 January 1988 from the Combat Arms Regimental System, and Reorganized under the United States Army Regimental System, with headquarters at Fort Bragg, North Carolina.
- Inactivate 15 July 1997 of the 3rd Battalion, 73rd Armor Regiment at Fort Bragg, North Carolina

Campaign Participation Credit

World War II - Algeria-French Morocco (with Arrowhead), Naples-Foggia, Rome-Arno, Southern France (with Arrowhead), Rhineland, Ardennes-Alsace, Central Europe;
Korean War - UN Defensive, UN Offensive, CCF Intervention, First UN Counteroffensives, CCF Spring Offensive, UN Summer-Fall Offensive, Second Korean Winter, Third Korean Winter, Korea, summer 1953;
Armed Forces Expeditions - Panama (with arrowhead);
Southwest Asia- Defense of Saudi Arabia, Liberation and Defense of Kuwait;
War on terrorism - Iraq: National Resolution, Iraqi Surge, Iraqi Sovereignty

DECORATIONS: Presidential Unit Citation (Army), Streamer embroidered COLMAR, French Croix de Guerre with Palm, World War II, Streamer embroidered CENTRAL ITALY, French Croix de Guerre with Silver-Gilt Star, World War II, Streamer embroidered ITALY, Republic of Korea Presidential Unit Citation, Streamer embroidered INCHON TO SEOUL, Republic of Korea Presidential Unit Citation, Streamer embroidered KOREA 1950-1952, Republic of Korea Presidential Unit Citation, Streamer embroidered KOREA 1951-1953, Republic of Korea Presidential Unit Citation, Streamer embroidered KOREA 1951-1957, Presidential Unit Citation (Army), Streamer embroidered TURKI VILLAGE, IRAQ, Meritorious Unit Commendation (Army), Streamer embroidered IRAQ 2006-2007 Meritorious Unit Commendation (Army), Streamer embroidered IRAQ 2008-2009

== Current status ==
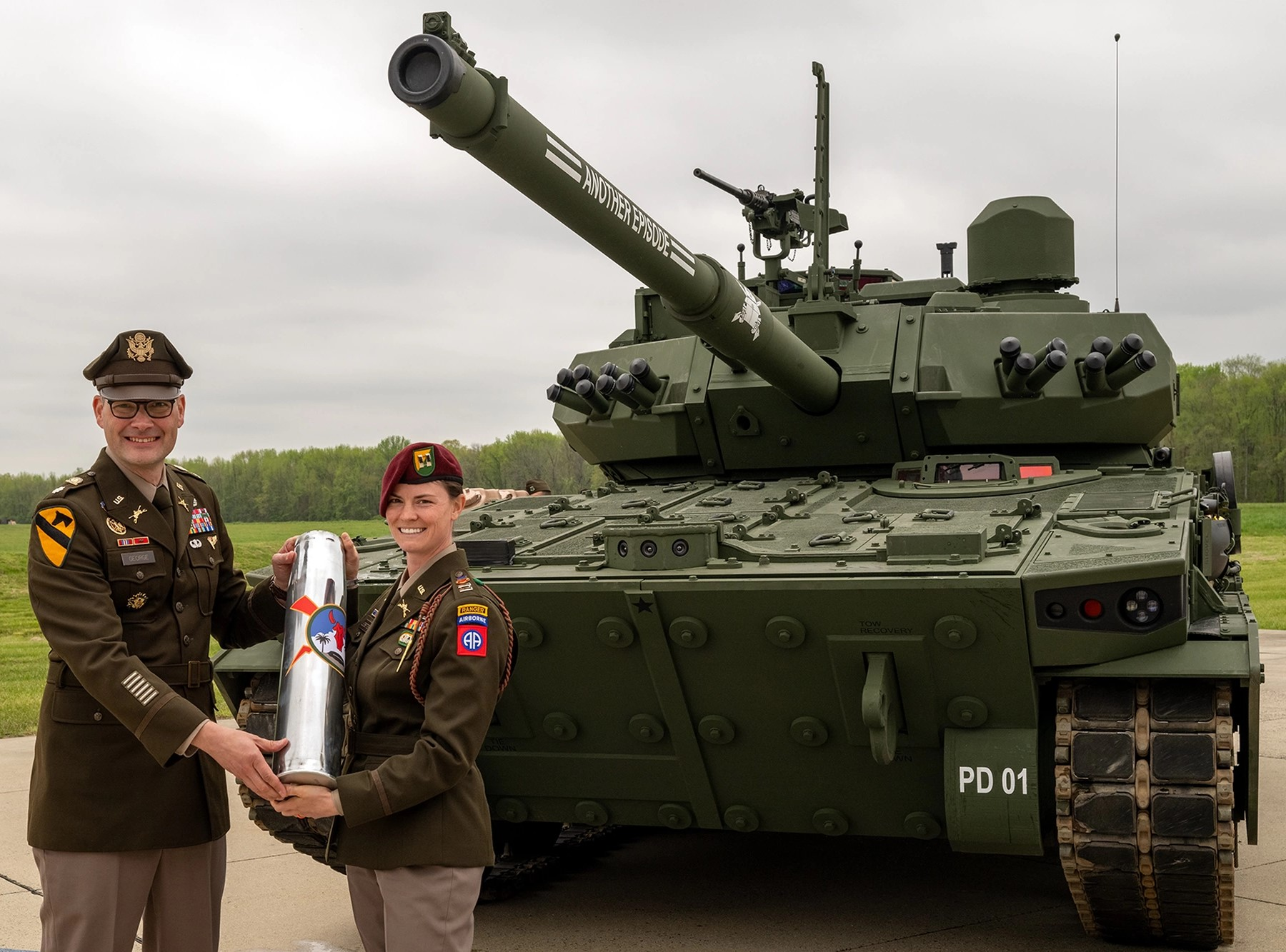
82nd Airborne Division's M10 Test Detachment Commander, receives ceremonial shell casing at the M10 Booker Dedication Ceremony, April 2024

Currently, the 82nd Airborne Division's M10 Booker Test Detachment has adopted the heraldry of the 73rd Armor Regiment, as highlighted in the US Army's M10 Booker Dedication Ceremony in April 2024

== Coat of Arms ==
=== Blazon ===
- Shield: Per fess Azure and Gules, on a fess Or a hand in armor grasping a bolt of lightning, both Vert.
- Crest: On a wreath of the colors Or and Azure, issuing from a flame of six tongues, three to dexter and three to sinister, charged with an arrowhead Argent within a crescent Vert, the head of a mace formed by a Korean Taeguk.
- Motto: "Honor, Fidelity, Courage".

=== Symbolism ===
The shield is divided red and blue per fess, with a fess of gold thereon, which are the three colors of the shoulder sleeve insignia of the armored tank forces. The lightning bolt is symbolical of the striking power of the organization.

The six tongues of the flames in the crest represent the unit's six decorations. The crescent and arrowhead symbolize the Algeria-French Morocco and southern France assaults, World War II, and the colors red and green are used to represent the French Croix de Guerre awarded for the Italian campaigns. The mace in the arms of Colmar suggested the mace head to refer to the Colmar campaign. The Taeguk represents the Korean War and the three Republic of Korea Presidential Unit Citations from that nation. The mace also alludes to the striking power of armor.

The coat of arms was originally approved for the 756th Tank Battalion, Light on 15 May 1942. It was redesignated for the 756th Tank Battalion on 22 November 1943. The insignia was redesignated for the 73d Tank Battalion on 23 October 1953. It was redesignated for the 73d Armor on 19 March 1963. It was amended to add the crest on 15 December 1965. It was redesignated effective 25 February 2004, for the 73d Cavalry Regiment.

== Notable soldiers ==
=== Medals of Honor ===
- 2LT Raymond Zussman, A Co, 756th Tank Battalion, September 12, 1944
- 2LT James L. Harris, A Co, 756th Tank Battalion, October 7, 1944

=== Other ===
- Clint Lorance, former US Army first lieutenant convicted of 2012 second-degree murder for two battlefield killings in Afghanistan; sentenced to 20 years imprisonment; incarcerated at Fort Leavenworth; pardoned by Donald Trump and released after six years.
- William Gainey, first Senior Enlisted Advisor to the Chairman (SEAC). SEAC Gainey conducted a combat parachute jump with 3-73 Armor during Operation Just Cause into Panama in 1989.
- John W. Troxell, also a former Senior Enlisted Advisor to the Chairman who completed a combat parachute jump with 3-73 Armor during Operation Just Cause.

== See also ==
- United States Army branch insignia
- List of armored and cavalry regiments of the United States Army
- Field Artillery Branch (United States)
