= Jones International University =

Online for-profit university in Colorado, US

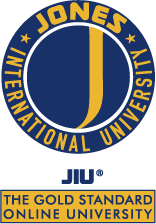
- Type: Private online for-profit university
- Active: 1993–2015
- Founder: Glenn R. Jones
- Location: Centennial, Colorado, United States
- Campus: Online

Jones International University (JIU) was a private online for-profit university headquartered in Centennial, Colorado. It was accredited by the Higher Learning Commission.

== History ==
In 1987 Glenn R. Jones launched the cable television network Mind Extension University (ME/U, later Knowledge TV), which enabled 30,000 students to take courses from more than 30 colleges and universities via television. In 1993, Jones started JIU, claiming to be the first university anywhere to exist completely online.

In 1999, JIU became the first fully online university in the U.S. to be accredited by the Higher Learning Commission, and a member of the North Central Association. This decision caused outrage from the American Association of University Professors on the grounds that the teaching staff had no academic freedom, and that an institution that taught only one subject could not claim to be a university. JIU offered bachelors, masters, and doctoral degree programs in business and masters and doctoral degree programs in education according to its website.

On March 31, 2015 the school announced it would be closing its doors. Students who did not graduate in the Class of 2015 were offered teach-out transfer to Trident University International.

== Accreditation ==
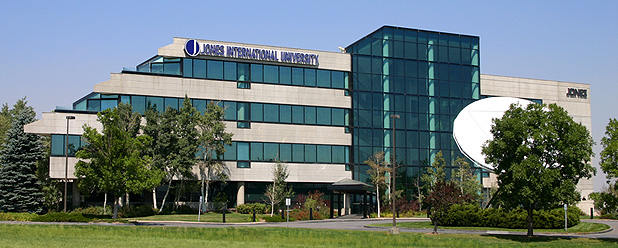
Jones International University headquarters in Centennial, Colorado.

JIU was accredited by the Higher Learning Commission (HLC), a member of the North Central Association, one of six regional accrediting bodies in the United States. In 2011, the Higher Learning Commission placed the university "On Notice." In 2013, the commission removed the university from this status.

== Notable alumni ==
- Jayson Blair, reporter
- Marcus Gaither, American-French basketball player
