= Glenn R. Jones =

Glenn R. Jones (March 2, 1930 – July 7, 2015) was a cable news executive from Colorado. Jones went to Allegheny College and served in the United States Navy, before receiving a law degree from the University of Colorado in 1961. Jones ran as a Republican for Colorado's 1st congressional district in 1964 but was defeated by incumbent Democrat Byron G. Rogers with a 67.52%–31.90% margin. Beginning in 1967, he grew a small cable television empire, becoming, at one point, the tenth largest provider in the nation, with his company Jones/NCTI, Inc. His main innovations were using television to educate, first in 1987 with Mind Extension University, later renamed Knowledge TV, followed in 1993 with the internet's first accredited online college, Jones International University (JIU). The for-profit college was put on notice by its accreditor in 2011, and closed in 2015, the year of Jones' death. A teach-out agreement was made whereby JIU students transferred to Trident University International to complete their degrees; additionally, Trident named its business school the Glenn R. Jones College of Business.

Jones' interest in digital access to information led to his work in helping create both the United States' National Digital Library Program, and the World Digital Library, run by the Library of Congress and UNESCO. In 2015, before the program was disbanded, Jones was honored as a Library of Congress Living Legend. Previously Jones held a further connection to the Library as a member of the James Madison Council.
