= Knowledge TV =

- Country: United States
- Headquarters: Centennial, CO

Programming
- Language: English

Ownership
- Owner: Jones International/Jones Media Group
- Key people: Glenn R. Jones

History
- Launched: November 15, 1987
- Closed: 2000
- Former names: Mind Extension University

Knowledge TV was a cable television channel owned by Jones Media Group that broadcast educational programming. The network was established on November 15, 1987 as Mind Extension University. At launch it partnered with Colorado State University and Annenberg Foundation. The network was openly broadcast, and students were charged tuition to obtain credit for the course. Students submitted homework and contacted instructors via telephone. The following year, Washington State University, the University of Minnesota, Oklahoma State University, and SUNY/Empire State College also signed on. Eventually, 30 colleges and universities partnered with Mind Extension. Students submitted papers and assignments either by mail or fax. In 1993, Jones Media Group CEO Glenn R. Jones founded Jones International University (JIU) as a new all-online university. JIU achieved regional accreditation in 1999 but closed in 2015.

In late 1996, the network was renamed Knowledge TV, and by that time, it carried several programs dealing with new media and Silicon Valley businesses, including New Media News from KRON-TV in San Francisco, and many computer education programs such as Stewart Cheifet's Computer Chronicles. The network reached about 25 million subscribers, although many cable systems only carried the network part-time, using it to fill downtime on public access networks and late night paid programming blocks on networks such as Discovery Channel.

In 1999, Discovery Communications bought out Knowledge TV and it was closed in 2000, as Discovery planned to give cable operators the option of converting the channel to Discovery Health.
