= James L. Harris =

- Born: June 27, 1916; Hillsboro, Texas, US
- Died: October 7, 1944 (aged 28); Vagney, France
- Burial place: Ridge Park Cemetery Hillsboro, Texas
- Military career
- Allegiance: United States
- Branch: United States Army
- Service years: 1941 – 1944
- Rank: Second Lieutenant
- Unit: 756th Tank Battalion
- Conflicts: World War II
- Awards: Medal of Honor

James Lindell Harris (June 27, 1916 – October 7, 1944) was a United States Army officer and a recipient of the United States military's highest decoration—the Medal of Honor—for his actions in World War II.

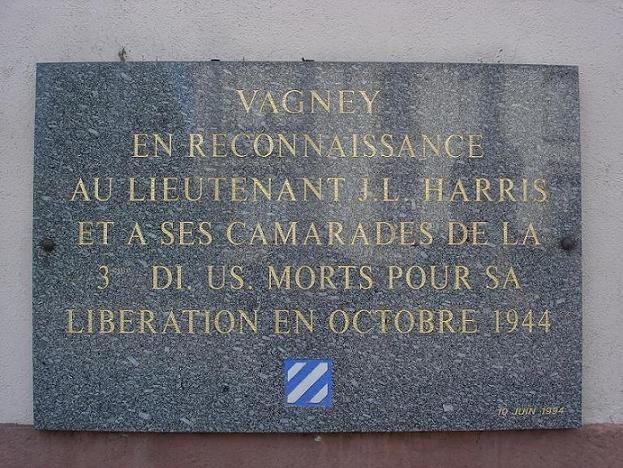
Plaque commémorative apposée par la mairie de Vagney (Vosges - France) afin de rendre hommage au lieutenant J. L. Harris et à ses camarades de la 3e DI US morts pour la libération de Vagney en octobre 1944

== Biography ==
Harris was drafted into Army from his birthplace of Hillsboro, Texas in March 1941, eventually receiving a battlefield commission in March 1944. By October 7, 1944 was serving as a second lieutenant in the 756th Tank Battalion. On that day, at Vagney, France, he commanded an M4 Sherman tank in a hunt for an enemy raiding party which had infiltrated Allied lines. After moving ahead of his tank on foot to search for the enemy, he was seriously wounded by hostile fire. He managed to crawl back to his tank and continued to lead his crew, but was again severely wounded in the ensuing firefight. He refused medical attention until another wounded man had been evacuated, and subsequently died of his injuries. For these actions, Harris was posthumously awarded the Medal of Honor six months later, on April 23, 1945.

Harris, aged 28 at his death, was buried at Ridge Park Cemetery in his hometown of Hillsboro, Texas.

== Medal of Honor citation ==
Second Lieutenant Harris' official Medal of Honor citation reads:

For conspicuous gallantry and intrepidity at risk of life above and beyond the call of duty on 7 October 1944, in Vagney, France. At 9 p.m. an enemy raiding party, comprising a tank and 2 platoons of infantry, infiltrated through the lines under cover of mist and darkness and attacked an infantry battalion command post with hand grenades, retiring a short distance to an ambush position on hearing the approach of the M-4 tank commanded by 2d Lt. Harris. Realizing the need for bold aggressive action, 2d Lt. Harris ordered his tank to halt while he proceeded on foot, fully 10 yards ahead of his 6-man patrol and armed only with a service pistol, to probe the darkness for the enemy. Although struck down and mortally wounded by machinegun bullets which penetrated his solar plexus, he crawled back to his tank, leaving a trail of blood behind him, and, too weak to climb inside it, issued fire orders while lying on the road between the 2 contending armored vehicles. Although the tank which he commanded was destroyed in the course of the fire fight, he stood the enemy off until friendly tanks, preparing to come to his aid, caused the enemy to withdraw and thereby lose an opportunity to kill or capture the entire battalion command personnel. Suffering a second wound, which severed his leg at the hip, in the course of this tank duel, 2d Lt. Harris refused aid until after a wounded member of his crew had been carried to safety. He died before he could be given medical attention.

== Awards and decorations ==

1st row	Medal of Honor	Purple Heart	American Defense Service Medal
2nd row	American Campaign Medal	European–African–Middle Eastern Campaign Medal with 1 campaign star	World War II Victory Medal

== See also ==
- List of Medal of Honor recipients
- List of Medal of Honor recipients for World War II
