= Troy Black =

United States Marine (born 1969)

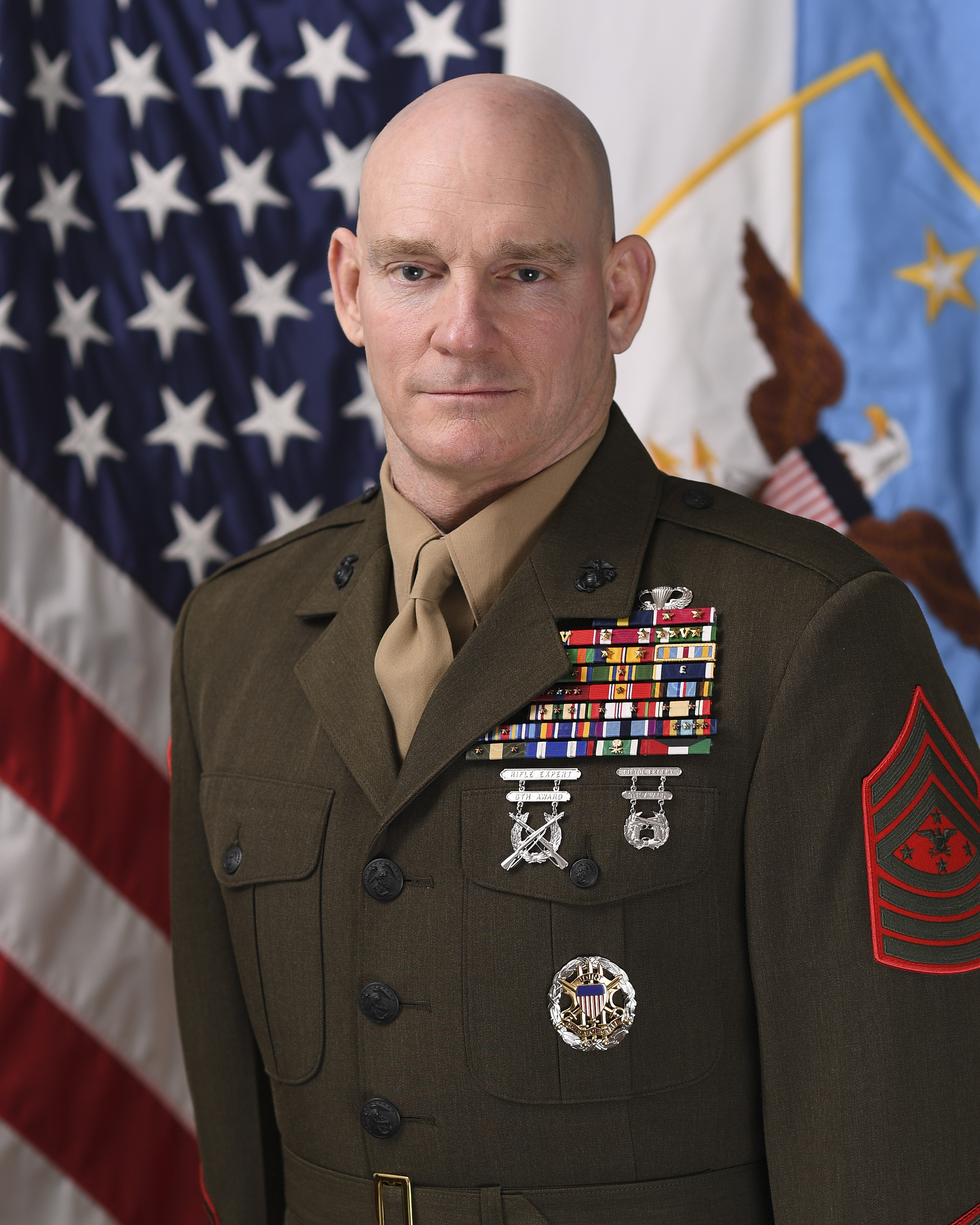
- Black in 2023
- Born: 21 April 1969 (age 57); Louisville, Kentucky, U.S.
- Military career
- Allegiance: United States
- Branch: United States Marine Corps
- Service years: 1988–2025
- Rank: Senior Enlisted Advisor to the Chairman
- Conflicts: Gulf War; Iraq War; War in Afghanistan
- Awards: Defense Distinguished Service Medal; Navy Distinguished Service Medal; Legion of Merit (3); Bronze Star Medal with Combat Distinguishing Device
- Troy E. Black's voice Black's opening statement at a House Armed Services Military Personnel Subcommittee hearing on the state of enlisted personnel Recorded March 9, 2023

Troy E. Black (born April 21, 1969) is a retired staff non-commissioned officer of the United States Marine Corps and served as the 5th Senior Enlisted Advisor to the Chairman (SEAC) from November 3, 2023, to June 20, 2025. In his role as SEAC, Black was the most senior enlisted member of the United States military. He previously served as the 19th Sergeant Major of the Marine Corps from July 26, 2019, to August 10, 2023.

== Early life ==
Black is a native of Louisville, Kentucky, and a 1987 graduate of Jeffersontown High School.

Black is married to Stacie, and they have four children.

== Military career ==
Black entered U.S. Marine recruit training at Marine Corps Recruit Depot Parris Island in April 1988, graduating in July 1988. In October 1988, he graduated from the United States Marine Corps School of Infantry at Camp Geiger in North Carolina and received the military occupational specialty of 0331-Machine Gunner.

In December 1988, Black graduated the Marine Security Force School and was posted to the Marine Detachment aboard the USS Forrestal (CV-59) that deployed in 1989 in support of Operation Just Cause and to the Mediterranean. From September 1990 to 1993 he was posted to the 3rd Battalion, 5th Marines, serving in successive capacities of gunner, team leader, section leader, platoon sergeant, and platoon commander. In December 1990, Black deployed with the 3rd Battalion, 5th Marines to Kuwait in support of Operation Desert Shield and later Operation Desert Storm. In 1993, he completed the U.S. Army Basic Airborne Course at the U.S. Army Airborne School.

Between 1994 and 1997, Black served at Marine Corps Recruit Depot Parris Island as a drill instructor and then a senior drill instructor. From 1997 to 2000, he was assigned to a Fleet Anti-Terrorism Security Team, serving as a platoon sergeant, operations chief, and then a platoon commander. In 2000, Black returned to Marine Corps Recruit Depot Parris Island, where over the next three years he served as a senior drill instructor, Drill Instructor School instructor, and Recruit Training Regiment drill master.

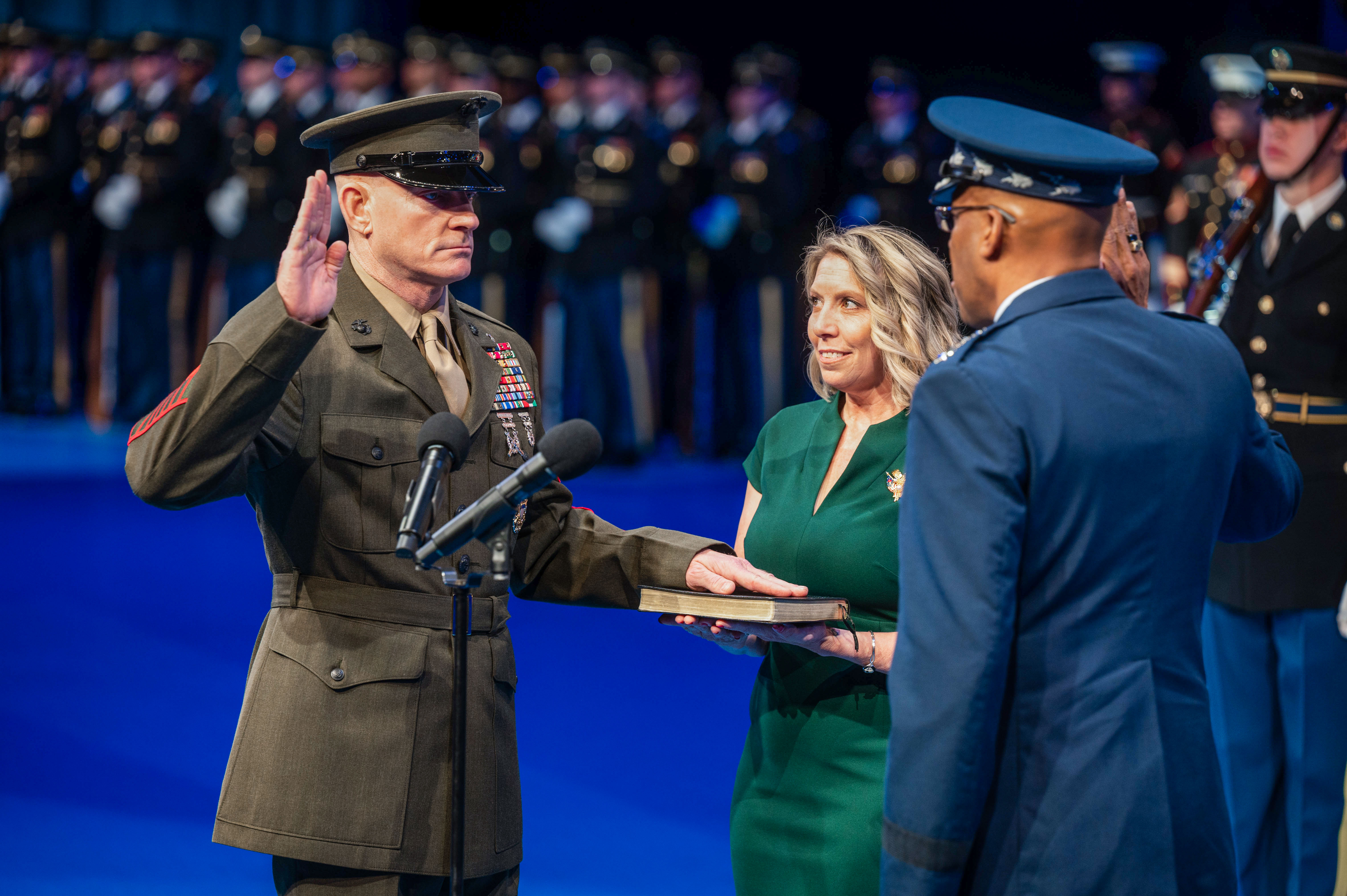
Black is sworn in as the 5th SEAC on November 3, 2023.

Between 2003 and 2006, he served in the 2nd Battalion, 1st Marines as a company gunnery sergeant and then as a first sergeant, deploying twice to Iraq as part of Operation Iraqi Freedom. Between 2006 and 2007, Black served as a company first sergeant in the 3rd Assault Amphibian Battalion. From 2007 to 2009, he served as a sergeant major at Officer Candidates School. Black served as the sergeant major of the 3rd Battalion, 7th Marines from 2009 to 2011, deploying twice to Afghanistan as part of Operation Enduring Freedom.

In 2010, he was awarded the Bronze Star Medal with Combat "V" for running through uncleared territory to rescue a fallen comrade hit by an improvised explosive device. From 2011 to 2013, Black served as the sergeant major of Combat Logistics Battalion 5. He served as the sergeant major of the 11th Marine Expeditionary Unit from 2013 to 2015. Following that, Black served as the sergeant major of the 1st Marine Logistics Group from 2015 to 2017. He was named Sergeant Major of Manpower and Reserve Affairs in 2017. On April 25, 2019, Black was named the 19th Sergeant Major of the Marine Corps and assumed the post on July 26, 2019.

In July 2023, Black was selected to serve as the fifth senior enlisted advisor to the chairman of the Joint Chiefs of Staff. He assumed office on November 3, 2023. In April 2025, newly appointed CJCS General Dan Caine chose not to renew Black's posting for another two years. Black completed a single two-year term and retired on June 20, 2025.

== Awards and decorations ==
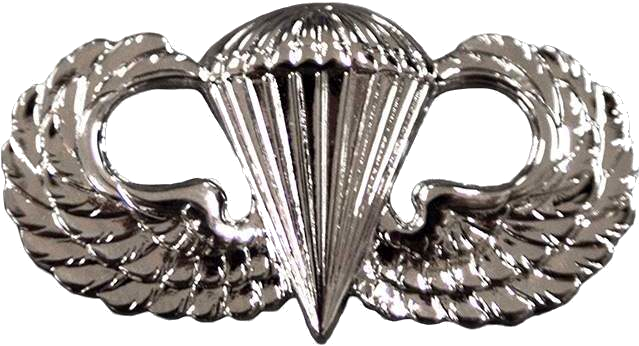

Basic Parachutist Insignia
Defense Distinguished Service Medal		Navy Distinguished Service Medal	
Legion of Merit with two gold award stars	Bronze Star w/ 1 award star & Combat V	Meritorious Service Medal w/ 2 award stars	Navy and Marine Corps Commendation Medal w/ valor device & 3 award stars
Navy and Marine Corps Achievement Medal w/ 1 award star	Combat Action Ribbon w/ 2 award stars	Joint Meritorious Unit Award	Navy Unit Commendation w/ 3 bronze service stars
Navy Meritorious Unit Commendation w/ 1 service star	Navy E Ribbon	Marine Corps Good Conduct Medal w/ 9 service stars	National Defense Service Medal w/ 1 service star
Armed Forces Expeditionary Medal	Southwest Asia Service Medal w/ 3 campaign stars	Afghanistan Campaign Medal w/ 2 campaign stars	Iraq Campaign Medal w/ 2 campaign stars
Global War on Terrorism Expeditionary Medal w/ 1 service star	Global War on Terrorism Service Medal	Humanitarian Service Medal	Navy Sea Service Deployment Ribbon w/ 8 service stars
Marine Corps Drill Instructor Ribbon w/ 2 service stars	NATO Medal for Service with ISAF	Kuwait Liberation Medal (Saudi Arabia)	Kuwait Liberation Medal (Kuwait)
Rifle Expert Badge (6th Award)		Pistol Expert Badge (9th Award)	
Joint Chiefs of Staff Identification Badge

- 8 service stripes.

Military offices
Preceded by Ronald L. Green	Sergeant Major of the Marine Corps; 2019–2023	Succeeded by Carlos A. Ruiz
Preceded by Ramón Colón-López	Senior Enlisted Advisor to the Chairman; 2023–2025	Succeeded by David L. Isom
