= Bryan B. Battaglia =

2nd Senior Enlisted Advisor to the Chairman

Bryan Battaglia
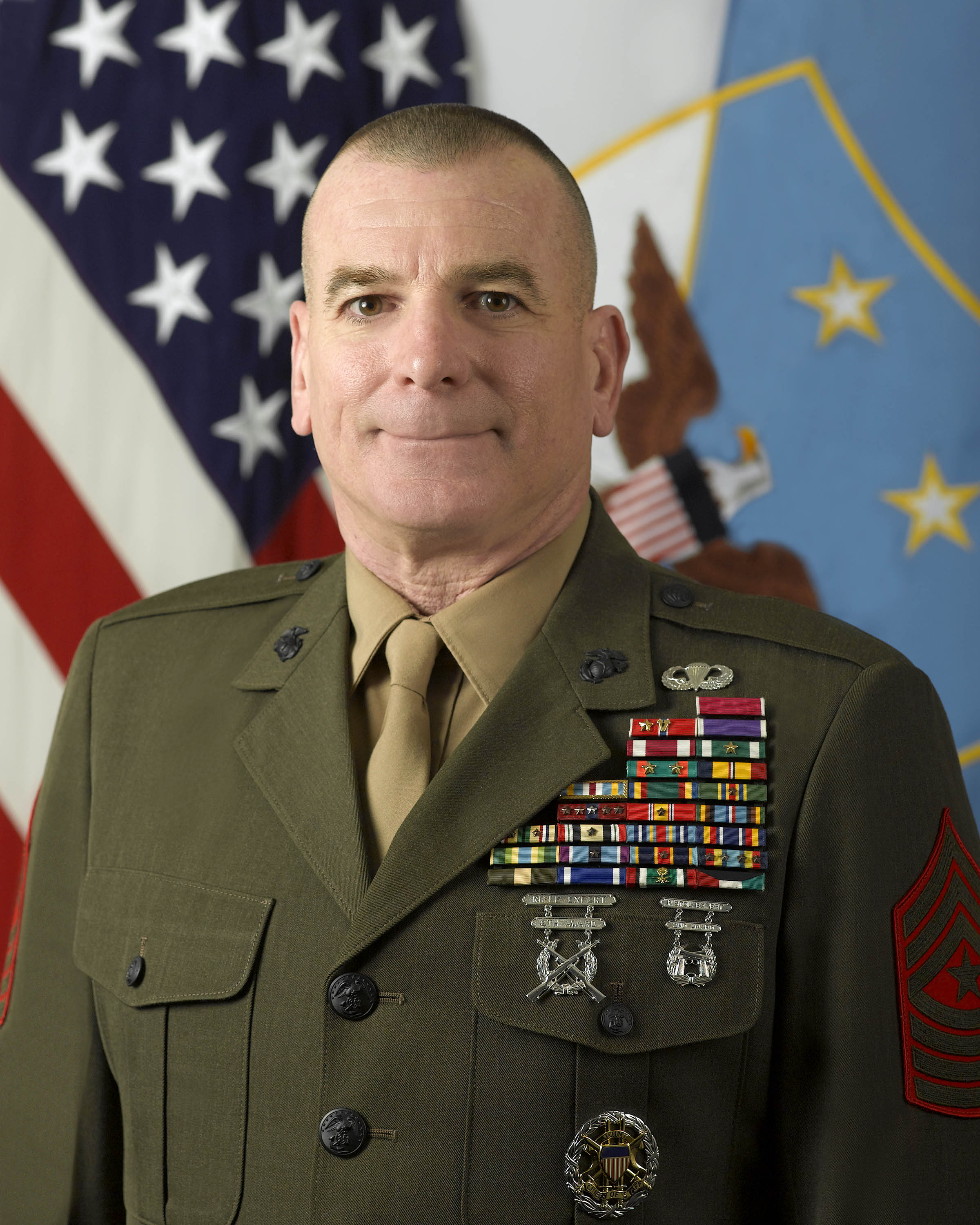
- Born: April 6, 1961 (age 65); Metairie, Louisiana, U.S.
- Military career
- Allegiance: United States
- Branch: United States Marine Corps
- Service years: 1979–2016
- Rank: Senior Enlisted Advisor to the Chairman
- Conflicts: Gulf War; Iraq War
- Awards: Defense Superior Service Medal; Legion of Merit; Bronze Star Medal (2 w/Valor); Purple Heart; Meritorious Service Medal; Navy and Marine Corps Commendation Medal (2); Navy and Marine Corps Achievement Medal (3)

Bryan B. Battaglia (born April 6, 1961) is a retired United States Marine who served as Senior Enlisted Advisor to the Chairman of the Joint Chiefs of Staff, sworn into office on 30 September 2011. He held this position until December 11, 2015.

== Early life ==
Battaglia was born in Metairie, Louisiana, on April 6, 1961. He attended St. Catherine of Sienna School, Archbishop Rummel and East Jefferson High School. Following school, he joined the Marine Corps in September 17, 1979. Completing boot camp and Infantry Training School Battaglia served his first tour as a Security Guard at Marine Barracks London, Det II Royal Air Force Base, St. Mawgan, England.

== Military career ==
An Infantryman, he was meritoriously promoted to Corporal in November 1981. Battaglia was transferred to Company I, 3rd Battalion, 6th Marines as an infantry fire team leader. Completing Squad Leaders School, Water Survival Instructor School and Nuclear, Biological and Chemical Defense School, he was reassigned as a squad leader. Meritoriously promoted to Sergeant on October 2, 1982, he relocated to Weapons Platoon as the 60mm mortar section leader. Completing various deployments, in February 1984, he was transferred to Parris Island, South Carolina, for Drill Instructor duty with Company I, 3rd Recruit Training Battalion. He also served as a Rappel Master, Swim Instructor.

In June 1986, Battaglia returned to Company K, 3rd Battalion, 6th Marines, as Platoon Sergeant, completing various Landing Force 6th Fleet and Unit Deployments and in October 1987, attended the Senior Non-commissioned Officer Career Course, served as the Regimental Career Planner for the 2d Marine Regiment.

In January 1990, Battaglia deployed to Norway followed by an August 1990 deployment to Southwest Asia. Combat meritoriously promoted to Gunnery Sergeant on December 2, 1990 and upon return from the Gulf War in April 1991. He then completed the SNCO Advanced Course, Airborne Parachutist School at Ft. Benning, while serving as Regimental company gunnery sergeant. In March 1993, he transferred to the United Kingdom to the British Royal Marine Exchange Program. He graduated 3rd in his class in the Royal Marines Commando Course earning the coveted Green Beret and served a 2 year assignment at Royal Marines in Lympstone, England.

In July 1995, Battaglia was transferred to 2d Force Service Support Group for duty with Headquarters Battalion and in October 1996, he deployed with 1st Battalion, 6th Marines to Guantanamo Bay, Cuba in support of Joint Task Force 160. Returning during December 1995, he was reassigned as the First Sergeant, Marine Expeditionary Unit Service Support Group 26 from April 1996 to July 1998 and deployed to Bosnia and Herzegovina supporting Operation Dynamic Response.

Promoted to Sergeant Major, Battaglia transferred to 2d Marine Aircraft Wing and was assigned to Marine Aerial Refueler Transport Squadron 252. In September 2001, he assumed duties as Battalion Sergeant Major, Weapons Training Battalion, Quantico, Virginia, and the following year was further assigned to Marine Barracks, Washington, D.C. as the Barracks Sergeant Major from 2002 to 2004. He was later ordered to 2nd Marine Division and served as the Sergeant Major 8th Marines and Regimental Combat Team 8 during Operation Iraqi Freedom from November 2004 to May 2006.

On June 9, 2006 Battaglia assumed his duties as Sergeant Major, 2d Marine Division and Multi-National Force West-Iraq, from February 2007 to February 2008. During March 2008, he was transferred to Norfolk, Virginia, where he assumed duties as the Command Senior Enlisted Leader, United States Joint Forces Command, from April 2008 to August 2011. In this post he served under Generals James Mattis and Ray Odierno.

The 2nd SEAC to be appointed as Senior Enlisted Advisor to the Chairman of the Joint Chiefs, https://www.jcs.mil/About/The-Joint-Staff/Senior-Enlisted-Advisor/ from 1 Oct 2011 through Dec 2015, Battaglia served as the most senior ranking non-commissioned officer of the United States Armed Forces and principal military advisor to the Chairman of the Joint Chiefs of Staff, Generals Martin Dempsey and Joseph Dunford, and to Secretaries of Defense Leon Panetta, Chuck Hagel, and Ashton Carter on all matters involving the joint and combined total force integration, utilization, health of the force and joint development for enlisted personnel and families.

He holds a Bachelor of Science in Liberal Arts concentrated in Psychology and Business Management. Battaglia was honorably retired from the United States Marines on 31 August 2016, having served nearly 37 years of active duty service.

== Awards and decorations ==
Battaglia has been awarded the following decorations:

Basic Parachutist Insignia
	Defense Superior Service Medal	Legion of Merit	
Bronze Star Medal w/ 1 award star & Combat V	Purple Heart	Meritorious Service Medal	Navy and Marine Corps Commendation Medal w/ gold award star
Navy and Marine Corps Achievement Medal w/ 2 award stars	Combat Action Ribbon	Joint Meritorious Unit Award	Navy Unit Commendation
Navy Meritorious Unit Commendation w/ 1 service star	Marine Corps Good Conduct Medal w/ 11 service stars	National Defense Service Medal w/ 1 service star	Armed Forces Expeditionary Medal
Southwest Asia Service Medal w/ 2 service stars	Iraq Campaign Medal w/ 1 service star	Global War on Terrorism Expeditionary Medal	Global War on Terrorism Service Medal
Armed Forces Service Medal	Humanitarian Service Medal w/ 1 service star	Navy Sea Service Deployment Ribbon w/ 8 service stars	Navy and Marine Corps Overseas Service Ribbon w/ 1 service star
Marine Corps Drill Instructor Ribbon	NATO Medal for Service in ex-Yugoslavia	Kuwait Liberation Medal (Saudi Arabia)	Kuwait Liberation Medal (Kuwait)
Office of the Joint Chiefs of Staff Identification Badge

- 9 service stripes. He also holds expert marksmanship badges in rifle (8) and pistol (2).

Military offices
Preceded by William Gainey	Senior Enlisted Advisor to the Chairman; 2011–2015	Succeeded by John W. Troxell
