= David O'Donahue =

David O'Donahue is the Deputy Adjutant General-Civil Support of the Wisconsin National Guard with the rank of Brigadier General.

== Career ==
O'Donahue received his commission through the Reserve Officers' Training Corps in 1987. Commands he has held within the Wisconsin Army National Guard include the 157th Maneuver Enhancement Brigade. In addition, O'Donahue served two combat deployments during the Iraq War.

Awards he has received include the Legion of Merit, Bronze Star Medal with oak leaf cluster, Meritorious Service Medal with three oak leaf clusters and the Army Commendation Medal with four oak leaf clusters.

== Education ==
- Michigan Technological University
- Trident University International
- United States Army War College
