= Library of Congress Living Legend =

Library of Congress Living Legend was a designation bestowed by the United States Library of Congress to recognize creative contributions to American life. People were honored in specific categories that included "leaders and statesmen", "activists and reformers", "scientists and inventors", "writers and artists", "musicians and composers", "industrialists and entrepreneurs", and "athletes and entertainers". The program began in 2000. Librarian of Congress Carla Hayden retired the program in 2018.

== List of honorees ==
- Hank Aaron (died 2021)
- Madeleine Albright (died 2022)
- Muhammad Ali (died 2016)
- Mario Andretti
- Ernie Banks (died 2015)
- Harry Belafonte (died 2023)
- Tony Bennett (died 2023)
- James H. Billington (died 2018)
- Big Bird (original performer Caroll Spinney died 2019)
- Larry Bird
- Herblock (died 2001)
- Judy Blume
- Julian Bond (died 2015)
- T. Berry Brazelton (died 2018)
- Gwendolyn Brooks (died 2000)
- Dave Brubeck (died 2012)
- Kobe Bryant (died 2020)
- William F. Buckley, Jr. (died 2008)
- Carol Burnett
- Laura Bush
- Ben Carson
- Benny Carter (died 2003)
- Johnny Cash (died 2003)
- Vinton Cerf
- Ray Charles (died 2004)
- Linda Chavez
- Julia Child (died 2004)
- Beverly Cleary (died 2021)
- David Copperfield
- Bill Cosby
- Walter Cronkite (died 2009)
- Merce Cunningham (died 2009)
- Michael DeBakey (died 2008)
- Sylvia Earle
- Marian Wright Edelman
- Ahmet Ertegun (died 2006)
- Suzanne Farrell
- John Kenneth Galbraith (died 2006)
- Andrew Goodpaster (died 2005)
- Stephen Jay Gould (died 2002)
- Katharine Graham (died 2001)
- Archie Green (died 2009)
- Thomas Hampson
- Herbie Hancock
- Mickey Hart
- Al Hirschfeld (died 2003)
- Bob Hope (died 2003)
- Marta Casals Istomin
- Glenn R. Jones (died 2015)
- Quincy Jones (died 2024)
- Jenette Kahn
- Max Kampelman (died 2013)
- George Kennan (died 2005)
- Jackie Joyner Kersee
- B. B. King (died 2015)
- Billie Jean King
- Jeane Kirkpatrick (died 2006)
- John Kluge (died 2010)
- Ursula K. Le Guin (died 2018)
- Annie Leibovitz
- Miguel León-Portilla (died 2019)
- Carl Lewis
- John Lewis (died 2020)
- Mario Vargas Llosa (died 2025)
- Alan Lomax (died 2002)
- Yo-Yo Ma
- Robert McCloskey (died 2003)
- David McCullough (died 2022)
- Mark McGwire
- Rita Moreno
- Toni Morrison (died 2019)
- Odetta (died 2008)
- Gordon Parks (died 2006)
- Dolly Parton (died 2026)
- Katherine Paterson
- I. M. Pei (died 2019)
- Jaroslav Pelikan (died 2006)
- Itzhak Perlman
- Colin Powell (died 2021)
- Leontyne Price
- Tito Puente (died 2000)
- Sally K. Ride (died 2012)
- Cal Ripken
- Cokie Roberts (died 2019)
- Frank Robinson (died 2019)
- Fred Rogers (died 2003)
- Philip Roth (died 2018)
- Bob Schieffer
- Gunther Schuller (died 2015)
- Martin Scorsese
- Pete Seeger (died 2014)
- Maurice Sendak (died 2012)
- Bobby Short (died 2005)
- Stephen Sondheim (died 2021)
- Steven Spielberg
- Ralph Stanley (died 2016)
- Gloria Steinem (died 2026)
- Isaac Stern (died 2001)
- Barbra Streisand
- William Styron (died 2006)
- Harold Varmus
- Gwen Verdon (died 2000)
- Lew Wasserman (died 2002)
- Fred L. Whipple (died 2004)
- Joseph Wilson (died 2015)
- Tiger Woods
- Herman Wouk (died 2019)

== See also ==
- List of awards for contributions to culture
- List of medicine awards
