= 756th Tank Battalion (United States) =

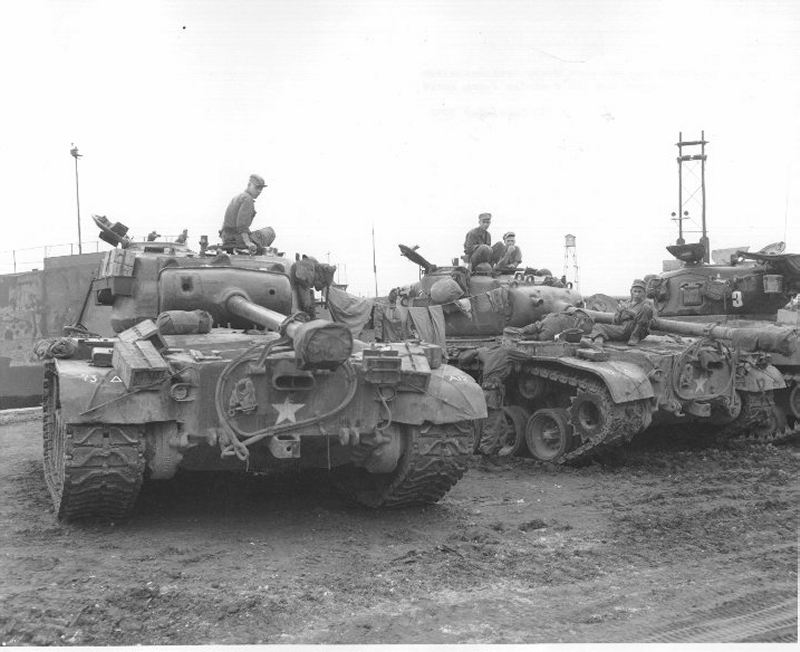
- Two M26 Pershings and one M4 Sherman of the 73rd Heavy Tank Battalion at Pusan Docks in South Korea during the Korean War.
- Active: 1941–49; 1949–96
- Country: United States
- Branch: United States Army
- Type: Armored
- Size: Battalion
- Part of: Independent unit
- Mottos: Honor, Fidelity, Courage
- Equipment: M4 Sherman, M26 Pershing (in Korea)
- Engagements: World War II: Allied invasion of Italy; Operation Dragoon; Colmar Pocket; Korean War

Insignia
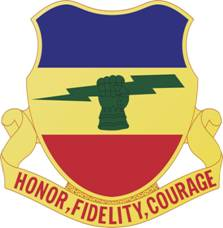
- Identification symbol

The 756th Tank Battalion was an independent tank battalion of the United States Army active during World War II and, as the 73rd Tank Battalion, during the early Cold War. It was later redesignated as the 73rd Armor Regiment, and is perpetuated today by the 73rd Cavalry Regiment.

== World War II ==
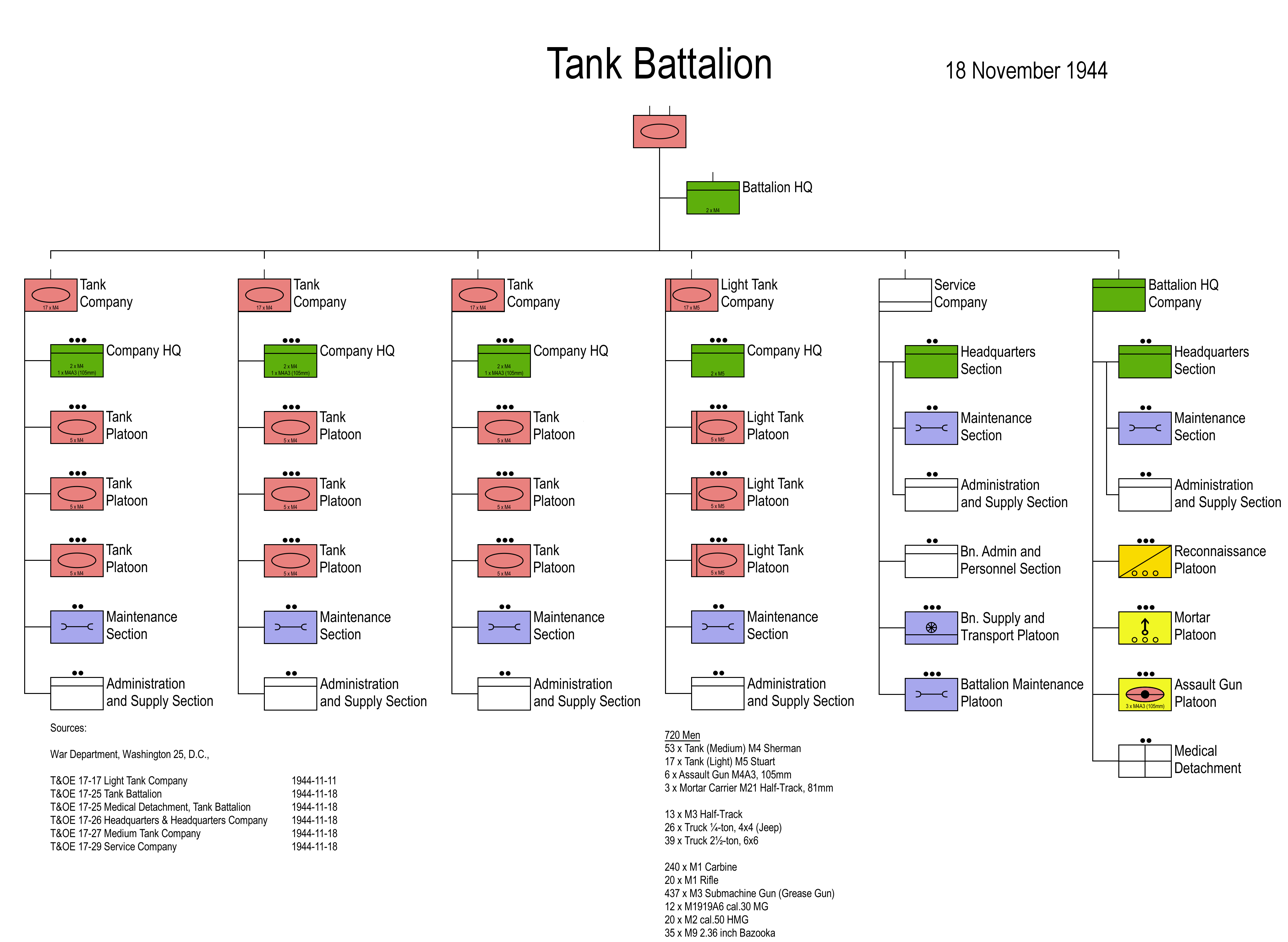
World War II tank battalion structure - November 1944

It was formed in 1941 as a light tank battalion, originally as the 76th Tank Battalion and renumbered in May. It first saw combat in 1943, when it deployed to North Africa on 24 January and then into Italy following the Salerno landings on 17 September.

In 1944, two companies of the battalion were re-equipped with DD tanks, specialised M4 Shermans designed for amphibious landings. On 15 August, it landed near St. Tropez as part of Operation Dragoon, attached to the 3rd Infantry Division, and pushed north through France along the Rhone Valley. The division went into defensive positions on the Rhine after reaching Strasbourg on 26 November, and saw heavy fighting early in 1945 during the clearing of the Colmar Pocket. It crossed the Rhine on 26 March, where its DD tanks were used as part of an amphibious assault, and then pushed into southern Germany with the 3rd Infantry. The battalion ended the war near Salzburg, in Austria.

Two officers of the battalion were awarded the Medal of Honor; Second Lieutenant Raymond Zussman and Second Lieutenant James L. Harris, both posthumously.

== Cold War ==
The battalion was briefly inactivated following World War II in 1946 before being reformed as a heavy tank battalion, and in 1949 was renumbered the 73rd Heavy Tank Battalion, under which name it served in the Korean War, with M4 Sherman and M26 Pershing tanks. It would later be redesignated the 73rd Armor Regiment and was finally disbanded in 1996.
