= Senior Enlisted Advisor to the Chairman =

Senior enlisted advisor to the Chairman of the Joint Chiefs of Staff

Senior Enlisted Advisor to the Chairman of the Joint Chiefs of Staff
- Flag of the Senior Enlisted Advisor

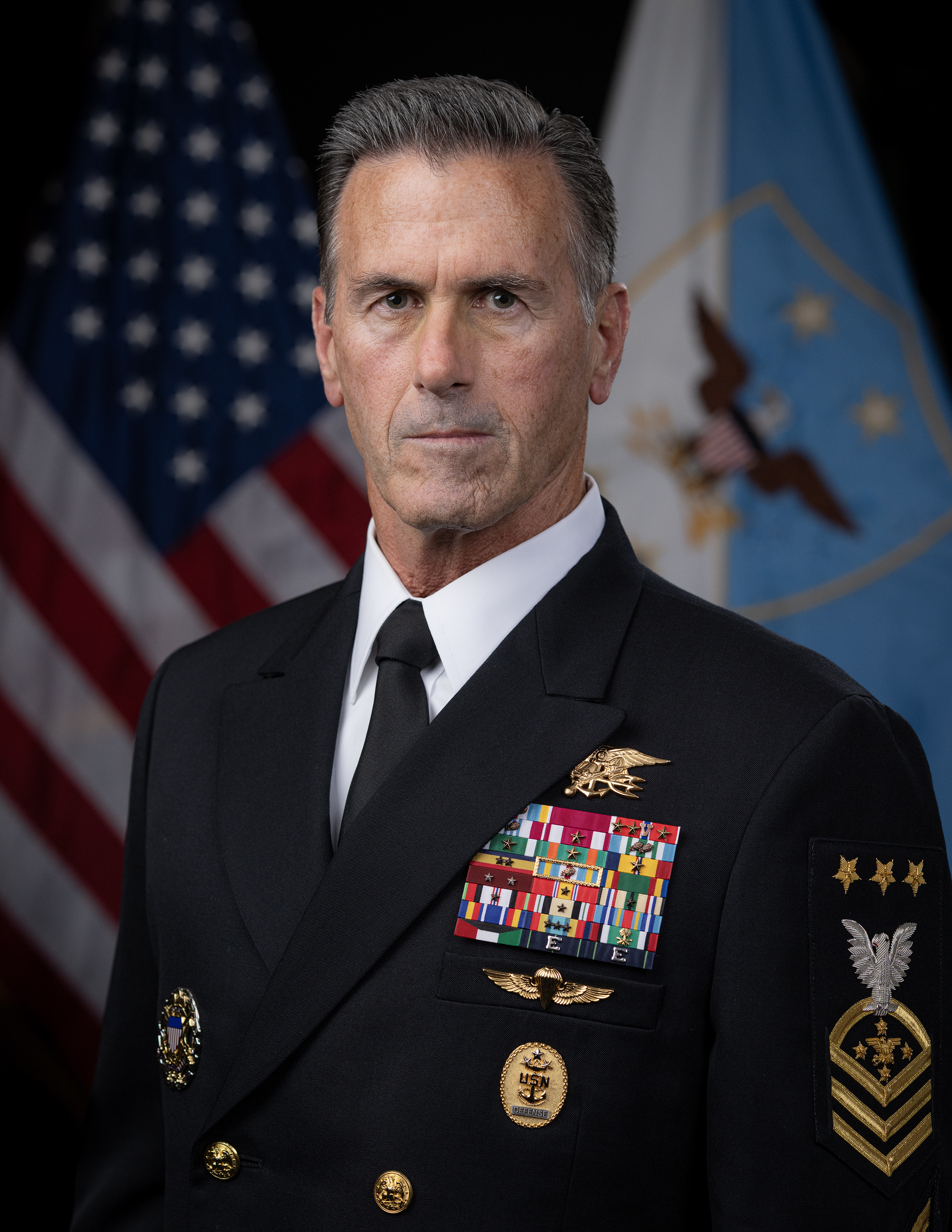
- Incumbent; SEAC David Isom, USN since 20 June 2025
- Joint Chiefs of Staff
- Type: Advisor
- Abbreviation: SEAC
- Member of: Joint Chiefs of Staff
- Reports to: Chairman of the Joint Chiefs of Staff
- Appointer: Chairman of the Joint Chiefs of Staff
- Term length: 2 years Renewable once for a total of 4 years.
- Formation: 1 October 2005
- First holder: CSM William Gainey
- Salary: $11,166.90 per month regardless of the incumbent's service longevity
- Website: Official Website

The senior enlisted advisor to the chairman of the Joint Chiefs of Staff (SEAC /ˈsiːæk/) is the most senior enlisted position in the United States Armed Forces and is a unique enlisted rank which only one individual may hold at any given time. The SEAC is appointed by the chairman of the Joint Chiefs of Staff to serve as a spokesperson to address the issues of enlisted personnel to the highest positions in the Department of Defense. As such, the SEAC is the primary enlisted advisor to the chairman, and serves at the pleasure of the secretary of defense. The SEAC's exact duties vary, depending on the chairman, though the SEAC generally devotes much of their time traveling throughout the Department of Defense, to observe training and communicating to service members and their families. The SEAC serves a two-year term, but may be reappointed by the chairman to serve an additional term for a total of four years. The first member to hold this post was William Gainey (appointed on 1 October 2005). The current SEAC is David Isom, USN who assumed duties on 20 June 2025.

Originally solely a position to which a senior NCO could be appointed, it evolved into a unique position and rank, with each service gradually introducing a unique rank insignia (excluding the United States Coast Guard) to be utilized when a service member from their branch serves as SEAC. As of September 2026, a SEAC has been selected from each branch except the United States Space Force. Enlisted coast guardsmen of the United States Coast Guard are not eligible to be selected as SEAC, as their service does not fall under the Department of Defense.

== History ==
=== Service senior enlisted advisors ===
Although Army and Marine headquarters from battalions and regiments, up to divisions, to corps, army headquarters and higher, have traditionally each had a sergeant major; and Navy and Coast Guard vessels have traditionally each had a command master chief or chief of the boat; the services' national headquarters generally had no counterpart position. The Marine Corps was the exception, having a sergeant major from 1801 until 1946, and a sergeant major of the Marine Corps from 23 May 1957 onwards, as the senior enlisted advisor to the commandant of the Marine Corps.

The other services followed during the Vietnam War, creating the counterpart positions of sergeant major of the Army in 1966, master chief petty officer of the Navy and chief master sergeant of the Air Force in 1967, and master chief petty officer of the Coast Guard in 1969. The National Guard established its own equivalent position, senior enlisted advisor to the chief of the National Guard Bureau, in 2003. The chief master sergeant of the Space Force was established in 2020. The positions are generically or collectively referred to as "senior enlisted advisors" ("SEAs"). Only one soldier, sailor, marine, airman, guardian, or coast guardsmen can hold that rank at any one time; moreover, the position's singularity is not deemed to prevent the technical overlap of a few weeks while a recently "retired" SEA remains legally on active duty for the duration of his accrued back-leave, known as "transitional leave"). Each advises his or her service chief (chief of staff of the Army, commandant of the Marine Corps, chief of naval operations, chief of staff of the Air Force, chief of space operations, and commandant of the Coast Guard) and other senior service leaders on all enlisted matters, makes decisions affecting enlisted personnel and their families, and is often invited to testify before Congress.

=== Creation and history ===
The position of senior enlisted advisor to the chairman was created in 2005 under General Peter Pace. The newly created position was established to advise the chairman on all matters involving enlisted personnel in a joint environment. General Peter Pace selected Army Command Sergeant Major William Gainey to serve as the first senior enlisted advisor to the chairman ("SEAC"), beginning 1 October 2005. Gainey had more than 30 years of active-duty experience including an extensive background in joint operations. He had most recently served as the command sergeant major of III Corps and Fort Hood, Texas, from 9 May 2003 until 30 September 2005. He served as senior enlisted advisor to the chairman until he retired on 25 April 2008.

When Admiral Michael Mullen became chairman of the Joint Chiefs of Staff, he consulted the SEAs of the services and opted not to appoint a SEA in his own office. Mullen concluded that the service SEAs were the best suited to address issues by while being among the troops, rather than having one serve on the Joint Staff. The position was reinstated in 2011 by Mullen's successor, General Martin Dempsey.

General Dempsey selected United States Marine Corps Sergeant Major Bryan B. Battaglia to serve as the 2nd senior enlisted advisor to the chairman of the Joint Chiefs of Staff. He took his post on 1 October 2011. Battaglia had more than 36 years of service at all levels including multiple combat deployments and senior enlisted assignments. He served as senior enlisted advisor to the chairman until 11 December 2015.

General Joseph Dunford selected United States Army CSM John W. Troxell to serve as the 3rd senior enlisted advisor to the chairman. Troxell took his post on 11 December 2015, and served until 13 December 2019. By the end of Troxell's term, each service began developing their own insignia for the SEAC, with the Army being the first to establish their version.

== Roles and responsibilities ==
The SEAC has oversight in any area that the chairman assigns him. The SEAC is the spokesman of the chairman to all services' SEAs. The SEAC, in some cases, is the spokesman for all enlisted members of the services and combatant commands during meetings with leaders from the services, civilian community, and service leaders of other nations. The SEAC is not in the direct chain of command of the services' nor combatant commands' SEAs; however, he is in the NCO communication chain. The SEAC is the Chairman's link to and/or from the services' and combatant commands' SEAs. During visits to areas of operation, the SEAC identifies issues and problems that might affect the services as a whole. When a problem is identified, he works with the services to find a common solution and help integrate, if possible, the solution into all of the services. Recently, combatant commands, which are joint duty and contain enlisted members from various services, have created Senior Enlisted Advisor (SEA) positions.

- The SEAC is an advisor to the chairman on all matters concerning joint and combined total force integration, utilization, and development. Additionally, the SEAC helps develop NCO-related joint professional education, enhance utilization of senior NCOs on joint battle staffs, and support the chairman’s responsibilities as directed.
- In carrying out the functions, roles, duties, and responsibilities, the SEAC, as appropriate, consults with and seek the advice of the services' and combatant commands' SEAs on all issues pertaining to joint service members.
- The SEAC convenes regular meetings with the services, combatant commands, and 4th estate SEAs.

== Insignia ==
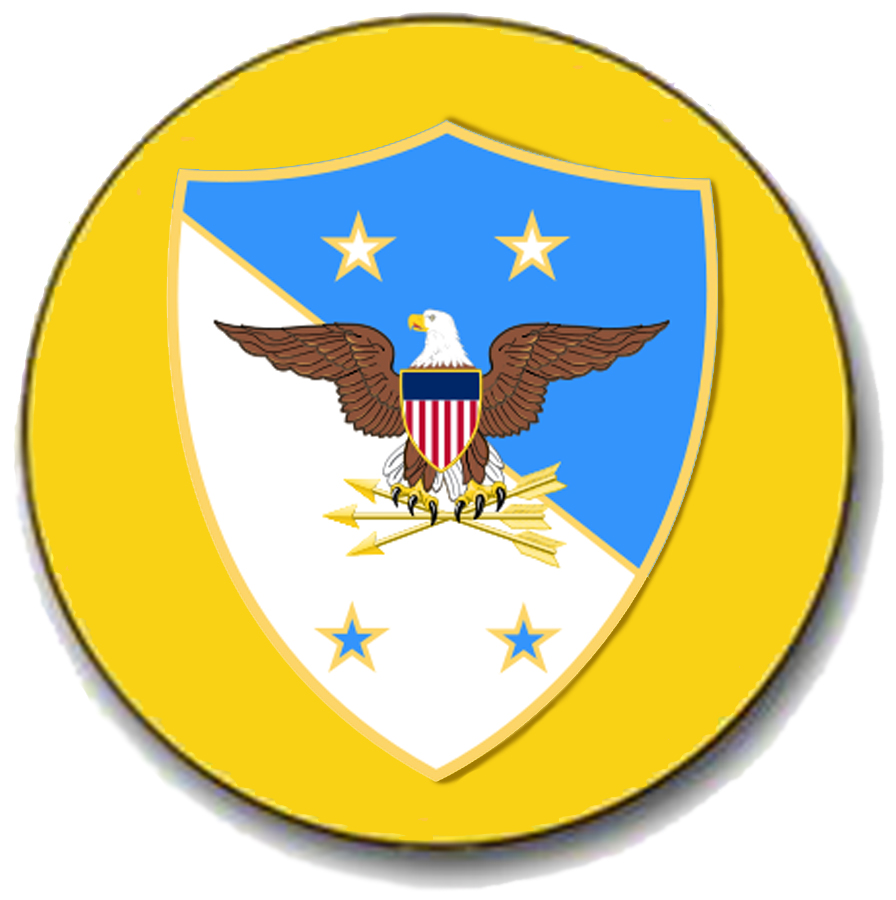
U.S. Army SEAC collar brass insignia

U.S. Army SEACs wear a unique collar insignia featuring the shield portion of the insignia of an aide-de-camp to the chairman of the Joint Chiefs (less the surmounting eagle), placed upon a gold-colored Army enlisted collar disk, one inch in diameter; the collar brass is also worn in place of distinctive unit insignia on his beret, garrison cap, and pull-over sweater, in the same manner as the sergeant major of the Army wears unique collar brass. This insignia is in keeping with the collar devices of U.S. Army enlisted soldiers, and is patterned directly upon that of the Sergeant Major of the Army.

U.S. Navy SEACs wear a unique command senior enlisted leader identification badge on the breast pocket of their duty uniforms that resembles the Master Chief Petty Officer of the Navy (MCPON) Identification Badge but with the word "DEFENSE" instead of "NAVY" at the base of the insignia.

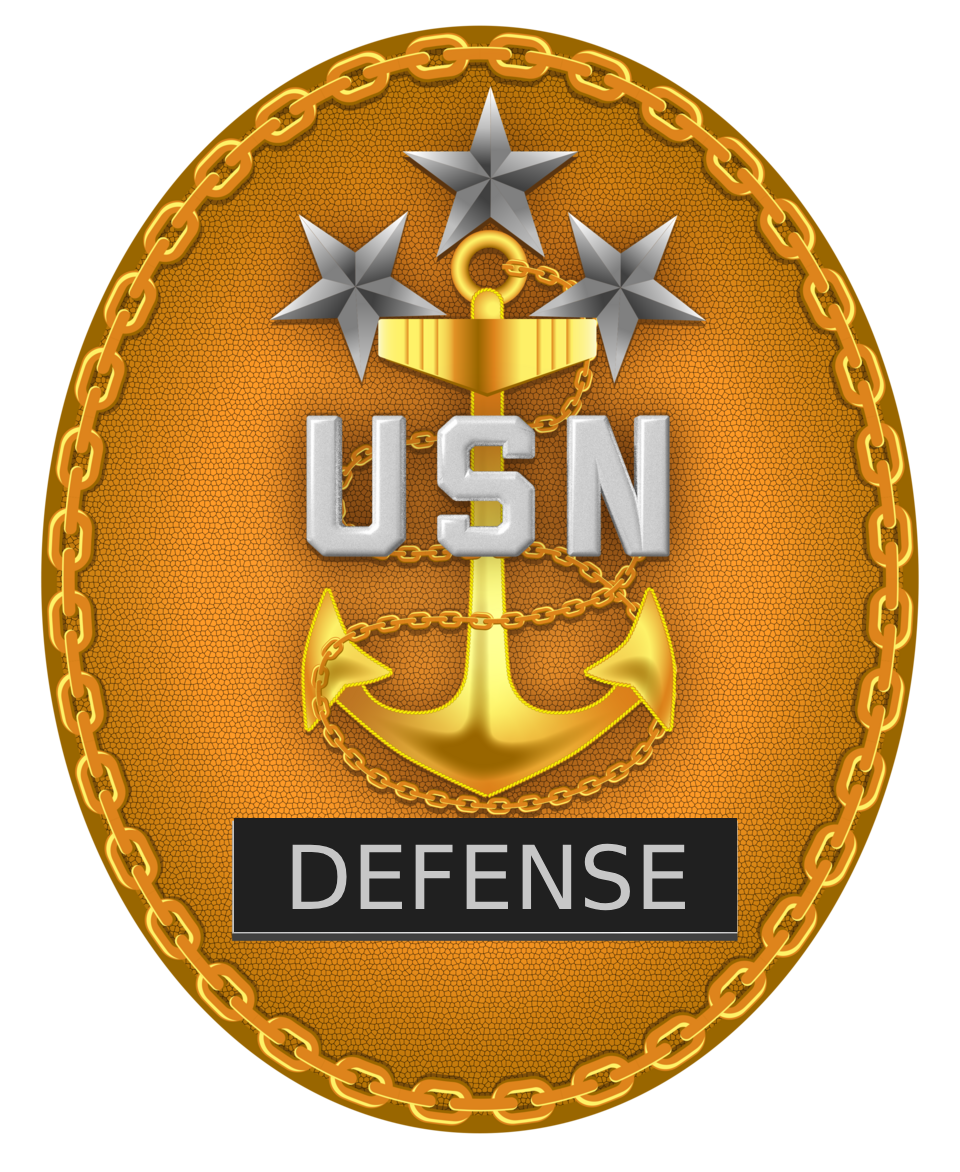
U.S. Navy Master Chief Petty Officer (SEAC) Identification Badge

On 9 December 2019, it was announced that current and future SEACs will wear a unique rank insignia featuring an eagle gripping three arrows surrounded by four stars to be incorporated into the service specific E-9 insignias. SgtMaj Bryan Battaglia and CSM William Gainey's tenure preceded this announcement, thus they wore sergeant major and command sergeant major insignia respectively. By the end of 2019 the Army and Air Force were the only two services that had created a rank service insignia. The Institute of Heraldry was tasked in designing the SEAC rank insignias for all the services. The design of a Marine Corps SEAC rank insignia was completed during fiscal year 2020. The design and development of the Navy SEAC rank insignia was coordinated by the Navy. In 2022, the Space Force had also begun the process of creating a SEAC insignia, which went into effect the following year.

Service Rank insignia

Army insignia
(2019–present)

Marine Corps insignia
(2020–present)

Navy Insignia
(2023–present)

Air Force insignia
(2019–present)

Space Force insignia
(2023–present)

== Positional color and protocol ==
- The sergeant major of the Army, chief master sergeant of the Air Force, chief master sergeant of the Space Force, and the senior enlisted advisor to the chairman are currently the only enlisted members of the United States armed forces to be authorized a positional color (flag).
- The SEAC's positional color is based upon that of the chairman of the Joint Chiefs of Staff, and that of the sergeant major of the Army is based on that of the chief of staff of the Army. The central element of the color is a rendering of the SEAC collar insignia, less the surrounding disk. The diagonal line separating the blue in the upper right from the white in the lower left is continued to the corners of the flag.
- Despite the unique duties and protocol position of this position, the senior enlisted advisor to the chairman remains a non-commissioned officer and, as such, is obliged to render a salute to all commissioned officers and warrant officers. In practice, junior commissioned officers are generally deferential to the senior enlisted advisor to the chairman, given their long record of service. Akin to the sergeants major, chief master sergeants and master chief petty officers of the various service branches, the senior enlisted advisor to the chairman is granted informal precedence over all lieutenant generals and vice admirals in matters of seating, billeting, parking and transportation.

== Pay grade ==
As of April 2025 the senior enlisted advisor to the chairman and the other seven SEAs holds a special paygrade above E-9. In accordance with 37 U.S.C. § 1009, Schedule 8, their base pay is $11,166.90 per month (), regardless of the incumbent's service longevity. By comparison, any other E-9 with at least 40 years of service would receive $10,336.50 per month.

In addition to base pay and normal tax-free allowances, the SEAC and the other SEAs are each entitled to a special taxable allowance of $2,000 per year, in accordance with 37 U.S.C. § 414(b).

== Chronological list ==
No.	Picture	Senior Enlisted Advisor	Took office	Left office	Time in office	Branch	Chairman
1	William Gainey	CSM; William Gainey (born 1956) (Note: The position remained vacant from 25 April 2008 to 1 October 2011.)	1 October 2005	25 April 2008	2 years, 207 days	U.S. Army	Peter Pace; Michael Mullen
2	Bryan B. Battaglia	SgtMaj; Bryan B. Battaglia (born 1961)	1 October 2011	11 December 2015	4 years, 71 days	U.S. Marine Corps	Martin Dempsey; Joseph Dunford
3	John W. Troxell	SEAC; John W. Troxell (born 1964)	11 December 2015	13 December 2019	4 years, 2 days	U.S. Army	Joseph Dunford; Mark Milley
4	Ramón Colón-López	SEAC; Ramón Colón-López (born 1971)	13 December 2019	3 November 2023	3 years, 325 days	U.S. Air Force	Mark Milley; Charles Q. Brown Jr.
5	Troy E. Black	SEAC; Troy E. Black (born 1969)	3 November 2023	20 June 2025	1 year, 229 days	U.S. Marine Corps	Charles Q. Brown Jr. Dan Caine
6	David Isom	SEAC; David Isom	20 June 2025	Incumbent	1 year, 79 days	U.S. Navy	Dan Caine

== See also ==
- Chairman of the Joint Chiefs of Staff
- Senior Enlisted Advisor to the Chiefs of Staff Committee – British Armed Forces equivalent
- Canadian Forces Chief Warrant Officer – Canadian Armed Forces equivalent
