= David Isom =

U.S. Navy SEAL

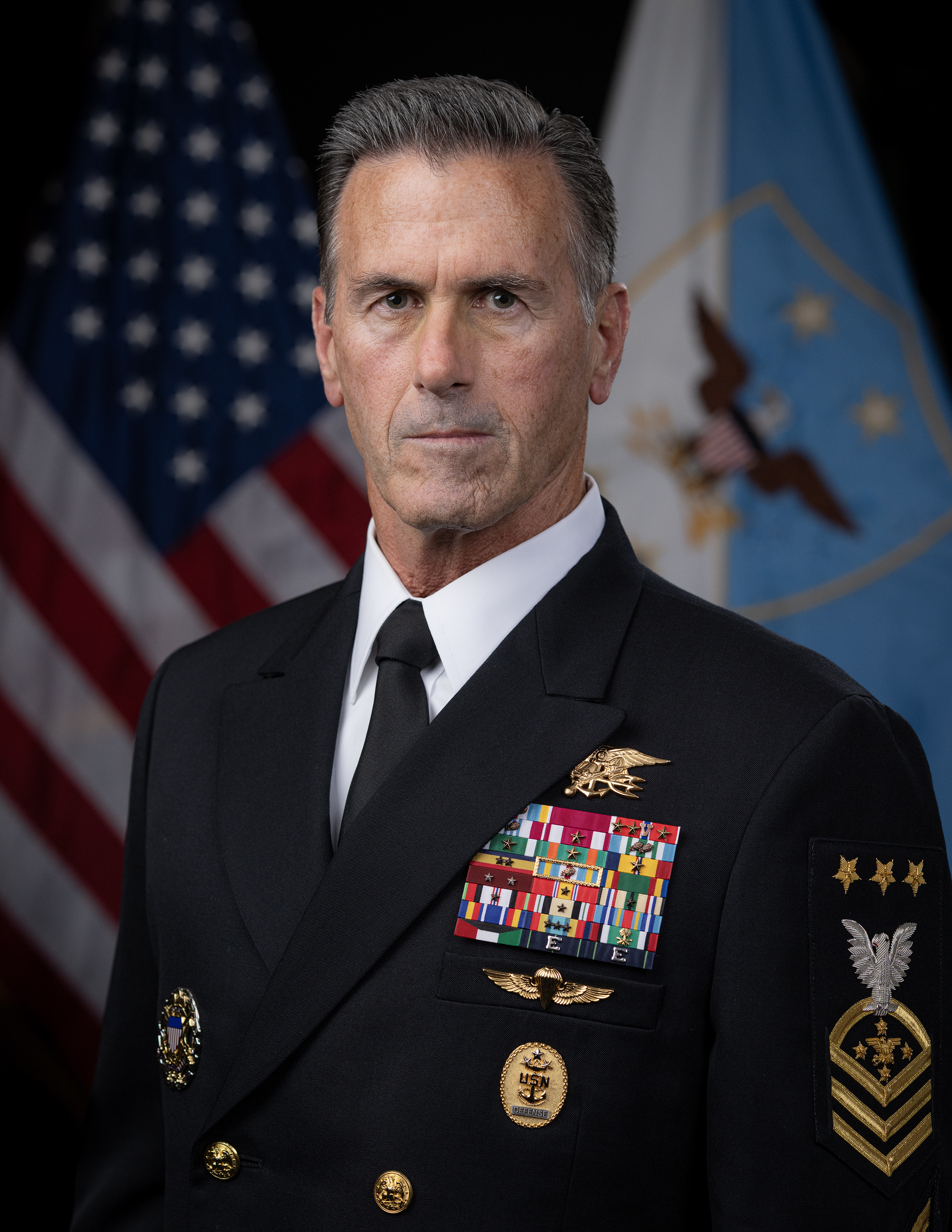
- Official portrait, 2025
- Military career
- Allegiance: United States
- Branch: United States Navy
- Service years: 1987–present
- Rank: Senior Enlisted Advisor to the Chairman
- Conflicts: Gulf War; Iraq War; War in Afghanistan
- Awards: Defense Superior Service Medal; Legion of Merit; Bronze Star Medal (4) with Combat Distinguishing Device (2); Defense Meritorious Service Medal (2)

David L. Isom is a United States Navy SEAL serving as the 6th senior enlisted advisor to the chairman of the Joint Chiefs of Staff (SEAC) since 2025. He is the most senior enlisted member and non-commissioned officer in the United States Armed Forces. Isom previously served as the command senior enlisted leader of United States Indo-Pacific Command.

== Personal life ==
He is the son of Billy Isom, a U.S. Army veteran of the Korean War, and the late Thelma Isom. He has four siblings and is married with six children of his own.

== Military career ==
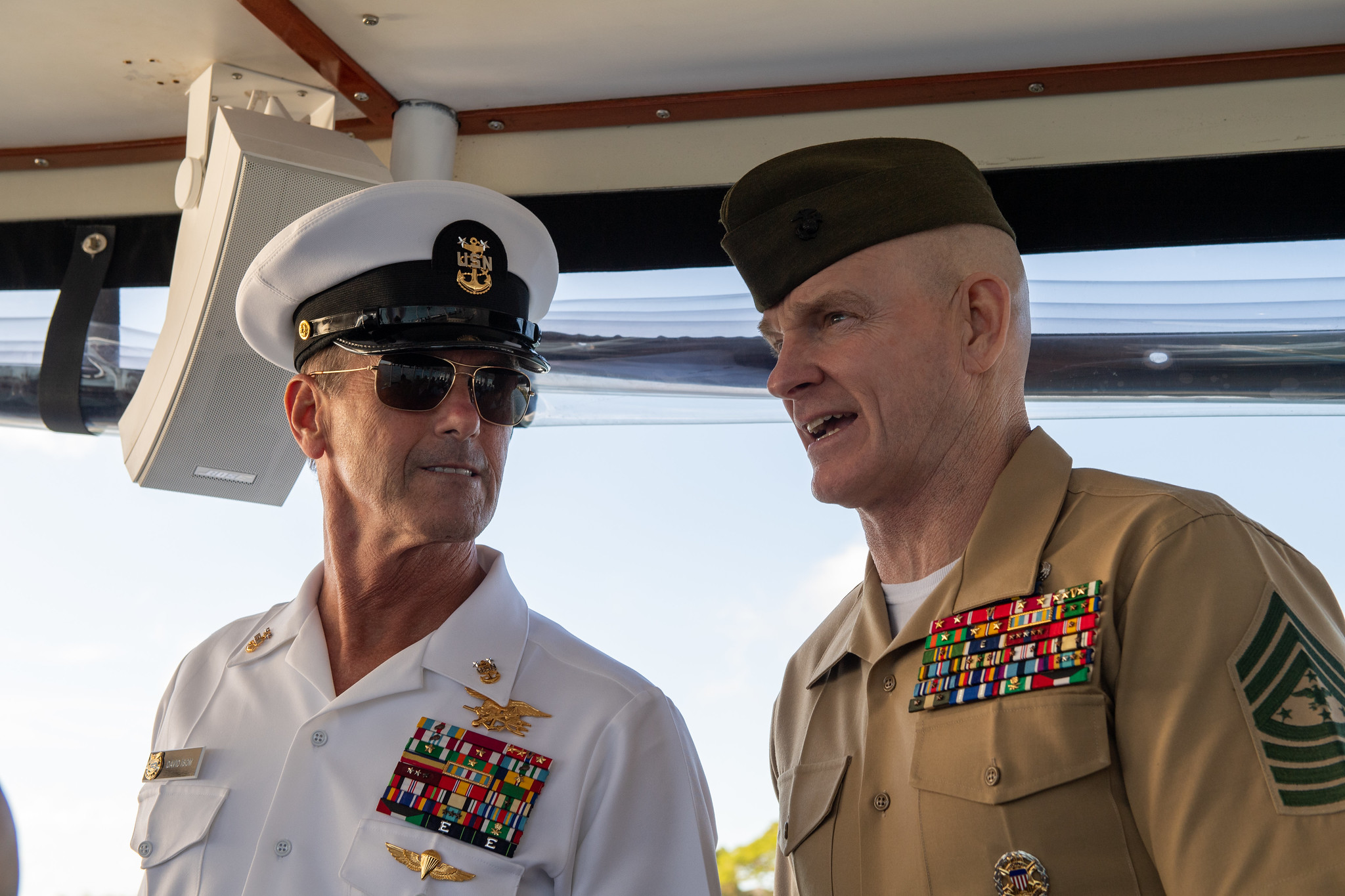
Isom with SEAC Troy Black in May 2025

Isom enlisted in the United States Navy in 1987 and completed recruit training at Recruit Training Command Great Lakes. He was first assigned to the USS Mauna Kea (AE-22) and later to the USS Mount Hood (AE-29). Following these early sea assignments, Isom was selected to attend Basic Underwater Demolition/SEAL (BUD/S) Training, becoming a Navy SEAL.

He began his career in Naval Special Warfare Command with an assignment to SEAL Team One. Over the following years, Isom served in a series of increasingly senior positions, including with Naval Special Warfare Development Group, Joint Special Operations Command, and later at Tactical Development and Evaluation Squadron One. He was also assigned to Special Reconnaissance Team Two, where he served as the command master chief.

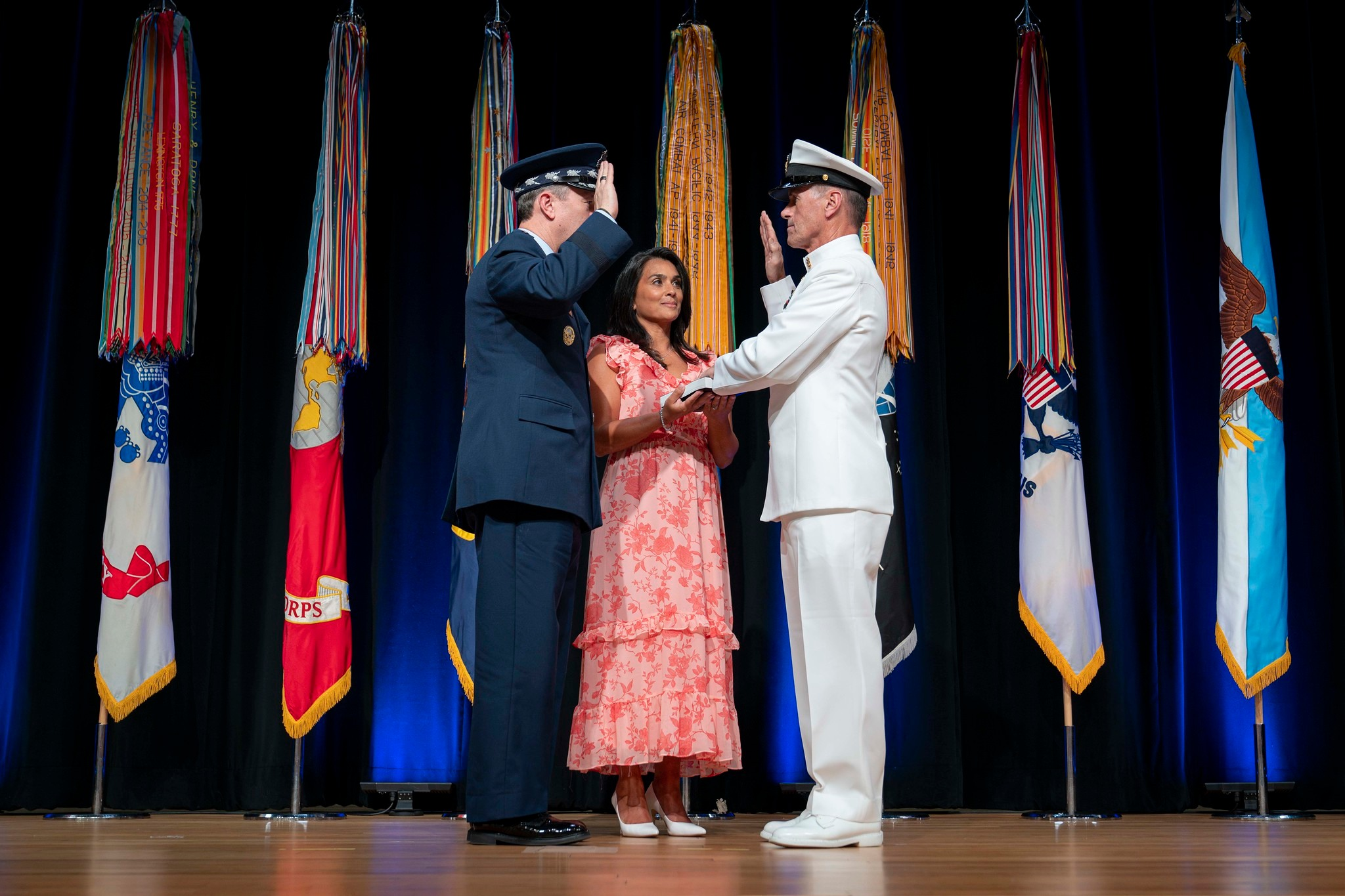
Isom being sworn in as the 6th SEAC on June 24, 2025

Following his operational tours, Isom served as the command master chief of Naval Special Warfare Group Ten. He subsequently held senior enlisted positions as the command senior enlisted leader of Special Operations Command North and then Special Operations Command Pacific. On June 30, 2022, he assumed duties as the command senior enlisted leader of United States Indo-Pacific Command.

Isom deployed in support of multiple combat and contingency operations including Operation Desert Shield, Operation Desert Storm, Operation Enduring Freedom, and Operation Iraqi Freedom. He also participated in numerous deployments throughout the Pacific and the Horn of Africa.

His military education includes the Command Master Chief Course, Joint Special Operations University Senior Enlisted Academy, the U.S. Special Operations Command Summit Course, the National Defense University's Keystone Course, and the Naval Postgraduate School's Navy Senior Leader Seminar. He holds a Bachelor of Science in Strategic Studies from Norwich University.

In May 2025, Isom was selected for appointment as the senior enlisted advisor to the chairman of the Joint Chiefs of Staff, by General Dan Caine, the chairman of the Joint Chiefs of Staff. In June 2025, he assumed the rank and position, becoming the senior-most enlisted service member in the United States Armed Forces. Isom is the first member of the U.S. Navy to serve in the position.

== Awards and decorations ==
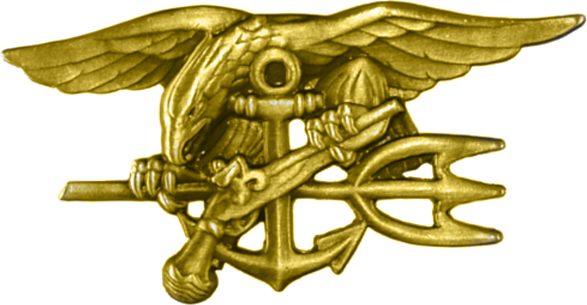

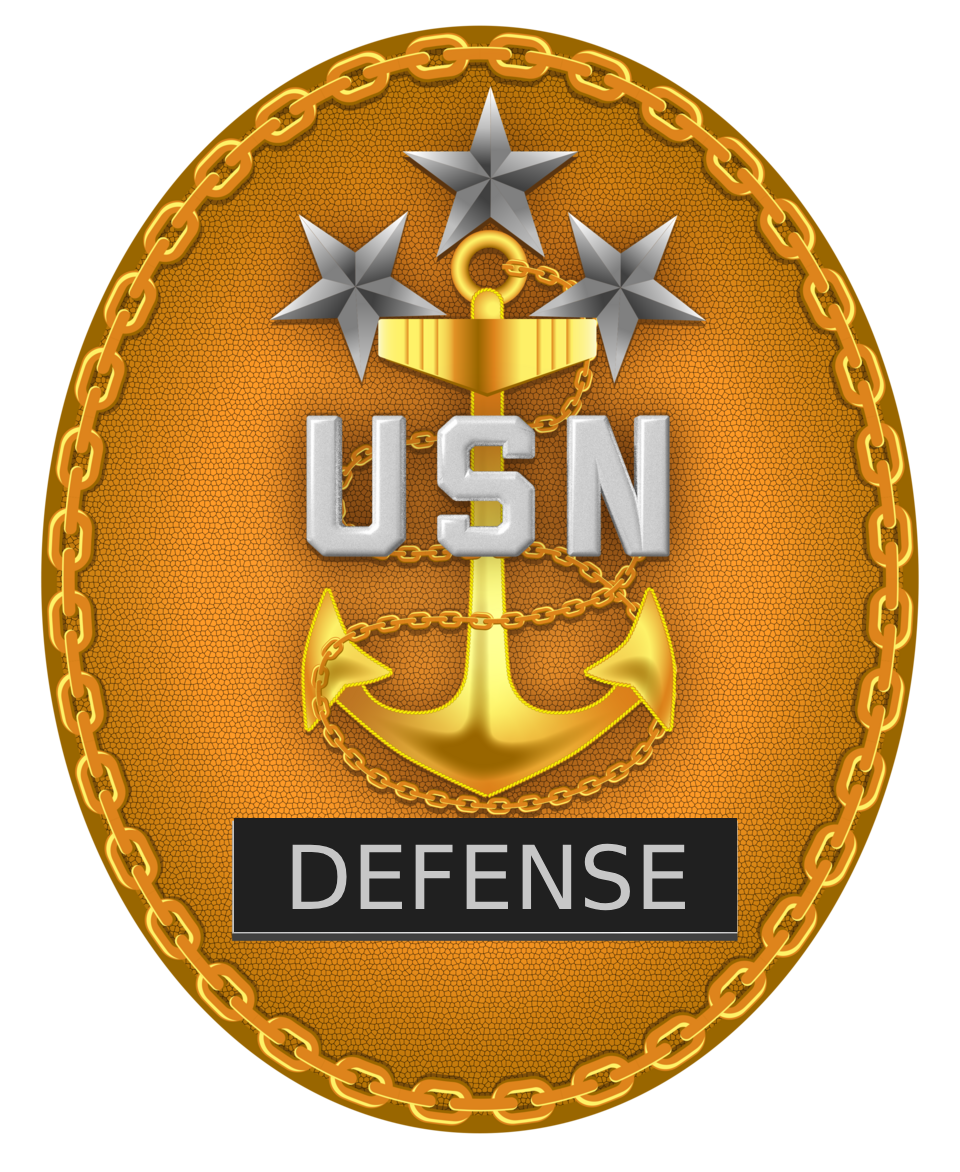

SEAL Trident
Defense Superior Service Medal with bronze oak leaf cluster	Legion of Merit	Bronze Star Medal with Combat "V" and three gold award stars
Defense Meritorious Service Medal with bronze oak leaf cluster	Meritorious Service Medal (United States) with gold award star	Joint Service Commendation Medal with bronze oak leaf cluster
Navy and Marine Corps Commendation Medal with gold award star	Navy and Marine Corps Achievement Medal with gold award star	Combat Action Ribbon with gold award star
Presidential Unit Citation	Joint Meritorious Unit Award	Navy Unit Commendation
Navy Good Conduct Medal with two silver service stars and one bronze service star	National Defense Service Medal	Southwest Asia Service Medal with bronze campaign star
Afghanistan Campaign Medal	Iraq Campaign Medal	Global War on Terrorism Expeditionary Medal
Global War on Terrorism Service Medal	Navy Sea Service Deployment Ribbon with three bronze service stars	Kuwait Liberation Medal (Saudi Arabia)
Kuwait Liberation Medal (Kuwait)	Navy Expert Rifleman Medal	Navy Expert Pistol Shot Medal
Navy and Marine Corps Parachutist Insignia
Office of the Joint Chiefs of Staff Identification Badge		Senior Enlisted Advisor to the Chairman Identification Badge

Military offices
Preceded by James Honea	Senior Enlisted Leader, U.S. Indo-Pacific Command; 2022–2025	Succeeded by Eric D. Cook
Preceded by Troy E. Black	Senior Enlisted Advisor to the Chairman; 2025–present	Incumbent
