= William Gainey =

First Senior Enlisted Advisor to the Chairman

William J. Gainey
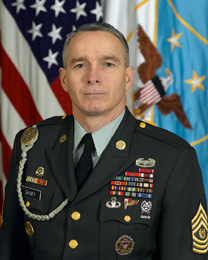
- Born: May 27, 1956 (age 70); Jacksonville, Florida
- Military career
- Allegiance: United States
- Branch: United States Army
- Service years: 1974–2008
- Rank: Senior Enlisted Advisor to the Chairman
- Nickname: Fighting Joe
- Conflicts: Iraq War
- Awards: Army Distinguished Service Medal; Defense Superior Service Medal; Legion of Merit (2); Bronze Star Medal; Meritorious Service Medal (8); Army Commendation Medal (8); Army Achievement Medal (2)

William Joseph Gainey (born May 27, 1956) is a retired United States Army soldier who served as the first senior enlisted advisor to the chairman of the Joint Chiefs of Staff.

== Early life ==
Gainey was born in Jacksonville, Florida, on May 27, 1956.

== Military career ==
Gainey enlisted in the United States Army under the Delayed Entry Program in 1974 and entered basic training at Fort Knox, Kentucky on June 17, 1975. Thereafter, he served in a number of enlisted leadership positions, from gunner to command sergeant major.

Gainey's assignments include: driver, loader, gunner, and tank commander in the 1st Battalion, 67th Armor (Tiger Brigade), 2nd Armored Division, Fort Hood, Texas; gunner, tank commander, and platoon sergeant in the 4th Battalion, 73rd Armored, 1st Infantry Division, Böblingen, Germany; platoon leader in the 2nd Battalion, 70th Armored, 24th Infantry Division, Fort Stewart, Georgia; drill sergeant and senior drill sergeant in the 19th Battalion, 4th Training Brigade, Fort Knox; platoon sergeant and Operations Sergeant in the 3rd Battalion, 73rd Armor, 82nd Airborne Division, Fort Bragg, North Carolina; platoon sergeant and first sergeant in the 1st Battalion, 509th Infantry Airborne, Joint Readiness Training Center, Little Rock Air Force Base, Arkansas; Senior Enlisted Armor Advisor, Fort Jackson, South Carolina.

Gainey served as the command sergeant major for the 2nd Battalion, 68th Armored Regiment, and 1st Battalion, 35th Armored Regiment, 2nd Brigade Combat Team, 1st Armored Division, Baumholder, Germany; Eagle Base, Bosnia and Herzegovina; 1st Squadron, 2nd Armored Cavalry Regiment, Fort Polk; 2nd Brigade, 3rd Infantry Division, Fort Stewart; 2nd Armored Cavalry Regiment, Fort Polk; The United States Army Armor Center, Fort Knox; and as the command sergeant major for the III Corps and Fort Hood at Fort Hood, Texas.

Gainey served in Operation Joint Endeavor (IFOR), Operation Joint Guard (SFOR 3) and Operation Joint Forge (SFOR 8) in Bosnia and Herzegovina. He served as the command sergeant major for the Combined Joint Task Force 7 (CJTF-7) and as the command sergeant major of the Multi-National Corps Iraq (MNC-I) in Operation Iraqi Freedom II.

Gainey attended numerous military schools and training programs to include: the Drill Sergeant School; Airborne School; Jumpmaster School; Air Movement Officer's Course; Observer Controller Course; First Sergeants Course; Pathfinder School; and the United States Army Sergeants Major Academy, Class 41. Gainey holds an Associate of Applied Science degree from Vincennes University, a Bachelor of Science degree in Business Administration from Touro University International and a Master of Arts degree in Education and a Master of Science in Leadership from Trident University International.

On October 1, 2005 Gainey was appointed the first Senior Enlisted Advisor to the Chairman of the Joint Chiefs of Staff, a newly created position established to advise the Chairman on matters of professional development of enlisted personnel assigned to joint billets.

== Retirement ==
Since his retirement from the army, Gainey has taken a board member position at Trident University International.

== Awards and decorations ==

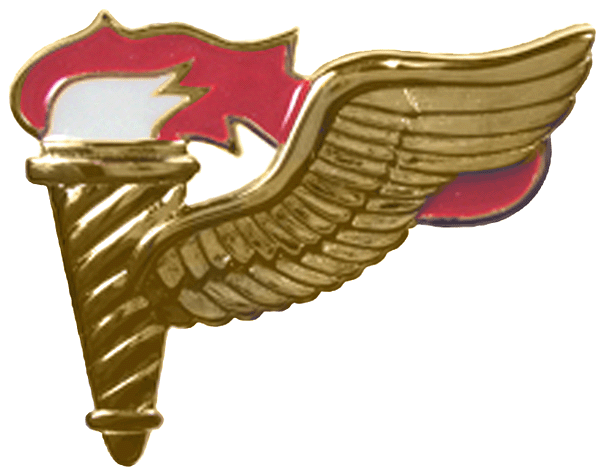
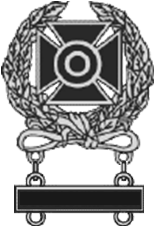

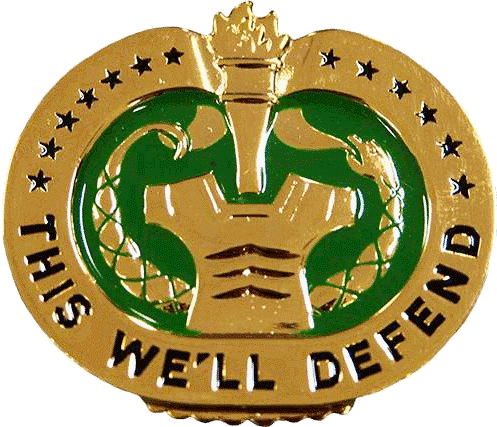

- Combat Action Badge
- Army Distinguished Service Medal
- Defense Superior Service Medal
- Legion of Merit (with 1 bronze oak leaf cluster)
- Bronze Star Medal (with Valor device)
- Meritorious Service Medal (with 1 silver and 2 bronze oak leaf clusters)
- Army Commendation Medal (with 1 silver and 2 bronze oak leaf clusters)
- Army Achievement Medal (with oak leaf cluster)
- Army Good Conduct Medal (gold clasp with 1 Good Conduct Loop)
- Joint Meritorious Unit Award
- Army Superior Unit Award
- National Defense Service Medal (with 2 service stars)
- Armed Forces Expeditionary Medal (with 2 service stars)
- Iraq Campaign Medal
- Global War on Terrorism Expeditionary Medal
- Global War on Terrorism Service Medal
- Armed Forces Service Medal
- NCO Professional Development Ribbon (with "4" award numeral)
- Army Service Ribbon
- Army Overseas Service Ribbon (with "4" award numeral)
- NATO Medal (with 2 service stars)
- German Sports Badge (Sportabzeichen in Bronze)

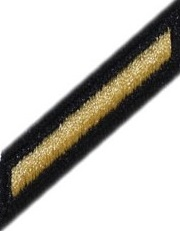
| 11 Service stripes |
| 2 Overseas Service Bars |

Gainey is also a recipient of:

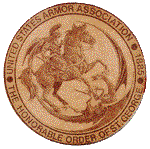
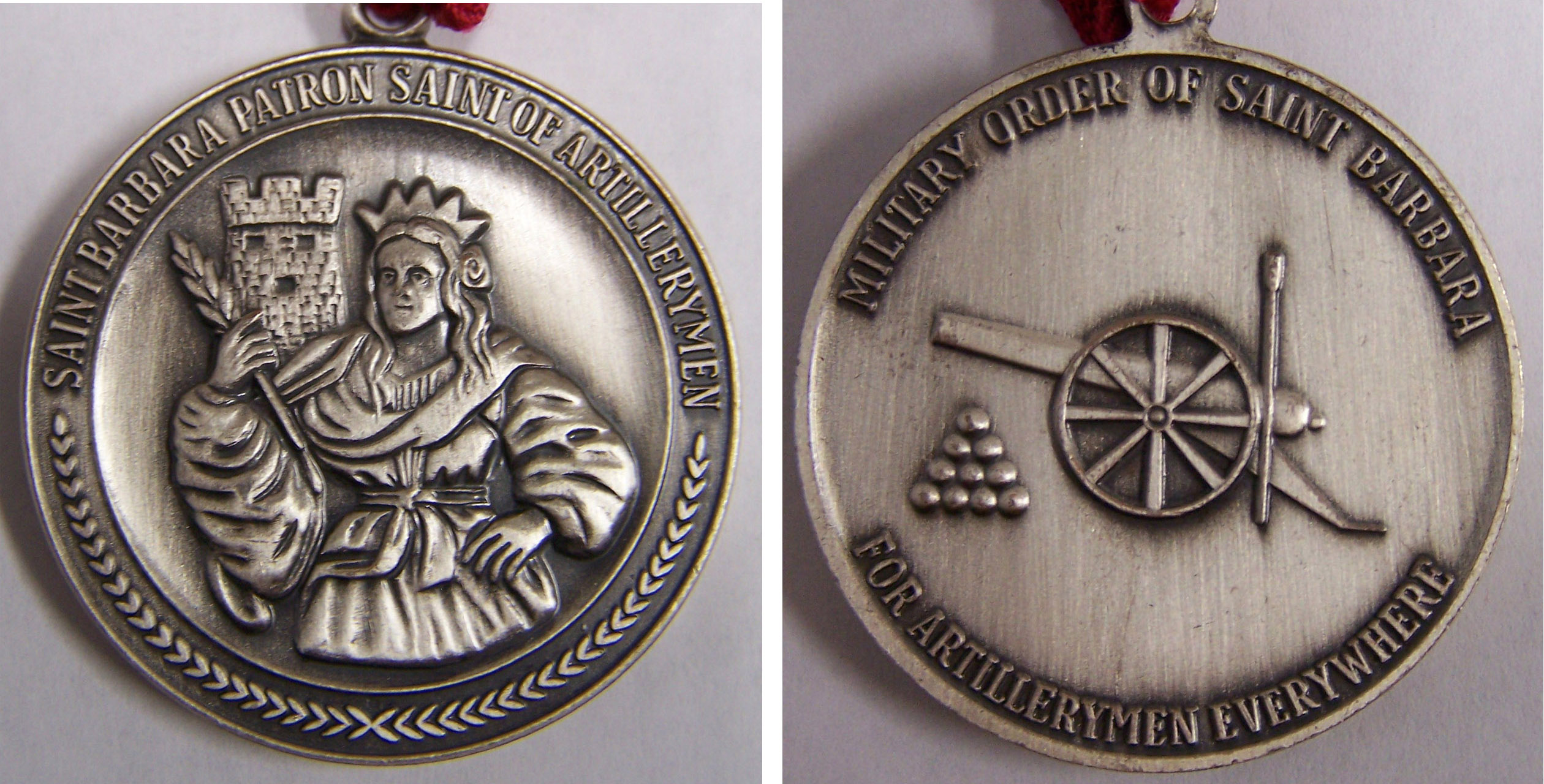
| Gold Medallion of the Honorable Order of Saint George, United States Armor Association |
| Silver Medallion of the Ancient Order of Saint Barbara, Air Defense Artillery Association |

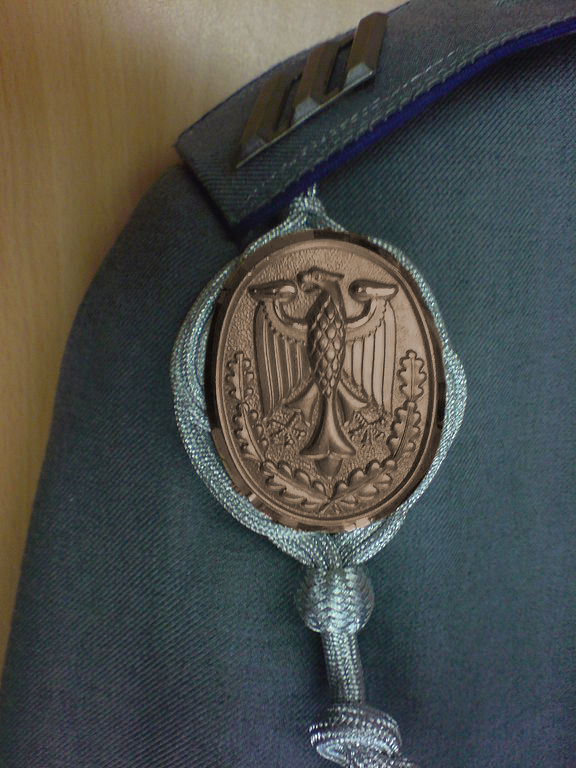
| German Armed Forces Badge of Marksmanship (Schützenschnur in Bronze) |

Military offices
| New office | Senior Enlisted Advisor to the Chairman; 2005—2008 | Vacant Title next held by Bryan B. Battaglia in 2011 |
