= John W. Troxell =

3rd Senior Enlisted Advisor to the Chairman

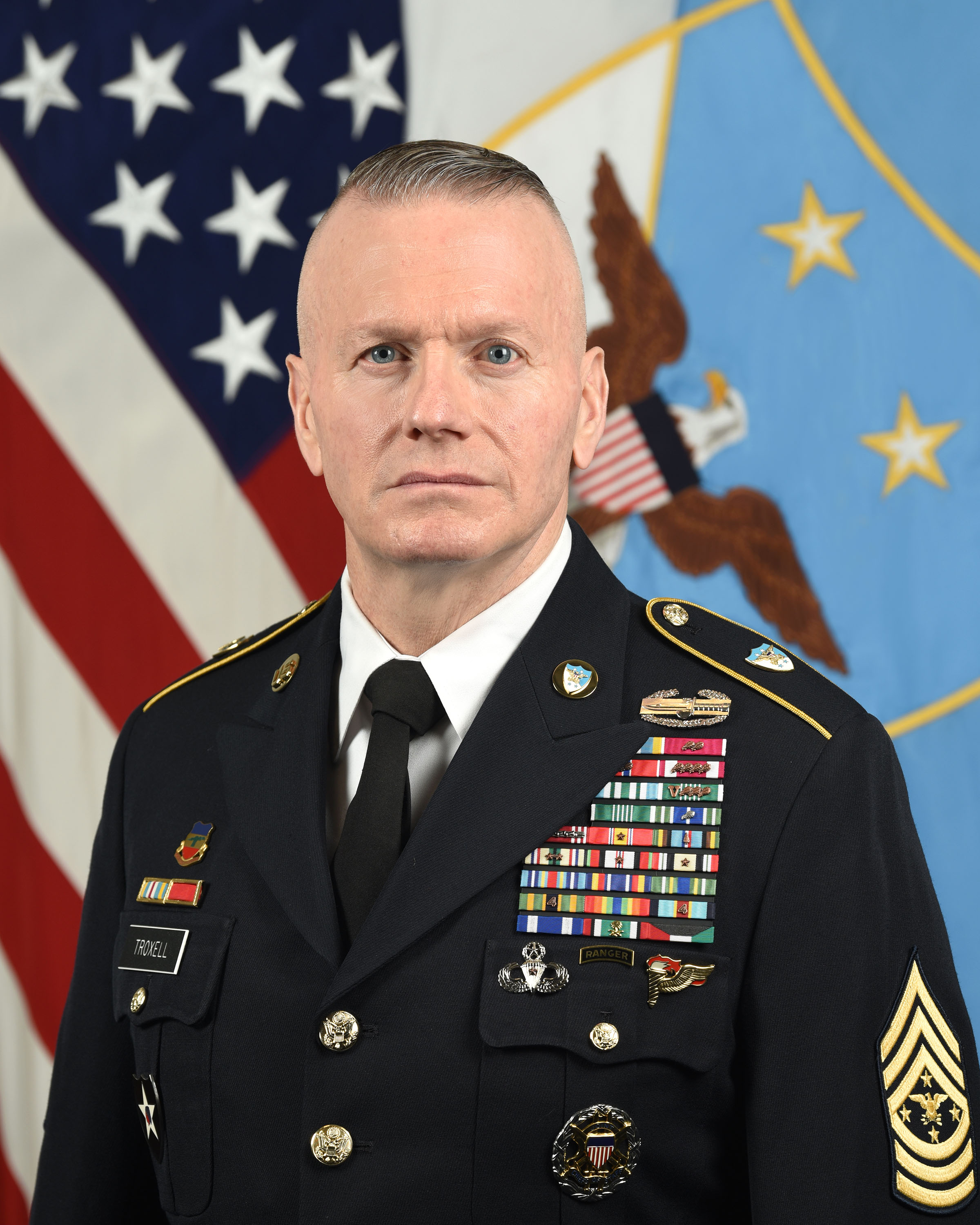
- Command Sergeant Major John W. Troxell with the new SEAC rank insignia, December 2019
- Born: c. 1964 (age c. 62); Davenport, Iowa
- Military career
- Allegiance: United States
- Branch: United States Army
- Service years: 1982–2020
- Rank: Senior Enlisted Advisor to the Chairman
- Conflicts: Operation Just Cause; Gulf War; War in Afghanistan; Iraq War
- Awards: Defense Superior Service Medal (3); Legion of Merit (3); Bronze Star Medal (2); Meritorious Service Medal (5); Joint Service Commendation Medal; Army Commendation Medal (5) w/ "V"; Army Achievement Medal (6)

John Wayne Troxell (born c. 1964) is a retired United States Army senior non-commissioned officer who served as the third Senior Enlisted Advisor to the Chairman of the Joint Chiefs of Staff (SEAC). This position made him the most senior enlisted member of the United States Armed Forces. He enlisted in the United States Army in September 1982, as an armored reconnaissance specialist and graduated from One Station Unit Training at Fort Knox, Kentucky.

== Army career ==
Troxell served in the United States Army for over 37 years in numerous units throughout his career. They included the 3rd Armored Cavalry Regiment in Fort Bliss, Texas; 2 tours in Germany with the 3rd Armored Division, and the 3rd Infantry Division; 3 tours in the 82nd Airborne Division at Fort Bragg, North Carolina; Campbell University Reserve Officers' Training Corps in Buies Creek, North Carolina, and the Special Operation Division of Joint Task Force Six (Counterdrug) in El Paso, Texas. He has served as the command sergeant major of the 3rd Squadron, 17th Cavalry Regiment, 10th Mountain Division, Fort Drum, New York and in Iraq; the regimental command sergeant major of the 2nd Stryker Cavalry Regiment in both Fort Polk, Louisiana and Fort Lewis, Washington; the command sergeant major of the 4th Stryker Brigade Combat Team, 2d Infantry Division, Fort Lewis, Washington and in Iraq; the 21st command sergeant major of the U.S. Army Armor Center and Fort Knox, Kentucky; the command sergeant major of the U.S. Army Accessions Command and Human Resource Center of Excellence at Fort Knox, Kentucky, the command sergeant major of I Corps at Joint Base Lewis-McChord, Washington, the command sergeant major of the International Security Assistance Force Joint Command in Afghanistan and the Command Senior Enlisted Leader of United Nations Command/Combined Forces Command/United States Forces Korea. His official date of retirement was on March 31, 2020.

Troxell's five combat tours of duty included making the combat parachute jump and service in Operation Just Cause in Panama, Operation Desert Shield/Storm, two tours in Operation Iraqi Freedom, and Operation Enduring Freedom in Afghanistan. His military education includes Ranger, Airborne, Jumpmaster, Pathfinder, PLDC, BNCOC, ANCOC, and the First Sergeant Course. He is a graduate of Class 51 of the U.S. Army Sergeants Major Course and the Command Sergeants Major Course. Troxell is also a graduate of the National Defense University Keystone Joint Command Senior Enlisted Leader Course, the United States Army War College Strategic Leader Development Course and the Army Strategic Leader Development Course (Intermediate) at the University of North Carolina at Chapel Hill. Troxell's civilian education includes a Master's degree in Business Administration from TUI University in California. He is a Centurion of the Order of Saint Maurice (National Infantry Association).

=== Suspension ===
Troxell was re-assigned from Senior Enlisted Advisor to Special Assistant to the Vice Director of the Joint Staff, from September 2018 to March 2019, pending the outcome of an investigation of misconduct. An Army Inspector General investigation determined Troxell was guilty of “the improper use of U.S. military personnel to conduct tasks not associated with their official duties, such as personal errands, and improper endorsement of commercial fitness and nutrition products on official SEAC social media platforms." The investigation found there was no personal or monetary gain from these endorsements. Troxell was administratively disciplined for breaching ethics rules and re-instated.

== Awards and decorations ==
Combat Action Badge
Ranger tab
Master Parachutist Badge with one bronze Combat Jump Device
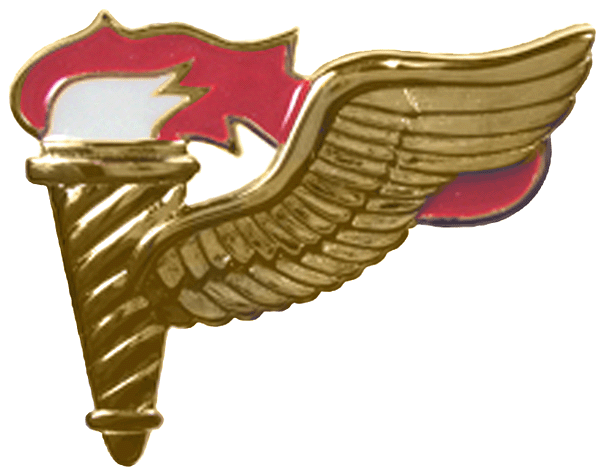
Pathfinder Badge
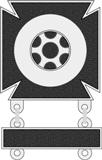
Driver and Mechanic Badge
Joint Chiefs of Staff Identification Badge
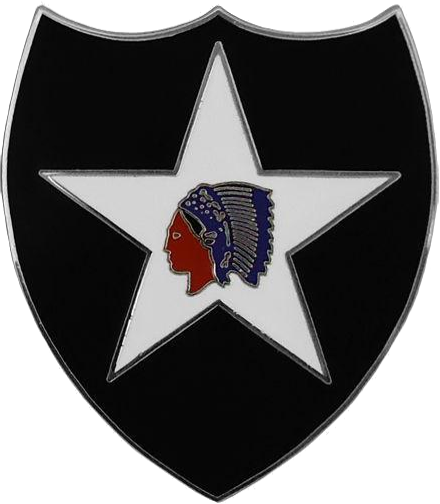
2nd Infantry Division Combat Service Identification Badge
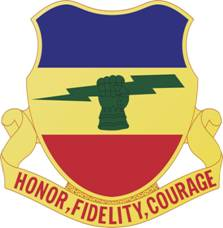
73rd Cavalry Regiment Distinctive Unit Insignia
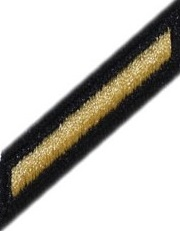
12 Service stripes
7 Overseas Service Bars

| Defense Superior Service Medal with two bronze oak leaf clusters |
| Legion of Merit with two oak leaf clusters |
| Bronze Star Medal with oak leaf cluster |
| Meritorious Service Medal with four oak leaf clusters |
| Joint Service Commendation Medal |
| Army Commendation Medal with "V" device and three oak leaf clusters |
| Army Commendation Medal (second ribbon to denote fifth award) |
| Army Achievement Medal with silver oak leaf cluster |
| Joint Meritorious Unit Award |
| Meritorious Unit Commendation |
| Army Good Conduct Medal (11 awards) |
| National Defense Service Medal with one bronze service star |
| Armed Forces Expeditionary Medal with Arrowhead device |
| Southwest Asia Service Medal with two campaign stars |
| Afghanistan Campaign Medal with one campaign star |
| Iraq Campaign Medal with one campaign star |
| Global War on Terrorism Expeditionary Medal |
| Global War on Terrorism Service Medal |
| Korea Defense Service Medal |
| NCO Professional Development Ribbon with bronze award numeral 4 |
| Army Service Ribbon |
| Army Overseas Service Ribbon with award numeral 4 |
| NATO Meritorious Service Medal |
| NATO Medal for service with ISAF |
| Kuwait Liberation Medal (Saudi Arabia) |
| Kuwait Liberation Medal (Kuwait) |

- CSM Troxell is a Centurion of the Order of Saint Maurice (National Infantry Association).

Military offices
| Preceded by Bryan B. Battaglia | Senior Enlisted Advisor to the Chairman; 2015–2019 | Succeeded by Ramón Colón-López |
