= Title 37 of the United States Code =

U.S. federal statutes on pay of uniformed services

Title 37 of the United States Code outlines the role of Pay and Allowances of the Uniformed Services in the United States Code.

== Contents ==
- 37 U.S.C. ch. 1—Definitions
- 37 U.S.C. ch. 3—Basic Pay
- 37 U.S.C. ch. 5—Special and Incentive Pays
- 37 U.S.C. ch. 7—Allowances Other Than Travel and Transportation Allowances
- 37 U.S.C. ch. 8—Travel and Transportation Allowances
- 37 U.S.C. ch. 9—Leave
- 37 U.S.C. ch. 10—Payments to Missing Persons
- 37 U.S.C. ch. 11—Payments to Mentally Incompetent Persons
- 37 U.S.C. ch. 13—Allotments and Assignments of Pay
- 37 U.S.C. ch. 15—Prohibitions and Penalties
- 37 U.S.C. ch. 17—Miscellaneous Rights and Benefits
- 37 U.S.C. ch. 19—Administration
