= Teach-out =

Education institution closure arrangement

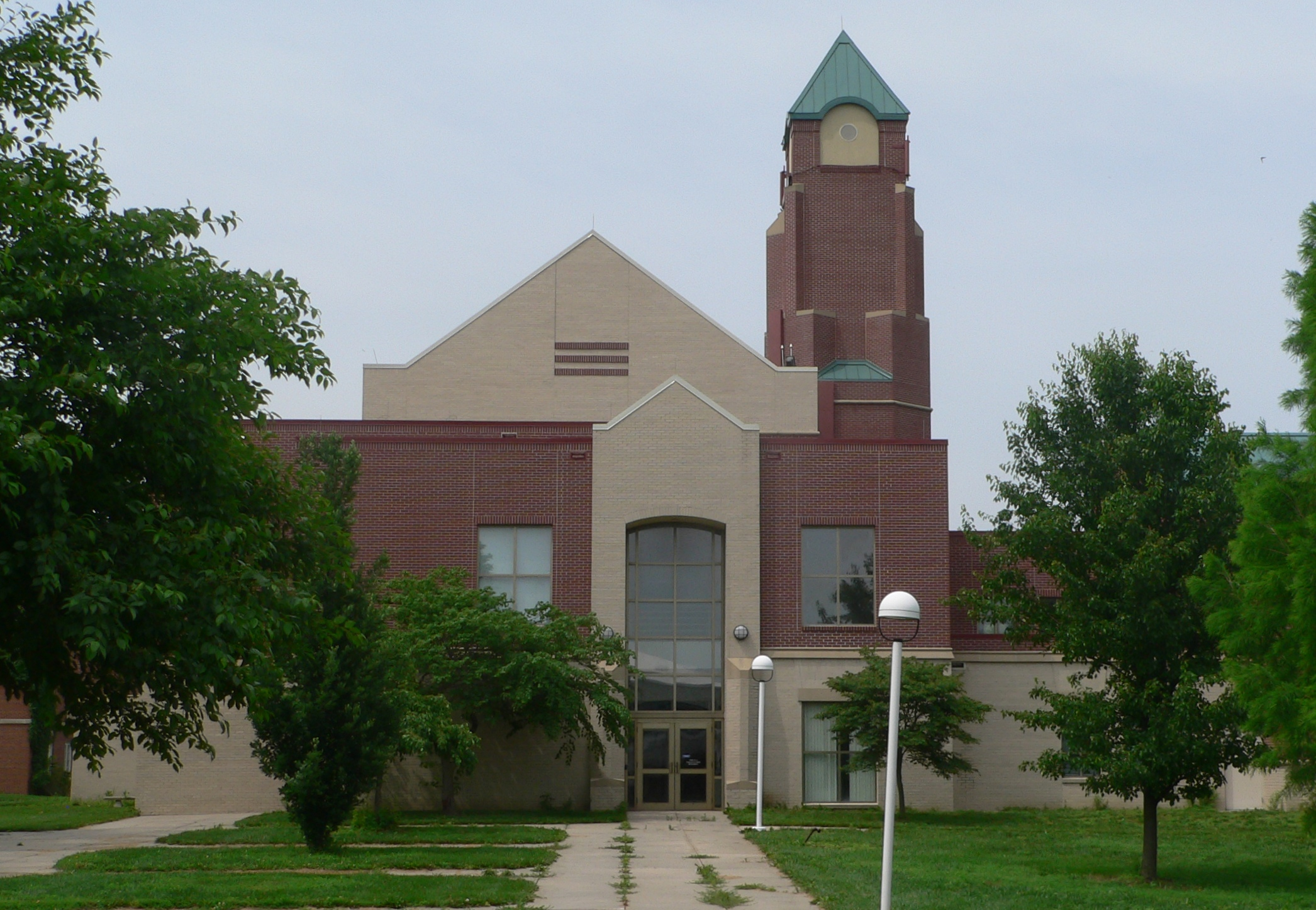
Dana College entered teach-out status in 2010.

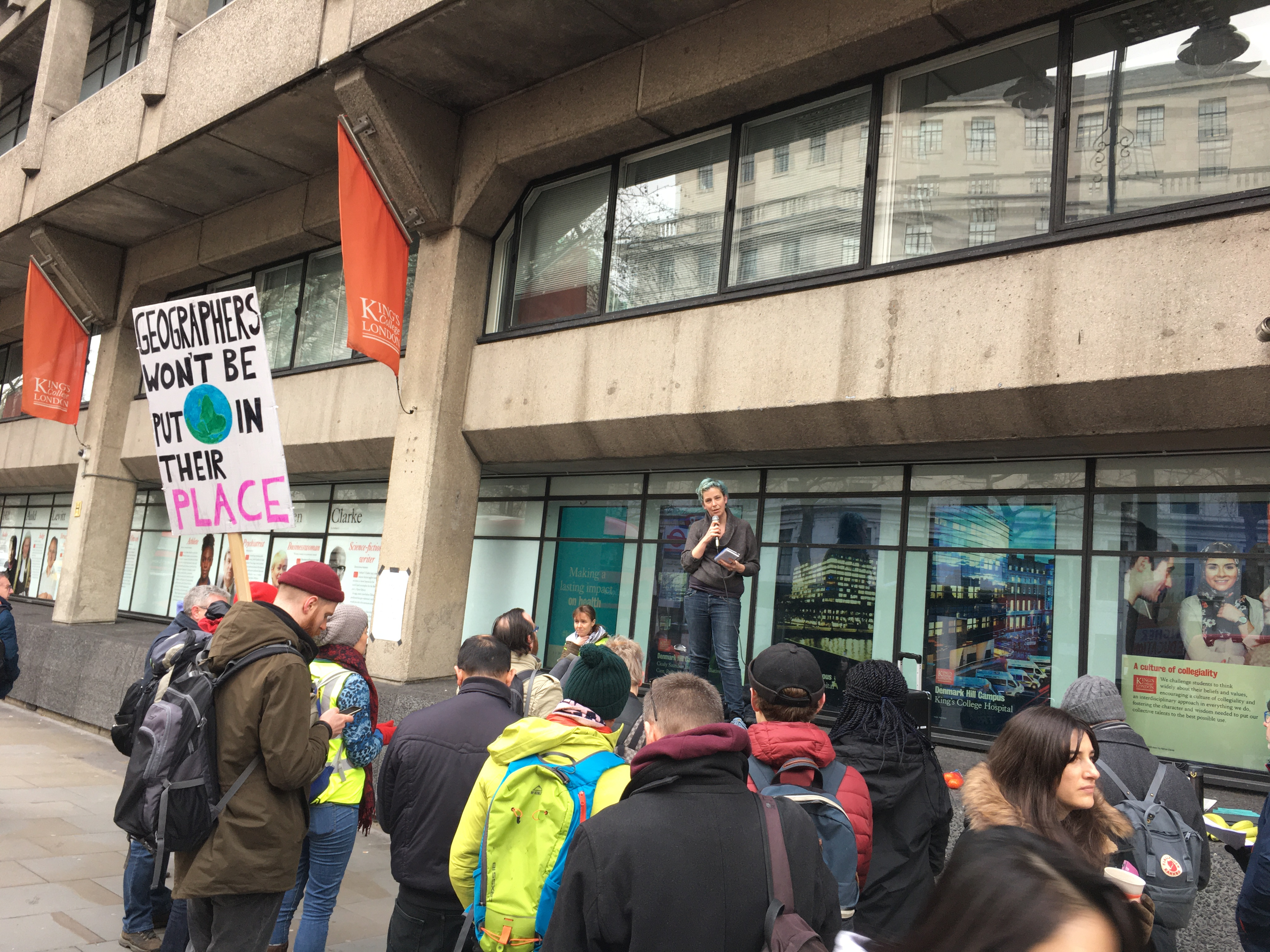
Teach-out staged by the University and College Union in front of King's College London in 2020

A teach-out or teachout is an arrangement by which an educational institution provides its current students with the opportunity to complete their course of study when the institution closes or stops accepting new students into the course.

One common teach-out arrangement is for an institution or program to stop accepting new entrants, but continue teaching existing students until they have completed their course of study. Another common arrangement is for an institution to have an agreement for another institution (the "teach-out institution") to allow all students of the closing institution to complete their program at the teach-out institution.

In the United States, all federally recognized accreditors must require every institution they accredit to submit a teach-out plan. Each accreditor sets plan requirements independently, however, and there are no universal requirements. The Higher Education Act of 1965 was amended to add the teach-out requirement in 1992.

In Australia, under the Higher Education Standards Framework 2015, the Tertiary Education Quality and Standards Agency (TEQSA) requires all providers of accredited courses to prepare a teachout plan. Teachout arrangements must ensure that "all existing students can either complete the course of study, or transition to a mutually agreed course at no disadvantage". Accreditation requirements must continue to be met until teachout is complete. A provider may place a course in teachout mode, or TEQSA may do so on its own initiative.

A teach-out can also occur when a trade union in the educational realm puts on an event as part of an industrial action, where speakers deliver classroom-like content that purportedly replaces whatever regular classes might be missed due to the action. More generally, teach-outs can refer to any event that exists along the lines of, in the words of the University of Michigan, "just-in-time global community learning events focusing on current issues, that enable a wide variety of people to join the [institution's] campus community in exploring a timely topic."

== Works cited ==
- Congressional Research Service (2019). "The Closure of Institutions of Higher Education: Student Options, Borrower Relief, and Other Implications" (PDF).
