= Charles Miller (colonel) =

US Army colonel

- Born: 13 November 1862; Kingdom of Württemberg
- Died: 11 August 1928 (aged 65); Rockwell Field, California, US
- Burial place: Skylawn Memorial Park, San Mateo, California, US
- Spouse: Mary Berry Donavin (m. 1895–1928)
- Children: 7
- Military career
- Service: United States Army
- Service years: 1884–1919
- Rank: Colonel
- Service number: 013365
- Units: US Army Cavalry Branch; US Army Infantry Branch
- Commands: Commandant of the United States Army Command and General Staff College; Infantry Central Officers' Training School, Camp Pike; Camp Pike
- Wars: Spanish–American War; Philippine–American War; Battle of Veracruz; Mexican Border War; World War I

Charles Miller (13 November 1862 – 11 August 1928) was a career soldier in the United States Army. He served as an enlisted man in the Cavalry from 1884 to 1890 and attained the rank of first sergeant. He was then commissioned a second lieutenant of Infantry and he served until retiring as a colonel in 1919. Miller was a veteran of the Spanish–American War, Philippine–American War, Battle of Veracruz, Mexican Border War, and World War I, and his command assignments included Commandant of the United States Army Command and General Staff College, the Infantry Central Officers' Training School at Camp Pike, Arkansas, and the post at Camp Pike.

== Biography ==
Charles Miller was born in the Kingdom of Württemberg on 13 November 1862. He attended the public schools of Württemberg until age 11, which was followed by three years at a Württemberg Latin school. He was then accepted at Württemberg's Royal Seminary for Public Teachers, from which he graduated with honors in 1879. In 1880, he emigrated to the United States and settled with an aunt and uncle in the Bridesburg neighborhood of Philadelphia. Miller worked at his uncle's store, completed an English language course, and gave music lessons until deciding on a military career.

In January 1884, Miller enlisted in the United States Army. Assigned to Troop M, 8th Cavalry Regiment as a private, he advanced to corporal, sergeant, and first sergeant. In January 1890, Miller became a naturalized citizen of the United States. In November 1890, he was commissioned as a second lieutenant of Infantry. In 1893, he graduated from the Infantry and Cavalry School. In July 1895, Miller married Mary Berry Donavin of Baltimore. They were married until his death and were the parents of 7 children.

During the Spanish–American War, Miller's duties included temporary recruiting and mustering officer postings in Baltimore. During the Philippine–American War, he served in the Philippines as first lieutenant in the 16th Infantry Regiment, then as a captain of United States Volunteers. In 1914, Miller served with the 7th Infantry during the Battle of Veracruz, which took place during the US response to the Mexican Revolution.

In the years before World War I, Miller's assignments included senior instructor in the department of languages at the School of the Line (now the United States Army Command and General Staff College) and the school's assistant commandant. In 1916, he was assigned duty as mustering in officer for Missouri National Guard soldiers called to active duty during the Mexican Border War. In June and July 1917, he served as commandant of the School of the Line. During the war, Miller commanded the post at Camp Pike, Arkansas and its Infantry Central Officers' Training School (I.C.O.T.). After the Armistice of November 11, 1918 ended the war, Miller was retired for disability. He left the army in February 1919.

In retirement, Miller resided in Chula Vista, California. He died at Rockwell Field, California on 11 August 1928. Miller was cremated in San Diego, and his remains were eventually interred at Skylawn Memorial Park in San Mateo, California.

== Dates of rank ==
Miller's dates of rank were:

- Private, 21 January 1884
- Corporal, 24 April 1885
- Sergeant, 2 June 1886
- First Sergeant, 14 October 1888
- Second Lieutenant, 8 November 1890
- First Lieutenant, 7 August 1897
- Captain (United States Volunteers), 5 July 1899
- Captain, 2 February 1900
- Major, 21 June 1911
- Lieutenant Colonel, 10 August 1916
- Colonel (National Army), 5 August 1917
- Colonel (Retired), 2 February 1919

== Works by ==
- "The Organization of the German Army". Infantry Journal. Washington, DC: United States Infantry Association. March–April 1914. pp. 712–728 – via Google Books.
- "The Organization of the German Army (Continued)". Infantry Journal. Washington, DC: United States Infantry Association. May–June 1914. pp. 879–895 – via Google Books.
- "A Test of the Swiss Military System". Infantry Journal. Washington, DC: United States Infantry Association. January 1916. pp. 695–702 – via Google Books.
