= Francis D. Rauber =

United States Marine (1901–1991)

Francis Drury Rauber
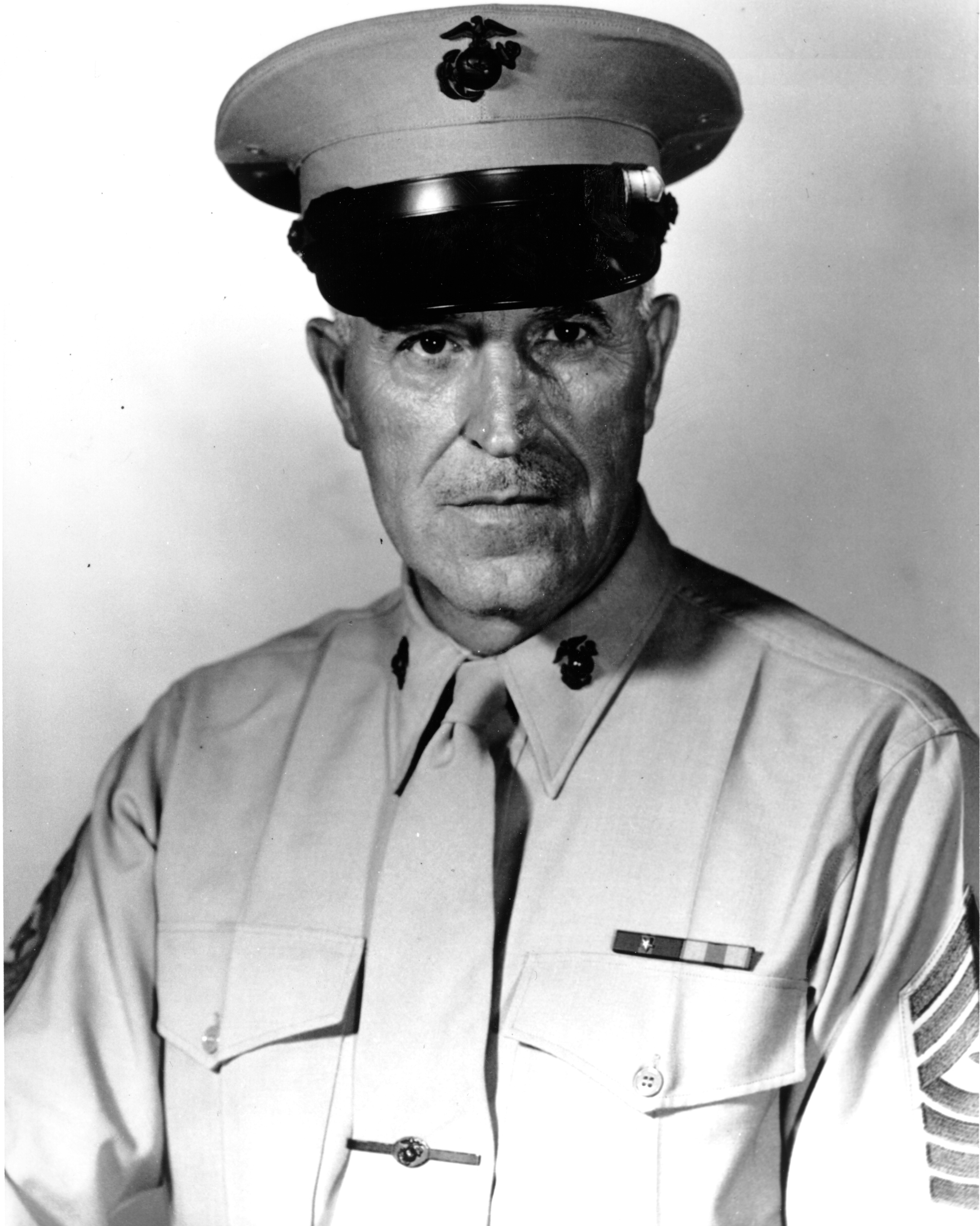
- Sergeant Major Francis D. Rauber c. 1959
- Born: 10 July 1901; Rochester, New York, U.S.
- Died: 19 February 1991 (aged 89); Sun City, California, U.S.
- Military career
- Allegiance: United States
- Branch: United States Marine Corps (1921–26, 1942–62); National Guard (1918–20)
- Service years: 1918–1920; 1921–1926; 1942–1962
- Rank: Sergeant Major
- Commands: Sergeant Major of the Marine Corps
- Conflicts: World War II

Francis Drury Rauber (10 July 1901 – 19 February 1991) was a United States Marine who served as the 2nd Sergeant Major of the Marine Corps from 1 September 1959 until his retirement from active duty on 28 June 1962.

== Early life and career ==
Born 10 July 1901 in Rochester, New York, Rauber graduated from high school there in 1918, then saw two years active duty in the National Guard. He began his first enlistment in the Marine Corps on 9 December 1921, rising to the rank of Sergeant prior to his honorable discharge in February 1926. During this time, he attended recruit training at Parris Island, South Carolina, then was assigned to the 1st Marine Brigade at Port-au-Prince, Haiti; the 5th Marine Regiment, Marine Expeditionary Force, the forerunner of the Fleet Marine Force; the Marine Barracks, Norfolk, Virginia; and the 29th Company, 4th Regiment, Marine Corps Base, San Diego.

== Military career ==
Upon the outbreak of World War II, Rauber again offered his services to the Marine Corps, and on 1 May 1942, reenlisted and was re-appointed to the rank of sergeant. In January 1943, he completed First Sergeant's School at the Philadelphia Navy Yard.

Rauber's service in the rank of sergeant major dates from February 1943 when he was named Post Sergeant Major at the New York Naval Shipyard, Brooklyn, and Sergeant Major of the 3rd Marine Corps Reserve District.

In March 1948, Rauber was transferred to the West Coast for assignment to Fleet Marine Force, Pacific as Sergeant Major with the 9th Marines, 1st Provisional Marine Brigade. Arriving in Guam, Mariana Islands in May 1948, he served in this capacity until November, and in Tsingtao and Shanghai China until April 1949, when he returned to Camp Witek, Guam.

In March 1950, Rauber embarked for the United States for a brief assignment as Sergeant Major, Inspector-Instructor Staff, 19th Infantry Battalion, Rochester, New York. Ordered to Cherry Point, North Carolina in January 1951, he served consecutively as Squadron and Group Sergeant Major with MCGIS-5 and MACG-1, 2nd Marine Aircraft Wing. In March 1952, he joined the Marine Corps Air Station, Miami, Florida as Operations Squadron 3 Sergeant Major, becoming Headquarters Sergeant Major in June 1953.

Transferred to Washington, D.C. in April 1954, Rauber began a four-year tour of duty as Sergeant Major of the Personnel Department, Headquarters Marine Corps. In May 1958, upon being transferred to Pearl Harbor, Hawaii, he became Sergeant Major of Fleet Marine Force, Pacific. Following this assignment, he returned to Headquarters Marine Corps and in September 1959 assumed the Marine Corps top enlisted billet as Sergeant Major of the Marine Corps.

== Awards ==
Rauber's military decorations include:

Marine Corps Good Conduct Medal w/ 6 service stars		Marine Corps Expeditionary Medal	
China Service Medal	American Campaign Medal	World War II Victory Medal	National Defense Service Medal w/ service star

Military offices
Preceded by Wilbur Bestwick	Sergeant Major of the Marine Corps; 1959–1962	Succeeded by Thomas J. McHugh
