= Herbert J. Sweet =

United States Marine Corps officer (1919–1998)

Herbert Joseph Sweet
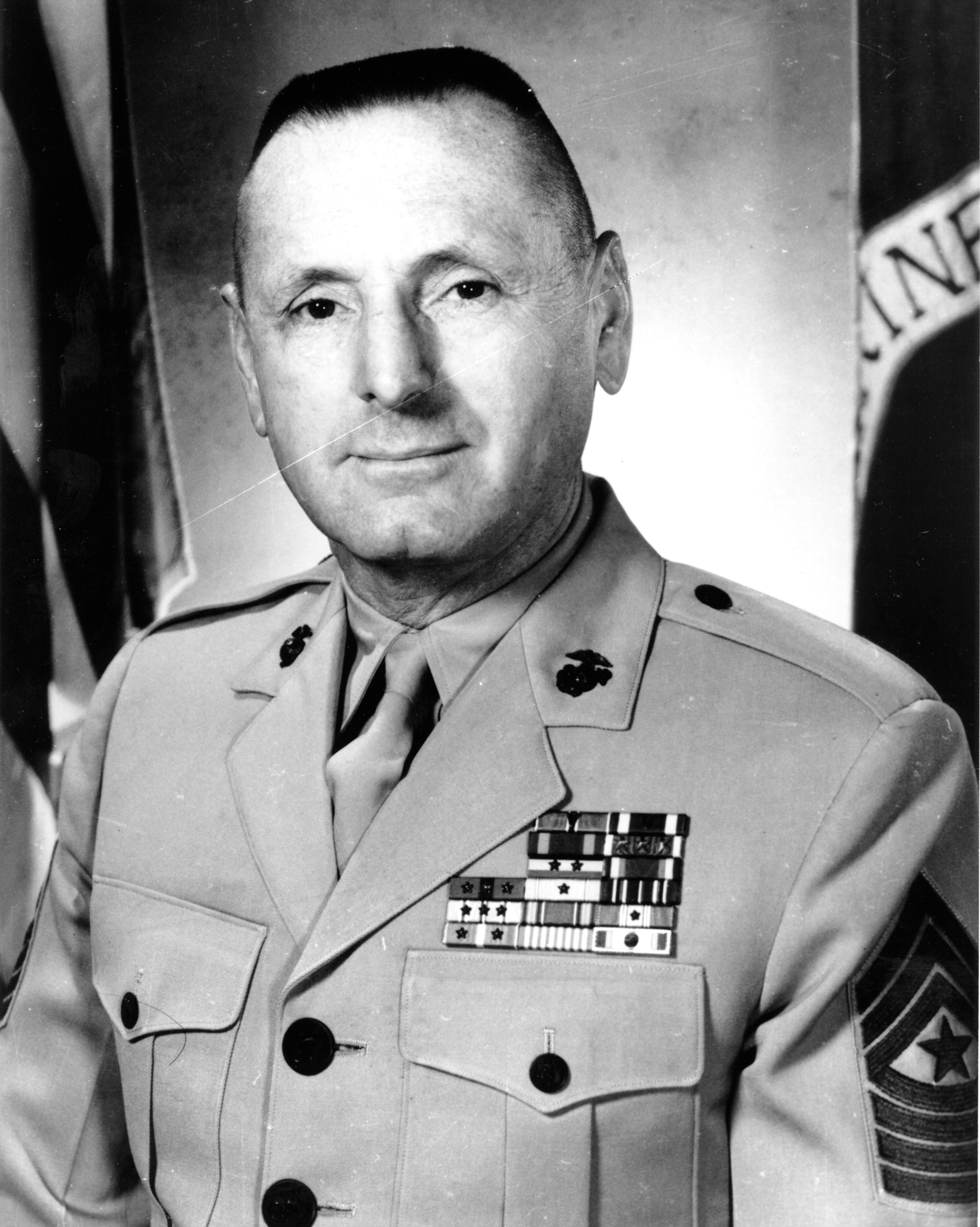
- Sergeant Major Herbert J. Sweet c. 1965
- Born: October 8, 1919; Hartford, Connecticut, U.S.
- Died: June 18, 1998 (aged 78); Arlington, Virginia, U.S.
- Military career
- Allegiance: United States
- Branch: United States Marine Corps
- Service years: 1937–1969
- Rank: Sergeant major
- Commands: Sergeant Major of the Marine Corps
- Conflicts: World War II: Battle of Bougainville; Battle of Guam; Battle of Iwo Jima; Korean War
- Awards: Legion of Merit; Bronze Star Medal; Purple Heart (4); Navy and Marine Corps Commendation Medal; Navy and Marine Corps Achievement Medal

Herbert Joseph Sweet (October 8, 1919 – June 18, 1998) was a United States Marine who served as the 4th Sergeant Major of the Marine Corps. He fought and was wounded in World War II and the Korean War.

== Early life ==
Herbert Sweet was born on October 8, 1919, in Hartford, Connecticut; the following year his family moved to Troy, New York, where he grew up and received his schooling. As a child, Sweet made his home with his uncle, Harold J. Nash.

== Military career ==
Sweet enlisted in the United States Marine Corps on February 26, 1937. Following recruit training at Marine Corps Recruit Depot Parris Island, he saw duty with Marine detachments at Quantico, Virginia, the 1939 World's Fair in New York City, and in Trinidad.

Throughout World War II, Sweet served with the 21st Marine Regiment and the 3rd Marine Division, moving with the unit to New Zealand and Guadalcanal for training. He saw combat at the Battle of Bougainville, where he served as a platoon sergeant and was promoted to gunnery sergeant. He was wounded in action during the landing on Guam in July 1944 and, following hospitalization, rejoined the 21st Marines for the Battle of Iwo Jima. There, he earned the Bronze Star Medal with valor device for exposing himself to enemy fire in order to rescue his wounded company commander, two other Marines and a corpsman. He was wounded and evacuated twice.

On his return to active duty, Sweet served as first sergeant of the 4th Recruit Training Battalion at Parris Island; on the Marine detachment at the Naval Ordnance Plant, Macon, Georgia; and on the Marine Detachment aboard USS Missouri (BB-63). He also served two separate tours at Marine Corps Base Camp Lejeune, first as an infantry chief, and following the Korean War, as regimental sergeant major of the 2nd Marine Regiment and field sergeant major of the 2nd Marine Division, respectively. He requested duty in Korea on the outbreak of hostilities there, and in 1951 saw combat as rifle company first sergeant with the 5th Marine Regiment. He was wounded in action that October and earned the Navy Commendation Medal with valor device.

Sweet returned from Korea in July 1952, and served thereafter as assistant to the professor of naval science, NROTC Unit at Columbia University in New York City for two years. Following his second tour of duty at Camp Lejeune, he was stationed in the Philippine Islands as barracks sergeant major, Subic Bay, from 1958 to 1960. Then he served as sergeant major of the 6th Marine Corps Reserve and Recruitment District at Atlanta, Georgia. In July 1964 he was named sergeant major for the 3rd Marine Division (Fleet Marine Force in the Far East). While serving in this capacity, he was selected as the 4th Sergeant Major of the Marine Corps by a board convened in Washington; he assumed his new post on July 16, 1965.

== Later life ==
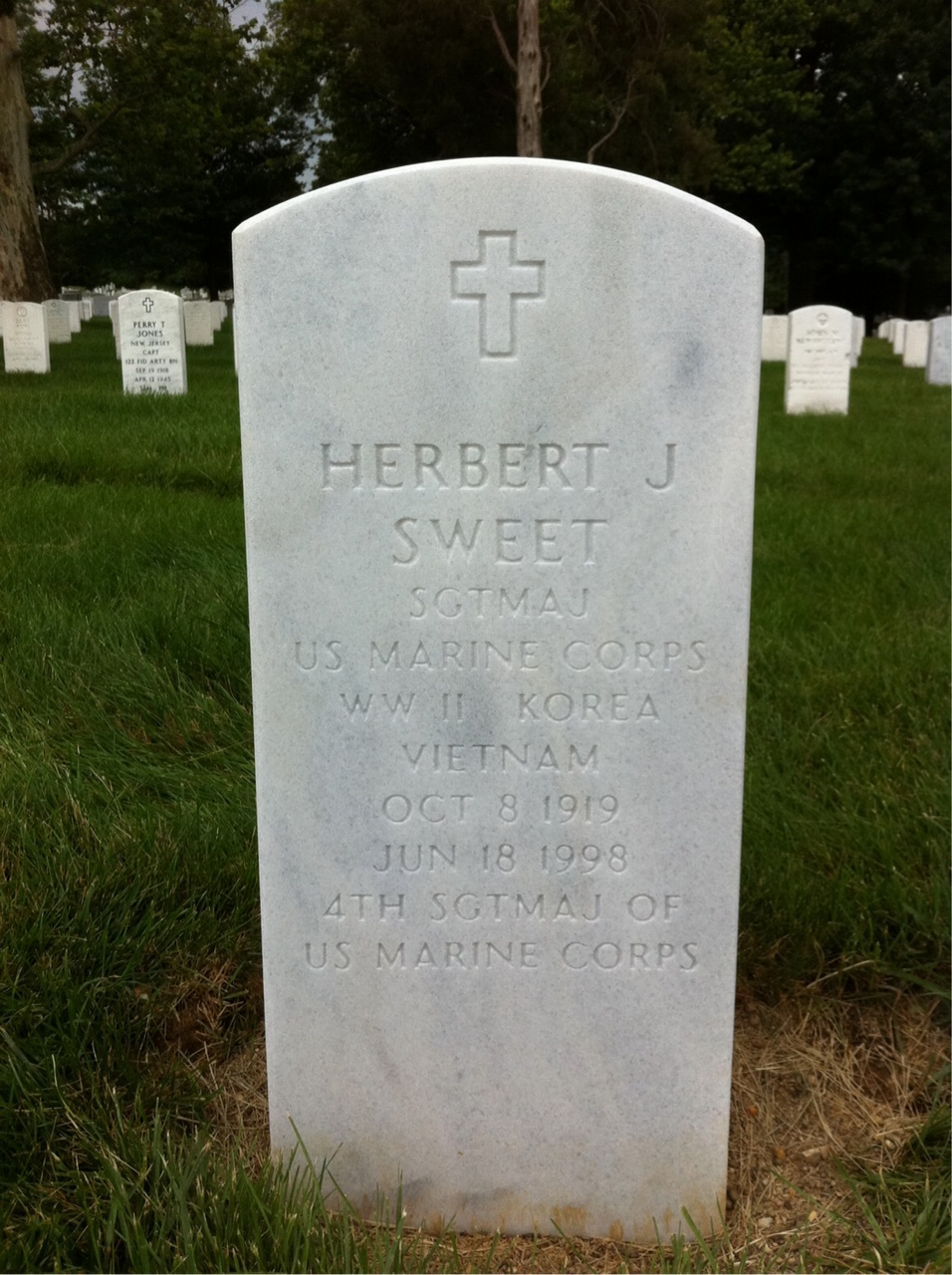
Grave at Arlington National Cemetery

Sweet died June 18, 1998, of respiratory failure at his home in Alexandria, Virginia. He was buried with full military honors at Arlington National Cemetery.

== Awards and decorations ==
Sweet's military decorations include:

Legion of Merit		Bronze Star w/ valor device	
Purple Heart w/ 3 award stars	Navy and Marine Corps Commendation Medal w/ valor device	Navy and Marine Corps Achievement Medal	Combat Action Ribbon
Navy Presidential Unit Citation w/ 3 service stars	Navy Unit Commendation	Marine Corps Good Conduct Medal w/ 9 service stars	American Defense Service Medal w/ 1 clasp
American Campaign Medal	Asiatic-Pacific Campaign Medal w/ 3 service stars	World War II Victory Medal	National Defense Service Medal w/ 1 service star
Korean Service Medal w/ 2 service stars	Korean Presidential Unit Citation	United Nations Korea Medal	Korean War Service Medal

Military offices
Preceded by Thomas J. McHugh	Sergeant Major of the Marine Corps; 1965–1969	Succeeded by Joseph W. Dailey
