= Joseph W. Dailey =

5th Sergeant Major of the Marine Corps

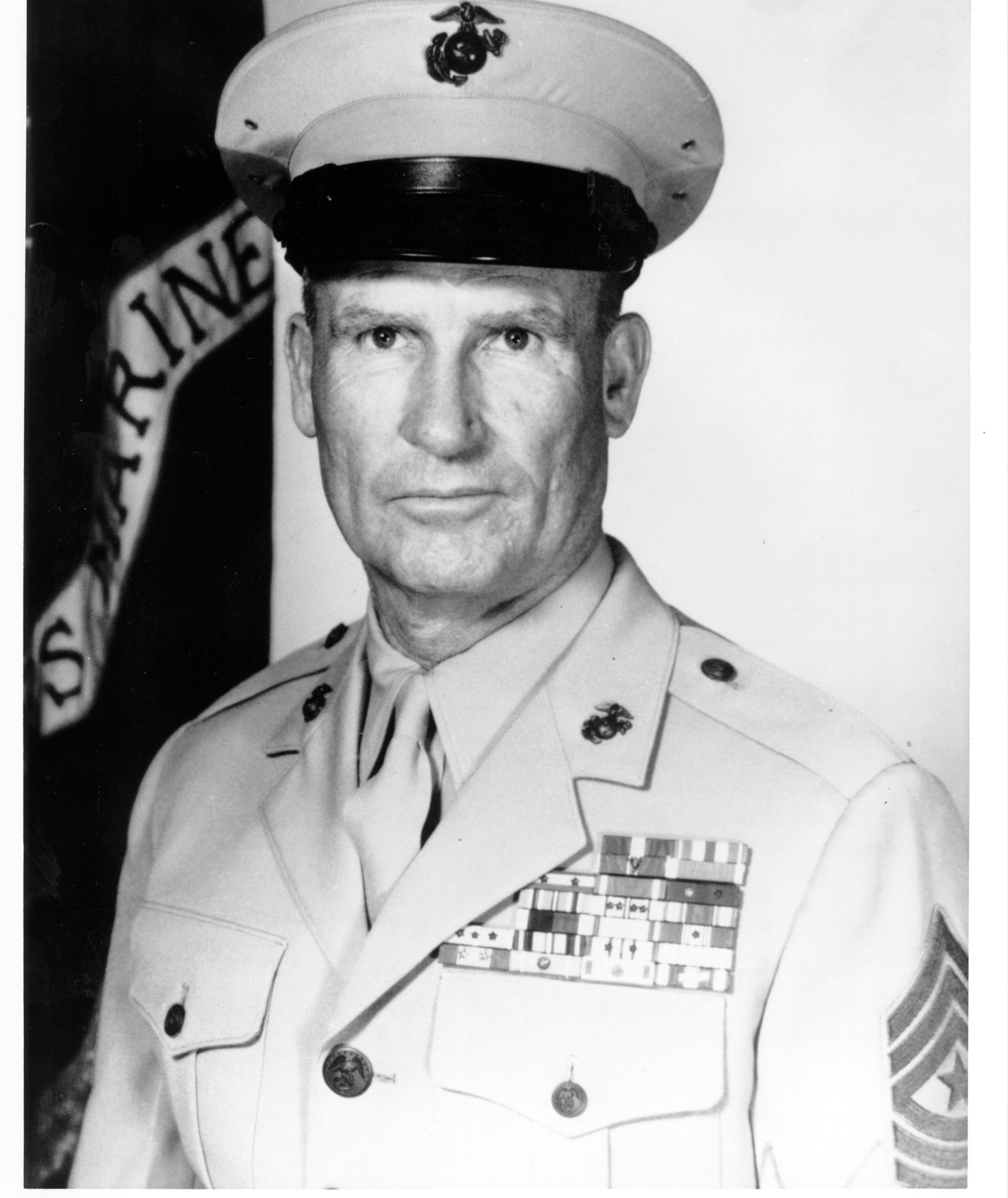
- Sergeant Major Joseph W. Dailey c. 1969
- Born: February 17, 1917; Black Mountain, Arkansas, U.S.
- Died: July 5, 2007 (aged 90); Newport Beach, California, U.S.
- Military career
- Allegiance: United States
- Branch: United States Marine Corps
- Service years: 1941–1945; 1948–1973
- Rank: Sergeant major
- Commands: Sergeant Major of the Marine Corps
- Conflicts: World War II: New Guinea campaign; Battle of the Bismarck Sea; Battle of Okinawa; Korean War; Vietnam War
- Awards: Navy Cross; Silver Star; Legion of Merit; Bronze Star Medal with Combat V Purple Heart; Navy and Marine Corps Commendation Medal

Joseph W. Dailey (February 17, 1917 – July 5, 2007) was a United States Marine who served as the 5th sergeant major of the Marine Corps from August 1, 1969, until he retired from active duty on January 31, 1973. Dailey was the oldest living former sergeant major of the Marine Corps when he died in 2007. Dailey served in combat in three wars—World War II, the Korean War, and the Vietnam War—earning the Silver Star for actions during the Battle of Okinawa and the Navy Cross and the Bronze Star Medal for heroism in Korea. He was a member of the Church of Jesus Christ of Latter-day Saints.

== Early life ==
Born February 17, 1917, in Black Mountain, Arkansas, Dailey enlisted in the United States Marine Corps Reserve in 1941 at Portland, Oregon, and underwent recruit training at Marine Corps Recruit Depot San Diego in California.

== Military career ==
During World War II, Dailey served with the 1st Battalion, 1st Marines, 1st Marine Division, and participated in combat operations in Eastern New Guinea; Bismarck Archipelago; Western Caroline Islands and on Okinawa. He was awarded the Silver Star for conspicuous gallantry in action against the enemy while serving as acting gunnery sergeant of Company A, 1st Battalion, 1st Marines on Okinawa on May 3, 1945.

Upon his return to the United States, Dailey was discharged from the Marine Corps Reserve on November 23, 1945. On June 18, 1948, he re-enlisted in the Marine Corps Reserve, and was promoted to the rank of staff sergeant. He remained inactive until October 1950, when ordered to active duty at the Marine Corps Base, Camp Pendleton in California, where he served as a company first sergeant with the 4th Infantry Training Battalion. He was promoted to technical sergeant in August 1951.

In October 1952, Dailey joined the 1st Marine Division in Korea, where he earned the Navy Cross for extraordinary heroism while serving as platoon leader with Company F, 2nd Battalion, 5th Marines, 1st Marine Division on February 25, 1953; the Bronze Star Medal with Combat "V" and the Purple Heart for wounds received on March 26, 1953, while serving as company gunnery sergeant with Company F. Dailey integrated into the Regular Marine Corps in 1953 and was promoted to master sergeant in August 1953.

Following his return to the United States in December 1953, Dailey was again assigned to the Marine Corps Recruit Depot in San Diego, and served, successively, as company first sergeant and company gunnery sergeant with Communications-Electronics Schools Battalion. From July 1955 until November 1956, he served as the first sergeant with the Marine Detachment, USS Bremerton. He next became battalion sergeant major of the 3rd Battalion, 7th Marines, 1st Marine Division, Camp Pendleton, through June 1959. He was promoted to first sergeant on December 30, 1955, and to sergeant major on December 31, 1955.

Dailey reported to Houston, Texas, where he was assigned duty as sergeant major on the Inspector-Instructor Staff, 1st Battalion, 23rd Marine Regiment, 4th Marine Division serving in that capacity until July 1962. Ordered to the Marine Corps Base, Camp Lejeune, North Carolina, he saw duty as regimental sergeant major with the 2nd Marines, 2nd Marine Division. He deployed with the 2nd Marines during the Cuban contingency operations.

In August 1963, Dailey reported to Headquarters Marine Corps in Washington, D.C., for duty as G-3 Division sergeant major until May 1964. For the next two years, he served as post sergeant major at Marine Barracks, Washington, D.C.

Detached in July 1966, Dailey arrived in the Republic of Vietnam the following month, where he became battalion sergeant major, 2nd Battalion, 1st Marines, 1st Marine Division. In November 1966, he was medically evacuated from Vietnam as a result of injuries sustained in a vehicle accident. In July 1968, he returned to the Republic of Vietnam, where he served as battalion sergeant major of the 11th Engineer Battalion, 3rd Marine Division, III Marine Amphibious Force until November of that year. He then served as the 3rd Marine Division sergeant major until July 1969. He earned the Navy Commendation Medal with Combat "V" for his service during the latter tour.

== Later life ==
Dailey died in Newport Beach, California, on July 5, 2007, at age 90. He is survived by his wife, two daughters, fourteen grandchildren and 8 great-grandchildren.

== Awards and decorations ==
Dailey's military decorations include:

1st Row	Navy Cross			
2nd Row	Silver Star	Legion of Merit	Bronze Star w/ valor device	Purple Heart
3rd Row	Navy and Marine Corps Commendation Medal w/ valor device	Combat Action Ribbon	Navy Presidential Unit Citation w/ 2 bronze service stars	Navy Unit Commendation
4th Row	Marine Corps Good Conduct Medal w/ 7 service stars	Marine Corps Expeditionary Medal	China Service Medal	American Campaign Medal
5th Row	Asiatic-Pacific Campaign Medal w/ 4 service stars	World War II Victory Medal	Navy Occupation Service Medal	National Defense Service Medal w/ 1 service star
6th Row	Korean Service Medal w/ 3 service stars	Armed Forces Expeditionary Medal	Vietnam Service Medal w/ silver service star	Order of National Security Merit, Gwangbog Medal w/ bronze star
7th Row	Vietnam Gallantry Cross w/ palm and 2 bronze stars	Vietnam Armed Forces Honor Medal, 2nd class	Vietnam Staff Service Medal, 2nd class	Korean Presidential Unit Citation
8th Row	Vietnam Gallantry Cross Unit Citation	United Nations Korea Medal	Vietnam Campaign Medal	Korean War Service Medal

=== Navy Cross citation ===
The Navy Cross is presented to Joseph W Dailey (335540), Technical Sergeant, U.S. Marine Corps (Reserve), for extraordinary heroism in connection with military operations against an armed enemy of the United Nations while serving as a Platoon Leader of Company F, Second Battalion, Fifth Marines, First Marine Division (Reinforced), in action against enemy aggressor forces in the Republic of Korea on 25 February 1953. While participating in a company raid on an enemy outpost, Technical Sergeant Dailey unhesitatingly volunteered to lead a rescue squad in an attempt to recover four Marine casualties who were discovered lying a few feet from a strongly fortified enemy-held trench. Moving quickly to his objective, he skillfully maneuvered his squad into a position from which he was able to rescue the casualties and, despite an intense hail of enemy machine-gun, grenade and automatic-weapons fire, carried out a further search of the surrounding terrain until he located and recovered two other wounded Marines. As an enemy force advanced toward his position, he skillfully withdrew his men and all the recovered casualties to friendly lines. By his exceptional courage, outstanding leadership and daring initiative in the face of continuous hostile fire, Technical Sergeant Dailey was directly instrumental in saving the lives of six wounded Marines and upheld the highest traditions of the United States Naval Service.

=== Silver Star citation ===
Citation:

The President of the United States of America takes pleasure in presenting the Silver Star to Sergeant Joseph W Dailey (MCSN: 335540), United States Marine Corps Reserve, for conspicuous gallantry and intrepidity while serving as Acting Gunnery Sergeant of Company A, First Battalion, First Marines, FIRST Marine Division, in action against enemy Japanese forces on Okinawa, Ryukyu Islands, on 3 May 1945. During an attack in which his company was suffering severe casualties, Platoon Sergeant Dailey skillfully organized the personnel of company headquarters and the mortar platoon into stretcher-bearer teams and led them into the fire-swept zone, constantly exposing himself to heavy fire in order to direct the evacuation of the wounded. Realizing that more stretchers were needed, he crossed the hazardous area and commandeered Marines from a reserve unit to aid his company and, leading them through lanes of enemy fire, succeeded in moving all the casualties to a comparatively safe position. By his leadership, initiative and untiring devotion to duty, Platoon Sergeant Bailey contributed materially to the success of the operation, and upheld the highest traditions of the United States Naval Service.

Military offices
Preceded by Herbert J. Sweet	Sergeant Major of the Marine Corps; 1969–1973	Succeeded by Clinton A. Puckett
