= Clinton A. Puckett =

6th Sergeant Major of the Marine Corps

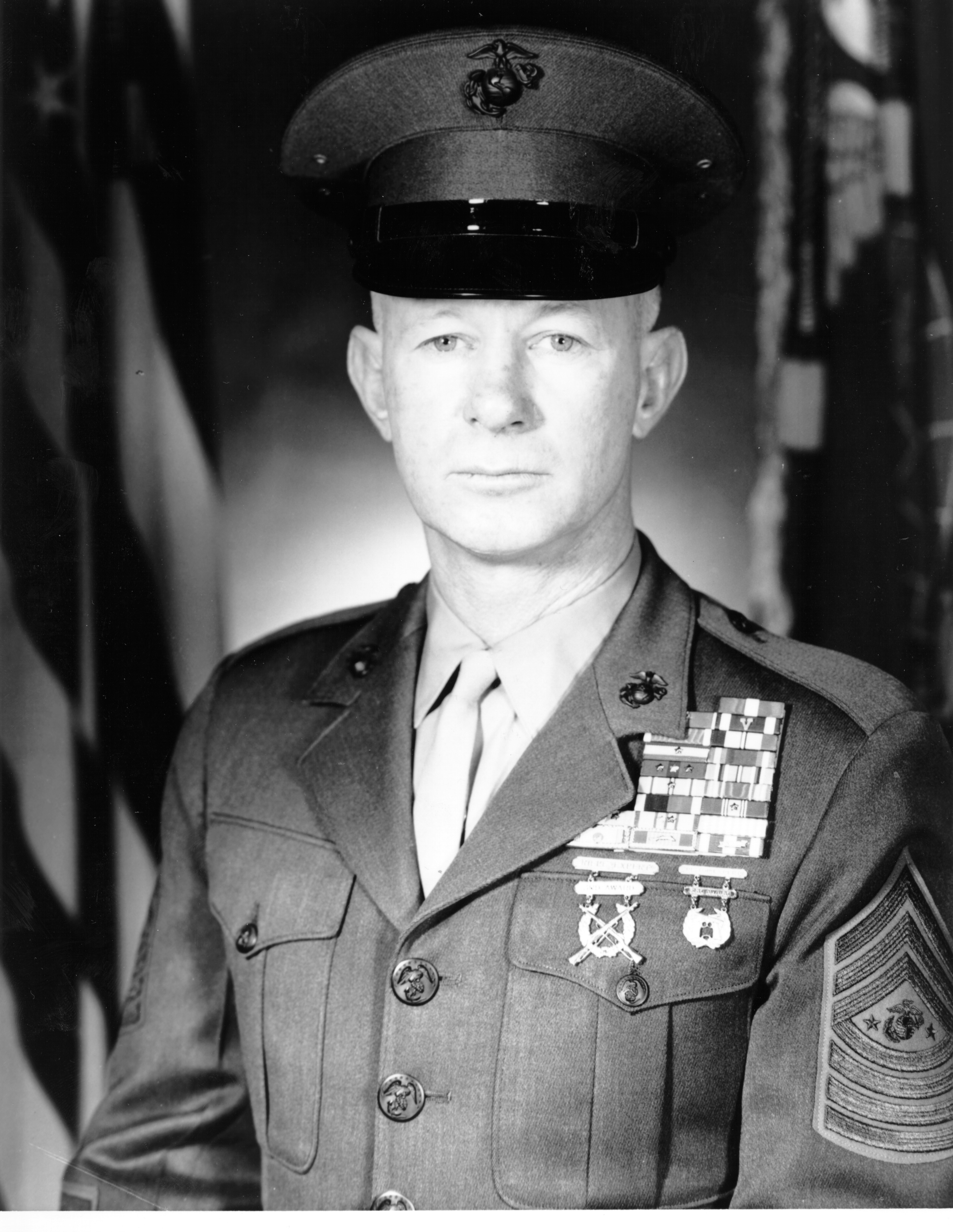
- Sergeant Major Clinton A. Puckett c. 1973
- Born: March 6, 1926; Waurika, Oklahoma, U.S.
- Died: September 3, 2002 (aged 76); Suquamish, Washington, U.S.
- Burial place: Arlington National Cemetery
- Military career
- Allegiance: United States
- Branch: United States Marine Corps
- Service years: 1944–1946; 1947–1975
- Rank: Sergeant major
- Commands: Sergeant Major of the Marine Corps
- Conflicts: World War II: Battle of Iwo Jima; Korean War: Battle of Pusan Perimeter; Battle of Inchon; Battle of Chosin Reservoir; Vietnam War: Operation Starlite; Operation Piranha
- Awards: Navy Cross; Legion of Merit; Bronze Star Medal; Purple Heart; Navy and Marine Corps Commendation Medal

Clinton A. Puckett (March 6, 1926 – September 3, 2002) was a United States Marine who served as the 6th Sergeant Major of the Marine Corps from February 1, 1973, until he retired from active duty on May 31, 1975. He served in World War II, the Korean War and the Vietnam War; receiving the Navy Cross for extraordinary heroism for actions in Korea. He was the last Sergeant Major of the Marine Corps to have served in World War II.

== Early life and career ==
Born on March 6, 1926, in Waurika, Oklahoma, Puckett grew up in Roswell, New Mexico. He joined the United States Marine Corps on 18 February 1944 at Santa Fe, New Mexico, and went through recruit training at Marine Corps Recruit Depot San Diego, California. Moving north, he joined the 5th Marine Division at Camp Pendleton. He trained with the division and as a rifleman and landed in the Battle of Iwo Jima on 19 February 1945. Puckett later witnessed the famous flag raising on Mount Suribachi on 23 February 1945. Following the Iwo campaign, he was sent back to Camp Pendleton where he served as a military policeman until his discharge in 1946.

== Military career ==
Puckett returned to the Marine Corps in July 1947, and was returned to San Diego. In late 1947, he received orders to sea duty and spent two and a half years aboard the cruiser USS Columbus. He was promoted to corporal in May 1948, then returned to San Diego where he served as a drill instructor until 1951.

As a sergeant, Puckett was ordered to Korea with Company G, 3rd Battalion 5th Marines and was promoted to staff sergeant in October 1951. While on patrol in June 1952, he was awarded the Navy Cross for extraordinary heroism against a vastly superior enemy force. His patrol, operating well forward of a friendly outpost, was pinned down by the enemy. Puckett covered the withdrawal of his men with submachine gun fire, despite being wounded in the left hand. Upon returning to the outpost, he discovered that three of his men were missing, and organized a small rescue party. After a brief skirmish in hostile territory, they located the missing Marines, two of whom were seriously wounded, and returned them to safety.

Newly promoted to technical sergeant, Puckett, following a brief period of duty at Camp Pendleton, returned to San Diego to attend the newly established Drill Instructor School. He graduated first in his class and was retained by the school as an instructor. In July 1955, he returned to Korea, where he served as an advisor for the Korean Marine Corps until September 1956. He was promoted to master sergeant in October 1955. Returning to Camp Pendleton he was assigned as a company First Sergeant and later as regimental operations chief with the 2nd Infantry Training Regiment. During his tour there, he was promoted to first sergeant.

Puckett became the First Sergeant of Marine Barracks, Pearl Harbor in April 1959 and was promoted to sergeant major in February 1960. In May 1962, he returned to Camp Pendleton as Sergeant Major of the 1st Reconnaissance Battalion, 1st Marine Division and in April 1964 was assigned to the 3rd Battalion 5th Marines. He went to Vietnam with that battalion (redesignated the 1st Battalion 3rd Marines) in September 1965. Following a two-year tour on the Inspector-Instructor Staff, 3rd Battalion 23rd Marines, 4th Marine Division in San Bruno, California, he returned to duty in Vietnam, serving as the Sergeant Major of the 7th Marines.

Puckett was reassigned to Camp H. M. Smith, Hawaii, in September 1969 and served there until July 1970 when he was ordered to duty at Headquarters Marine Corps. He had been the Personnel Sergeant Major of the Marine Corps until he assumed duties as Sergeant Major of the Marine Corps on 1 February 1973. He retired from the Marine Corps on May 31, 1975.

== Later life ==
Puckett died on September 3, 2002, and was buried at Arlington National Cemetery.

== Awards and decorations ==
Puckett's military decorations include:

| 1st Row | Navy Cross | | | |
| 2nd Row | Legion of Merit | Bronze Star Medal | Purple Heart | Navy and Marine Corps Commendation Medal w/ valor device |
| 3rd Row | Combat Action Ribbon | Navy Presidential Unit Citation w/ 1 service star | Navy Unit Commendation | Marine Corps Good Conduct Medal w/ 7 service stars |
| 4th Row | American Campaign Medal | Asiatic-Pacific Campaign Medal w/ 1 service star | World War II Victory Medal | Navy Occupation Service Medal |
| 5th Row | National Defense Service Medal w/ 1 service star | Korean Service Medal w/ 3 service stars | Vietnam Service Medal w/ 6 service stars | Vietnam Gallantry Cross w/ palm |
| 6th Row | Korean Presidential Unit Citation | United Nations Korea Medal | Vietnam Campaign Medal | Korean War Service Medal |
| Badges | Rifle Expert Badge (several awards) | | Pistol Expert Badge (several awards) | |

=== Navy Cross citation ===
The Navy Cross is presented to Clinton A. Puckett (560129), Technical Sergeant, U.S. Marine Corps, for extraordinary heroism in connection with military operations against an armed enemy of the United Nations while serving as a Platoon Sergeant of Company G, Third Battalion, Fifth Marines, First Marine Division (Reinforced), in action against enemy aggressor forces in the Republic of Korea on the night of 21 June 1952. With his patrol unit occupying positions well forward of a friendly outpost when a vastly outnumbering enemy force suddenly pinned down the patrol by enveloping both flanks with small-arms and grenade fire, Staff Sergeant Puckett repeatedly exposed himself to the devastating fire in order to cover the withdrawal of his men. Employing a submachine gun to harass and throw the enemy off balance, he accounted for four enemy dead and, although wounded in the left hand by grenade fragments, continued to deliver accurate fire until the rear of the patrol had left the area. Upon returning to the outpost and discovering that three of his men were missing, Staff Sergeant Puckett organized a small rescue party and went back into hostile territory to search for his comrades. After a brief skirmish with the enemy, he located the three missing men, two of whom were seriously wounded in the legs, and assisted in returning them to the outpost. By his valiant leadership, inspiring fighting spirit and determined efforts in the face of heavy odds, Staff Sergeant Puckett was instrumental in saving several lives. His gallant actions were in keeping with the highest traditions of the United States Naval Service.

Military offices
| Preceded by Joseph W. Dailey | Sergeant Major of the Marine Corps; 1973–1975 | Succeeded by Henry H. Black |
