= Thomas J. McHugh =

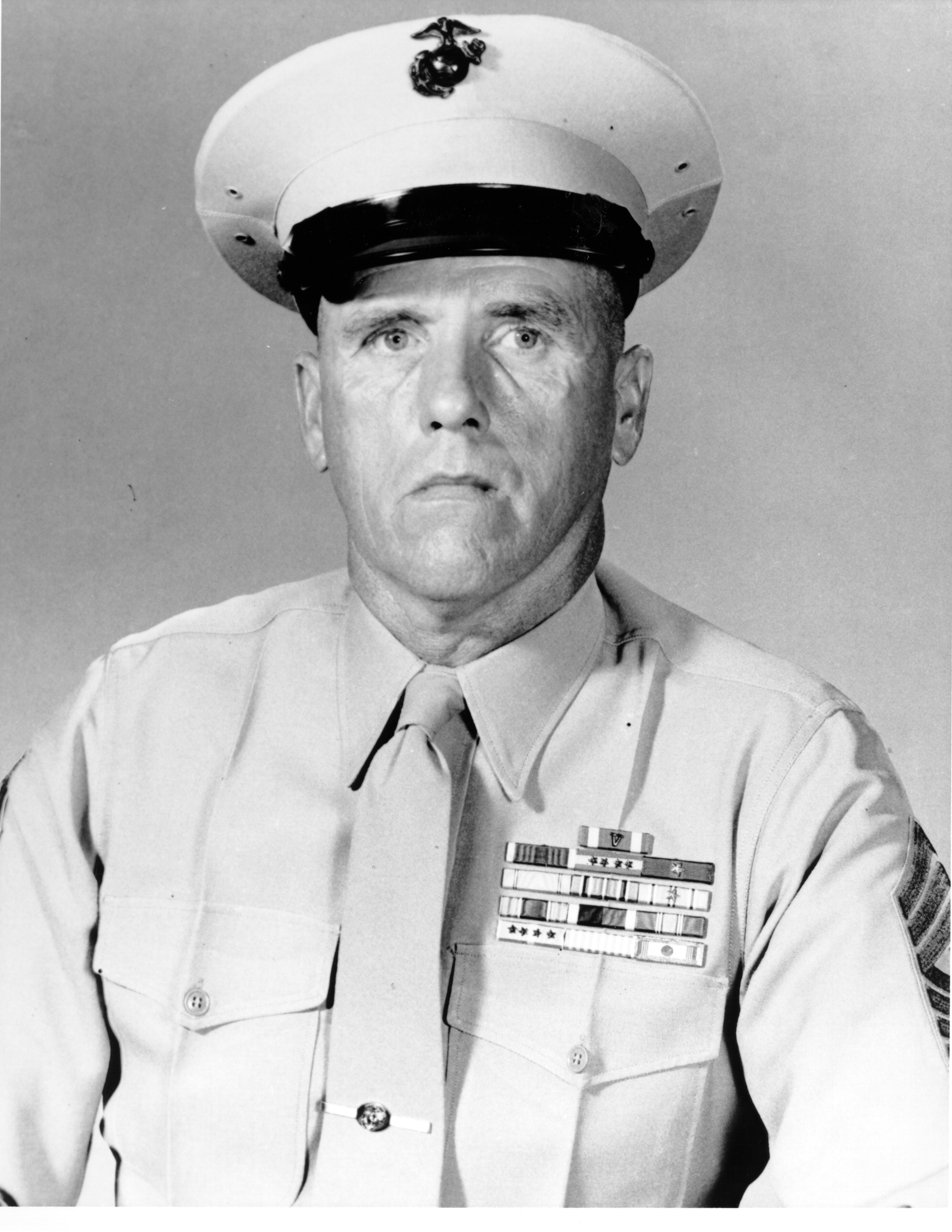
- Sergeant Major Thomas J. McHugh c. 1962
- Born: December 23, 1919; New York City, New York, U.S.
- Died: February 1, 2000 (aged 80); Jacksonville, North Carolina, U.S.
- Burial place: Coastal Carolina State Veterans Cemetery
- Military career
- Allegiance: United States
- Branch: United States Marine Corps
- Service years: 1938–1970
- Rank: Sergeant major
- Commands: Sergeant Major of the Marine Corps
- Conflicts: World War II: Battle of Guadalcanal; Battle of Cape Gloucester; Battle of Peleliu; Korean War: Battle of Pusan Perimeter; Battle of Inchon; Battle of Seoul; Battle of Chosin Reservoir; Vietnam War
- Awards: Purple Heart; Navy and Marine Corps Commendation Medal; Navy and Marine Corps Achievement Medal

Thomas John McHugh (December 23, 1919 – February 1, 2000) was a United States Marine who served as the 3rd Sergeant Major of the Marine Corps from June 29, 1962, to July 16, 1965.

== Early life ==
Thomas McHugh was born in New York City, the son of the late Peter and Bridget Porter McHugh, immigrants from Scotland and Ireland, respectively. He grew up in Philadelphia, Pennsylvania, where he received his education and enlisted in the Marine Corps Reserve on October 3, 1938.

== Military career ==
McHugh was called to extended active duty November 7, 1940, and integrated into the active Marine Corps in May 1943. Following his entry into service, McHugh served at the Philadelphia Navy Yard; the Marine Barracks, Quantico, Virginia; the Training Center, New River (later Camp Lejeune), North Carolina; and the Marine Corps Air Station Cherry Point, North Carolina.

=== World War II ===
Promoted to sergeant in March 1942, McHugh joined Company C, 1st Battalion 1st Marines and that June sailed aboard the USS Barnett from San Francisco for World War II. His unit was attached to the 1st Marine Division and took part in the Guadalcanal, Cape Gloucester and Peleliu campaigns. He rose to platoon sergeant and gunnery sergeant prior to his return to the United States in November 1944. He was awarded the Purple Heart for wounds suffered in the Peleliu operation.

On his return to the United States, McHugh served as Noncommissioned Officer-in-Charge of the Rifle Range, Marine Corps Air Station, Cherry Point. In July 1945, he was ordered back to Camp Lejeune where he served as company gunnery sergeant and company first sergeant for the Infantry Training Regiment, and later with the 1st Infantry Battalion of the 1st Special Marine Brigade and 2nd Battalion 8th Marines.

=== Interim and Korean War ===
McHugh was redesignated a technical sergeant in December 1946 and remained at Camp Lejeune until September 1948. McHugh transferred to the West Coast and embarked in November 1948 for Guam, where he joined the 5th Marines, 1st Provisional Marine Brigade, Fleet Marine Force, as company gunnery sergeant and company first sergeant.

Upon the outbreak of the Korean War, McHugh took part in combat operations with the 1st Marine Brigade and, subsequently, the 1st Marine Division as first sergeant, Company H, 3rd Battalion 5th Marines during the Battle of Pusan Perimeter, Battle of Inchon, Battle of Seoul, and Battle of Chosin Reservoir campaigns. He was promoted to master sergeant in Korea in December 1950, and returned to the United States in March 1951.

=== Senior appointments and Vietnam War ===
That summer McHugh was assigned briefly as assistant battalion sergeant major of the Officer Candidate Class Battalion, Special Training Regiment, Parris Island, South Carolina. In August 1951, he began a three-year tour of duty with the Naval Reserve Officer Training Corps unit at Yale University, serving as assistant Marine Officer Instructor and Noncommissioned Officer-in-Charge of Recruiting and enrolling candidates for the Officer Candidate Class and Platoon Leaders Class programs.

McHugh returned to Camp Lejeune in August 1954, and served briefly as acting sergeant major of the 2nd Combat Engineer Battalion before becoming Division Field Sergeant Major for the 2nd Marine Division. He was promoted to the rank of sergeant major on December 31, 1955.

In July 1957, McHugh again embarked for duty overseas at Marine Corps Air Station Kaneohe Bay in Hawaii. During his three years there, he served consecutively as sergeant major of the 1st Marine Brigade, 2nd Battalion 4th Marines, and 4th Marine Regiment.

In July 1960, McHugh was assigned as sergeant major of the Marine Corps Landing Force Development Center, Marine Corps Schools, at Quantico. The following May, he became sergeant major of Marine Corps Air Station Quantico. While serving in this capacity, he was selected for the corps top enlisted post, and assumed his new duties as Sergeant Major of the Marine Corps on June 29, 1962.

Following his tour as Sergeant Major of the Marine Corps, McHugh was ordered to Okinawa, Japan, for duty as sergeant major of Camp Smedley D. Butler, serving in that capacity until September 1966. Upon his return to the United States, he became sergeant major, Marine Corps Schools Quantico, later re-designated Marine Corps Development and Education Command. He transferred again to Camp Lejeune in May 1968, to serve as sergeant major of Force Troops, Fleet Marine Force, Atlantic until April 1969, when he was ordered to South Vietnam. In February 1970, he was transferred to Okinawa, Japan, and assumed his new duties as 1st Marine Aircraft Wing sergeant major until his retirement on December 1, 1970.

== Later life ==
McHugh died on February 21, 2000, at age 80, at Onslow Memorial Hospital, and is interred in the Coastal Carolina State Veterans Cemetery in Jacksonville, North Carolina.

== Awards and decorations ==
McHugh's military decorations include:

Purple Heart Medal	Navy and Marine Corps Commendation Medal w/ valor device		Navy and Marine Corps Achievement Medal
Navy Presidential Unit Citation w/ 4 service stars	Marine Corps Good Conduct Medal w/ 9 service stars	American Defense Service Medal	American Campaign Medal
Asiatic-Pacific Campaign Medal w/ 5 service stars	World War II Victory Medal	Navy Occupation Service Medal w/ Europe clasp	National Defense Service Medal w/ 1 service star
Korean Service Medal w/ 4 service stars	Vietnam Service Medal w/ 3 service stars	Vietnam Gallantry Cross w/ palm	Korean Presidential Unit Citation
Vietnam Civil Actions Unit Citation	United Nations Korea Medal	Vietnam Campaign Medal	Korean War Service Medal

Military offices
Preceded by Francis D. Rauber	Sergeant Major of the Marine Corps; 1962–1965	Succeeded by Herbert J. Sweet
