= Wilbur Bestwick =

US Marine Corps officer (1911–1972)

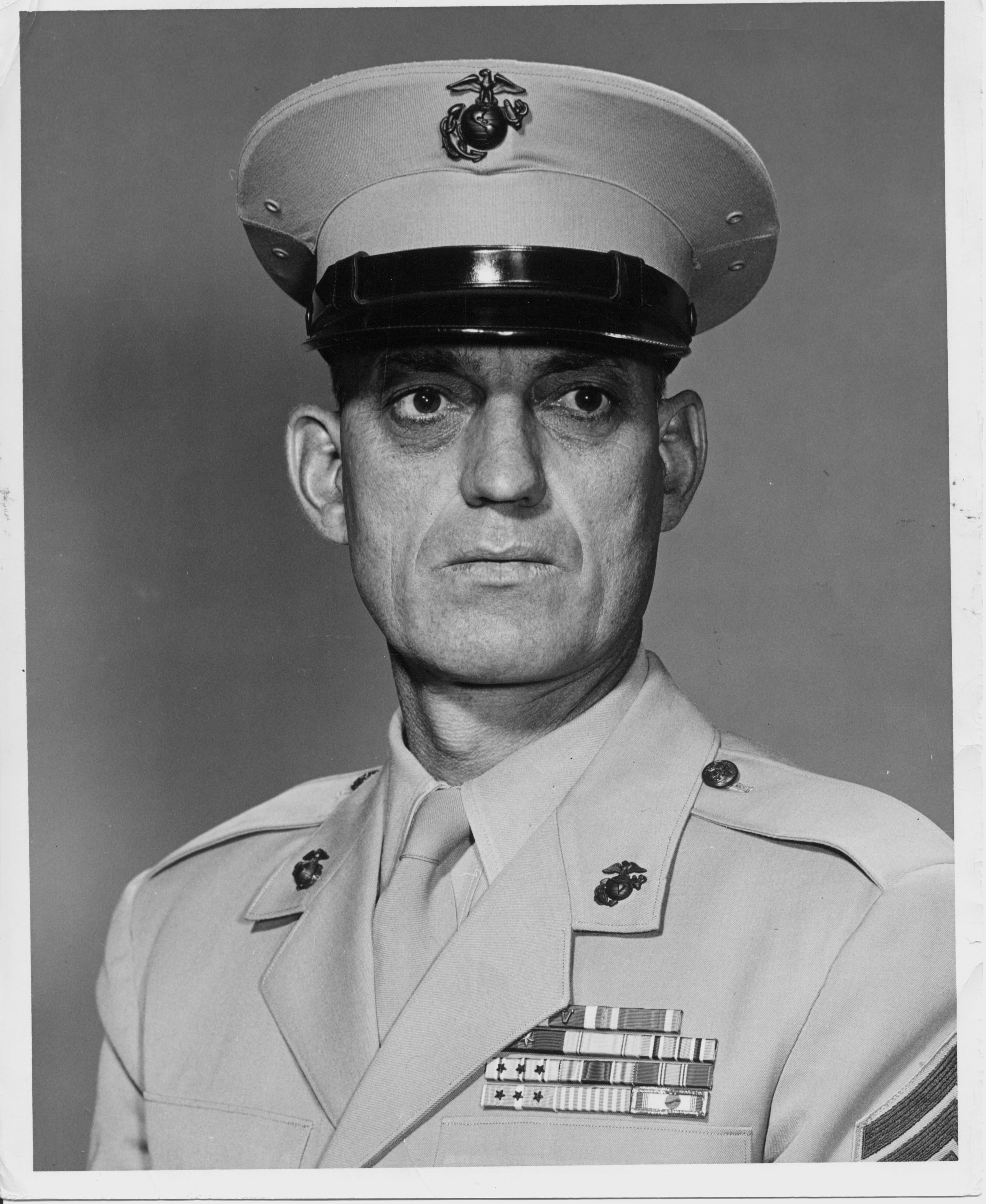
- Sergeant Major Wilbur Bestwick c. 1957
- Born: November 27, 1911; Sabetha, Kansas, U.S.
- Died: July 10, 1972 (aged 60); Palo Alto, California, U.S.
- Burial place: Skylawn Memorial Park
- Military career
- Allegiance: United States
- Branch: United States Marine Corps
- Service years: 1934–1959
- Rank: Sergeant major
- Commands: Sergeant Major of the Marine Corps
- Conflicts: World War II: Battle of Bougainville; Battle of Guam; Korean War
- Awards: Navy and Marine Corps Commendation Medal

Wilbur Bestwick (November 27, 1911 – July 10, 1972) was a United States Marine who served as the first Sergeant Major of the Marine Corps from 1957 to 1959.

== Early life ==
Bestwick was born on November 27, 1911, in Sabetha, Kansas, and graduated from high school there in 1932.

== Military career ==
Bestwick enlisted in the United States Marine Corps in 1934 and received his basic training at San Diego, California.

Bestwick saw pre-World War II duty at sea aboard the USS Louisville, and served at Marine posts in Bremerton, Washington; San Diego, and Camp Elliott, California. Appointed a sergeant major in 1943, he saw World War II combat with the 3rd Marine Division in the Bougainville and Guam campaigns.

On his return to the United States, in December 1944, Bestwick served as sergeant major of the Mare Island (California) Shipyard. He was transferred to San Francisco in 1945 and completed a four-year tour of duty there as sergeant major of the Marine Corps Depot of Supplies. In 1949, he became sergeant major of the Marine Corps Recruit Depot Parris Island.

During the Korean War, Bestwick joined the 1st Marine Division in Korea in October 1952 as a division sergeant major, and after a year overseas returned to the States. For excellent service in Korea, he was awarded the Navy Commendation Medal with Combat "V". In 1954, he began a two-year assignment as a sergeant major, Inspector, and Instructor Staff, 1st Air Delivery Company, San Jose, California.

Transferred to Headquarters Marine Corps, Washington, D.C., in June 1956, Bestwick served as sergeant major to the Secretary of the General Staff until May 23, 1957, when he assumed the newly established post of Sergeant Major of the Marine Corps until he retired from active duty on September 1, 1959.

== Later life ==
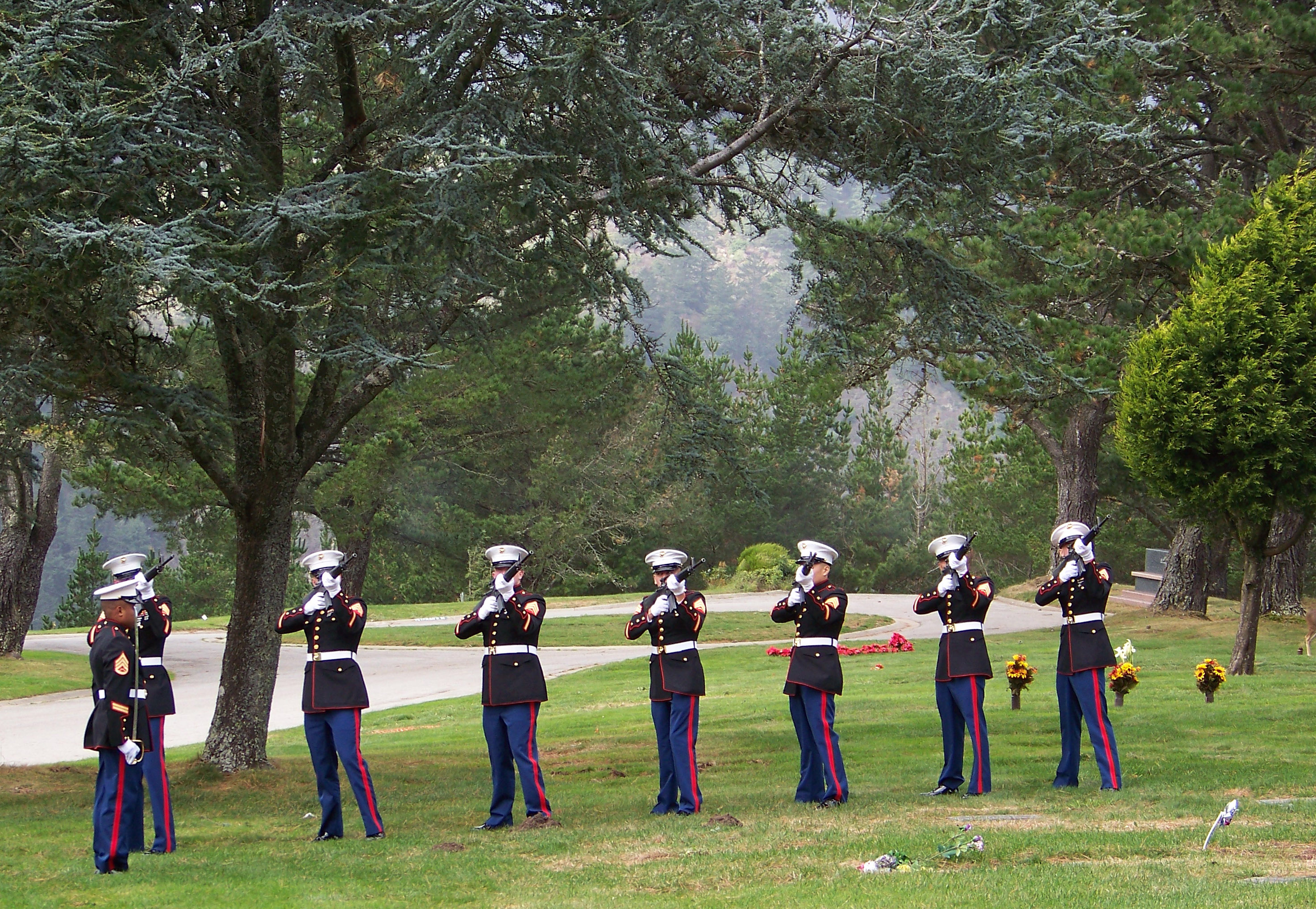
A rifle detail of Marines from Inspector-Instructor staff San Jose, Calif., fire a 21-gun salute in honor of the first Sergeant Major of the Marine Corps, Sgt. Maj. Wilbur Bestwick, at Skylawn Memorial Park Nov. 11, 2008

Bestwick worked at Varian Associates a number of years after his service in the Marine Corps.

Bestwick died July 10, 1972, at Stanford University Hospital and according to official records, was interred at the Alta Mesa Memorial Park in Palo Alto, California. However, this was later revealed to be a mistake, and he was found to have been buried at Skylawn Memorial Park in San Mateo, California.

== Awards ==
Bestwick's military decorations include:

Navy and Marine Corps Commendation Medal w/ valor device	Navy Unit Commendation	Marine Corps Good Conduct Medal w/ 7 service stars	American Defense Service Medal
American Campaign Medal	Asiatic-Pacific Campaign Medal w/ 4 service stars	World War II Victory Medal	National Defense Service Medal
Korean Service Medal w/ 3 service stars	Korean Presidential Unit Citation	United Nations Korea Medal	Republic of Korea War Service Medal

Military offices
New office	Sergeant Major of the Marine Corps; 1957–1959	Succeeded by Francis D. Rauber
