= Skylawn Memorial Park (San Mateo, California) =

Cemetery in San Mateo, California

- Interactive map of Skylawn Memorial Park

Details
- Established: 1959; 67 years ago
- Location: Hwy 92 West; San Mateo, California
- Country: United States
- Coordinates: 37°30′03″N 122°22′20″W
- Website: skylawnmemorialpark.com
- Find a Grave: Skylawn Memorial Park
- The Political Graveyard: Skylawn Memorial Park

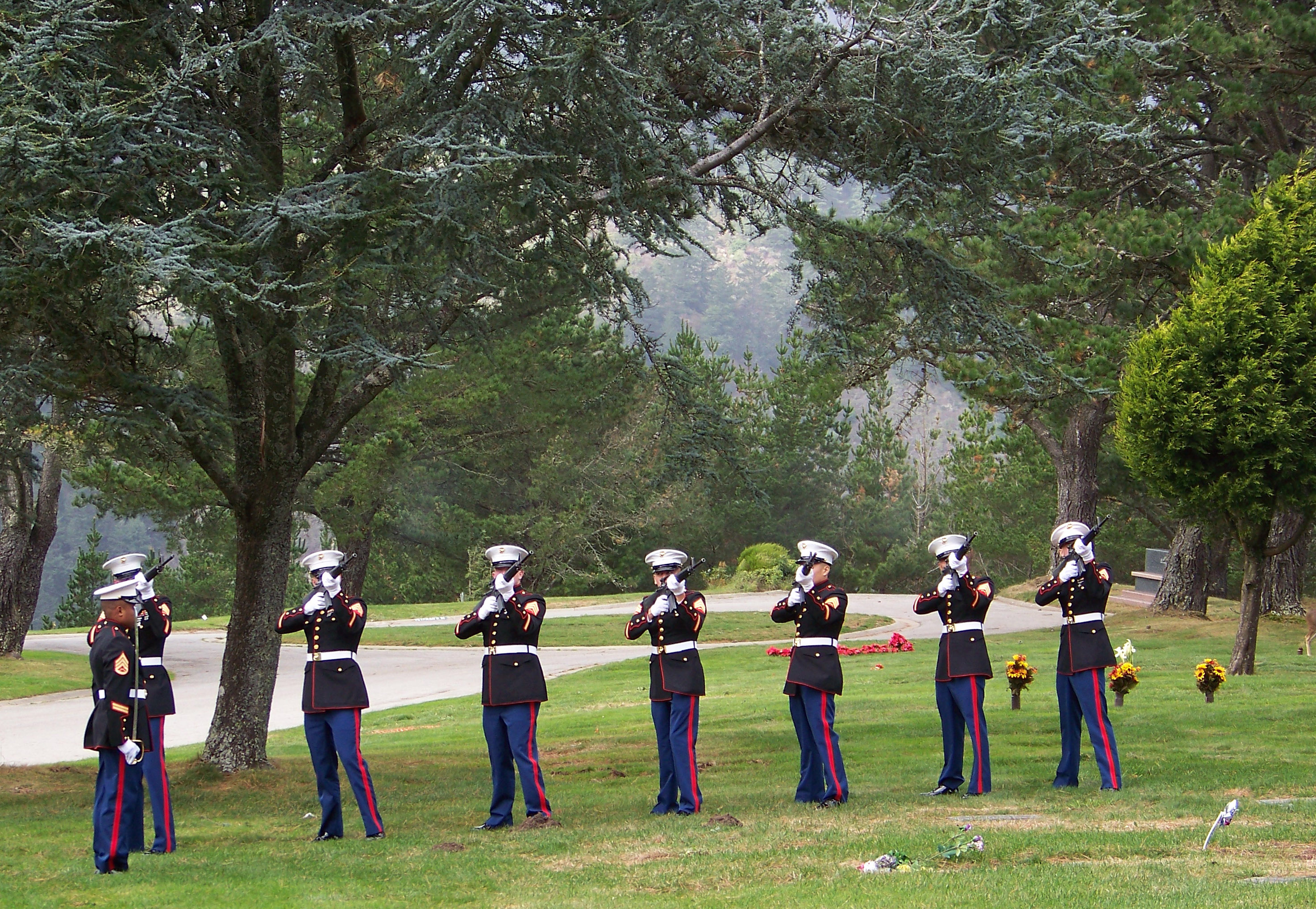
A rifle detail of Marines from Inspector-Instructor staff San Jose, Calif., fire a 21-gun salute in honor of the first Sergeant Major of the Marine Corps, Sgt. Maj. Wilbur Bestwick, at Skylawn Memorial Park Nov. 11, 2008

Skylawn Memorial Park is a 505-acre (204 ha) cemetery, mausoleum, crematorium, columbarium and funeral home complex in San Mateo, California, United States. Established in 1959, it is directly accessible from State Route 92. The park's owners, NorthStar Memorial Group, also operate the Chapel of the Chimes columbarium in Oakland, the Chapel of the Chimes memorial park in Hayward, and Sunset Lawn Chapel of the Chimes in Sacramento.

== Notable burials ==
- Tuineau Alipate (1967–2021), Professional football player
- Wilbur Bestwick (1911–1972), the first Sergeant Major of the Marine Corps
- Bahram Beyzaie (1938–2025), Iranian writer and filmmaker
- Bobby Lee Bonds (1946–2003), Major League Baseball right fielder, father of Barry Bonds
- Jim Davenport (1933–2016), Major League Baseball third baseman for the San Francisco Giants
- Samson De Brier (1909–1995), actor and author
- Chub Feeney (1921–1994), baseball executive; president of the National League
- Michael J. C. Gordon (1948-2017), computer scientist
- Robert Mellard (1919–1976), United States Army sergeant who fought in World War II and the Korean War
- Charles Miller (1862–1928), US Army officer who served as Commandant of the United States Army Command and General Staff College
- Glenn Morris (1912–1974), winner of the gold medal in the Olympic decathlon in 1936
- Edwin Arnold Panagabko (1934–1979), professional ice hockey player with the National Hockey League
- Glen Hearst Taylor (1904–1984), US Senator from Idaho, the vice presidential candidate on the Progressive Party ticket in the 1948 election
- Willard Lewis Waterman (1914–1995), character actor, played The Great Gildersleeve
- Bill Werle (1920–2010), Major League Baseball pitcher from Oakland
