= Carlos A. Ruiz =

US Marine Corps senior non-commissioned officer

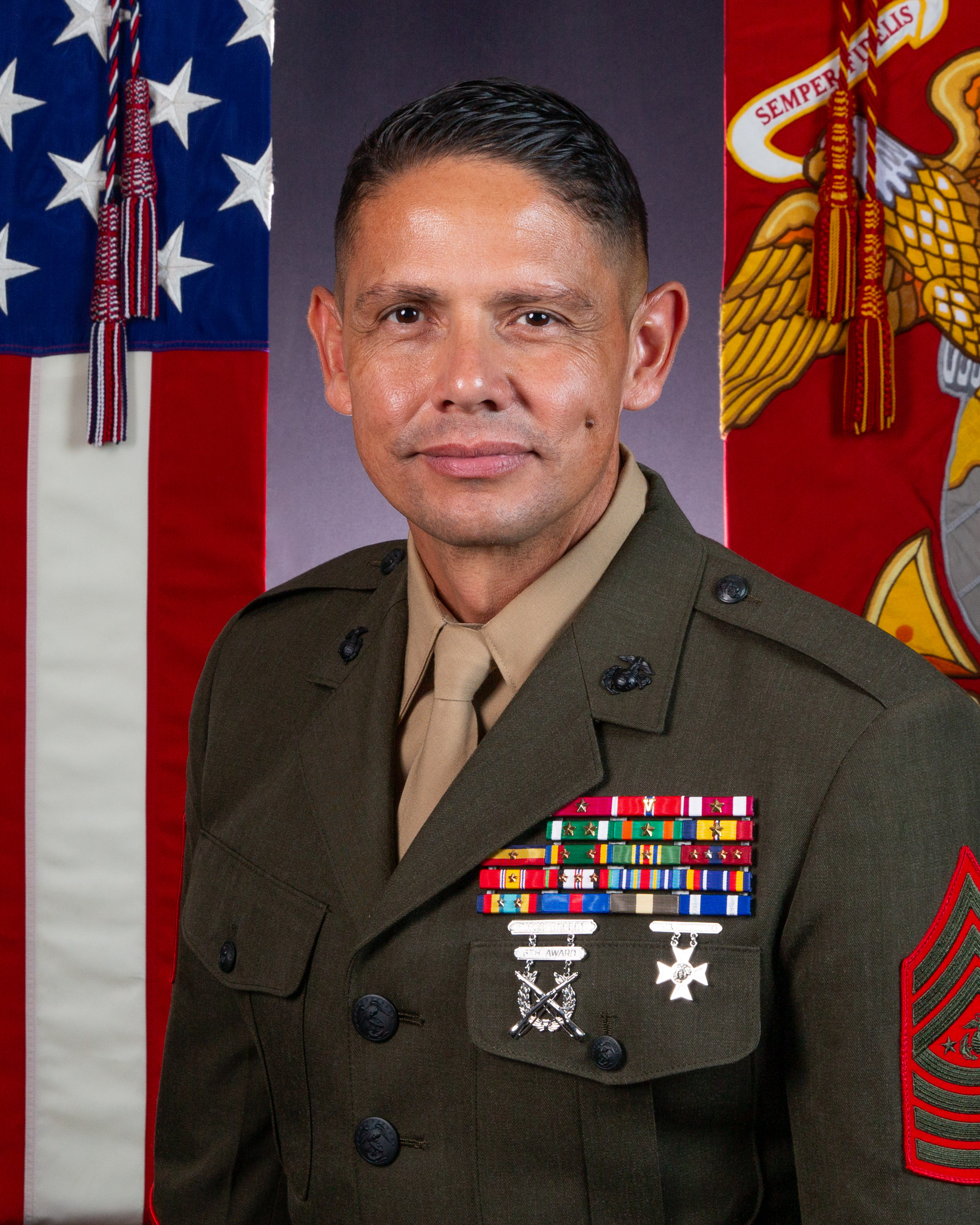
- Ruiz in August 2023
- Born: April 1975 (age 51); Sonora, Mexico
- Relatives: Married to Andrea M. Ruiz, USMC, MSgt (Ret.)
- Military career
- Allegiance: United States
- Branch: United States Marine Corps
- Service years: 1993–present
- Rank: Sergeant Major of the Marine Corps
- Units: Headquarters Marine Corps; United States Marine Corps Reserve; United States Marine Corps Forces, South; 4th Marine Logistics Group
- Conflicts: War in Afghanistan
- Awards: Legion of Merit (2); Bronze Star Medal

Carlos A. Ruiz (born April 1975) is a United States Marine who has served as the 20th Sergeant Major of the Marine Corps since August 10, 2023. He most recently served as the Command Senior Enlisted Leader of the United States Marine Corps Reserve and United States Marine Corps Forces, South.

Ruiz was initially selected for assignment as the command senior enlisted leader of the United States Space Command in December 2022. However, he was instead selected to be Sergeant Major of the Marine Corps.

== Awards and decorations ==

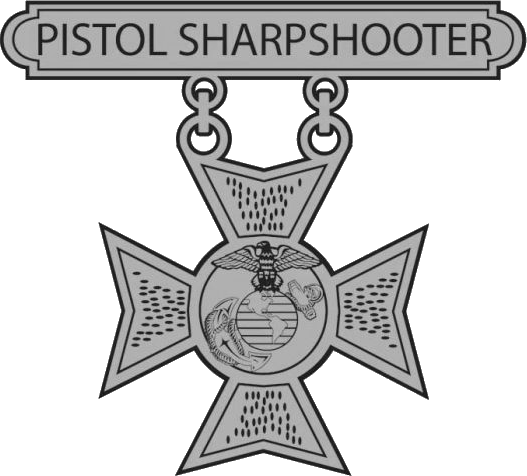

Legion of Merit with one gold award star		Bronze Star w/ Combat V	
Meritorious Service Medal w/ 1 award star	Navy and Marine Corps Commendation Medal w/ 2 award stars	Navy and Marine Corps Achievement Medal w/ 1 award star	Combat Action Ribbon w/ 1 award star
Navy & Marine Corps Presidential Unit Citation w/ 1 award star	Navy Unit Commendation w/ 2 bronze service stars	Navy Meritorious Unit Commendation w/ 1 service star	Marine Corps Good Conduct Medal w/ 8 service stars
National Defense Service Medal w/ 1 award star	Afghanistan Campaign Medal w/ 3 campaign stars	Global War on Terrorism Expeditionary Medal	Global War on Terrorism Service Medal
Navy Sea Service Deployment Ribbon w/ 6 service stars	Marine Corps Recruiting Service Ribbon	Marine Corps Drill Instructor Ribbon	NATO Medal for Service with ISAF
RIFLE EXPERT Badge		Pistol Sharpshooter marksmanship badge	

- 8 service stripes.

Military offices
Preceded by Troy E. Black	Sergeant Major of the Marine Corps; 2023–present	Incumbent
