= Croix de Guerre 1939–1945 =

French military decoration

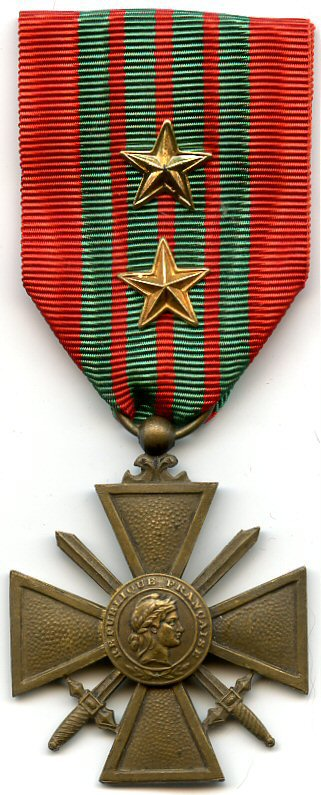
- Croix de Guerre 1939–1945 with 2 silver-gilt (gold) stars
- Type: Bravery award
- Awarded for: Military duty during World War II mentioned in dispatches
- Presented by: France
- Eligibility: Members of the French Armed Forces, foreign allied military personnel
- Clasps: silver-gilt palm silver palm bronze palm silver-gilt star silver star bronze star
- Status: No longer awarded
- Established: 26 September 1939
- First award: 1939
- Ribbon bar & streamer of the French Croix de guerre 1939–1945

Precedence
- Next (higher): Croix de guerre 1914–1918
- Next (lower): Croix de Guerre TOE

The Croix de Guerre 1939–1945 (English: War Cross 1939–1945) is a French military decoration, a version of the Croix de Guerre created on 26 September 1939 to honour people who fought with the Allies against the Axis forces at any time during World War II. After Germany invaded and overran mainland France in the Battle of France in May and June 1940, this Croix de Guerre was replaced by the pro-Axis Vichy French government with another Croix with a black-and-green ribbon, while the original was upheld by Free France. Since the triumph of the Free French side in World War II, this version is the only one officially recognized by the French government.

== Award statute ==
Due to the large extent of the war zone, recipients included those who fought during, with, at, or in the following:

- Battle of France
- French Forces of the Interior
- Free French Forces
- Western Front
- Middle East Theater
- Mediterranean Theater
- African campaigns

== Award description ==
=== Medal ===
The Croix de Guerre was designed by the sculptor Paul-Albert Bartholomé. The medal is 37 millimetres (1.5 in) in size and is in the shape of a Maltese cross with two swords criss-crossed through the center. In the center of the front is the profile of the French Republic crested by a Phrygian cap. Around this portrait, are the words République française ("French Republic"). On the reverse of the medal are the dates of the conflict : 1939–1940, 1939–1945, or simply 1940.

=== Ribbon ===
The suspension and service ribbon of the medal has a red background crossed with four green lines in its center.

==== Devices ====
On every medal and ribbon, there is at least one ribbon device, either in the shape of a palm or of a star, and fashioned from either bronze, silver, or silver-gilt (vermeil). The relative importance of the six possible combinations is detailed below. The total number of devices on a "Croix de Guerre" is not limited.

== Award grades ==
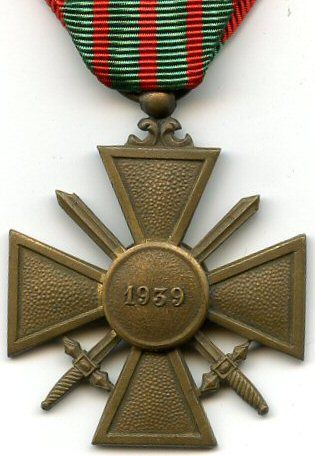
Reverse of the 1939–1945 War Cross

=== Mentioned in Despatches ===
The lowest degree is represented by a bronze star while the highest degree is represented by a bronze palm:

- Bronze star (étoile en bronze) for those who had been mentioned at the regiment or brigade level.
- Silver star (étoile en argent), for those who had been mentioned at the division level.
- Silver-gilt star (étoile en vermeil), for those who had been mentioned at the corps level.
- Bronze palm (palme en bronze), for those who had been mentioned at the army level.
- Silver palm (palme en argent), represents five bronze ones.
- Silver-gilt palm (palme en vermeil), for those who had been mentioned at the Free French Forces level (World War II only).

The clasps are awarded for gallantry to any member of the French military or its allies and are, depending on the degree, roughly the equivalent to the U.S. Bronze Star and Silver Star or UK Military Cross and Military Medal.

The awarding of the Military Cross is carried out in a solemn ceremony with the presentation of the award. For example, the Soviet personnel of the Normandie-Niemen air regiment received their second Military Crosses 1939 (and Major S.D. Agavelyan received his third Military Cross 1939) in addition to the ones they had previously received in the USSR, personally from Charles de Gaulle.

== Vichy France version ==
Following the German invasion and occupation of France in May 1940, the French collaborationist government (Vichy France; officially called État français, the "French State") created two croix during World War II, both utilizing a black-and-green ribbon pattern instead of the original red-and-green. These croix were both disavowed by the Free French government and the postwar French government, and wearing them is illegal in France. The Vichy Croix de Guerre employed the same tiered citations for the award as the officially-recognised version, excluding the added gilt palm.

The Vichy War Cross 1939-1940 (Croix de guerre 1939–1940) was not prohibited as such, but it was suspended, and awards that did not fall under the provisions of Article 3 of the Decree of January 7, 1944, had to be reviewed separately. Those who received the "Vichy" Croix de guerre 1939-1940 for the campaigns in France and Norway in 1939-1940 (i.e., the first review of awards in 1940) automatically received the right to wear the Croix de guerre 1939 on a red-and-green ribbon.

However, according to specialized foreign phaleristics sources, no review of the awards has been carried out, and there is currently no information about such a review or its results, as well as no regulations on the procedure for replacing the ribbon or the cross itself.

Ribbon	Awards
	Croix de guerre (Vichy France; for World War II service)
	Croix de guerre de la Légion des Volontaires Français (for Eastern Front World War II service)

== Notable non-French recipients ==
- William George Barker
- Omar Bradley
- Joseph Collins
- Douglas Fairbanks, Jr.
- Haile Selassie
- Virginia Hall
- Courtney Hodges
- Samuel M. Hogan
- Lyman Lemnitzer
- Douglas MacArthur
- Robert Mellard
- Draža Mihajlović
- Malcolm Muggeridge
- Audie Murphy
- George S. Patton, Jr.
- Prince Philip, Duke of Edinburgh
- Denis Rake
- Rainier III, Prince of Monaco
- Matthew Ridgway
- Robert Rosenthal (USAAF officer)
- James Stewart
- Maxwell Taylor
- Strom Thurmond
- John William Vessey, Jr.
- Paul F. Warburg
- William A. Wellman
- William Westmoreland
- Earle Wheeler
- Richard Winters
- Joseph Wolhandler
- Tommy Yeo-Thomas
- Mohammad Reza Pahlavi

== See also ==
- Ribbons of the French military and civil awards
- Croix de guerre 1914–1918
- Croix de Guerre (Belgium)
