= Armor (magazine) =

Professional journal of the U.S. Army Armor Branch

ARMOR
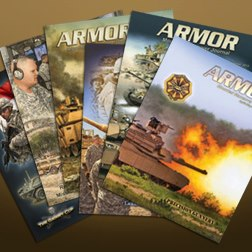
- Categories: Armored warfare
- Frequency: Quarterly
- Publisher: U.S. Army Armor Center
- Founded: 1888
- Country: USA
- Based in: Fort Benning, Georgia
- Language: English
- Website: https://www.benning.army.mil/armor/eArmor/
- OCLC: 44288631

ARMOR is the professional journal of the U.S. Army’s Armor Branch, published by the Chief of Armor at Fort Benning, Georgia, training center for the Army's tank and cavalry forces (United States Army Armor School). ARMOR magazine is the U.S. Army's oldest professional journal, founded by U.S. Cavalry officers in 1888, and originally titled as Journal of the United States Cavalry Association.

== History ==
The Journal of the United States Cavalry Association became The Cavalry Journal in 1920. The Cavalry Journal was originally created by Cavalry officers on the American frontier as a forum for discussing doctrine, tactics and equipment among soldiers geographically separated by the great distances of the American West. With the creation of the U.S. armored forces in 1940, The Cavalry Journal was renamed in 1946 to Armored Cavalry Journal and then to Armor, the Magazine of Mobile Warfare in 1950. Prior to 1974, the Armor Association, a private organization, published the magazine, but the U.S. Army Armor School began publishing ARMOR as of the March–April 1974 edition. The publication is now a professional bulletin published under the authority of Army Regulation 25–30. Its current name is ARMOR, subtitled Mounted Maneuver Journal. Since 1983, the eArmor site is the official publisher of the journal.

== Literature ==
- Zaloga, Steven J. Armored Thunderbolt; The US Army Sherman in World War II. Mechanicsville, PA (USA): Stackpole Books. ISBN 978-0-8117-0424-3.

== See also ==
- Field Artillery (magazine)
- Infantry (magazine)
