= Eddie Panagabko =

Canadian ice hockey player

- Born: May 17, 1934; Norquay, Saskatchewan, Canada
- Died: January 18, 1979 (aged 44)
- Height: 5 ft 9 in (175 cm)
- Weight: 170 lb (77 kg; 12 st 2 lb)
- Position: Centre
- Shot: Left
- Played for: Boston Bruins
- Playing career: 1954–1968

Edwin Arnold "Ed" Panagabko (May 17, 1934 in Norquay, Saskatchewan — January 18, 1979) was a Canadian ice hockey player who played 29 games in the National Hockey League with the Boston Bruins between 1955 and 1957. The rest of his career, which lasted from 1954 to 1968, was spent in the American Hockey League (AHL) and Western Hockey League (WHL). As captain of the San Francisco Seals he won the Lester Patrick Cup as WHL champion twice (1962–1963 and 1963–1964). He is interred at Skylawn Memorial Park in San Mateo, California.

== Career statistics ==
=== Regular season and playoffs ===
			Regular season					Playoffs
Season	Team	League	GP	G	A	Pts	PIM	GP	G	A	Pts	PIM
1951–52	Humboldt Indians	SJHL	43	31	19	50	20	9	11	3	14	6
1952–53	Humboldt Indians	SJHL	33	24	27	51	2	12	5	7	12	4
1953–54	Humboldt Indians	SJHL	32	10	20	30	27	5	2	2	4	10
1953–54	Seattle Bombers	WHL	1	0	0	0	0	—	—	—	—	—
1953–54	Melville Millionaires	SSHL	—	—	—	—	—	4	1	1	2	2
1954–55	Grand Rapids Rockets	IHL	60	25	35	60	53	4	2	2	4	2
1955–56	Boston Bruins	NHL	28	0	3	3	38	—	—	—	—	—
1955–56	Hershey Bears	AHL	41	16	25	41	52	—	—	—	—	—
1956–57	Boston Bruins	NHL	1	0	0	0	0	—	—	—	—	—
1956–57	Hershey Bears	AHL	58	13	19	32	44	7	0	2	2	8
1957–58	Hershey Bears	AHL	61	12	14	26	24	10	0	0	0	6
1958–59	Providence Reds	AHL	69	13	36	49	50	—	—	—	—	—
1959–60	Providence Reds	AHL	49	7	21	28	25	5	5	2	7	2
1960–61	Providence Reds	AHL	68	20	32	52	45	—	—	—	—	—
1961–62	Portland Buckaroos	WHL	17	2	6	8	9	—	—	—	—	—
1961–62	Los Angeles Blades	WHL	52	22	46	68	28	—	—	—	—	—
1962–63	San Francisco Seals	WHL	70	31	47	78	42	17	3	11	14	2
1963–64	San Francisco Seals	WHL	67	15	29	44	35	11	8	9	17	6
1964–65	San Francisco Seals	WHL	70	21	43	64	59	—	—	—	—	—
1966–67	San Diego Gulls	WHL	57	9	22	31	14	—	—	—	—	—
1967–68	San Diego Gulls	WHL	44	2	2	4	29	7	0	1	1	0
AHL totals			346	81	147	228	240	22	5	4	9	16
WHL totals			378	102	195	297	216	35	11	21	32	8
NHL totals			29	0	3	3	38	—	—	—	—	—
