= Field Artillery (magazine) =

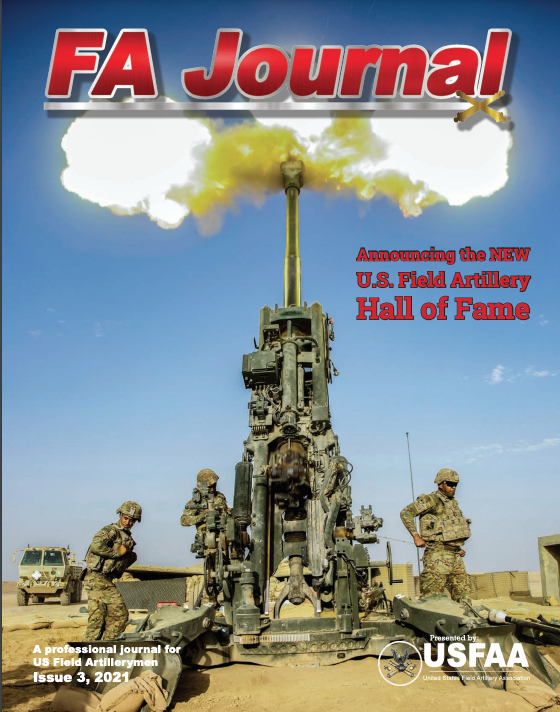
- FA Journal Cover, Issue 3 - 2021
- Editor: Rachal Smith
- Categories: United States Army Field Artillery
- Frequency: Quarterly
- Publisher: US Field Artillery Association
- Founded: 1911
- First issue: 1911
- Company: US Field Artillery Association
- Country: USA
- Based in: Fort Sill, Oklahoma
- Language: English
- Website: www.Fieldartillery.org
- ISSN: 0899-2525

Field Artillery (or FA) is a professionally published magazine on the subject of field artillery, published from 1911 to 2007, and after a brief hiatus now published quarterly. It is published by the US Field Artillery Association, headquartered at Fort Sill, Oklahoma. It was an official publication of the United States Army Field Artillery Corps. Its intended readership included active and reserve U.S. Army and Marine field artillerymen stationed around the world. FA Magazine/Journal included much discussion of the military operations in both Afghanistan and Iraq and currently discusses relevant topics and articles from Active duty, National Guard, and Marines about the Modernization and Future of the Field Artillery.

Articles are accepted and published based on validity of information and are references and accurate according to official DOD Doctrine unless specified as an opinion piece.

== History ==
The magazine was first published as the Field Artillery Journal in 1911. It has gone through several name changes. Due to low subscriptions, it merged with the Infantry Journal in 1950, and was published as Combat Forces Journal; CFJ became Army in 1954.

The US Army Artillery and Missile School began the in-house publication of Tactical and Technical Trends in Artillery for Instruction in 1957 that was renamed to Artillery Trends in 1958. After the Artillery branch split into the Field Artillery and Air Defense Artillery branches in 1969, the name changed to The Field Artilleryman. Field Artillery Journal restarted in 1973 as an official Field Artillery branch publication. Due to budget cuts, the magazine dropped a number of sections and was renamed Field Artillery in 1987.As part of the cost-saving measures of Base Realignment and Closure, several branch professional magazines were directed to merge. Field Artillery ceased publication with its final edition of March–April 2007. The FA Journal took a brief hiatus with publication and supported its successor as the FIRES Journal. In 2019, under new leadership from MG(R) Mark McDonald and LTG(R) David Halverson and editor, Ms. Rachal Smith, the FA Journal began printing once again quarterly. The Magazine is currently mailed to all members of the U.S. Field Artillery Association which consist of Active Duty Army, National Guard, Marine Corps and Marine Corps Reserve, FA Re-enactors and Civilians world wide.

== See also ==
- Armor
- Infantry
