= Robert Mellard =

U.S. Army sergeant (1919–1976)

- Mellard in 1946
- Born: Robert Burnett Mellard; May 13, 1919; Hope, New Mexico, U.S.
- Died: September 19, 1976 (aged 57); San Francisco, California, U.S.
- Burial place: Skylawn Memorial Park, San Mateo County, California, U.S.
- Spouses: Helen Kanski (m. 1941; div. 1948) Ida Louise Krast (m. 1949, divorced) Aileen Cameron (m. 1961)
- Relatives: Frank Courtney Mellard (uncle)
- Military career
- Allegiance: United States
- Branch: United States Army
- Service years: 1938–1946 (World War II); 1951–1954 (Korean War); 1959– (Vietnam War)
- Rank: Technical sergeant; World War II; Chief warrant officer; Vietnam War
- Service number: 06573444; W–2144704 (as officer)
- Units: Company D; 32nd Infantry Division; 1st Battalion, 30th Infantry Regiment; 3rd Infantry Division
- Conflicts: World War II; Africa; Battle of Monte Cassino; France; Germany; Italy; Sicily; Korean War; Vietnam War
- Awards: Presidential Unit Citation; Combat Infantryman Badge; European–African–Middle Eastern Campaign Medal (7); Silver Star Medal (4); Bronze Star Medal (4); Purple Heart (2); Croix de Guerre with palm (Unit award)
- Other work: Electrical engineer; Real estate

Robert Burnett Mellard (May 13, 1919 – September 19, 1976) was an American soldier who fought in World War II, the Korean War and Vietnam War, serving in the United States Army from 1938 to 1959.

He fought at the Battle of Monte Cassino and was part of the earliest strike landings at Saint-Tropez, France, Fedala, Licata, Sicily and the Battle of Anzio.

For his service, Mellard was awarded the Presidential Unit Citation, Combat Infantryman Badge, Silver Star, Bronze Star, Purple Heart and his unit received the French Croix de Guerre.

== Personal life ==
Mellard was born on May 13, 1919, in Hope, New Mexico to Robert Burnett Mellard and Clyde Carrie Upchurch. Before joining the United States Army at Camp Roberts, California, he completed three years of high school, was an electrical engineer, and lived in Billings County, North Dakota and San Diego, California. Mellard is the nephew of Frank Courtney Mellard and married Helen Kanski on May 5, 1941, in Olympia, Washington.

Mellard left for Europe on October 22, 1942, and did not see his wife again until their fourth anniversary in 1945 after traveling from Camp Patrick Henry to Minneapolis, Minnesota. On September 26, 1948, the couple filed for divorce. Mellard married Ida Louise Krast in Thurston County, Washington, on April 22, 1949 and Aileen Cameron on November 1, 1961. He later became a member of the San Francisco Real Estate Board.

== US Army service ==
Mellard joined the United States Army in 1938 and his unit was Company D, 32nd Infantry Division at Fort Ord. During World War II, he was a platoon sergeant for the Third Infantry Division. Mellard was stationed in Africa but spent much of his time in battle throughout Europe in Sicily, Italy, France and Germany.

Mellard was part of the first assaults at Saint-Tropez, France, Fedala, North Africa, Licata, Sicily, and in the 3rd Marine Division at Fifth Army's beachhead during the Battle of Anzio. During combat at the Battle of Monte Cassino in Alsace–Lorraine and France, he was wounded on his back, hands and legs from heavy artillery and recovered from his injuries at Letterman General Hospital. Mellard enlisted in the Korean War from April 1, 1951 – May 1, 1954. On October 31, 1959, he enlisted in the Vietnam War as a chief warrant officer.

While stationed in Long Beach, California, Mellard was awarded the Silver Star for his service on January 25, 1944, in Italy. He and a corporal ignored heavy fire in the line of duty, inching their way 100 yards outside of his infantry battalion, setting up a M252 mortar observation from a farmhouse. From his post, he directed mortar fire that destroyed an anti-tank gun, a machine gun, several enemy personnel and took out three motorcyclists. At one point, Mellard killed a German who attempted to flank him. A liaison officer and battalion commander were able to make their way to them, but the four of them took fire. Mellard and the corporal managed to retreat, but the commander was wounded and the officer was killed.

== Auto accidents ==
=== Moss Landing ===
On July 29, 1940, Mellard and three members of his unit were in an automobile that overturned near Moss Landing, California. He was a passenger and was treated for serious injuries at a hospital in Presidio of Monterey, California.

=== Hit and run ===
On November 8, 1946, Mellard was driving an Army recruiting truck in Oakland, California, when he hit Johnnie Calvin James. James died at the scene and Mellard fled. He reported the accident to his superior officers at Camp Knight and was charged on felony hit and run and manslaughter. He was booked at Oakland City Jail and held on $4,000 bail. He pleaded guilty and a second account of manslaughter was dismissed. He went before a judge for sentencing on December 30.

== Death ==
Mellard died on September 19, 1976, in San Francisco, California. He was buried at Skylawn Memorial Park in San Mateo County, California.

== Commendations ==
Awards
Image	Decoration	Notes	Ref.
	Presidential Unit Citation	Distinguished Unit Badge	
	Combat Infantryman Badge		
	Silver Star with three bronze oak leaf clusters (four awards)	First and second award for action in Italy in 1943 and 1944, Headquarters, 3d Infantry Division, General Orders No. 64 (1944). Third and fourth award for action in Germany, on 26 March 1945, Headquarters, 3d Infantry Division, General Orders No. 79 (1945).	
	Bronze Star with three bronze oak leaf clusters (four awards)		
	Purple Heart with two oak leaf clusters	For wounds at the Battle of Monte Cassino in Alsace–Lorraine and France.	
	Croix de Guerre 1939–1945 with Palm	Unit award	
	Good Conduct Medal		
	European–African–Middle Eastern Campaign Medal with seven battle stars		
	American Defense Service Medal		
