= Frank Courtney Mellard =

American pioneer and cattleman

- Born: Francis Courtney Mellard; February 27, 1878; Wrightsboro, Texas, U.S.
- Died: February 17, 1970 (aged 91); Alpine, Texas, U.S.
- Other names: F. C. Mellard; Courtney Mellard
- Occupations: Cattle rancher; author
- Spouses: Helen Buchanon (m. 1900; died 1949) Lillian Amelia Bilbo (m. 1950)
- Children: 3
- Parents: Robert Thomas Mellard; Sallie Lytle Wilson
- Relatives: Robert Mellard (nephew)

Francis Courtney Mellard (27 February 1878 – 17 February 1970) was an American cattle rancher and author.

== Career ==
In 1908, Mellard took ownership of property for a cattle ranch south of Marfa, Texas. He helped build the first school in Marfa, and by the late 1950s, he estimated to have sent around 250,000 calves and yearlings to the Corn Belt region.

== Personal life ==
Mellard was born on February 27, 1878, to Robert Thomas Mellard and Sallie Lytle Wilson. His father's family moved near Snyder, Texas in 1897 and he married Helen Buchanon on August 1, 1900. They had three sons before her death on November 9, 1949. On December 23, 1950, Mellard married Lillian Turney in El Paso, Texas. He is the uncle to United States Army veteran Robert Mellard.

Mellard was an active Methodist Church member and had the oldest degree master in the El Paso Consistory of the Masonic Lodge, serving as Master of the Seventh Degree for over 30 years.

== Published works ==
- Mellard, F. C. (1957). The Dream of a Youthful Cowboy. United States: (n.p.). ASIN B00CDZV9K0
