= Sergeant Major of the Marine Corps =

Senior enlisted member of the U.S. Marine Corps

- Dress uniform insignia of the SMMC

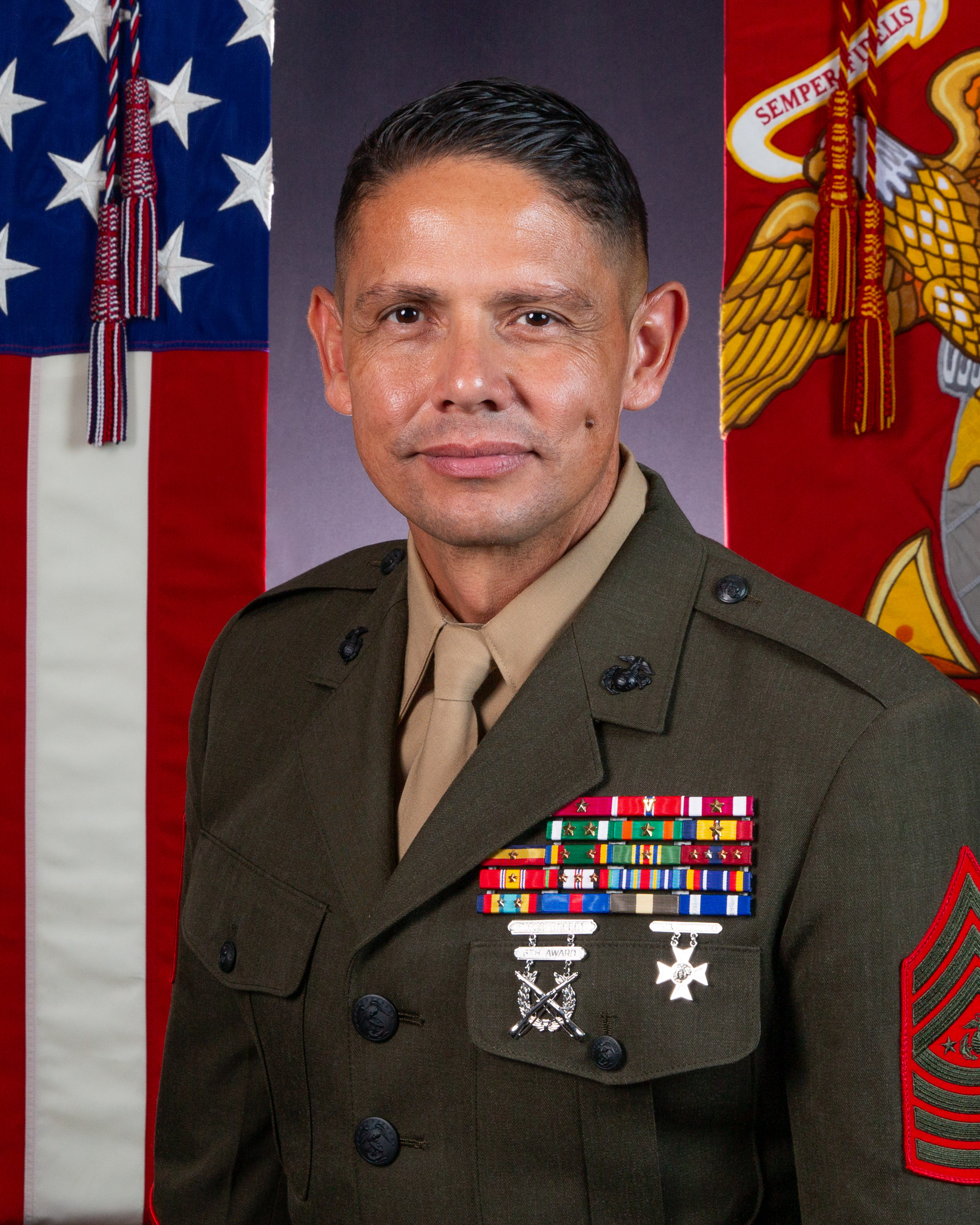
- Incumbent; SMMC Carlos A. Ruiz since August 10, 2023
- United States Marine Corps
- Abbreviation: SMMC
- Reports to: Commandant of the Marine Corps
- Seat: Headquarters Marine Corps
- Appointer: Commandant of the Marine Corps
- Term length: 4 years
- Formation: May 23, 1957
- First holder: Wilbur Bestwick
- Unofficial names: Sergeant major
- Salary: $10,758.00 per month, regardless of the incumbent's service longevity
- Website: www.hqmc.marines.mil/smmc

The sergeant major of the Marine Corps (officially abbreviated to SMMC) is a billet that is distinguished by a unique rank insignia and receives a special pay above the E-9 basic pay. The holder of this rank and position is the most senior enlisted marine in the Marine Corps, unless an enlisted marine is serving as the senior enlisted advisor to the chairman (SEAC) of the Joint Chiefs of Staff. (Note: Troy E. Black, the 19th SMMC, was the most recent marine to serve as SEAC, serving in the role from 3 November 2023 to 20 June 2025.)

Current service uniform rank insignia of the SMMC.

Rank insignia of the SMMC from 1957 to 1970; became the rank insignia for a sergeant major afterwards.

In the U.S. Marine Corps, sergeant major is the ninth and one of two ranks that are the highest enlisted ranks, just above first sergeant and master sergeant (both E-8 pay grade), and equal in grade to master gunnery sergeant, although the two have different responsibilities. A sergeant major typically serves as the unit commander's senior enlisted adviser and handles matters of discipline and morale among the enlisted Marines. The sergeant major of the Marine Corps is chosen by the commandant of the Marine Corps to serve as his adviser and is the preeminent and highest-ranking enlisted Marine unless an enlisted marine is serving as the senior enlisted advisor to the Chairman. The SMMC holds an order of precedence equivalent to a lieutenant general.

Although not officially considered a sergeant major of the Marine Corps, when Archibald Sommers was appointed to sergeant major on January 1, 1801, it was a solitary post, similar to the modern billet of sergeant major of the Marine Corps. In 1833, an act of legislation made the rank of sergeant major permanent for the Marine Corps, and by 1899 five Marines held the rank of sergeant major. This continued until 1946, when the rank was abolished, only to be re-introduced in 1954 as part of the Marine Corps rank structure.

The post of sergeant major of the Marine Corps was established in 1957 from the order of assistant chief of staff for personnel at Headquarters Marine Corps, Brigadier General James P. Berkeley, as the senior enlisted advisor to the commandant of the Marine Corps, the first such post in any of the five branches of the United States Armed Forces. In 1970, the rank insignia of the sergeant major of the Marine Corps was authorized (which features three stripes, the Eagle, Globe, and Anchor flanked by two five-point stars in the center, and four rockers) as opposed to the standard Sergeant Major rank insignia (which features three stripes, one five-point star in the center, and four rockers), which was used for the rank from the post's creation in 1957 to 1970. The verbal address for the rank is generally "sergeant major", though "sergeant major of the Marine Corps" is utilized in formal situations.

The commandant of the Marine Corps selects the sergeant major of the Marine Corps and typically serves a four-year term, though his service is at the discretion of the Commandant. Since Sergeant Major Wilbur Bestwick was appointed the first Sergeant Major of the Marine Corps in 1957, 20 different Marines have filled this post.

== List of sergeants major of the Marine Corps ==
| No. | Portrait | Name | Term of office | | | Ref. |
| No. | Portrait | Name | Took office | Left office | Duration | Ref. |
|---|---|---|---|---|---|---|
| 1 | black & white photograph of Wilbur Bestwick | Wilbur Bestwick (1911–1972) | May 23, 1957 | September 1, 1959 | 2 years, 101 days | |
| 2 | black & white photograph of Francis D. Rauber | Francis D. Rauber (1901–1991) | September 1, 1959 | June 29, 1962 | 2 years, 301 days | |
| 3 | black & white photograph of Thomas J. McHugh | Thomas J. McHugh (1919–2000) | June 29, 1962 | July 17, 1965 | 3 years, 18 days | |
| 4 | black & white photograph of Herbert J. Sweet | Herbert J. Sweet (1919–1998) | July 17, 1965 | August 1, 1969 | 4 years, 15 days | |
| 5 | black & white photograph of Joseph W. Dailey | Joseph W. Dailey (1917–2007) | August 1, 1969 | February 1, 1973 | 3 years, 184 days | |
| 6 | black & white photograph of Clinton A. Puckett | Clinton A. Puckett (1926–2002) | February 1, 1973 | June 1, 1975 | 2 years, 120 days | |
| 7 | black & white photograph of Henry H. Black | Henry H. Black (1929–2012) | June 1, 1975 | April 1, 1977 | 1 year, 304 days | |
| 8 | black & white photograph of John R. Massaro | John R. Massaro (1930–) | April 1, 1977 | August 16, 1979 | 2 years, 137 days | |
| 9 | black & white photograph of Leland D. Crawford | Leland D. Crawford (1930–1993) | August 16, 1979 | June 28, 1983 | 3 years, 316 days | |
| 10 | | Robert E. Cleary (1931–2018) | June 28, 1983 | June 27, 1987 | 3 years, 364 days | |
| 11 | black & white photograph of David W. Sommers | David W. Sommers (1943–) | June 27, 1987 | June 28, 1991 | 4 years, 1 day | |
| 12 | black & white photograph of Harold G. Overstreet | Harold G. Overstreet (1944–) | June 28, 1991 | June 30, 1995 | 4 years, 2 days | |
| 13 | black & white photograph of Lewis G. Lee | Lewis G. Lee (1950–) | June 30, 1995 | June 29, 1999 | 3 years, 364 days | |
| 14 | color photograph of Alford L. McMichael | Alford L. McMichael (1952–) | June 29, 1999 | June 26, 2003 | 3 years, 362 days | |
| 15 | color photograph of John L. Estrada | John L. Estrada (1955–) | June 26, 2003 | April 25, 2007 | 3 years, 303 days | |
| 16 | color photograph of Carlton W. Kent | Carlton W. Kent (1957–) | April 25, 2007 | June 9, 2011 | 4 years, 45 days | |
| 17 | color photograph of Micheal P. Barrett | Micheal P. Barrett (1963–) | June 9, 2011 | February 20, 2015 | 3 years, 256 days | |
| 18 | color photograph of Ronald L. Green | Ronald L. Green (1964–) | February 20, 2015 | July 26, 2019 | 4 years, 156 days | |
| 19 | color photograph of Troy E. Black | Troy E. Black (1969-) | July 26, 2019 | August 10, 2023 | 4 years, 15 days | |
| 20 | color photograph of Carlos A. Ruiz | Carlos A. Ruiz (1975–) | August 10, 2023 | Incumbent | 3 years, 28 days | |

== See also ==
- Sergeant Major of the Army
- Command Sergeant Major of the US Army Reserve
- Master Chief Petty Officer of the Navy
- Chief Master Sergeant of the Air Force
- Chief Master Sergeant of the Space Force
- Master Chief Petty Officer of the Coast Guard
- Master Chief Petty Officer of the Coast Guard Reserve Force
- Senior Enlisted Advisor for the National Guard Bureau
- Senior Enlisted Advisor to the Chairman of the Joint Chiefs of Staff
