= Infantry (magazine) =

US army magazine

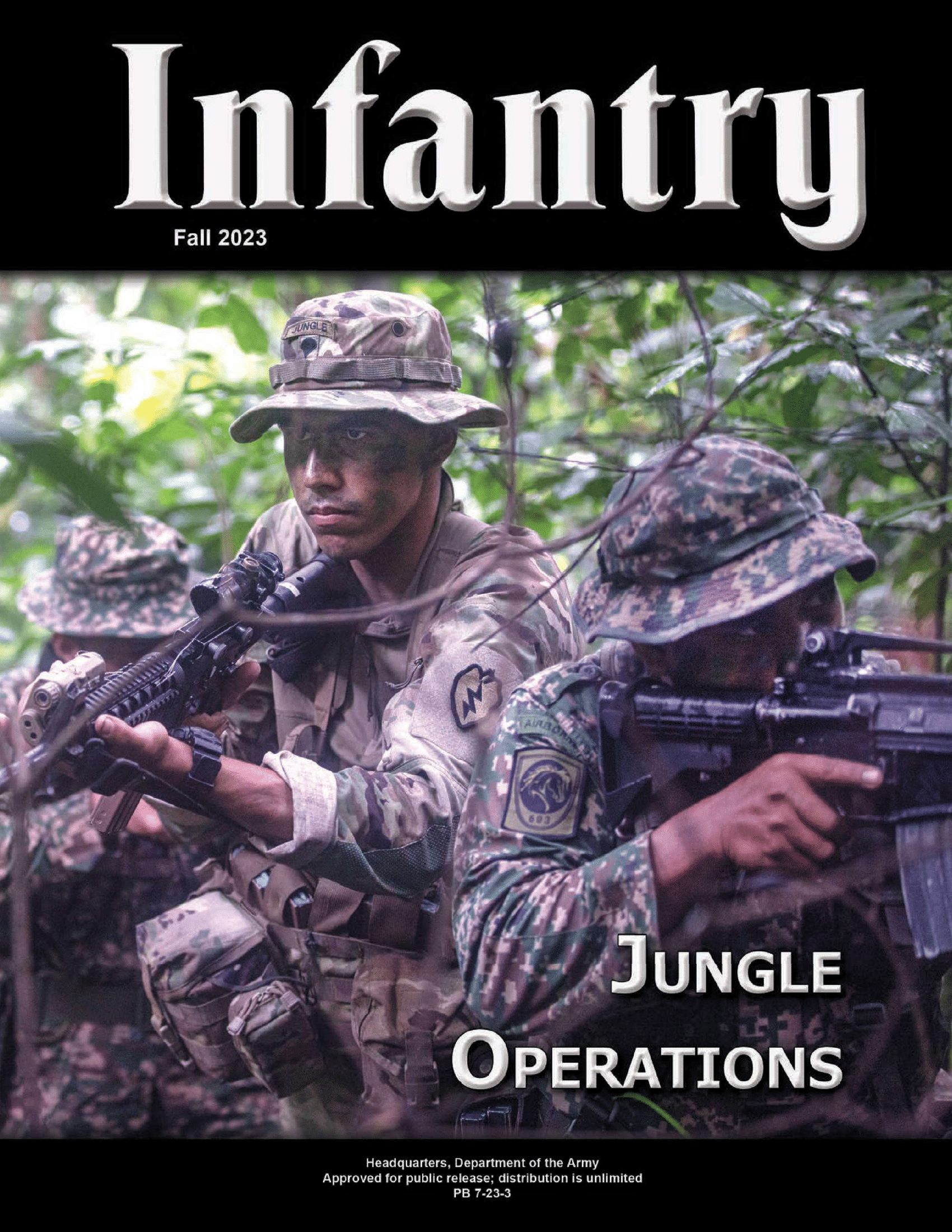
- Categories: Infantry warfare
- Frequency: Quarterly
- Publisher: U.S. Army Infantry School
- Founded: 1904
- Country: USA
- Based in: Fort Benning, Georgia
- Language: English
- Website: Infantry
- ISSN: 0019-9532
- OCLC: 4741952

Infantry is the professional journal of the U.S. Army soldier, published by the United States Army Infantry School at Fort Benning, Georgia. Following the success of ARMOR magazine (first published 1888), Infantry was launched in 1904 as the Journal of the U.S. Infantry Association, and has variously held the names Infantry Journal, Mailing List (Infantry School), and Infantry School Quarterly, before settling on the current name and format in 1959.

== See also ==
- Field Artillery
- Armor
