= Archibald Sommers =

- Military career
- Allegiance: United States of America
- Branch: United States Marine Corps
- Service years: 1799 - 1802
- Rank: Sergeant Major

Archibald Sommers (or Summers) was the first member of the United States Marine Corps to be promoted to the rank of sergeant major. He joined the Marine Corps in June 1799, was promoted to Sergeant Major on January 1, 1801, and was discharged in June 1802.
