= Sergeant major =

Military rank and appointment

Sergeant major is a senior non-commissioned rank or appointment in many militaries around the world.

== History ==
In 16th century Spain, the sargento mayor ("sergeant major") was a general officer. He commanded an army's infantry, and ranked about third in the army's command structure; he also acted as a sort of chief of staff to the army's commander.

In the 17th century, sergeants major appeared in individual regiments. These were field officers, third in command of their regiments (after their colonels and lieutenant colonels), with a role similar to the older, army-level sergeant major (although obviously on a smaller scale). The older position became known as "sergeant major general" to distinguish it. Over time, the term "sergeant" was dropped from both titles, giving rise to the modern ranks of major and major general.

The full title of sergeant major fell out of use until the latter part of the 18th century, when it began to be applied to the senior non-commissioned officer of an infantry battalion or cavalry regiment. At about this time, the U.S. and British histories of the title diverge, with the American Revolutionary War.

== Commonwealth of Nations forces ==
Sergeant major is now generally an appointment rather than a rank. The appointment is normally held by the senior warrant officer of an army or marine unit. These appointments are made at several levels: for example, the senior warrant officer of a company, battery or squadron, or the senior warrant officer of a battalion or regiment. A sergeant major of a regiment or battalion is known as a regimental sergeant major, rather than a "regiment sergeant major" or "battalion sergeant major".

The sergeant major of a unit is responsible to the commanding officer for advising them on matters relating to non-commissioned members of that unit. Sergeant majors are normally addressed as "sir" or "ma'am" by subordinates, and as "sergeant major", by their full title (or its abbreviation), or as "Mr" or "Ms" [surname], by superiors.

=== Australia ===
The most senior warrant officer in the Australian Army holds the unique rank of warrant officer (introduced in 1991 and senior to WO1) and the appointment of Regimental Sergeant Major of the Army (RSM-A). The RSM-A is responsible to the chief of Army, but responsive to all ranks across the Army. The RSM-A is a member of the personal staff of the chief of Army. The post of RSM-A has existed since January 1983 and was held by a WO1 until 1991. The RSM-A is the equivalent of the Royal Australian Navy's Warrant Officer of the Navy (WO-N) and the Royal Australian Air Force's Warrant Officer of the Air Force (WOFF-AF).

The RSM-A's primary role is to represent to the chief of Army and others, the solicited and unsolicited views, concerns and opinions of soldiers in the army, but also carry the chief of Army's message down and across the ranks.

=== Canada ===
==== Canadian Armed Forces ====
The appointment of sergeant major is given to the senior non-commissioned member within sub-units, units and some formations of the Canadian Army. The regimental sergeant-major is the senior sergeant major in a unit, such as armoured, artillery, engineer, and signal regiments, and infantry and service battalions. This appointment is normally held by a chief warrant officer.

Within sub-units (such as squadrons, companies and artillery batteries) the sub-unit sergeant-major generally holds the rank of master warrant officer and is known as a squadron, company or, battery sergeant major. They are addressed as "Sergeant-Major" (i.e. "SSM", "CSM", "BSM", etc.), "Mr", or "Ms" by officers and "Sir" or "Ma'am" by subordinates with the same conventions used for regimental sergeant majors.

In some unusual cases, a chief petty officer 1st class or chief petty officer 2nd class in the Royal Canadian Navy may succeed to a sergeant major's position, especially in units with a large number of "purple trades", such as service battalions. The forms of address generally remain the same, except that chief petty officers 1st and 2nd class are never addressed as "Sir" or "Ma'am", but as "Chief". Sergeant majors do not form part of the formation, unit, or sub-unit chain of command, as their role is to advise their commander on matters pertaining to the organization's non-commissioned members.

==== Royal Canadian Mounted Police ====
Sergeant major is a rank in the Royal Canadian Mounted Police. While technically it is the sixth level of rank, below corps sergeant major and above staff sergeant major, it, along with the other two, is a specialized rank and not part of the normal progression, which proceeds from staff sergeant to inspector.

=== Singapore ===
A sergeant major appointment exists in each military unit from company to division/formation. Their main job is to assist the commander in the discipline and welfare of the enlisted men. Their authority and responsibility at parades and ceremonies extends over even commissioned officers while on the parade square. In the Singapore Armed Forces, two kinds of sergeant major exist, a regimental sergeant major and a company sergeant major. A regimental sergeant major may be placed in charge of a battalion, brigade, division or service level. A regimental sergeant major could also be appointed as RSM for a vocation, i.e. infantry vocation/formation sergeant major. This appointment is usually held by a senior warrant officer or a master warrant officer, although at times a 1st warrant officer may be appointed. A company sergeant major may be a 1WO, 2WO and 3WO. Sometimes, a master sergeant or a staff sergeant may be appointed. Military Experts of rank ME 3 could also be sergeant majors, in-charge of logistical units or naval units. This practice is also mirrored in the National Cadet Corps with the master sergeant or staff sergeant being appointed as unit sergeant major. In schools with more than one NCC unit, i.e. having a land as well as a sea unit, an RSM might be appointed from either unit.

=== Sri Lanka ===
The rank or appointment of sergeant major exists in the Sri Lanka Army and Sri Lanka Police Service. In the army, a warrant officer 2nd class is known as a sergeant major; while a warrant officer 1st class is a regimental sergeant major. In the police, the most senior non-gazetted officer rank is police sergeant major.

=== South Africa ===
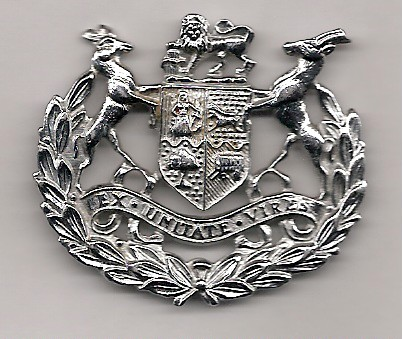
Warrant officer class 1 rank badge 1951–2002

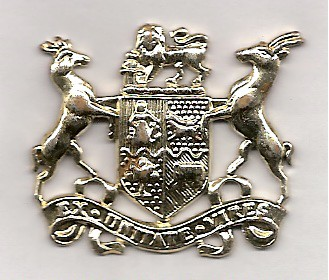
Warrant officer class 2 rank badge 1951–2002

As described above, sergeant-major is not a rank, but an appointment held by a warrant officer class 1 or warrant officer class 2. Regardless of the appointment, the warrant officer is addressed as "sergeant-major" (sersant-majoor in Afrikaans).

The rank was established in the Union Defence Forces in 1913, in a single class. The rank badge was a crown, senior appointments being indicated by a wreath around the badge.

The rank was divided into two classes in 1921. The national coat of arms was assigned as the badge of the 1st class, and the crown was assigned to the 2nd class. In both classes, senior appointments were indicated by a wreath around the badge.

From 1957 to 2002, all warrant officers 1st class wore the wreathed coat of arms, and the warrant officer 2nd class wore the plain coat of arms. Since 2002, all warrant officers have worn the new national coat of arms, the classes and appointments being indicated by the shape of the surrounding frame, and the addition of stars and crossed swords above the arms.

Up until 1 June 2008, the highest appointment (level 1), that was held by a warrant officer class 1 was the sergeant-major of the South African National Defence Force.

Other senior warrant officer appointments up until 1 June 2008 were:

- Level 2: Sergeant-Major of the Army
- Level 3: Formation sergeant-major
- Level 4: Group or base sergeant-major or regimental sergeant-major

The South African Air Force had a similar structure for its warrant officers who are also addressed as "sergeant-major".

Starting 1 June 2008, the warrant ranks (Army/ Navy/ Air Force) are:

- Master chief warrant officer (formerly level 1)—e.g. Master Chief Warrant Officer of the South African National Defence Force
- Senior chief warrant officer (formerly level 2)—e.g. Senior Chief Warrant Officer of the South African Army
- Chief warrant officer (formerly level 3)
- Master warrant officer (formerly level 4A)
- Senior warrant officer (formerly level 4)
- Warrant officer class one
- Warrant officer class two

A company/squadron/battery sergeant major should ordinarily be a WO2.

=== United Kingdom ===
In the British Army and Royal Marines, company/battery/squadron sergeant major is an appointment for a WO2 and regimental sergeant major is a WO1 appointment.

Due to differences in nomenclature between Regiments and Corps, sergeant majors' titles do vary; squadron sergeant major and battery sergeant major for instance would be found in the cavalry and Royal Artillery respectively, and in the Royal Electrical and Mechanical Engineers, there are the appointments of artificer sergeant major.

Sergeant major instructor is an appointment held by warrant officers class 1 in the Small Arms School Corps and the Army Physical Training Corps and by some WO1s in the Royal Engineers. It is also an appointment held by some of the civilian adult instructors in the Army Cadet Force.

A machinist sergeant-major (MSM) is a specialist most often found in the Corps of Royal Engineers or the Royal Army Service Corps, and was the title of one of the major characters in the book and the film based on it, Ice Cold in Alex.

For the use of "sergeant major" as a form of address, see the articles on regimental and company sergeant majors, and that on staff sergeants. In the plural, modern practice by the British Ministry of Defence uses the term 'sergeant majors' rather than 'sergeants major'.

The posts of regimental and squadron corporal major are the Household Cavalry's equivalent of sergeant majors, as the Household Cavalry traditionally does not have ranks named sergeant. The Rifles use the spelling serjeant major, in common with the spelling used for serjeant and colour serjeant.

A new post of Army Sergeant Major was created in 2015.

==== History ====
The first British use of the term was around 1680 and was applied to the senior sergeant in the colonel's company of an infantry regiment, but it was not formalised until 1797, when the sergeant major was added to the battalion or regimental staff. When chevrons were introduced as badges of rank, he wore four, later under a crown.

In 1813, cavalry regiments introduced the troop sergeant major to replace the quartermaster as the senior NCO of a troop; this required the existing position to be explicitly redesignated the regimental sergeant major. Later, the rise of the squadron as the principal sub-regimental unit saw the corresponding introduction of the squadron sergeant major. The infantry, however, hung on to the undifferentiated, one-per-battalion sergeant major until the eve of the First World War, when the introduction of the company sergeant major forced them to adopt the RSM title as well. (As an infantry regiment could be, and usually was, made up of a number of battalions, one would logically expect the new title to be battalion sergeant major rather than regimental sergeant major. Perhaps the infantry felt this would imply a lower status than their cavalry equivalents.)

In 1881, the cavalry RSM and infantry sergeant major were among a number of senior non-commissioned positions that were confirmed with warrants, making them warrant officers. This was extended and rationalised in 1915, with the introduction of the new ranks of warrant officer class I (WOI) and warrant officer class II (WOII). RSM became an appointment of the former, CSM and SSM of the latter.

The Royal Marines continued to use a single rank of sergeant major, equating to warrant officer class I, until after the Second World War, when they adopted the Army system.

The Royal Flying Corps and its successor the Royal Air Force used the ranks of sergeant-major 1st and 2nd class instead of warrant officer class I and II until the 1930s, when the RAF adopted the Army-style ranks. The RAF has not used sergeant major as either a rank or an appointment since that time.

== France ==
In France, the rank of sergent-major (distinct from the rank of major) was created in 1776. He was the highest ranked non-commissioned officer (French: sous-officier) in the infantry company; the equivalent in the cavalry was the maréchal-des-logis-chef. The sergeant-major was charged with the administration of the company. Under the Ancien Regime, the equivalent at the general staff headquarters of the regiment was the adjudant sous-officiers, a rank which was also established in 1776, who was the senior NCO of the regiment.

Following the reforms of the Franco-Prussian War of 1870, it became harder to ascend to the officer corps, due to primarily age restrictions. With the addition of an adjudant (warrant officer) in each company, the sergeant-major became limited to purely administrative functions.

The rank was replaced with that of sergent-chef in 1928. The rank was re-established from 1942 until 1962 between sergent-chef and adjudant as the NCO in charge of the accounting responsibility of the company. There were no promotions to sergeant-major after 1964 and the rank was formally abolished in 1971. The last NCO to have held the rank retired in 1985.

Notable soldiers who held the rank of sergeant-major included Marshal of France François Achille Bazaine, Édouard Husband, and Henri Tonel.

== United States ==
Sergeant major
- Army and Marine Corps insignia
- Country: United States
- Service branch: United States Army; United States Marine Corps
- Abbreviation: SGM (USA); SgtMaj (USMC)
- Rank group: Non-commissioned officer
- NATO rank code: OR-9
- Pay grade: E-9
- Formation: 1776
- Next higher rank: Command sergeant major (USA); Sergeant Major of the Marine Corps (USMC)
- Next lower rank: First sergeant (USA and USMC)

=== United States Army ===
In the U.S. Army, sergeant major (SGM) refers to both a military rank and a personnel slot, or position title. It is the highest enlisted rank, just above first sergeant and master sergeant, with a pay grade of E–9, NATO rank OR–9.

The position of sergeant major goes back to General Friedrich Wilhelm von Steuben's Regulations for the Order and Discipline of the Troops of the United States (1779) also known as the Blue Book. This manual was created by the Prussian general for General George Washington to help make the Continental Army a true disciplined army able to meet the British Army in the field. Von Steuben laid out the duties of a sergeant major as an assistant to the regimental adjutant who keeps the roster, forms details, trains and disciplines the regiment.

By 1909, the Noncommissioned Officers’ Manual stated that the sergeant major should be an expert in Army Regulations, the Drill Regulations, the Manual of Guard Duty and so much of the Courts-Martial Manual and the other manuals that pertain to his duties.

The position disappeared from the Army in 1920 under General Order 36 to simplify the army's ranks until its return in 1959 under the recommendation of the Military Pay Bill of 1958. During this period, the most senior Master Sergeant would take on the roles of the sergeant major.

The leadership variation – command sergeant major (CSM), created in 1967 – is the senior enlisted advisor to the commanding officer. The leadership position carries with it certain ceremonial functions such as caring for the unit's colors (flag). Additionally, CSMs serve as monitors of, and advocates for, the enlisted soldiers in the command. This position mostly exists in units of battalion size and larger.

SGMs and CSMs serving in nominative positions (a position rated by a general officer or a civilian on the senior executive service pay scale) will wear the nominative senior enlisted leader insignia. All other sergeants major serving commanders at or below colonel wear their designated branch insignia.

Both the SGM and CSM are referred to, and addressed as, "Sergeant Major". The Sergeant Major of the Army is a separate and unique position, but is still addressed as "Sergeant Major".

=== United States Marine Corps ===
In the United States Marine Corps, sergeant major (E-9) is above first sergeant and master sergeant (both E-8 pay grade), and equal in pay grade to master gunnery sergeant, although the two have different responsibilities. While sergeant major is a rank, marines in this rank are almost exclusively in the command staff and are the senior enlisted leaders and advisors to their commanding officers. Marine sergeants major must have been a first sergeant to be promoted to this rank; master sergeants cannot be. Marine Corps sergeants major serve as the senior enlisted marine in the Corps' units of battalion, squadron or higher echelon, as the unit commander's senior enlisted advisor and to handle matters of discipline and morale among the enlisted marines. Sergeant Major of the Marine Corps is a separate and unique position/billet. The individual holding this billet is personally chosen by the Commandant of the Marine Corps and is the most senior enlisted marine in the Corps.

The U.S. Marine Corps' first sergeant major was Archibald Sommers, appointed on 1 January 1801. This was originally a solitary post, similar to the modern Sergeant Major of the Marine Corps, but by 1899 there were five sergeants major. The title was abolished in 1946, but re-introduced as a rank in 1954. The post of Sergeant Major of the Marine Corps was established in 1957, as the senior enlisted advisor to the Commandant of the United States Marine Corps.

=== Insignia ===
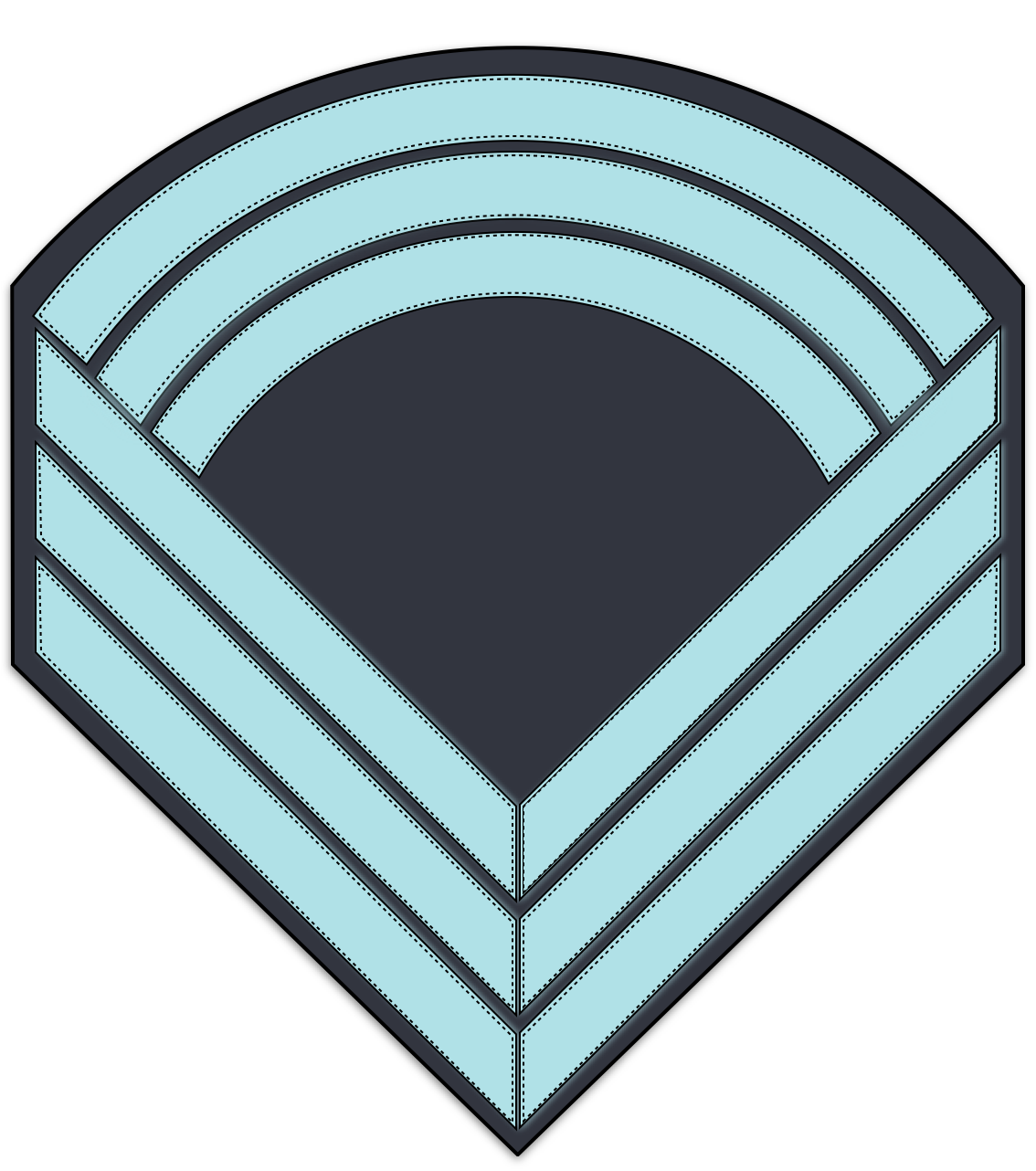
1851 pattern Sergeant Major insignia

The original insignia of rank was an epaulette, or strip, of red cloth sewn on each shoulder of the uniform coat. Between 1776 and 1851, the sergeant major rank insignia went through several changes until the "classic" pattern worn during the Civil War and throughout the Indian Wars was adopted. Generally, these styles included either staff non-commissioned officer (SNCO) epaulettes, chevrons, or a combination of both. (During this period, the rank insignia for the several SNCO ranks of sergeant major, quartermaster sergeant, drum major, and fife major were identical.) In 1821, SNCOs received a single yellow chevron, point up, above the elbow on each sleeve. (Company grade officers, including the new officer grade of "adjutant", ranking above captain and below major, and non-commissioned officers or NCOs, viz., sergeants and corporals, all received chevrons of various colors, materials, patterns, and placement as their insignia of rank.) In 1825, the sergeant major chevron insignia was changed to be identical to that of the adjutant, by adding an inverted arc below the chevron (very similar in design to the modern private first class insignia), although in a different color (yellow vice gold or silver) and material (worsted vice lace) than that of the officer rank. In 1832, SNCOs returned to a rank insignia denoted by elaborate epaulettes without the chevrons. All SNCOs and NCOs returned to having chevrons as their rank insignia in 1847, when a completely new system of insignia was introduced. This was the first implementation of the three chevrons over three arcs design (with the chevrons worn point-up) of the "traditional" sergeant major rank insignia. (The quartermaster finally received a distinctive rank insignia—three chevrons over three horizontal bars—and for the first time, the first sergeant, or orderly sergeant, received a distinctive rank insignia—three chevrons surmounting a lozenge.)

In 1851, the Army inverted the SNCO and NCO insignia again to be point-down. The rank was in use by both the Union Army and the Confederate Army during the American Civil War. At that time, it was the highest enlisted rank, being just above quartermaster sergeant. The same rank insignia, three point-down chevrons under three arcs, was used by both armies. Both armies varied the color of the stripes by assigning red for artillery, yellow for cavalry, and blue for infantry. Some Confederate militia units varied these colors even farther and had other colors, including black stripes, for various units.

1958 pattern Sergeant Major insignia

Command Sergeant Major insignia

In 1920, with the standardization of the army's enlisted pay grades, it ceased to be a title of rank or grade. However, it survived as the job title of the senior NCO of a battalion and was re-introduced as a rank in 1958 when Congress authorized the E–8 and E–9 pay grades (P.L. 85-422, 72 Stat. 122). This new iteration of sergeant major as a discrete grade of rank saw the new rank insignia of three chevrons above three arcs with a five pointed star between the chevrons and arcs. In that law (as amended), the authorized daily average number of enlisted members on active duty in an armed force in pay grade E–9 in a fiscal year may not be more than 1.25 percent, respectively, of the number of enlisted members of that armed force, subject to certain exceptions. A new insignia was authorized by DA Message 865848, 28 May 1968, for sergeants major assigned at the principal NCO of battalion and higher level command (viz., command sergeants major). This insignia was the same as the sergeant major insignia except the star was small and a wreath was placed around the star.

The appointment of Sergeant Major of the Army was created on 4 July 1966, and in 1979 received the unique grade of rank insignia of three chevrons above three arcs with two stars centered between the bottom chevron and the upper arc. In 1994, the insignia for Sergeant Major of the Army was changed to add the coat of arms of the United States between the two stars in the center of the insignia. The pin-on insignia is polished gold-plated with a black enamel background.

== Gallery ==
Sargento-maior
(Angolan Army)

Première sergent major
(Kirundi: Sereja majoro mu murwi wa mbere)
(Burundi Army)

Sargento-mor
(Cape Verdean National Guard)

Sergent-major
(Central African Ground Forces)

Sergent major
(Chadian Ground Forces)

Sargento mayor
(Colombian National Army)

Sergent major
(Land Forces of the DR Congo)

Sargento mayor
(Dominican Army)

Sargento mayor
(Salvadoran Army)

Sargento mayor
(Guatemalan Army)

Sargento mayor
(Honduran Army)

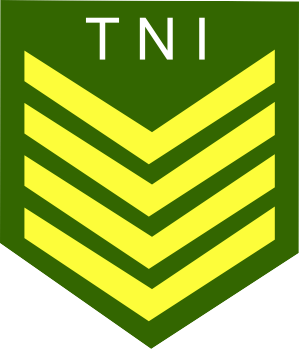
Sersan mayor
(Indonesian Army)

Sergente Maggiore
(Italian Army)

Seržantas majoras
(Lithuanian Land Force)

Sergent-major
(Madagascar Ground Forces)

ސާރޖަންޓް މޭޖަރ
Saarjant meyjar
(Maldives National Defence Force)

Sergent-major
(Moldovan Ground Forces)

Sergent-major
(Royal Moroccan Army)

Sergeant-majoor
(Royal Netherlands Army)

Sersjantmajor
(Norwegian Army)

Sargento-mor
(Portuguese Army)

Sergent-major
(Romanian Land Forces)

Sergeant major
(Rwandan Land Forces)

Sargento-mor
(Army of São Tomé and Príncipe)

Sergeant-majoor
(Suriname Army)

Sergeant major
(United States Army)

== See also ==
- Comparative military ranks
- United States Army enlisted rank insignia of World War I
- United States Army enlisted rank insignia of World War II
- Major (France)
