= Carlton W. Kent =

16th Sergeant Major of the Marine Corps

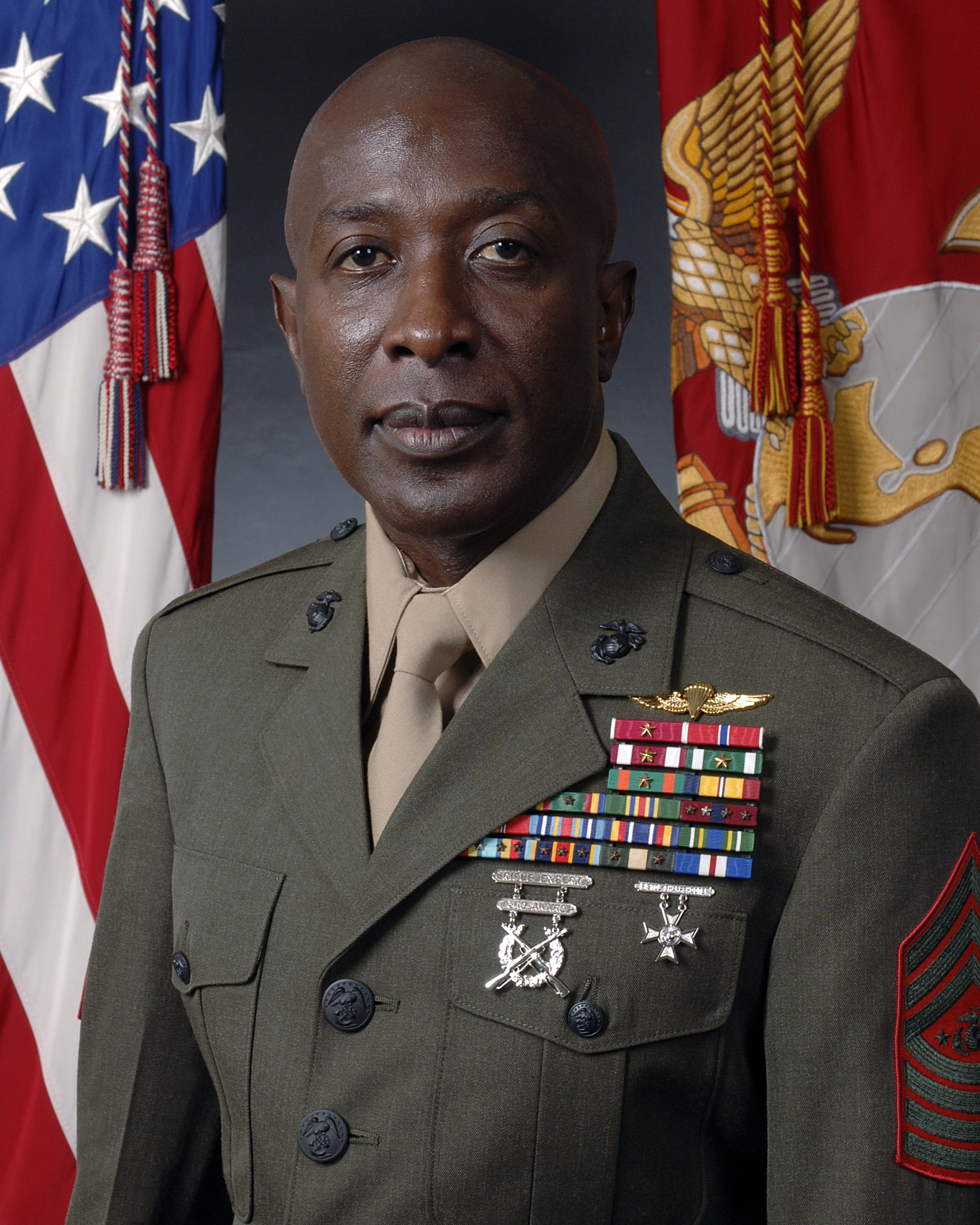
- Kent in January 2007
- Born: November 5, 1957 (age 68); Memphis, Tennessee, U.S.
- Military career
- Allegiance: United States
- Branch: United States Marine Corps
- Service years: 1976–2011
- Rank: Sergeant Major of the Marine Corps
- Awards: Navy Distinguished Service Medal; Legion of Merit (2); Bronze Star Medal; Meritorious Service Medal (2); Navy and Marine Corps Commendation Medal (2); Navy and Marine Corps Achievement Medal (2)

Carlton Wayne Kent (born November 5, 1957) is a retired United States Marine who served as the 16th Sergeant Major of the Marine Corps. He succeeded John L. Estrada on April 25, 2007, and was succeeded by Micheal Barrett on June 9, 2011.

== Early life and education ==
Carlton Wayne Kent was born in Memphis, Tennessee, on November 5, 1957. He graduated from the South Side High School in Memphis.

== Military career ==
Kent completed recruit training at Marine Corps Recruit Depot Parris Island, South Carolina, in March 1976 and was assigned to the 1st Marine Brigade. In May 1978, Kent was transferred to Marine Security Guard Battalion where he served as a Marine Security Guard at Embassies in Kinshasa, Zaire and Panama.

In June 1981, Kent transferred to Fort Benning for Airborne School and Parachute Riggers School at Fort Lee, Virginia. In June 1982, he was assigned as 2nd Air Delivery Platoon Commander, and parachute rigger billets in various commands at Camp Lejeune. Kent was transferred to Marine Corps Recruit Depot San Diego, California, in February 1983 for duty as a drill instructor, senior drill instructor, and battalion drill master with First Battalion. In January 1985, Kent was meritoriously promoted to gunnery sergeant.

Kent transferred to the 3rd Air Delivery Platoon in May 1985 as platoon sergeant. In June 1986, he transferred to Engineer Company, BSSG-1 1st Marine Brigade, Hawaii, as company gunnery sergeant. In March 1988, Kent was assigned to Noncommissioned Officers School, 1st Marine Brigade, as the NCOIC.

Kent transferred to Marine Corps Recruit Depot, Parris Island, South Carolina, in February 1989 as a student at Drill Instructor School. After completion of Drill Instructor School, Kent was assigned to Naval Aviation Officers Candidate School in Pensacola, Florida, as a drill instructor, chief drill instructor, and first sergeant. In February 1990, Kent was promoted to first sergeant and assigned as first sergeant, Marine Aviation and Training Support Group, Pensacola, Florida.

In June 1992, Kent transferred to 4th Marine Regiment for duty. In June 1993, he transferred to the Army Sergeants Major Academy, Fort Bliss, Texas. After graduation, in February 1994, he was transferred and assigned as first sergeant, Battery L, 3rd Battalion, 12th Marines. In December 1994, he assumed the duties as the sergeant major of the 3rd Battalion, 12th Marines.

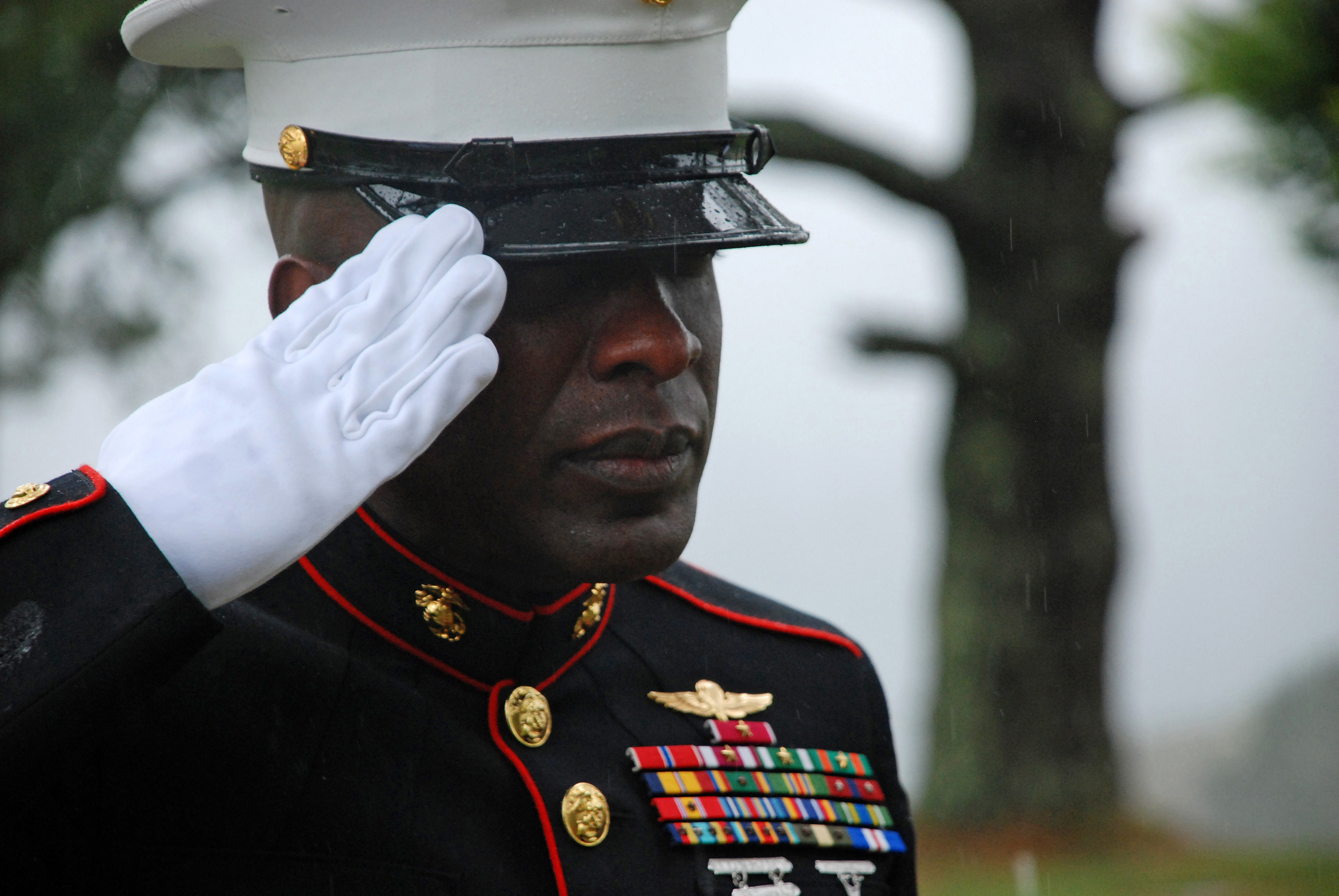
Kent salutes the grave of Sergeant Major Wilbur Bestwick in February 2009.

Kent was transferred to the Marine Corps Recruit Depot, San Diego, California, in August 1997 where he was assigned duties as sergeant major Second Recruit Training Battalion, and, in September 1999, as sergeant major Recruit Training Regiment. In May 2001, he was transferred to Marine Forces Europe/Fleet Marine Force Europe, Stuttgart, Germany, where he was assigned the duties as the sergeant major of Marine Forces Europe/FMF Europe. Kent was transferred to I Marine Expeditionary Force, Camp Pendleton, California, in April 2004 where he served as the sergeant major of the I Marine Expeditionary Force.

On January 19, 2007, General James T. Conway, the Commandant of the Marine Corps, announced that Kent would become the 16th Sergeant Major of the Marine Corps, succeeding John L. Estrada. On April 25, 2007, in a ceremony at the Marine Barracks, Washington, D.C., Kent assumed the top Marine Corps enlisted post. He was succeeded by Micheal Barrett on June 9, 2011, at Marine Barracks, Washington, D.C.

== Personal life ==
Kent is the recipient of the General Gerald C. Thomas Award for inspirational leadership.

Kent is married to "Liz" Kent.

== Awards and decorations ==
Kent holds the rifle expert (3rd award) and pistol sharpshooter marksmanship badges and eight service stripes.

=== Medals and ribbons ===

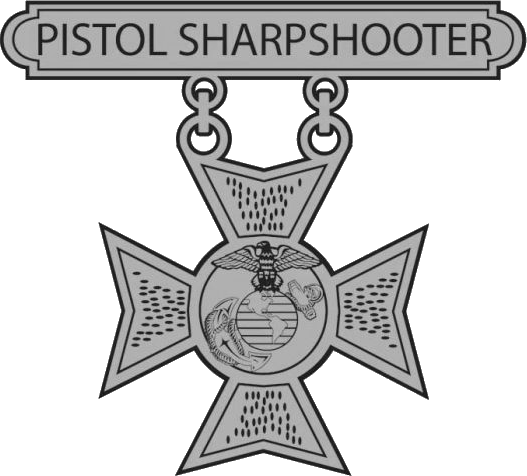

Navy and Marine Corps Parachutist Insignia
| 1st row | | Navy Distinguished Service Medal | Legion of Merit w/ 1 award star | |
| 2nd row | Bronze Star | Meritorious Service Medal w/ 1 award star | Navy and Marine Corps Commendation Medal w/ 1 award star | Navy and Marine Corps Achievement Medal w/ 1 award star |
| 3rd row | Combat Action Ribbon | Navy Unit Commendation w/ 1 service star | Navy Meritorious Unit Commendation | Marine Corps Good Conduct Medal w/ 10 service stars |
| 4th row | National Defense Service Medal w/ 1 service star | Global War on Terrorism Expeditionary Medal | Global War on Terrorism Service Medal | Korea Defense Service Medal |
| 5th row | Navy Sea Service Deployment Ribbon w/ 8 service stars | Navy & Marine Corps Overseas Service Ribbon w/ 3 service stars | Marine Corps Drill Instructor Ribbon w/ 2 service stars | Marine Corps Security Guard Ribbon |
| Badges | Rifle Expert marksmanship badge | | Pistol Sharpshooter marksmanship badge | |

== Notes ==
Military offices
| Preceded by John L. Estrada | Sergeant Major of the Marine Corps; 2007–2011 | Succeeded by Micheal Barrett |
