= Henry H. Black =

United States Marine (1929–2012)

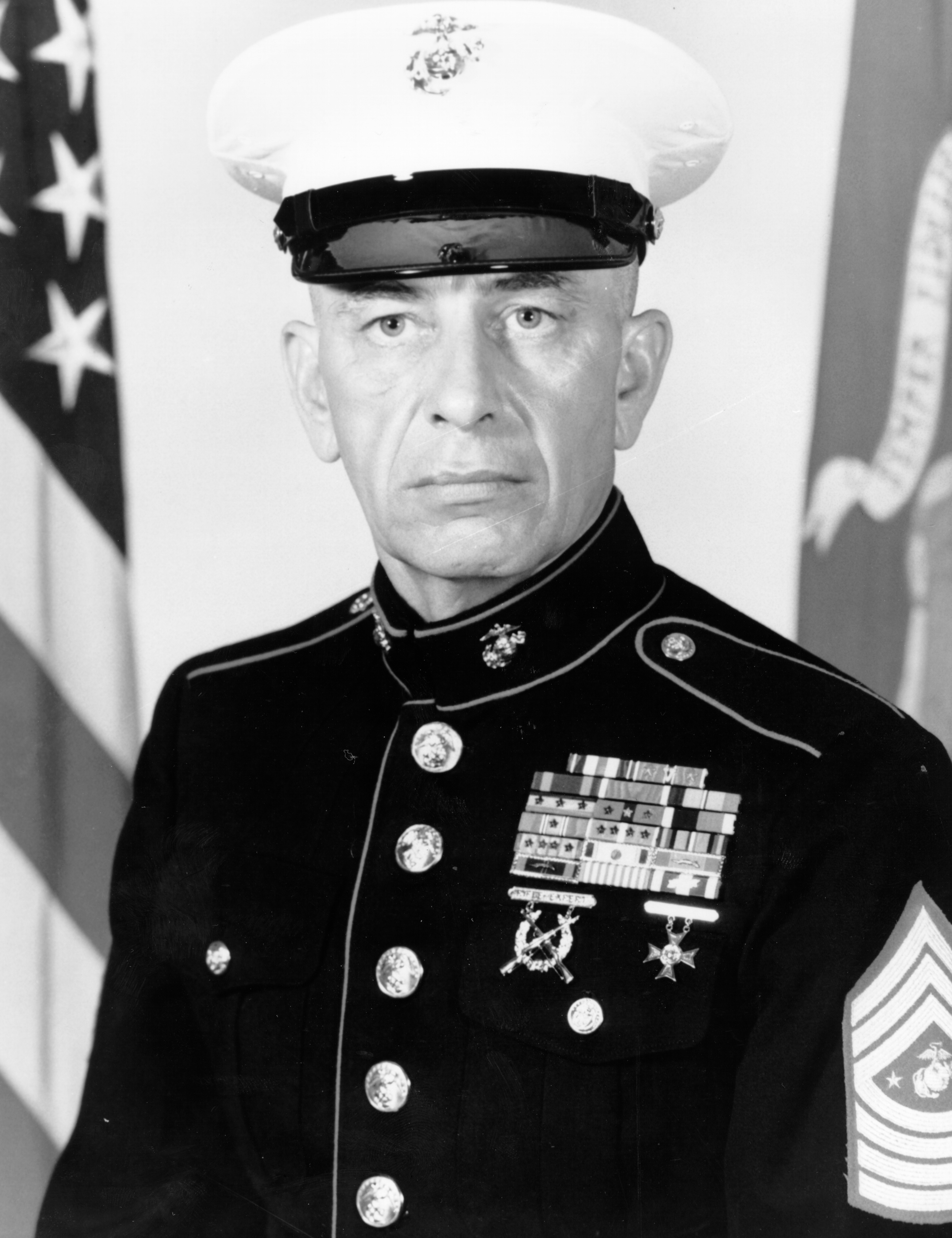
- Sergeant Major Henry H. Black c. 1975
- Born: February 9, 1929; Imperial, Pennsylvania, U.S.
- Died: August 24, 2012 (aged 83); Fredericksburg, Virginia, U.S.
- Military career
- Allegiance: United States
- Branch: United States Marine Corps
- Service years: 1948–1977
- Rank: Sergeant Major
- Commands: Sergeant Major of the Marine Corps
- Conflicts: Korean War; Vietnam War
- Awards: Silver Star; Legion of Merit; Bronze Star Medal (3); Purple Heart; Navy and Marine Corps Achievement Medal

Henry H. Black (February 9, 1929 – August 24, 2012) was a United States Marine who served as the 7th Sergeant Major of the Marine Corps from 1975 to 1977. As of October 2026, Black served as the sergeant major of the Marine Corps with the shortest tenure, at 1 year and 304 days. Ronald L. Green is the longest-tenured, at 4 years and 156 days.

== Early life ==
Henry Black was born in Imperial, Pennsylvania, on February 9, 1929. A high school graduate of Findley High School in 1947, he enlisted in the United States Marine Corps on April 12, 1948, and underwent recruit training at the Marine Corps Recruit Depot Parris Island, South Carolina. He was assigned to the 2nd Marine Division at Camp Lejeune, North Carolina after completing boot camp and served with Company C, 1st Battalion 8th Marines, and later, with Headquarters and Service Company, 1st Battalion 6th Marines.

== Military career ==
Ordered to Korea in 1950, Black joined Company H, 3rd Battalion 1st Marines, 1st Marine Division as the commanding officer's driver. As a private first class, he was awarded the Silver Star and Bronze Star for heroic actions at the Chosin Reservoir. His brother, Albert H. Black, also served in this campaign with him.

Black returned to the United States in May 1951, and was assigned a member of the security force at Marine Barracks, Dahlgren, Virginia. He completed Recruiters School at Parris Island in July 1953, and was assigned as the Noncommissioned Officer-in-Charge, Recruiting Substation, Allentown, Pennsylvania.

Black served as a Platoon Commander of a heavy machine gun platoon with 1st Battalion 9th Marines, 3rd Marine Division in the Western Pacific area from August 1956 to November 1957 when he was ordered to Parris Island to attend Drill Instructor School. Upon completion of the course, he served consecutively as a junior drill instructor, a senior drill instructor, and finally, as a chief drill instructor in the Recruit Training Regiment.

In August 1960 Black was transferred to Wheeling, West Virginia, where he served as Noncommissioned Officer-in-Charge of the Recruiting Substation for the next four years. He served as a Company First Sergeant with Company D, 1st Battalion, 8th Marine Regiment, 2nd Marine Division from August 1964 to November 1965, and landed with the Marines sent to the Dominican Republic during that period.

Ordered to South Vietnam in January 1966, Black served as First Sergeant of Company A, 1st Battalion 1st Marines, 1st Marine Division until February 1967. He was then assigned as First Sergeant of Casual Company, and later, as Sergeant Major, Headquarters Battalion, Marine Corps Development and Education Command, Quantico. Black began his second Vietnam tour in June 1969, serving as Sergeant Major of the 2nd Battalion 7th Marines, 1st Marine Division. He was awarded his second and third Bronze Star Medals during his tour.

Returning to the United States in April 1970, Black was assigned as Sergeant Major of the Recruiting Station in Richmond, Virginia. He remained in that billet until August 1972, when he was transferred to Bremerton, Washington, as Sergeant Major of the Marine Barracks there.

Black was ordered to Iwakuni, Japan, in November 1973, as Sergeant Major of the 1st Marine Aircraft Wing until November 1974, when he returned to the Marine Corps Development and Education Command as Sergeant Major of that command until his selection as Sergeant Major of the Marine Corps. Black assumed the post of 7th Sergeant Major of the Marine Corps on June 1, 1975.

== Later life ==
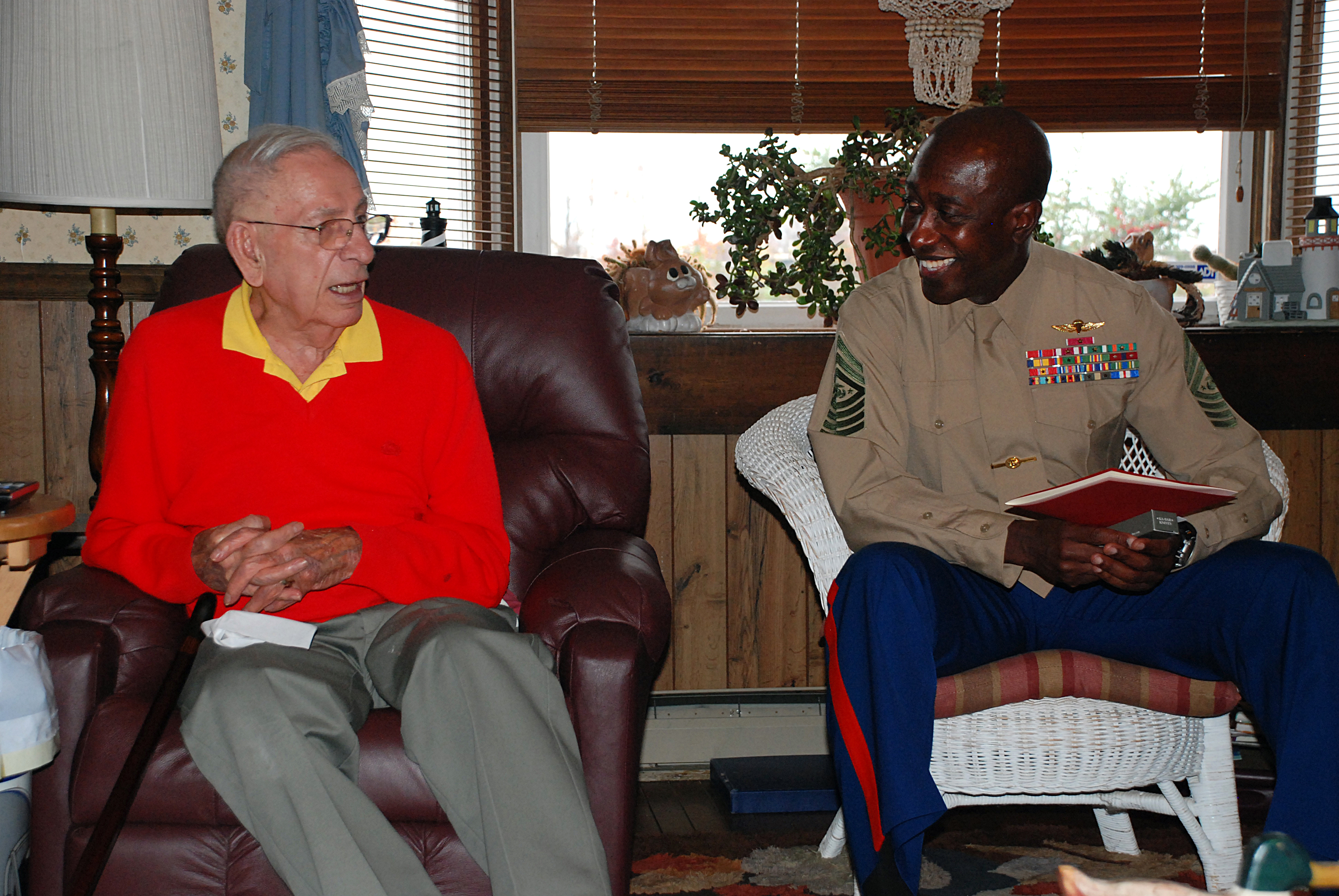
Black with Sgt Major Carlton W. Kent in 2009

Black died at his home in Fredericksburg, Virginia, on August 24, 2012.

== Awards and honors ==
Black's military decorations include:

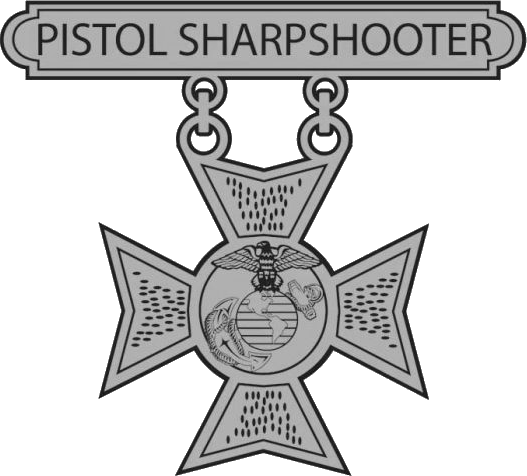

| 1st Row | Silver Star | Legion of Merit | | Bronze Star w/ valor device & 2 award stars |
| 2nd Row | Purple Heart | Navy and Marine Corps Achievement Medal | Combat Action Ribbon | Navy Presidential Unit Citation w/ 3 service stars |
| 3rd Row | Marine Corps Good Conduct Medal w/ 7 service stars | Navy Occupation Service Medal | National Defense Service Medal w/ 1 service star | Korean Service Medal w/ 4 service stars |
| 4th Row | Armed Forces Expeditionary Medal | Vietnam Service Medal w/ 4 service stars | Korean Presidential Unit Citation | Vietnam Gallantry Cross unit citation |
| 5th Row | Vietnam Civil Actions unit citation | United Nations Korea Medal | Vietnam Campaign Medal | Korean War Service Medal |
| Badges | Rifle Expert marksmanship badge | | Pistol Sharpshooter marksmanship badge | |

=== Silver Star citation ===
Citation:

The President of the United States of America takes pleasure in presenting the Silver Star to Corporal Henry H. Black (MCSN: 667269), United States Marine Corps, for conspicuous gallantry and intrepidity while serving as a Jeep Driver of Headquarters and Service Company, Third Battalion, First Marines, FIRST Marine Division (Reinforced), during operations against enemy aggressor forces in Korea on 28 November 1950. Observing that a 60-mm. mortar section was rapidly exhausting its supply of ammunition during a fierce attack against his company's positions by numerically superior enemy forces, Corporal Black accompanied by a fellow Marine voluntarily completed two trips to the company ammunition dump, which had been overrun by the enemy, and returning on foot on each occasion, brought back mortar ammunition in the face of a continued enemy barrage of small arms, machine gun and mortar fire. Risking his life again, he led his companion through the enemy penetration, obtained a jeep and trailer, assisted in loading the vehicles with ammunition and boldly drove through the intense fire to his company command post. By his daring initiative, aggressive determination and courageous efforts in the face of extreme peril, Corporal Black contributed materially to the successful repulse of the attackers and upheld the highest traditions of the United States Naval Service.

Military offices
| Preceded by Clinton A. Puckett | Sergeant Major of the Marine Corps; 1975–1977 | Succeeded by John R. Massaro |
