= John L. Estrada =

American diplomat & military officer (born 1955)

John Estrada
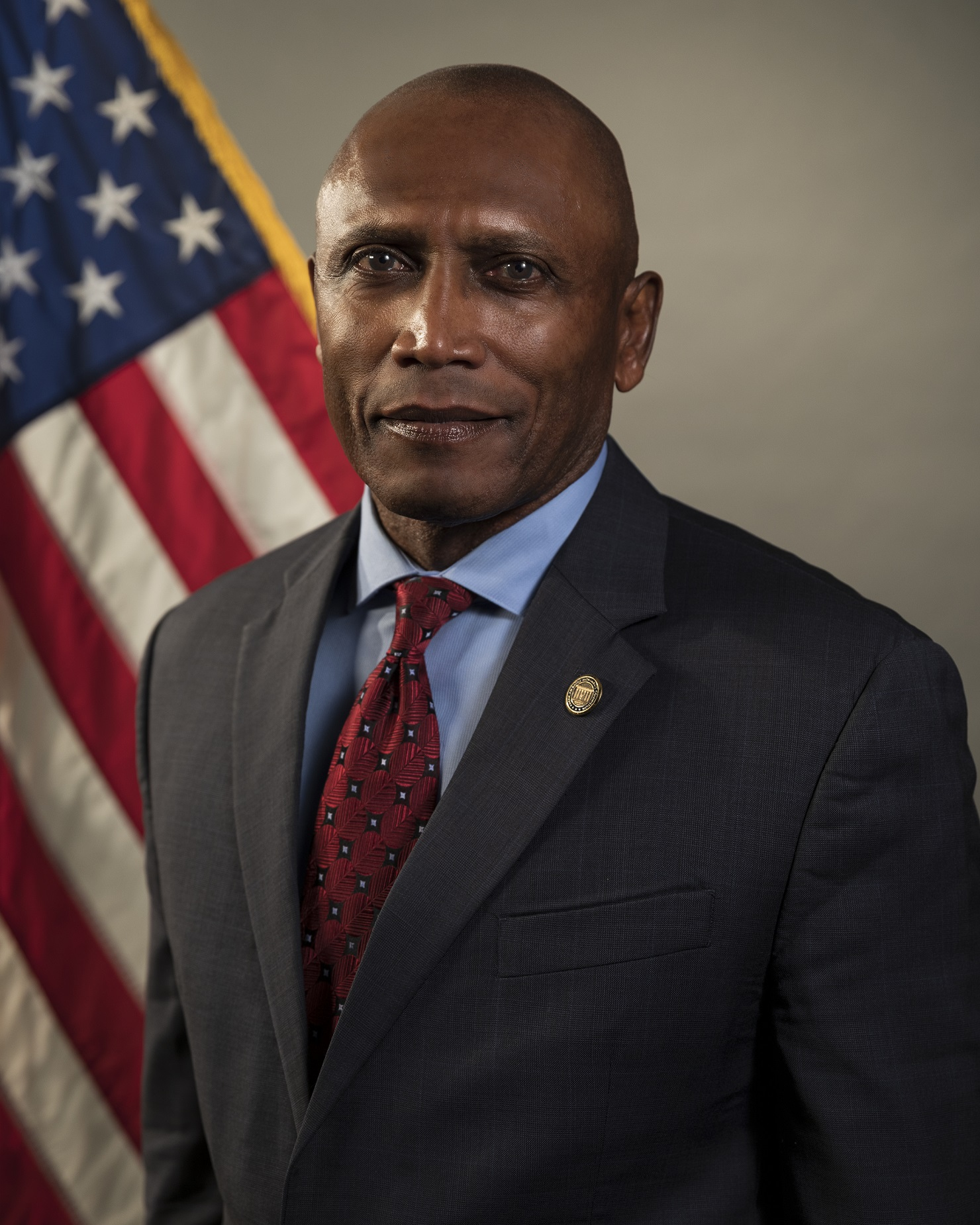
- Estrada in 2022

United States Ambassador to Trinidad and Tobago
- In office April 19, 2016 – January 20, 2017
- President: Barack Obama
- Preceded by: Margaret Diop (acting)
- Succeeded by: Joseph Mondello

15th Sergeant Major of the Marine Corps
- In office June 26, 2003 – April 25, 2007
- President: George W. Bush
- Preceded by: Alford L. McMichael
- Succeeded by: Carlton Kent

Personal details
- Born: September 27, 1955 (age 70) Laventille, Trinidad and Tobago
- Spouse: Elizabeth Cote
- Occupation: Marine, ambassador
- Website: Embassy website

Military service
- Allegiance: United States
- Branch/service: United States Marine Corps
- Years of service: 1973–2007
- Rank: Sergeant Major of the Marine Corps
- Battles/wars: Gulf War; Operation Southern Watch; Iraq War
- Awards: Navy Distinguished Service Medal; Bronze Star Medal; Meritorious Service Medal (4); Navy and Marine Corps Commendation Medal; Joint Service Achievement Medal; Navy and Marine Corps Achievement Medal

John Learie Estrada (born September 27, 1955) is the former United States Ambassador to Trinidad and Tobago and a former United States Marine who served as the 15th sergeant major of the Marine Corps from 2003 to 2007. Estrada stepped down from that post on April 25, 2007, turning over the billet to the next sergeant major, Carlton Kent. Estrada then retired from the military in June 2007, after over 33 years of service. He has also worked as a senior manager for Lockheed Martin Training Solutions from 2008 onward.

Estrada was nominated to be the United States Ambassador to Trinidad and Tobago in July 2013, was approved for the position on February 12, 2016, and became the ambassador on March 17.

== Early life and education ==
Estrada was born in Laventille, Trinidad and Tobago on September 27, 1955. He immigrated to the United States as a teenager and became a naturalized citizen in 1988.

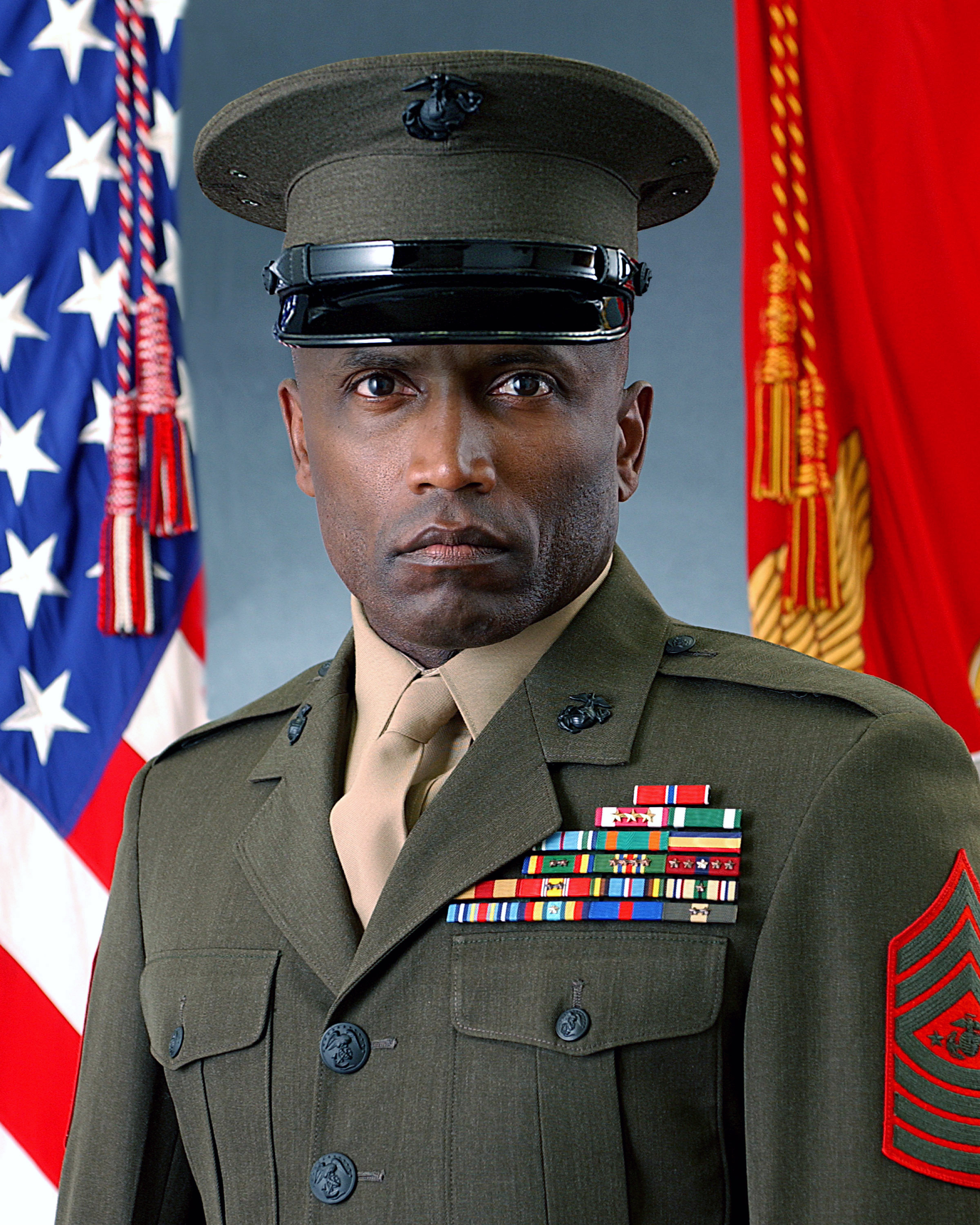
Estrada as the Sergeant Major of the U.S. Marine Corps.

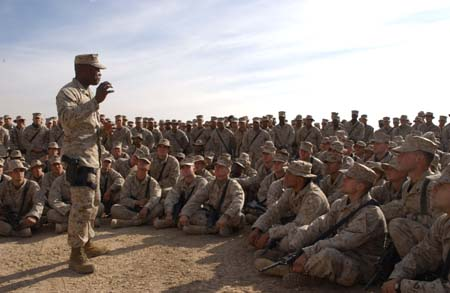
Estrada orating to U.S. Marines at the Iraqi city of Fallujah in 2005.

Estrada in a U.S. State Department video.

== Military career ==
Estrada enlisted in the United States Marine Corps on September 19, 1973, and attended recruit training at Marine Corps Recruit Depot Parris Island in South Carolina. After completing F-4 aircraft maintenance schools at Naval Air Station Memphis, and Marine Corps Air Station Cherry Point, North Carolina, Private First Class Estrada was assigned to VMFA-451 at Marine Corps Air Station Beaufort, South Carolina in March 1974.

In December 1974, Lance Corporal Estrada was transferred to VMFA-232, 1st Marine Aircraft Wing, Marine Corps Air Station Iwakuni, Japan. He was meritoriously promoted to corporal in March 1975. In February 1976, Sergeant Estrada served with VMFAT-101, Marine Corps Air Station Yuma, Arizona. In September 1977, he transferred to VMFA-314, Marine Corps Air Station El Toro, CA. Reassigned to VMFA-323 in December 1978, he deployed with the squadron in November 1979 for 7 months aboard the aircraft carrier USS Coral Sea to the Western Pacific and Persian Gulf. In June 1980, Staff Sergeant Estrada transferred to VMFA-321, Marine Aircraft Group 41, Detachment "A" at Andrews Air Force Base, Maryland.

In August 1982, Staff Sergeant Estrada was ordered to drill instructor duty at Marine Corps Recruit Depot San Diego, where he served with Kilo Company, 3rd Recruit Training Battalion. He was meritoriously promoted to gunnery sergeant in January 1984. In October, Estrada returned to Beaufort for duty with VMFA-251 as the non-commissioned officer in charge of the Airframes Division. In November 1985, he was reassigned to VMFA-451 and deployed to the Western Pacific from January to July 1986 under the Unit Deployment Program. From January to March 1987, Estrada attended aircraft maintenance schools at Naval Air Station Cecil Field and Naval Air Station Jacksonville, Florida, retraining as an FA-18 Hornet hydraulic/structural mechanic.

In October 1987, Estrada returned to drill instructor duty, this time at Parris Island. He served as series chief drill instructor with India Company, 3rd Recruit Training Battalion and subsequently as standing operating procedures instructor and drill master at Drill Instructor School until his promotion to first sergeant in October 1990.

From December 1990 to March 1995, Estrada served as first sergeant for Intelligence Company, 3rd Surveillance Reconnaissance and Intelligence Group, Camp Hansen, Okinawa, Japan; Marine Security Force Company, Norfolk, Virginia; Electronics Maintenance Company, 1st Maintenance Battalion, 1st Force Service Support Group, Camp Pendleton; and Alpha Company, 1st Light Armored Reconnaissance Battalion, 1st Marine Division, Camp Pendleton.

From March 1995 to May 1998, Estrada served as sergeant major for 2nd Battalion, 1st Marine Regiment, 1st Marine Division at Camp Pendleton; and deployed with the 11th Marine Expeditionary Unit (SOC) and 15th Marine Expeditionary Unit (SOC) to the Western Pacific and the Persian Gulf.

In May 1998, Estrada assumed the duties as sergeant major for Recruiting Station Sacramento, California in the 12th Marine Corps District, Western Recruiting Region. From April 2000 to October 2001, Estrada was assigned as sergeant major, Marine Recruit Training Regiment, MCRD Parris Island, South Carolina.

From December 2001 to May 2003, Estrada served as the sergeant major, 3rd Marine Aircraft Wing. During this assignment, he was forward deployed and participated in Operation Southern Watch and Operation Iraqi Freedom.

Estrada assumed his post as the 15th Sergeant Major of the Marine Corps on June 26, 2003, succeeding Alford L. McMichael. On April 25, 2007, Estrada stepped down from his post as Sergeant Major of the Marine Corps, turning over the post to Carlton Kent. Estrada was awarded the Navy Distinguished Service Medal for his service and retired from the Marine Corps in June 2007. In 2010, he completed a Bachelor of Science degree in business management at the University of Phoenix.

== Ambassador to Trinidad and Tobago ==
In July 2013, President Barack Obama nominated Estrada to be the next United States Ambassador to Trinidad and Tobago, the country of Estrada's birth. The United States Senate did not act upon the nomination. Obama renominated Estrada on January 6, 2014. Estrada was approved for the position on February 12, 2016 and became the ambassador on March 17, 2016.

== After retirement ==
In November 2020, Estrada was named a volunteer member of the Joe Biden presidential transition Agency Review Team to support transition efforts related to the United States Department of Defense.

== Personal life ==
Estrada formally endorsed U.S. Senator Barack Obama for President of the United States during a rally at Battery Creek High School in Beaufort, South Carolina on January 24, 2008. On August 28, 2008, Estrada spoke at the Democratic National Convention, echoing his support for Obama, citing his "obligation... to protect the Marines, sailors and their families."

In July 2010, U.S. President Barack Obama nominated Estrada to serve as a commissioner for the American Battle Monuments Commission, the agency overseeing U.S. Armed Forces cemeteries and memorials overseas. Estrada previously served as a committee member of the Defense Advisory Committee on Women in the Services, a member of the Board of Directors for Operation Homefront, and on the executive committee for the United Service Organizations.

In the 2024 United States presidential election, Estrada endorsed Kamala Harris.

== Awards and honors ==
Estrada's personal awards include:

1st row	Navy Distinguished Service Medal	Bronze Star Medal		Meritorious Service Medal w/ 3 award stars
2nd row	Navy and Marine Corps Commendation Medal	Joint Service Achievement Medal	Navy and Marine Corps Achievement Medal	Navy Presidential Unit Citation
3rd row	Navy Unit Commendation w/ 2 service stars	Navy Meritorious Unit Commendation w/ 4 service stars	Marine Corps Good Conduct Medal w/ 10 service stars	Marine Corps Expeditionary Medal
4th row	National Defense Service Medal w/ 2 service stars	Armed Forces Expeditionary Medal	Southwest Asia Service Medal w/ 1 service star	Global War on Terrorism Expeditionary Medal
5th row	Global War on Terrorism Service Medal	Navy Sea Service Deployment Ribbon w/ 5 service stars	Marine Corps Recruiting Ribbon	Marine Corps Drill Instructor Ribbon w/ 2 service stars

=== Notes ===
- Estrada also rates expert in rifle and sharpshooter in pistol marksmanship badges, as well as eight service stripes.

Military offices
Preceded by Alford McMichael	Sergeant Major of the Marine Corps; 2003–2007	Succeeded by Carlton Kent
Diplomatic posts
Preceded by Margaret Diop acting	United States Ambassador to Trinidad and Tobago; 2016–2017	Succeeded by Joseph Mondello
