= Ronald L. Green =

United States Marine (born 1964)

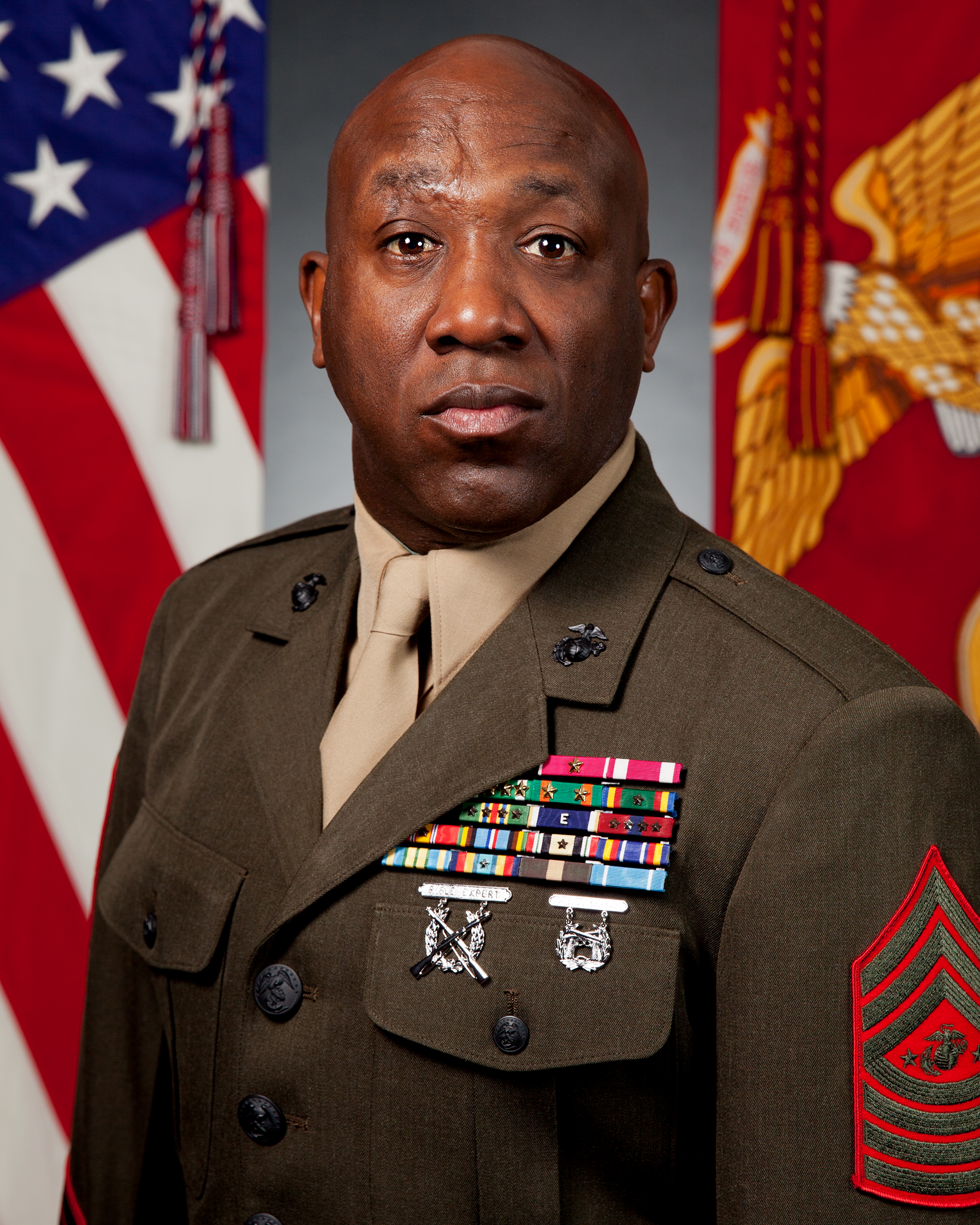
- Green in February 2015
- Born: c. 1964 (age 61–62); Jackson, Mississippi, U.S.
- Military career
- Allegiance: United States
- Branch: United States Marine Corps
- Service years: 1983–2019
- Rank: Sergeant Major of the Marine Corps
- Conflicts: Somali Civil War; Iraq War
- Awards: Navy Distinguished Service Medal; Legion of Merit (3)

Ronald L. Green (born c. 1964) is a United States Marine who served as the 18th Sergeant Major of the Marine Corps. He succeeded Micheal Barrett on February 20, 2015, and relinquished the post to Troy E. Black on July 26, 2019. As the Sergeant Major of the Marine Corps, Green was the highest-ranking non-commissioned officer in the United States Marine Corps. Green retired during the summer of 2019. As of October 2026, Green served as the sergeant major of the Marine Corps with the longest tenure, at 4 years and 156 days. Henry H. Black is the shortest-tenured, at 1 year and 304 days.

== Early life and education ==
Born in Jackson, Mississippi, Green enlisted and began recruit training at Marine Corps Recruit Depot Parris Island, South Carolina, on 27 November 1983. Green holds a Bachelor of Science in Cybersecurity and a Master of Science in Cybersecurity Policy from the University of Maryland University College.

== Military career ==
Green has been meritoriously promoted to the ranks of private first class, lance corporal, corporal, sergeant, and staff sergeant.

Throughout his career, Green has been assigned numerous duties, including field artillery cannoneer; field artillery nuclear projectileman; tower operator; drill instructor, senior drill instructor and drill master; battery section chief and battery gunnery sergeant, Assistant Marine Officer Instructor at Southern University and A&M College; first sergeant of Inspector-Instructor Staff, B Company, 1st Battalion, 23rd Marine Regiment; and sergeant major of Headquarters Marine Corps Henderson Hall, United States Marine Corps Forces, Europe/Marine Corps Forces Africa and 1st Marine Expeditionary Force.

Green has deployed to Somalia with the 13th Marine Expeditionary Unit (Special Operations Capable) during Operation Restore Hope in 1993; to South America in support of Operation United Americas (UNITAS) in 2002; and with Marine Light Attack Helicopter Squadron 169 in support of the Iraq War's Operation Iraqi Freedom in 2006.

Green co-authored the NATO non-commissioned officer’s professional military education reference curriculum.

== Personal life ==
Green serves on the board of directors for T.A.P.S. and is a senior manager in the cybersecurity department at Southwest Airlines.

== Awards and decorations ==

1st row	Navy Distinguished Service Medal			
2nd row	Legion of Merit with 2 gold award stars	Meritorious Service Medal	Navy and Marine Corps Commendation Medal w/ 4 award stars	Navy and Marine Corps Achievement Medal w/ 2 award stars
3rd row	Navy Unit Commendation w/ 1 bronze service star	Navy Meritorious Unit Commendation w/ 4 service stars	Navy E Ribbon w/ 1 Battle "E" device	Marine Corps Good Conduct Medal w/ 10 service stars
4th row	National Defense Service Medal w/ 1 service star	Armed Forces Expeditionary Medal	Iraq Campaign Medal w/ 1 campaign star	Global War on Terrorism Service Medal
5th row	Military Outstanding Volunteer Service Medal	Navy Sea Service Deployment Ribbon w/ 5 service stars	Marine Corps Drill Instructor Ribbon	United Nations Medal
Badges	Rifle expert marksmanship badge (several awards)		Pistol expert marksmanship badge	

- Green has earned 8 service stripes.

Military offices
Preceded by Micheal P. Barrett	Sergeant Major of the Marine Corps; 2015–2019	Succeeded by Troy E. Black
