= Micheal Barrett =

17th Sergeant Major of the Marine Corps

Micheal P. Barrett
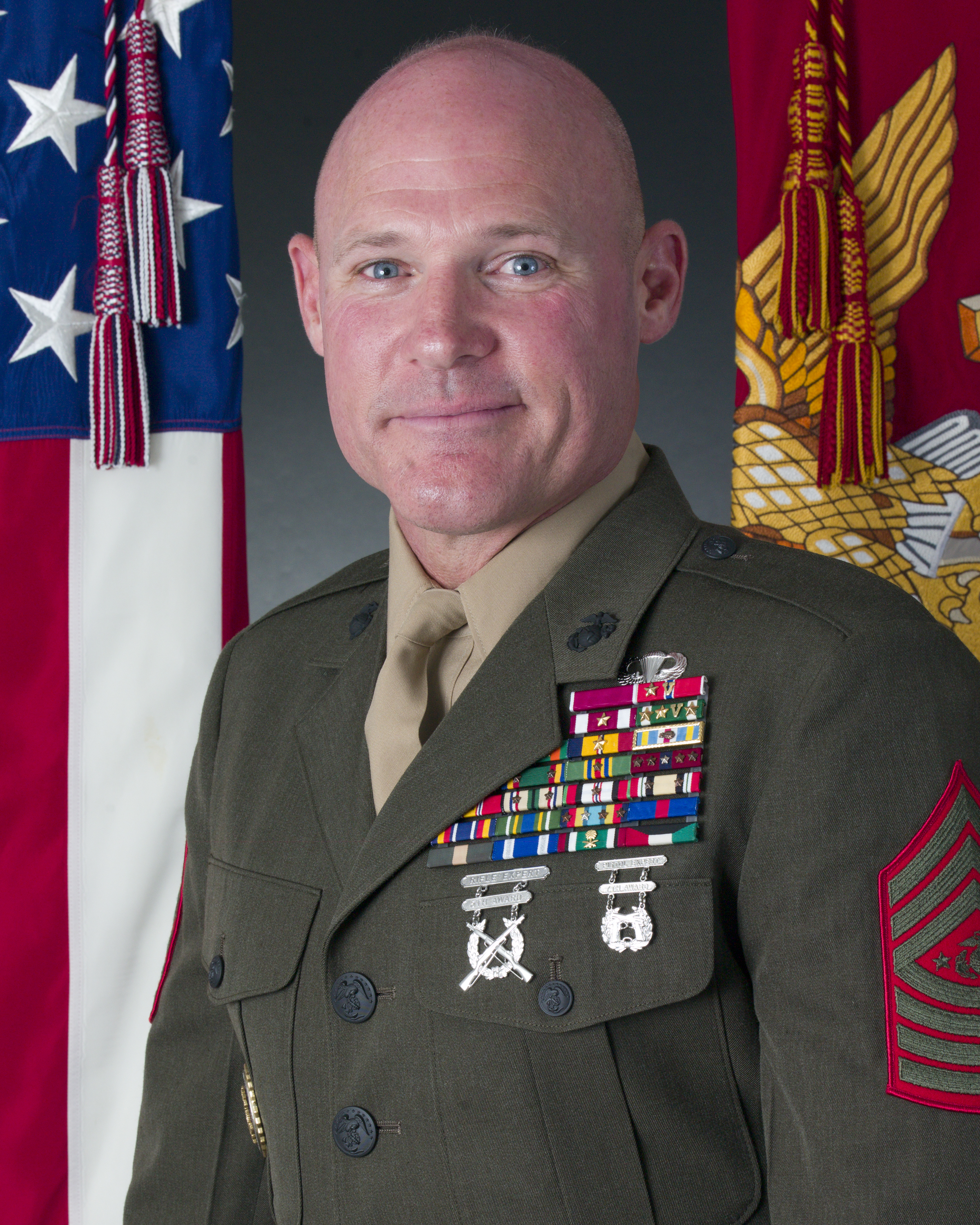
- Barrett in June 2011
- Born: April 5, 1963 (age 63); Youngstown, New York, U.S.
- Military career
- Allegiance: United States
- Branch: United States Marine Corps
- Service years: 1981–2015
- Rank: Sergeant Major of the Marine Corps
- Nickname: Mike
- Conflicts: Gulf War; Iraq War; War in Afghanistan
- Awards: Navy Distinguished Service Medal; Legion of Merit; Bronze Star Medal (2); Meritorious Service Medal (2); Navy and Marine Corps Commendation Medal (4); Navy and Marine Corps Achievement Medal (3)

Micheal P. "Mike" Barrett (born April 5, 1963) is a retired United States Marine who served as the 17th Sergeant Major of the Marine Corps, succeeding Carlton W. Kent on June 9, 2011. As the Sergeant Major of the Marine Corps, Barrett was the highest ranking noncommissioned officer in the United States Marine Corps. He was succeeded by Ronald L. Green on February 20, 2015.

== Early life and education ==
Barrett was born on April 5, 1963, and grew up in the Western New York town of Youngstown. He enlisted in the United States Marine Corps at the age of 17, on March 16, 1981, and underwent recruit training at Delta Company, 2nd Recruit Training Battalion Parris Island.

== Military career ==
In November 1981, Barrett completed the School of Infantry at Marine Corps Base Camp Lejeune. He was ordered to 1st Battalion, 4th Marines in Marine Corps Air Ground Combat Center Twentynine Palms for duty. He attended Ranger School, and served as a rifleman, grenadier, fireteam leader, squad leader, and platoon sergeant, meritoriously promoted up to the rank of sergeant. He met his wife Susan there, marrying her in August 1984, and then transferred the same month to serve as an Inspector-Instructor for 2nd Battalion, 25th Marines at New Rochelle, New York. Outside of his primary duties as an infantry instructor, he was assigned numerous support duties to include; Armorer, Nuclear Biological Chemical noncommissioned officer, and Training Chief.

In September 1987, Barrett was assigned to 3rd Battalion, 9th Marines at Marine Corps Base Camp Pendleton, and trained as a Scout Sniper to serve as a platoon sergeant for the unit's STA platoon. As a staff sergeant, he was deployed to Saudi Arabia and Kuwait for the Gulf War, earning a Navy and Marine Corps Commendation Medal with a valor device for engaging enemy mortar positions with his Barrett M82 sniper rifle in early 1991.

Barrett was assigned to Marine Corps Recruit Depot San Diego as a drill instructor in April 1992, and promoted to gunnery sergeant in 1994. In January 1995, he was transferred to Marine Corps Base Quantico to serve as the chief instructor at the Scout Sniper Instructor School, and then as the senior enlisted advisor for the Marine Security Company at Camp David and liaison with the United States Secret Service in September 1996.

Promoted to first sergeant in 1998, Barrett was transferred to 3rd Battalion, 4th Marines at Twentynine Palms, serving as the company first sergeant for Company I, Headquarters and Service Company, and Weapons Company. He was then promoted to sergeant major in mid-2002 and sent to Recruiting Station Cleveland from July 2002 until May 2005.

Barrett deployed to Iraq twice with 2nd Battalion, 7th Marines in 2005 and 2007, earning a Bronze Star Medal with valor device on each tour for leadership under fire. From October 2007 to May 2009, he was stationed again in Quantico, at the Officer Candidates School. He was then selected as the sergeant major of 1st Marine Division in June 2009, and deployed to Afghanistan as the I Marine Expeditionary Force/Regional Command Southwest sergeant major in March 2010.

On April 11, 2011, the Commandant of the Marine Corps, General James F. Amos, announced that Barrett would serve as the 17th Sergeant Major of the Marine Corps. He succeeded Carlton W. Kent on June 9, 2011, at Marine Barracks, Washington, D.C.

Controversy erupted on April 11, 2014, when Barrett told a Senate Armed Services Committee panel that Marines should be paid less. According to Barrett, "I truly believe it will raise discipline. You'll have better spending habits. You won't be so wasteful." Barrett argued that overly high pay and benefits will transform the Marines into an organization of entitlement, rather than a war-fighting organization. Barrrett issued a letter to all Marines to explain his congressional testimony, "Recent reporting of my testimony may have left you with a mistaken impression that I don't care about your quality of life and that I support lower pay for service members. This is not true," Barrett wrote in the letter. However, he maintained that the growth in pay and benefits must be slowed in order to ensure the Corps can pay for better equipment.

On January 20, 2015, General Joseph F. Dunford, Jr. announced that Barrett would be succeeded as Sergeant Major of the Marine Corps on February 20, 2015, by Sergeant Major Ronald L. Green.

== Awards and decorations ==
Barrett has earned the following awards:

| Basic Parachutist Insignia | | | | Presidential Service Badge |
| Navy Distinguished Service Medal | Legion of Merit | | Bronze Star w/ 1 award star & Combat V | Presidential Service Badge |
| Meritorious Service Medal w/ 1 award star | Navy and Marine Corps Commendation Medal w/ valor device & 3 award stars | Navy and Marine Corps Achievement Medal w/ 2 award stars | Combat Action Ribbon w/ 1 award star | Presidential Service Badge |
| Joint Meritorious Unit Award w/ 1 oak leaf cluster | Navy Unit Commendation w/ 2 service stars | Navy Meritorious Unit Commendation w/ 1 service star | Marine Corps Good Conduct Medal w/ 10 service stars | Presidential Service Badge |
| National Defense Service Medal w/ 1 service star | Southwest Asia Service Medal w/ 2 campaign stars | Afghanistan Campaign Medal w/ 1 campaign star | Iraq Campaign Medal w/ 2 campaign stars | Presidential Service Badge |
| Global War on Terrorism Service Medal | Korea Defense Service Medal | Navy Sea Service Deployment Ribbon w/ 8 service stars | Marine Corps Recruiting Ribbon | Presidential Service Badge |
| Marine Corps Drill Instructor Ribbon | NATO Medal for Service with ISAF | Kuwait Liberation Medal (Saudi Arabia) | Kuwait Liberation Medal (Kuwait) | Presidential Service Badge |
| RIFLE EXPERT Badge (5TH AWARD) | | PISTOL EXPERT Badge (7TH AWARD) | | Presidential Service Badge |

- 8 service stripes.

Military offices
| Preceded by Carlton W. Kent | Sergeant Major of the Marine Corps; 2011–2015 | Succeeded by Ronald L. Green |
