= William G. Joslyn =

American Major General (1922–2011)

William George Joslyn
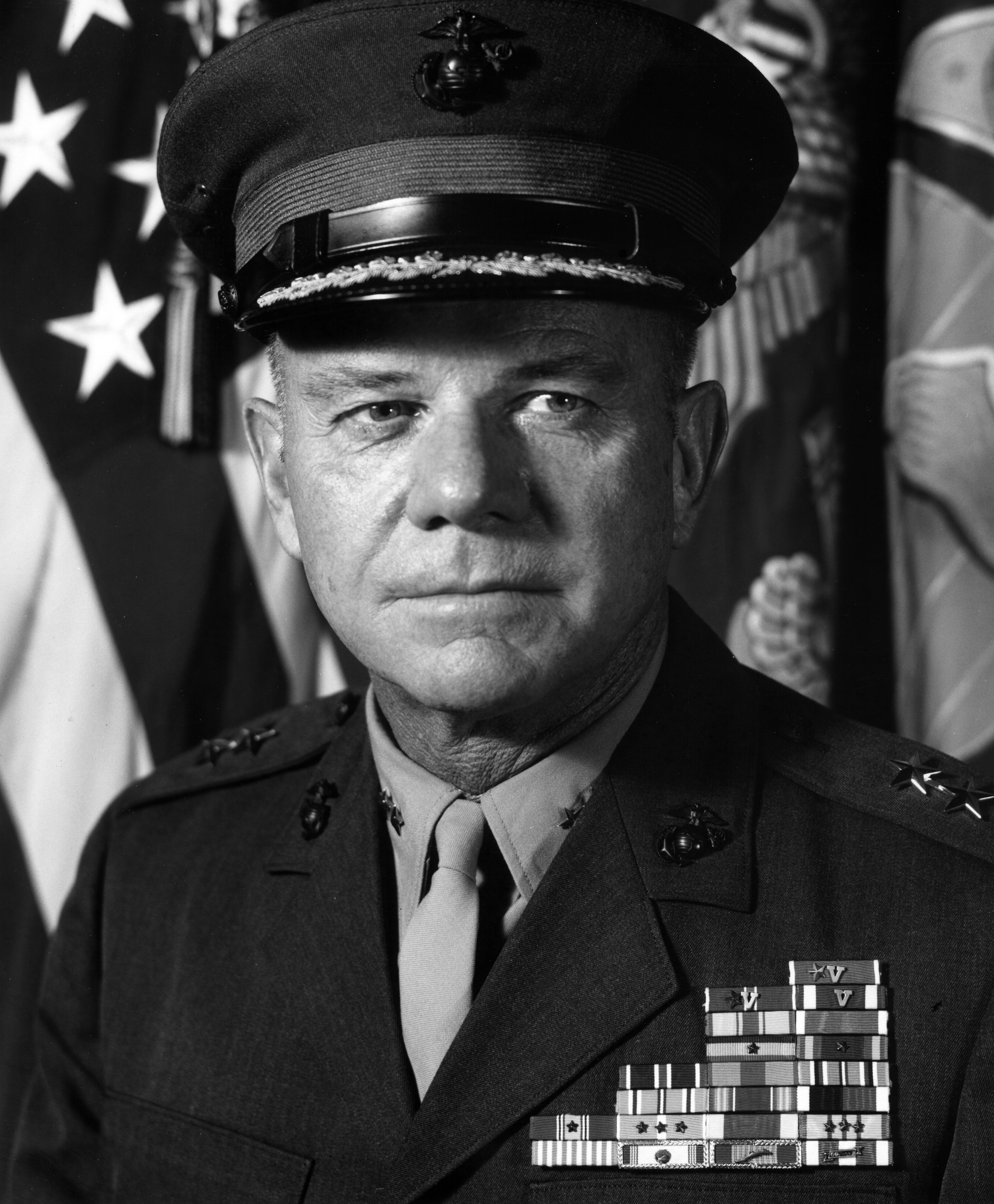
- Major general William G. Joslyn, USMC
- Born: March 14, 1922; San Francisco, California, U.S.
- Died: December 22, 2011 (aged 89); La Jolla, California, U.S.
- Burial place: Fort Rosecrans National Cemetery
- Military career
- Allegiance: United States
- Branch: United States Marine Corps
- Service years: 1942–1976
- Rank: Major general
- Service number: 0-36836
- Commands: 2nd Marine Division; Marine Corps Base 29 Palms; CoS of III MAF; Recruit Training Regiment; 1st Battalion, 6th Marines
- Conflicts: World War II; Korean War; Vietnam War
- Awards: Legion of Merit (3); Bronze Star Medal (2); Purple Heart; Commendation Medal (2)

William George Joslyn (March 14, 1922 – December 22, 2011) was a decorated officer in the United States Marine Corps with the rank of major general. A veteran of three wars, Joslyn distinguished himself in the Korean War and rose to the rank of general during the Vietnam War. He completed his career as commanding general, 2nd Marine Division.

Joslyn was also an athlete and competed in American football during his studies at high school and later at Stanford University. He was drafted by the NFL's Washington Redskins in 1944.

== Early career ==
Joslyn was born in San Francisco, California, as the son of William and Elizabeth Joslyn. He attended Grant Grammar School and Lowell High School there, where he captained the undefeated 1939 city championship football team. Following graduation in summer 1940, Joslyn enrolled in Stanford University and was active again on the university football team as a brilliant running back and was also drafted by the NFL's Washington Redskins in 1944.

With the increasing need of Marine officers during World War II, the United States Navy established V-12 College Training Program in early 1942. Joslyn enrolled in the program and simultaneously enlisted the Marine Corps Reserve in April 1942. He attended the regular summer boot camps at Marine Barracks Parris Island, South Carolina, and following graduation with a Bachelor of Arts from the university in summer 1943, he attended the Officer Candidate Course at Quantico, Virginia.

He was commissioned a second lieutenant on April 12, 1944, and ordered to the Basic School at Quantico for duty as an instructor. Joslyn spent one year there before he was promoted to first lieutenant and ordered to the Pacific area in June 1945. There he was attached as platoon leader to the 2nd Marine Division under Major General LeRoy P. Hunt at Okinawa, and, following the surrender of Japan, he participated in the occupation duty at Kyushu.

Joslyn returned to the United States in September 1946 and assumed duty as supply and executive officer with the Marine barracks at Naval Air Station Oakland, California. He served in this capacity until June 1949, when he was transferred to the Headquarters Marine Corps in Washington, D.C. Joslyn served in the Personnel Department under Major General John T. Walker and was promoted to captain in January 1951.

== Postwar career ==
=== Korean War ===
Joslyn was ordered to Korea in April 1952 and assumed duty as operations officer with 1st Battalion, 1st Marines. He participated with his unit in the defensive actions on main line of resistance (MLR) near Panmunjon and later was sent to the 1st Marine Division's reserve. The 1st Battalion took part in the amphibious exercise and returned to the MLR in July of that year.

One month later, Joslyn took part in the battle of Bunker Hill and held that position despite several enemy counterattacks. He later assumed command of Company "B" and participated in the defense combats until March 1953. For his service in Korea, Joslyn was decorated with the Bronze Star Medal with Combat "V", Navy Commendation Medal with Combat "V" and Purple Heart for wounds received in action.

=== 1953–1965 ===
Following his return to the United States in April 1953, Joslyn served for two years as a recruiting officer in Los Angeles, California, and was promoted to the rank of major in December 1954. He served in that capacity until June 1955, when he was sent for instruction to the Amphibious Warfare School at Quantico. Upon completing the junior course in July 1956, Joslyn was ordered to Hawaii, where he joined the headquarters, Fleet Marine Force, Pacific.

He served as Aide-de-Camp to the commanding general, Edwin A. Pollock, and, following Pollock's transfer to Norfolk, Virginia, as commanding general, Fleet Marine Force, Atlantic in November 1957, Joslyn continued as his aide until November 1959, when the new commanding general, Joseph C. Burger attached him to the Fleet Marine Force Operations section as assistant operations officer.

In July 1960, Joslyn was promoted to lieutenant colonel and ordered to Camp Lejeune, North Carolina, for duty with 2nd Marine Division. He served on the divisional staff as assistant division plans officer under Major General James P. Berkeley and later assumed command of 1st Battalion, 6th Marines. Joslyn was ordered to New York City in May 1962 and joined First Marine Corps Reserve District as assistant director for personnel procurement. He completed his tour in December 1963, when he assumed command of the Marine barracks at Mare Island Naval Shipyard, California.

=== Vietnam War ===
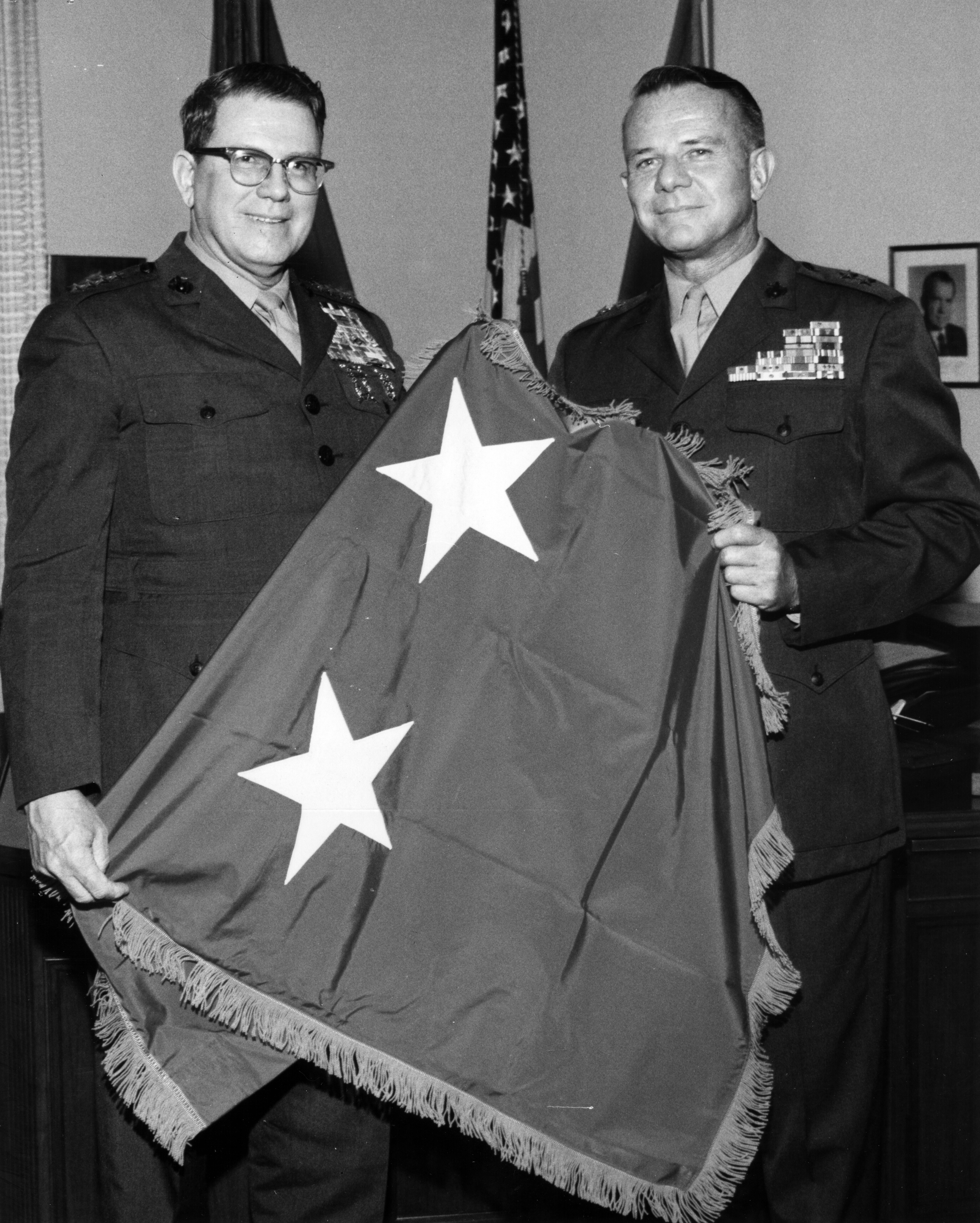
Joslyn during his promotion to major general by Commandant Robert E. Cushman Jr. in Commandant's office, Washington, D.C., May 10, 1974

Joslyn received orders for deployment to South Vietnam in August 1965, when he assumed duty as assistant operations officer, 1st Marine Aircraft Wing under Major General Keith B. McCutcheon. He was stationed in Da Nang and participated in the planning of military operations of all marine aviation in Vietnam. Joslyn helped coordinate the combat strikes of the 1st Marine Aircraft Wing within South Vietnamese air space and received a second Bronze Star Medal with Combat "V" for his service in that country.

He returned to the United States in June 1966 and received promotion to colonel after his arrival. Joslyn then served the staff of Air War College at Maxwell Air Force Base, Alabama, and, due to his recent experience with marine aviation in Vietnam, he was appointed Marine advisor to the commandant of the college. He served next three years in that capacity and received the Air Force Commendation Medal.

Joslyn assumed command of Marine Recruit Training Regiment at San Diego Recruit Depot in June 1969 and was responsible for the reception, processing, and recruit training for male enlisted personnel following initial entry into the Marine Corps. His regiment also provided training for drill instructors and officers entrusted with recruit training responsibilities. He served in this capacity until June 1970 and received the Legion of Merit for his service in that assignment.

One month later, Joslyn was ordered to Okinawa, Japan, where he joined 3rd Marine Division under Major General William K. Jones as chief of staff. However, Joslyn did not remain in Japan for long and moved to South Vietnam at the beginning of December of that year. He succeeded Brigadier General Thomas H. Miller Jr. as chief of staff, III Marine Amphibious Force (III MAF) under his old superior, Lieutenant General Keith B. McCutcheon.

The health of General McCutcheon began to fail just two weeks after Joslyn's arrival, and he was soon relieved by Donn J. Robertson. Joslyn was promoted to the rank of brigadier general on February 1, 1971, and continued in capacity as chief of staff, III MAF. He took part in the Operation Lam Son 719 during February and March 1971, when force units provided air support for the operation. Due to the change of U.S. policy and ordered withdrawal of Marine troops, Joslyn was co-responsible for the redeployment of III Marine Amphibious Force to Okinawa, Japan. He left Vietnam on April 14, 1971, and spent next three months on Okinawa, Japan. For his service in South Vietnam, Joslyn was decorated with the Legion of Merit with Combat "V" and National Order of Vietnam, rank Knight by the Government of South Vietnam.

Joslyn returned to the United States in July 1971 and assumed duty as deputy assistant chief of staff for operations (G-3) at Headquarters Marine Corps. He remained in that capacity until April 1973 and then assumed command of Marine Corps Base 29 Palms and also held dual command as commanding general, Force Troops, Fleet Marine Force, Pacific. In this capacity, he was responsible for all independent units under FMFPAC such as support artillery units, antiaircraft artillery units, military police battalions, separate engineer units and other miscellaneous force units.

He was promoted to the rank of major general on May 10, 1974, and assumed command of 2nd Marine Division at Camp Lejeune, North Carolina. The division under Joslyn's command conducted intensive training in cold-weather and mountain warfare in Sierra Nevada and jungle warfare training in Panama. He commanded the division until July 1, 1976, when he retired from active service after 34 years of service. Joslyn received his third Legion of Merit for service with 2nd Marine Division.

== Retirement ==
Joslyn then settled in California and worked as a vice president for Merrill Lynch, then an independent company. He was inducted into the San Francisco Prep Hall of Fame in 1993, which publicly recognize those athletes who had demonstrated outstanding performances and leadership, while competing for their respective high schools. Joslyn was also active in the Marine Corps Oral History Program and received a Certificate of Appreciation from the Commandant of the Marine Corps, Paul X. Kelley in June 1986.

Major General William G. Joslyn died on December 22, 2011, in La Jolla, California, and is buried at Fort Rosecrans National Cemetery together with his wife, Barbara Ruth Williams.

== Decorations ==
A complete list of the general's medals and decorations include:

1st Row	Legion of Merit with Combat "V" with two 5/16" Gold Stars			
2nd Row	Bronze Star Medal with Combat "V" with one 5/16" Gold Star	Navy Commendation Medal with Combat "V"	Air Force Commendation Medal	Purple Heart
3rd Row	Navy Presidential Unit Citation with one star	Navy Unit Commendation with one star	Air Force Outstanding Unit Award	Marine Corps Expeditionary Medal
4th Row	American Campaign Medal	Asiatic-Pacific Campaign Medal	World War II Victory Medal	Navy Occupation Service Medal
5th Row	National Defense Service Medal with one star	Korean Service Medal with three 3/16 inch bronze service stars	Vietnam Service Medal with three 3/16 inch bronze service stars	National Order of Vietnam, Knight
6th Row	United Nations Korea Medal	Republic of Korea Presidential Unit Citation	Vietnam Gallantry Cross Unit Citation with Palm	Vietnam Campaign Medal

== See also ==
- III Marine Amphibious Force
- List of 2nd Marine Division Commanders

Military offices
Preceded by William H. Lanagan Jr.	Commanding General, 2nd Marine Division; May 16, 1974 - June 30, 1976	Succeeded by Kenneth McLennan
Preceded by Kenneth J. Houghton	Commanding General, Marine Corps Base 29 Palms; May 1, 1973 – May 1, 1974	Succeeded by Clarence H. Schmid
