= Alford L. McMichael =

Sergeant Major of the US Marine Corps

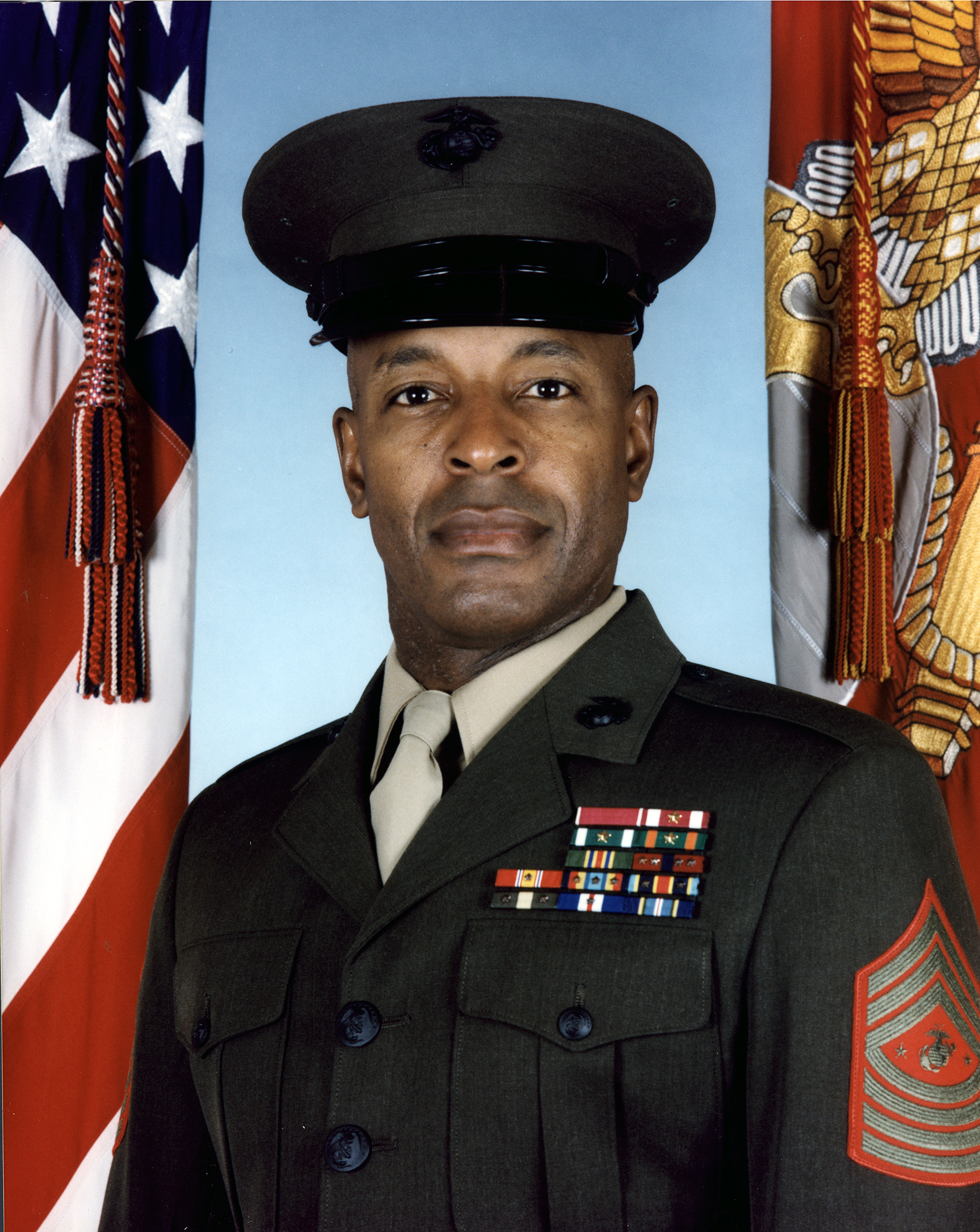
- McMichael as Sergeant Major of the Marine Corps
- Born: February 24, 1952 (age 74); Hot Springs, Arkansas, U.S.
- Military career
- Allegiance: United States
- Branch: United States Marine Corps
- Service years: 1970–2006
- Rank: Sergeant Major of the Marine Corps
- Awards: Navy Distinguished Service Medal; Legion of Merit; Meritorious Service Medal (2); Navy and Marine Corps Commendation Medal (2); Navy and Marine Corps Achievement Medal (2)

Alford L. McMichael (born February 24, 1952) is a retired United States Marine who served as the 14th Sergeant Major of the Marine Corps from 1999 to 2003. He was also the first Staff Non-Commissioned Officer for Allied Command Operations for NATO (2003–2006). McMichael retired from the Marine Corps in 2006 after 36 years of service.

== Early life and education ==
McMichael was born on February 24, 1952 in Hot Springs, Arkansas, and graduated from Hot Springs High School.

== Military career ==
McMichael enlisted in the United States Marine Corps on 27 August 1970, and attended recruit training at San Diego, California. In June 1971, after completing Infantry Training School and Basic Infantry Training at Camp Pendleton, California, McMichael was assigned to Marine Barracks, Pearl Harbor, Hawaii. In May 1973, he was transferred to 2nd Battalion 5th Marines at Camp Pendleton. In December 1973, he returned to Marine Corps Recruit Depot San Diego to serve as a drill instructor, series Gunnery Sergeant, and battalion drill master. In December 1975, he was transferred to 1st Battalion, 7th Marines, at Camp Pendleton.

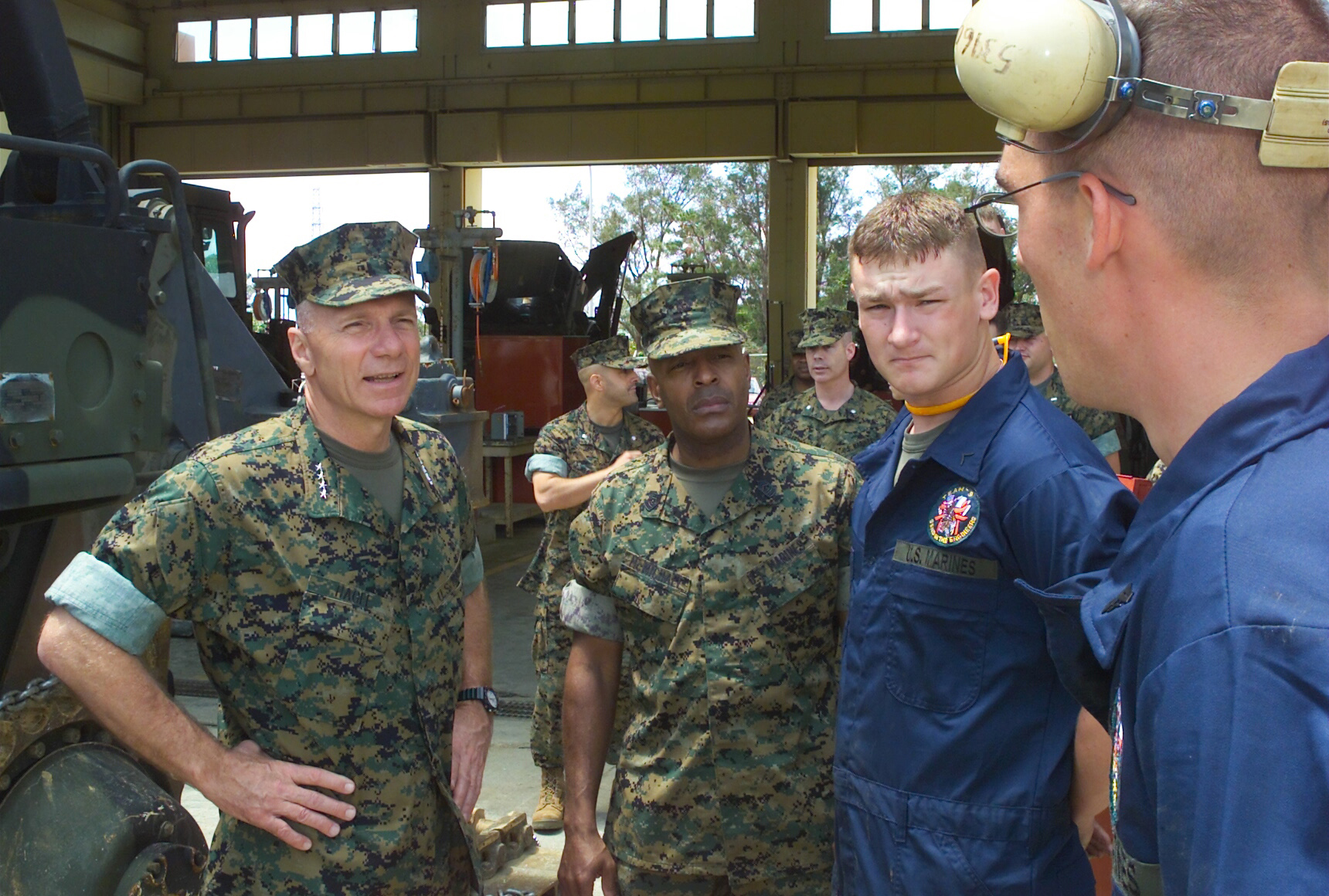
McMichael (center) with General Michael Hagee (left) and personnel from the 9th Engineer Support Battalion in April 2003.

In January 1978, McMichael transferred to the 3rd Marine Division, where he served as a shore party chief with the 3rd Division Support Group. In January 1979, he received orders to Marine Security Guard School and, upon completion of the training, was assigned to the American embassy in Copenhagen, Denmark. He returned to Quantico, Virginia, in May 1981 to serve as an instructor for the Marine Security Guard School.

In May 1983, McMichael was assigned to the University of Minnesota, where he served as the Assistant Marine Officer Instructor for the Naval Reserve Officer Training Corps Program. In December 1984, after completing the Staff Noncommissioned Officers Academy Advanced Course, he was transferred to Okinawa, Japan, to serve as the first sergeant of Company C, 3rd Reconnaissance Battalion. He was ordered to Marine Barracks, Roosevelt Roads in Puerto Rico, in January 1986 to serve as the barracks's first sergeant.

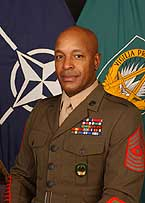
McMichael as Senior Noncommissioned Officer of Allied Command Operations

McMichael served as the director of the Staff Noncommissioned Officers Academy at Marine Corps Air Station El Toro, California from May 1989 to May 1991, after having served as the school's deputy director since August 1988. In May 1991, McMichael was transferred to Quantico again, where he served as the sergeant major of Officer Candidates School.

In June 1994, McMichael returned to Okinawa, Japan, where he served as the sergeant major of the 31st Marine Expeditionary Unit until July 1995, when he was reassigned as the sergeant major of the 1st Marine Aircraft Wing. From January 1997 to June 1999, he served as the sergeant major for Manpower and Reserve Affairs Division, Headquarters Marine Corps.

On 1 July 1999, McMichael assumed his post as the 14th Sergeant Major of the Marine Corps, becoming the first African-American to hold the post. His tenure as the Sergeant Major of the Marine Corps saw the establishment of the Marine Corps Martial Arts Program and the commencement of the Global War on Terrorism. In June 2003, deferring his planned retirement, McMichael assumed a newly created post as the Senior Non-Commissioned Officer for Allied Command Operations, becoming the senior enlisted advisor to General James L. Jones, Supreme Allied Commander, Europe, and Commander, United States European Command, which was technically a demotion from his previous rank and position. He and General Jones previously served together while the latter was the 32nd Commandant of the Marine Corps. McMichael served in this role from June 2003 until July 17, 2006, when he was succeeded by Army Command Sergeant Major Michael Bartelle. He retired from the Marine Corps shortly after with his highest appointed rank of Sergeant Major of the Marine Corps.

== Personal life ==
McMichael sits on the steering committee of the National Symposium for the Needs of Young Veterans, hosted by AMVETS.

In 2003, the Boys & Girls Clubs of America citing that "the Sergeant Major [had] come a long way from segregated Hot Springs, where the Club was the only colorblind place to play," named McMichael to its "Alumni Hall of Fame." McMichael commented, "The Club gave me those things I use today in the Marine Corps . . . You made a difference in one child’s life." McMichael credits the club, which he joined at age 9, with giving him a vision of what the world should and could be.

In 2008, McMichael's memoirs were published under the title LEADERSHIP: Achieving Life-Changing Success From Within.

== Awards and honors ==
His personal decorations include:

1st Row	Legion of Merit	Meritorious Service Medal w/ 1 service star	Navy and Marine Corps Commendation Medal w/ 1 service star	Navy and Marine Corps Achievement Medal w/ 1 service star
2nd Row	Navy Meritorious Unit Commendation ribbon	U.S. Marine Corps Good Conduct Medal w/ 8 service stars	National Defense Service Medal w/ 1 service star	Navy and Marine Corps Sea Service Deployment Ribbon w/ 3 service stars
3rd Row	Navy and Marine Corps Overseas Service Ribbon ribbon w/ 1 service star	U.S. Marine Corps Drill Instructor Ribbon w/ 2 service stars	Marine Security Guard Ribbon w/ 1 service star	U.S. Coast Guard Special Operations Service Ribbon

== Bibliography ==
- McMichael, Alford L. (2008). LEADERSHIP: Achieving Life-Changing Success From Within.

== See also ==
- Sergeant Major of the Marine Corps

== Notes ==
Military offices
Preceded by Lewis G. Lee	Sergeant Major of the Marine Corps; 1999–2003	Succeeded by John L. Estrada
New title	Senior NCO of Allied Command Operations; 2003–2006	Succeeded by Michael Bartelle
