= 1st Recruit Training Battalion (United States) =

- Active: 1921-present
- Country: United States
- Allegiance: United States of America
- Branch: United States Marine Corps
- Role: Marine Recruit Training
- Part of: Recruit Training Regiment
- Garrison/HQ: Marine Corps Recruit Depot San Diego
- Nickname: Big Red One
- Website: Official website

Commanders
- Current commander: Colonel Peter M. Rummler
- Ceremonial chief: Drill Master

The 1st Recruit Training Battalion is a battalion of the United States Marine Corps which is used to train new enlisted personnel. It is composed of four Training Companies; Alpha, Bravo, Charlie, and Delta. The recruit training battalion is responsible for ensuring that each company is following the procedures set forth by the Recruit Training Regiment. Each company is responsible to follow the standards established by the Commandant of the Marine Corps to train, teach, mentor, and above all lead recruits through a demanding standard-based training system. 51 percent of all male Marines attend recruit training at Marine Corps Recruit Depot San Diego (MCRDSD), California."

== History ==
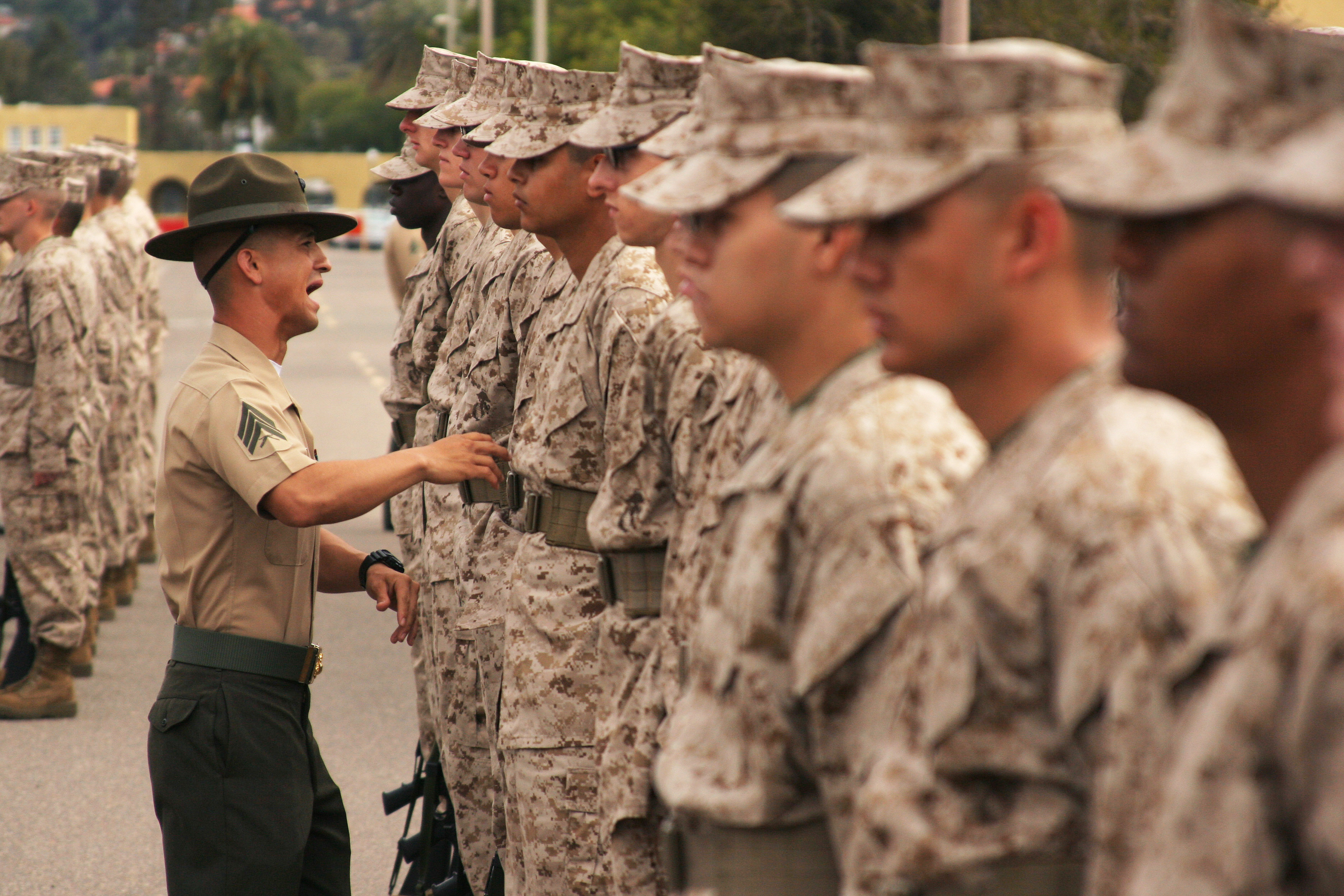
Marine recruits of the 1st Recruit Training Battalion stand in formation for a uniform inspection by a senior drill instructor in 2013

=== 1st Recruit Training ===
"In 1921, the MCRDSD was formally commissioned and in 1923, it became the primary recruiting center for the west coast. During World War II, the flow of recruits into the base surged, with 18,000 recruits arriving in one month. In 1948, the base was formally named Marine Corps Recruit Depot San Diego and was home to the Recruit Training Regiment.

First Recruit training Battalion is one of the three Battalions under the Recruit Training Regiment, whose main mission is to train new United States Marine Corps recruits, specifically males recruited from west of the Mississippi River, but also from some areas east of the river, such as Wisconsin, Michigan, the Chicago metropolitan area and New Orleans. Recruit training includes a thirteen-week process during which the recruit becomes cut off from the civilian world and must adapt to a Marine Corps lifestyle. During training, drill instructors train recruits in a wide variety of subjects including weapons training, Marine Corps Martial Arts Program, personal hygiene and cleanliness, close order drill, and Marine Corps history. The training emphasizes physical fitness, and recruits must attain a minimum standard of fitness to graduate by passing a Physical Fitness Test. Recruits must also meet minimum combat-oriented swimming qualifications, qualify in rifle marksmanship with the M16A4 service rifle, and pass a 54-hour simulated combat exercise known as 'The Crucible'."
