= 3rd Recruit Training Battalion =

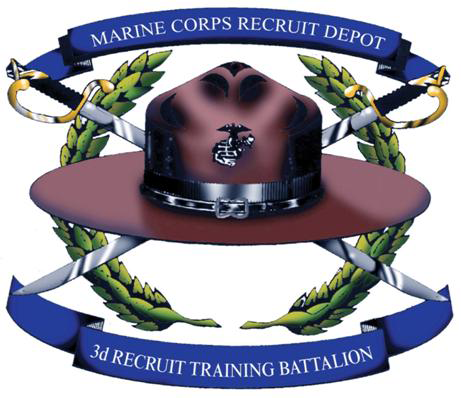
- 3rd BN insignia
- Active: 1921–present
- Country: United States
- Allegiance: United States of America
- Branch: United States Marine Corps
- Type: Recruit Training
- Role: Marine Recruit Training
- Part of: Recruit Training Regiment; 3rd Recruit Training Battalion
- Garrison/HQ: Marine Corps Recruit Depot San Diego
- Motto: Thundering Third
- Colors: Blue

Commanders
- Current commander: Lieutenant Colonel M. Matthew Phelps (Commander)
- Ceremonial chief: Sergeant Major Vitali I. Kholodov (Senior Enlisted Leader)

The 3rd Recruit Training Battalion is composed of four training companies; India, Kilo, Lima and Mike. The recruit training battalion is responsible ensuring that each company is following the procedures set forth by the Recruit Training Regiment. Each company is responsible to follow the standards established by the Commandant of the Marine Corps to train, teach, mentor, and above all lead recruits through a demanding standard-based training system.

== Mission ==
Third Recruit Training Battalion conducts recruit training, ensuring recruits complete required events and meet the objectives of recruit training, in order to transform recruits into basically trained Marines prepared to meet the challenges of their follow-on training.

== History ==
In 1921, the MCRDSD was formally commissioned and in 1923, it became the primary recruiting center for the west coast. During World War II, the flow of recruits into the base surged, with 18,000 recruits arriving in one month. In 1948, the base was formally named Marine Corps Recruit Depot San Diego and was home to the Recruit Training Regiment.

The 3d Battalion’s main mission is to train new United States Marine Corps recruits, specifically from west of the Mississippi River, but also from some areas east of the river, such as Wisconsin, Michigan, the Chicago metropolitan area and New Orleans. Recruit training includes a thirteen week process during which the recruit becomes cut off from the civilian world and must adapt to a Marine Corps lifestyle. During training, drill instructors train recruits in a wide variety of subjects including weapons training, Marine Corps Martial Arts Program, personal hygiene and cleanliness, close order drill, and Marine Corps history. The training emphasizes physical fitness, and recruits must attain a minimum standard of fitness to graduate by passing a Physical Fitness Test. Recruits must also meet minimum combat-oriented swimming qualifications, qualify in rifle marksmanship with the M16A4 service rifle, and pass a 54-hour simulated combat exercise known as "The Crucible".

Unlike training at Parris Island, recruits must leave the depot to conduct field training. Three weeks of the recruit’s training is spent at Edson Range aboard Marine Corps Base Camp Pendleton, where recruits fire on the rifle range, conduct field training, and undergo the Crucible. At the conclusion, recruits return to MCRD San Diego for graduation.
