= 2nd Recruit Training Battalion =

2nd Recruit Training Battalion 246
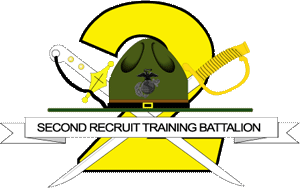
- 2nd BN insignia
- Active: 1921-present
- Country: United States
- Allegiance: United States of America
- Branch: United States Marine Corps
- Role: Recruit Training
- Part of: Recruit Training; 2nd Recruit Training Battalion
- Garrison/HQ: Marine Corps Recruit Depot San Diego
- Nickname: Second to None

The Second Recruit Training Battalion is part of the Marine Recruit Training Regiment. It is composed of Four Training Companies: Echo Company, Fox Company, Golf Company, and Hotel Company. The recruit training battalion is responsible ensuring that each company is following the procedures set forth by the Recruit Training Regiment.

== Mission ==
Provide Reception, processing, and recruit training for male enlisted personnel following initial entry into the Marine Corps. Provide training for Drill Instructors and officers entrusted with recruit training responsibilities.

== History ==
=== 2nd Recruit Training ===
In 1921, the MCRDSD was formally commissioned and in 1923, it became the primary recruiting center for the west coast. During World War II, the flow of recruits into the base surged, with 18,000 recruits arriving in one month. In 1948, the base was formally named Marine Corps Recruit Depot San Diego and was home to the Recruit Training Regiment.
