= Marine Recruit Training Regiment San Diego =

Marine Recruit Training Regiment West Coast
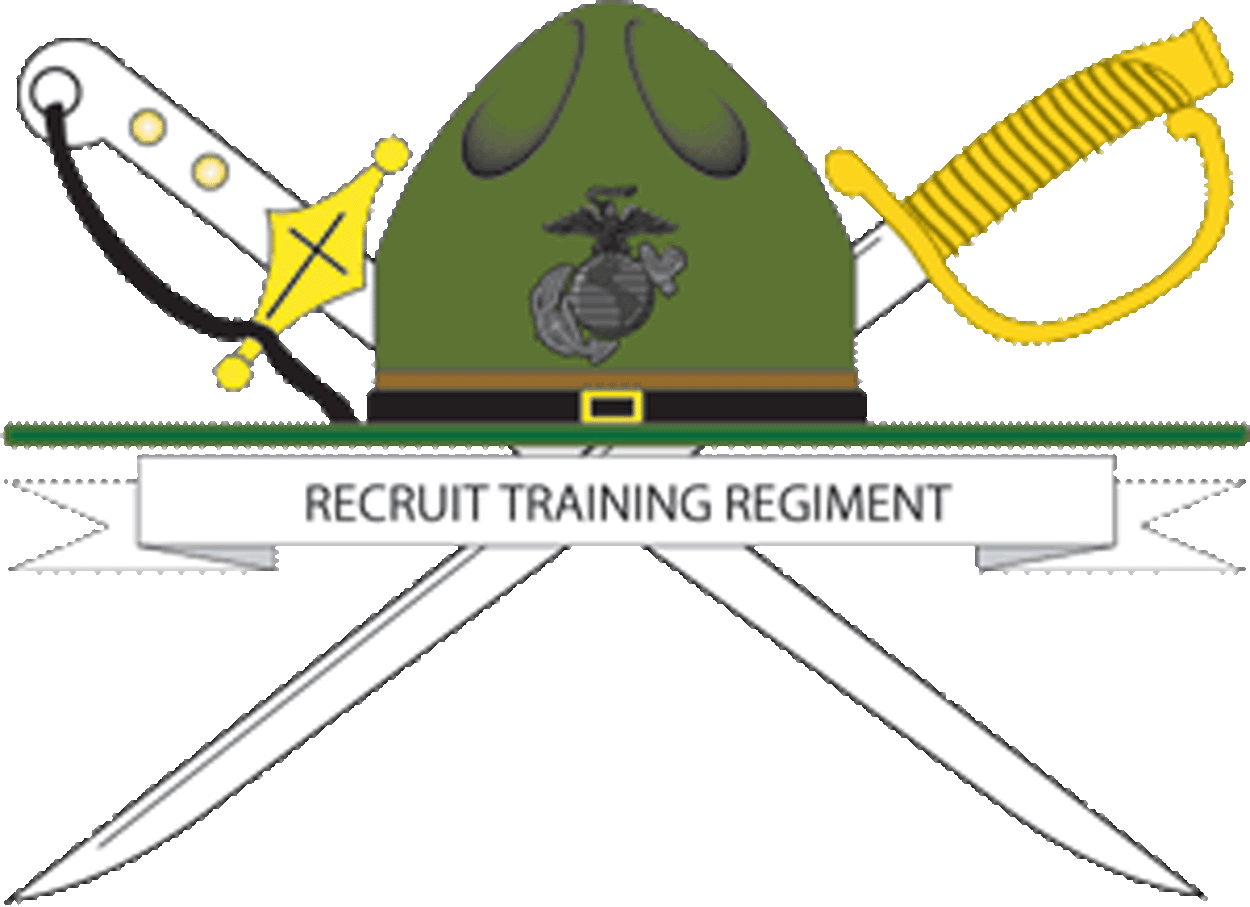
- Recruit Training Regiment insignia
- Active: 1921-present
- Country: United States
- Allegiance: United States of America
- Branch: United States Marine Corps
- Type: Recruit Training Regiment
- Role: Train Marine Recruits
- Garrison/HQ: Marine Corps Recruit Depot San Diego
- Mascots: PFC Johnny R. Manuelito “Manny”, un bulldog

Commanders
- Colonel of the Regiment: Colonel Jim G. Gruny
- Notable commanders: William G. Joslyn

The Marine Recruit Training Regiment San Diego (MCRDSD), based at San Diego, California, is a training regiment of the United States Marine Corps. It is composed of three recruitment battalions and three recruit training battalions: 1st, 2nd, 3rd. Each battalion is responsible for ensuring that each company within it is following the procedures set forth by the Recruit Training Regiment. The West Coast depot is in charge the basic training of all male candidates who join the Marine Corps from the west of the Mississippi

== History ==
In 1921, the MCRDSD was formally commissioned and in 1923, after moving from Mare Navy Shipyards to Vallejo, California to San Diego, it became the primary recruiting center for the west coast. During World War II, the flow of recruits into the base surged, with 18,000 recruits arriving in one month. In 1948, the base was formally named Marine Corps Recruit Depot San Diego and was home to the Recruit Training Regiment.

In the 1970s, the focus was on the recruiting effort and the depot became the headquarters of the Western recruiting region.

== Organization ==
The unit, in charge of recruitment and training, is divided into several entities:

- Headquarters Battalion
- San Diego Marine Band
- Field and Service Training Battalion
- 8th Recruiting district (Fort Worth, Texas)
- 9th Recruiting district (Naval Station Great Lakes, Illinois)
- 12th Recruiting district (San Diego)
- Training Regiment with 1 support battalion and 3 training battalions

== Training program ==
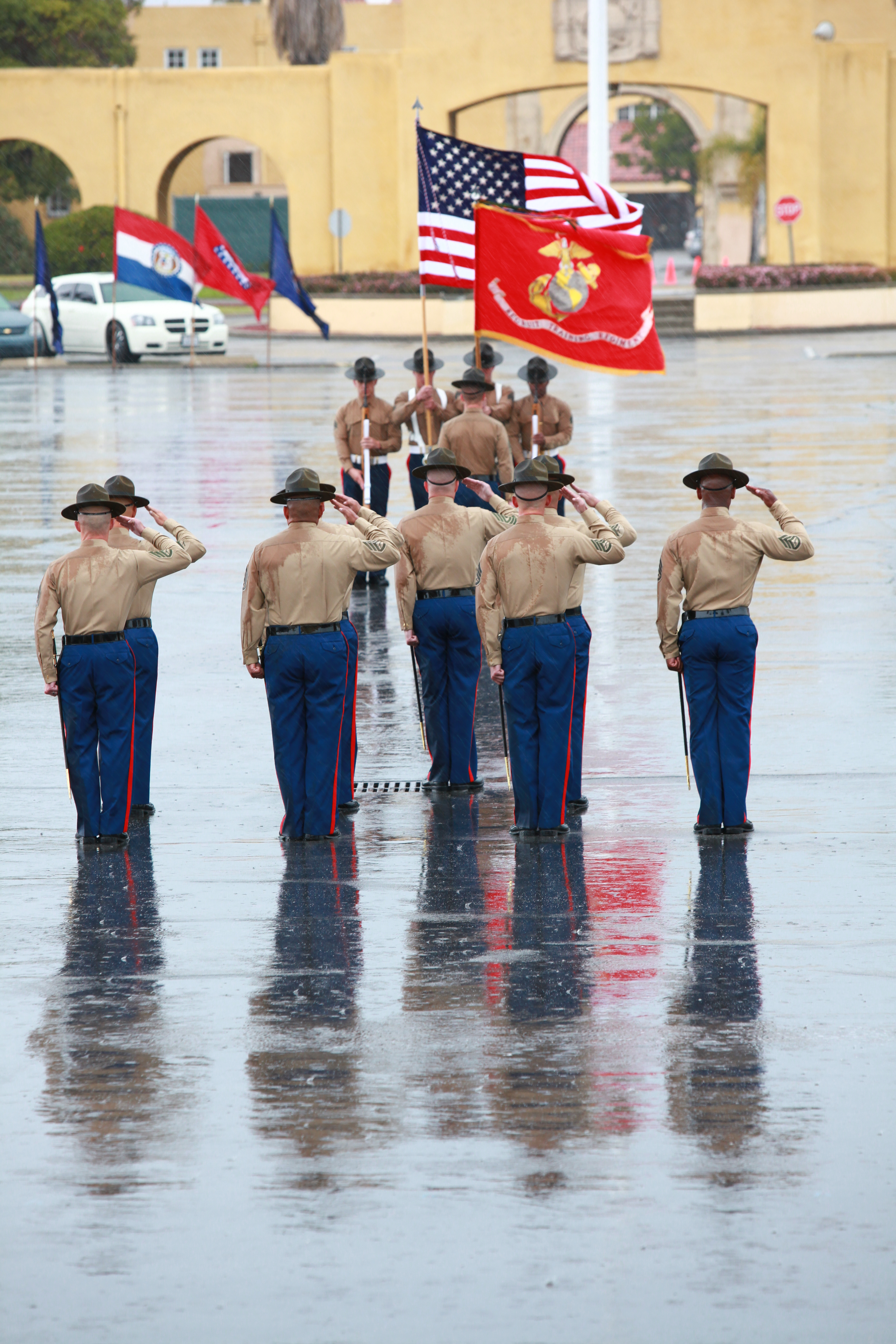
USMC drill instructors salute the national ensign during a graduation ceremony at MCRDPSD, 2013

Recruit training includes a thirteen-week process during which the recruit becomes cut off from the civilian world and must adapt to a Marine Corps lifestyle. During training, drill instructors train recruits in a wide variety of subjects including weapons training, Marine Corps Martial Arts Program, personal hygiene and cleanliness, close order drill, and Marine Corps history. The training emphasizes physical fitness, and recruits must attain a minimum standard of fitness to graduate by passing a Physical Fitness Test. Recruits must also meet minimum combat-oriented swimming qualifications, qualify in rifle marksmanship with the M16A4 service rifle, and pass a 54-hour simulated combat exercise known as "The Crucible". Unlike training at Parris Island, recruits must leave the depot to conduct field training. Three weeks of the recruit’s training is spent at Edson Range aboard Marine Corps Base Camp Pendleton, where recruits fire on the rifle range, conduct field training, and undergo the Crucible. At the conclusion, recruits return to MCRD San Diego for graduation.
