= Badges of the United States Marine Corps =

Military badges of the U.S. Marine Corps

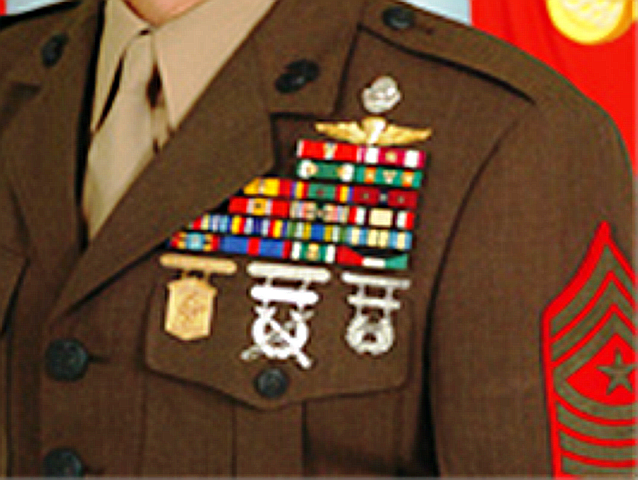
Example of USMC Badges, from top to bottom: Scuba Diver Insignia, Navy and Marine Corps Parachutist Insignia, Marine Corps Annual Rifle Squad Combat Practice Competition Badge (Gold), Marine Corps Rifle Expert Badge (with multiple award clasp), and Marine Corps Pistol Expert Badge (with multiple award clasp).

Insignia and badges of the United States Marine Corps are military badges issued by the United States Department of the Navy to Marines who achieve certain qualifications and accomplishments while serving on active or reserve duty in the United States Marine Corps.

As described in Chapters 4 and 5 of Marine Corps Uniform Regulations, "badges" are categorized as breast insignia (worn immediately above ribbons/medals), identification badges (usually worn at breast pocket level), and marksmanship badges (worn immediately below ribbons).

For the purpose of this article, the term "badge" shall be used exclusively to describe identification badges and marksmanship badges, and the term "insignia" shall be used for other worn accoutrements, according to the language in Marine Corps Uniform Regulations.

The modern-day United States Marine Corps currently maintains the following breast insignia and identification badges:

== Breast Insignia ==
As per Marine Corps Assignment, Classification and Travel Systems Manual (ACTS MANUAL) MCO P1000.6, Marines wear the appropriate breast insignia for qualification or designation in aviation, parachutist, explosive ordnance disposal, and diving.

Authorized breast insignia are worn on the left breast of all service and dress coats. They may optionally be worn on khaki shirts when the shirt is the outermost garment, utility coats or maternity work uniform coats. Miniature versions exist for evening dress jackets.

When worn alone, it is worn in the same position a single ribbon would be worn. When worn with ribbons, medals, or marksmanship badges, it is positioned 1/8 in (0.32 cm) above such awards. On combat utility uniform coats with slanted pockets, it is worn above a horizontal line tangent to the highest point of the pocket or "U.S. MARINES" service tape.

No more than two USMC-approved breast insignia shall be worn at any one time. When two insignia are worn they are ordered from top to bottom in the following order with 1/8 in (0.32 cm) separation in between: diver, EOD, parachutist, aviation. A Marine with more than one insignia within the parachutist, EOD and diver groups may only wear the senior insignia of the group. Marines may wear two insignia from the aviation group. If the Marine Special Operator Insignia is worn, no other insignia shall be worn.

=== Aviation Insignia ===
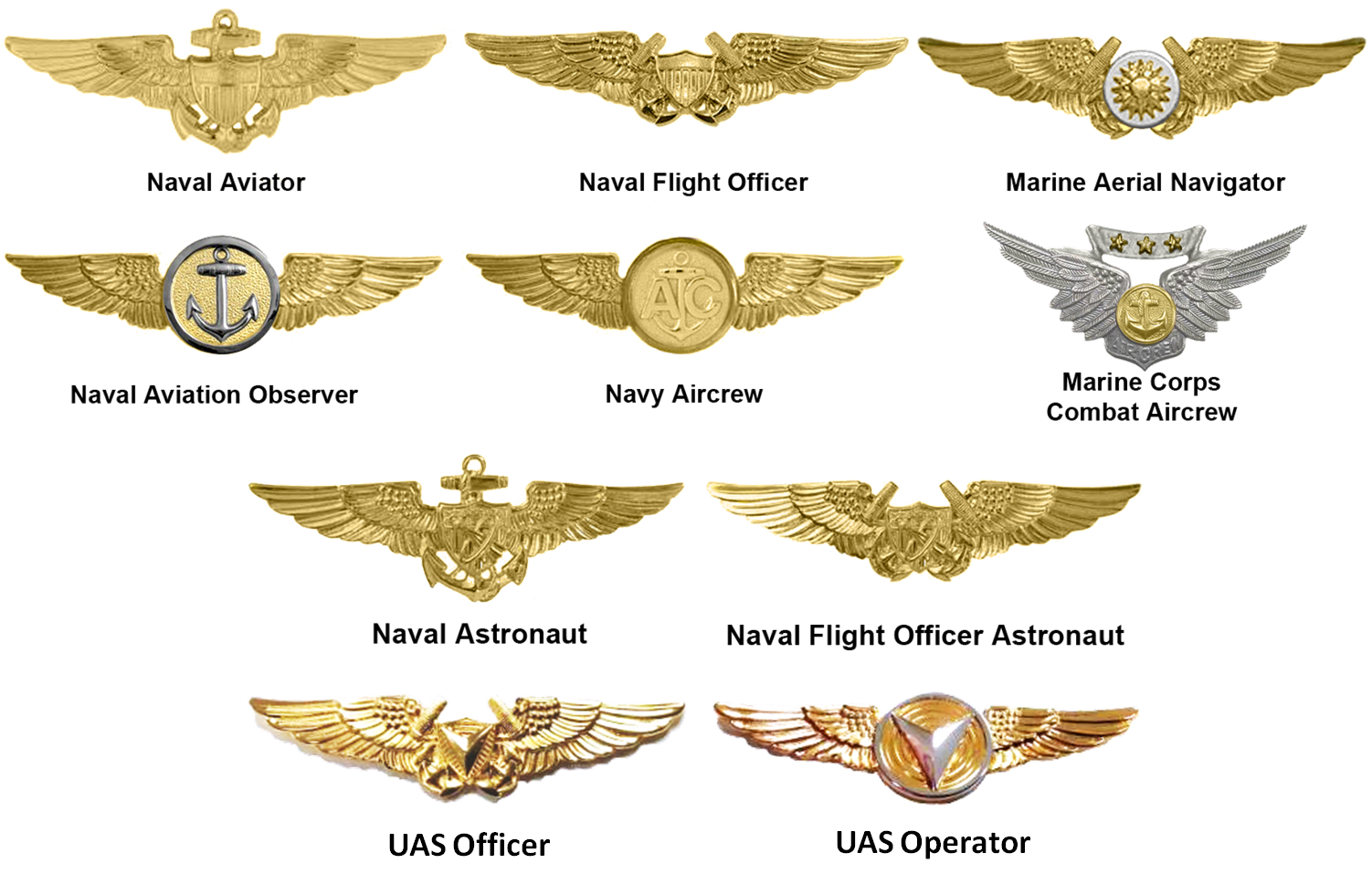
U.S. Marine Corps Aviation Insignia

Aviation Insignia are breast insignia that are issued to Marines who are qualified or designated to perform duties related to operation and support of Marine aircraft.

Officer insignia include the Naval Aviator insignia and Unmanned Aerial System (UAS) Officer insignia (Note: This is the same badge worn by U.S. Navy Air Vehicle Pilots (AVP)) for pilots and the Naval Flight Officer (NFO) insignia for non-piloting officers. There is also an astronaut version of the aviator and NFO Insignia, known as the Naval Astronaut and Naval Astronaut (NFO), respectively.

The Marine Aerial Navigator insignia is issued to enlisted personnel qualified to act as navigators aboard Marine aircraft; the Naval Aviation Observer insignia is issued to flight support personnel; and the Aircrew insignia and UAS Operator insignia are issued to enlisted personnel designated to operate equipment aboard aircraft.

=== Parachutist Insignia ===
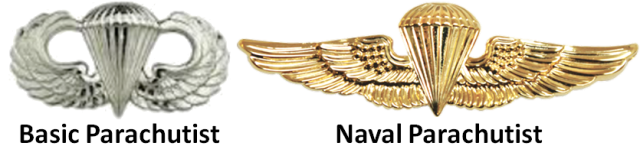
Military Parachutist Insignia

The Parachutist Insignia, also known as "lead sleds" or "lead wings", is awarded to personnel upon successful completion of the Basic Airborne Course at the Army Airborne School. The silver Basic Parachutist Insignia is issued for completion of basic parachutist training, five qualifying jumps. The gold Navy and Marine Corps Parachutist Insignia (first authorized for Marines in 1963 and Navy Parachute Riggers in 1941) are issued after five additional qualifying jumps. Graduation of US Navy Parachute Rigger school is no longer mandatory to earn the device.

=== Explosive Ordnance Disposal Insignia ===
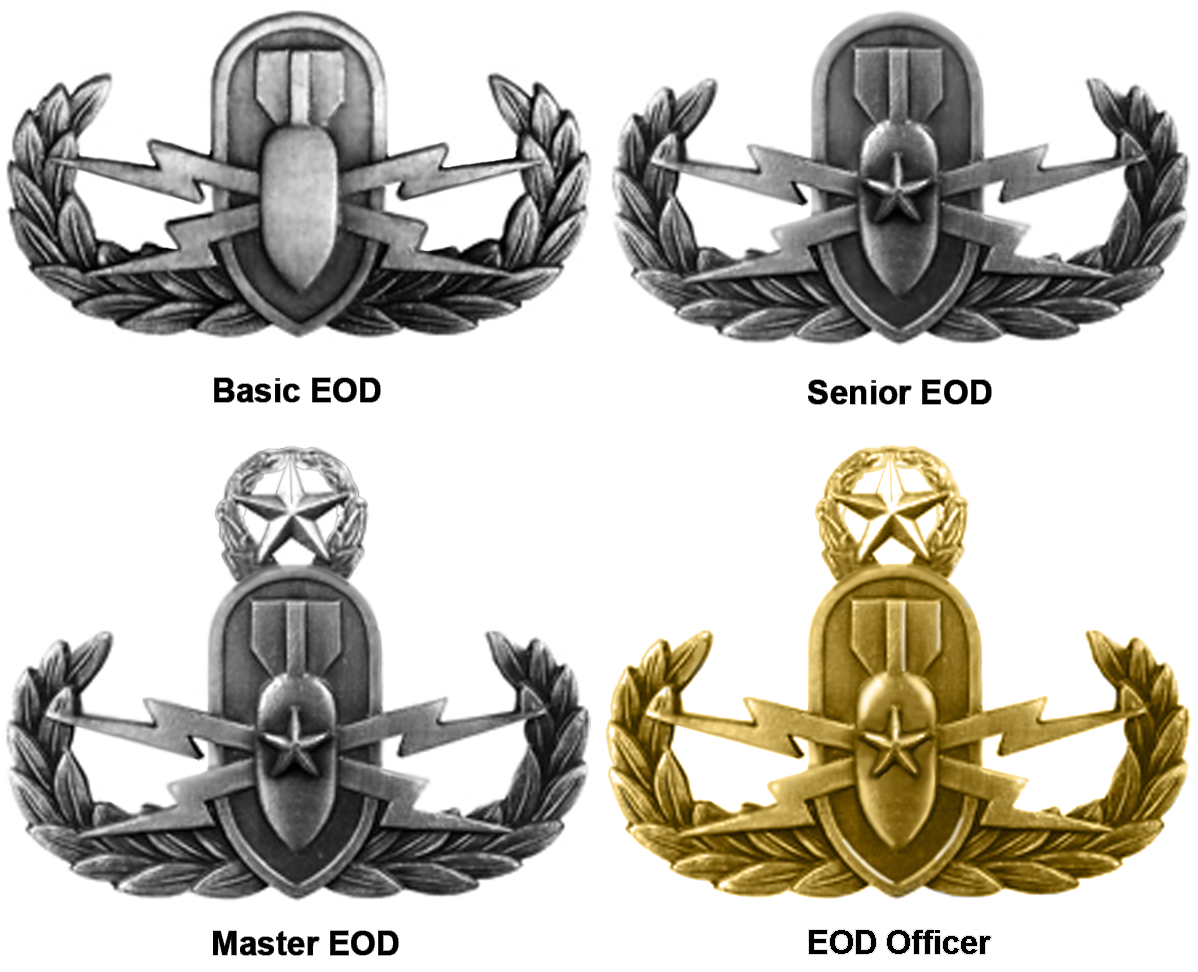
Explosive Ordnance Disposal Insignia

The Explosive Ordnance Disposal (EOD) Breast Insignia, also known as the "Crab", is awarded to personnel who have successfully completed training at the Naval School Explosive Ordnance Disposal (NAVSCOLEOD), Eglin Air Force Base, Florida. Personnel are trained to deal with the render-safe and disposal of conventional and unconventional munitions ranging from unserviceable small arms ammunition, improvised explosive devices (IEDs), to chemical/biological and nuclear munitions.

=== Diver Insignia ===
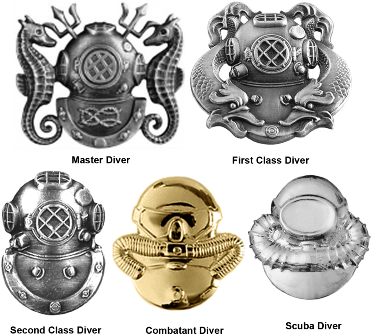
U.S. Marine Corps Diving Insignia

Diver insignia are issued to personnel who are qualified divers and is given in several degrees. The first degree of diver insignia is SCUBA Diver. The remaining insignia are awarded for deep sea dive qualifications and are issued in the degrees of Second Class, First Class, and Master Diver.

Combatant diver insignia is issued to graduates of the Combatant Diver Course, who are typically in the recon community. This badge features a Dräger LAR-V rebreather and low-profile diving mask.

=== Marine Special Operator Insignia ===
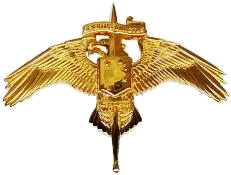
Marine Special Operator insignia

In August 2016, the Marine Corps approved a new Marine Special Operator Insignia for wear by graduates of the five-phase Individual Training Course (ITC).

The pin device will first be issued to the next ITC graduating class of critical skills operators. Critical skills operators and special operations officers already in the field will receive their pins later.

== Marksmanship Badges ==
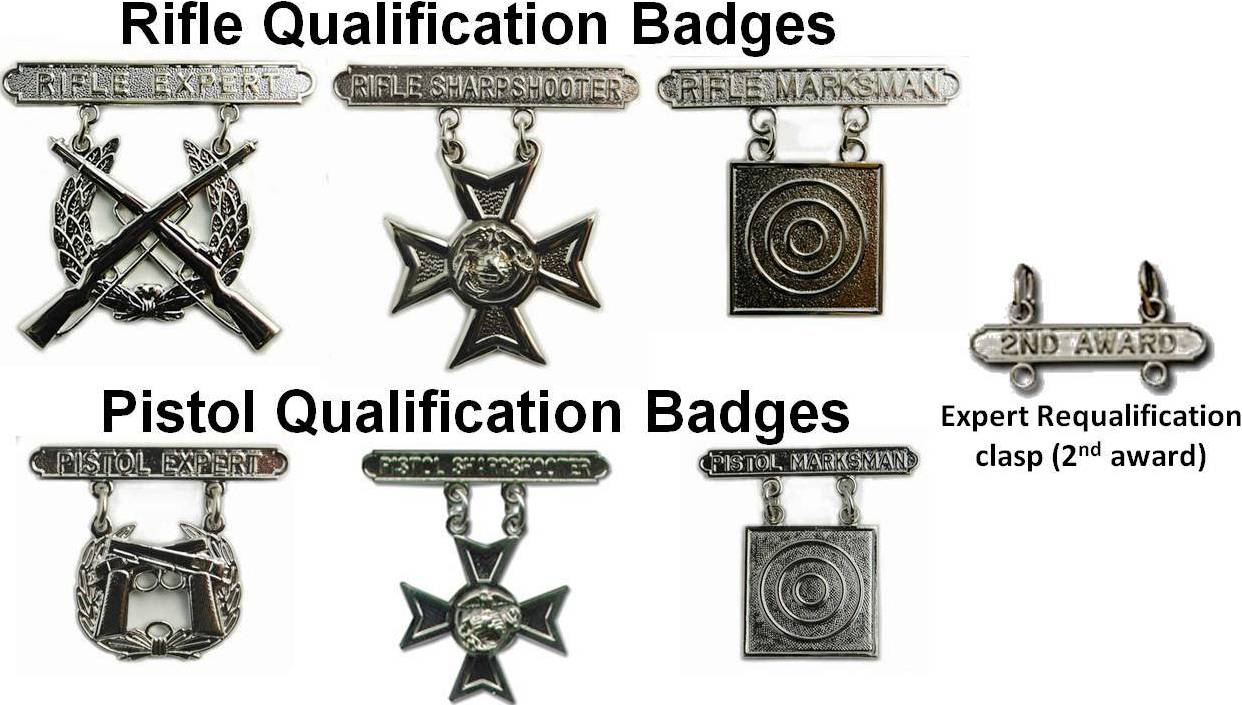
U.S. Marine Corps marksmanship qualification badges

Marine Corps marksmanship qualification badges are suspended beneath a bar reading the type of weapon and qualification received. The badge is also different in appearance, depending on which weapon qualification has been obtained. For a marksmanship qualification badge to be obtained, a service member must obtain a passing score and will receive a qualification level depending on the score obtained. Once a qualification has been obtained, and the marksmanship badge issued, the badge may be worn for the remainder of a military career, or until a different level of qualification (higher or lower) is achieved.

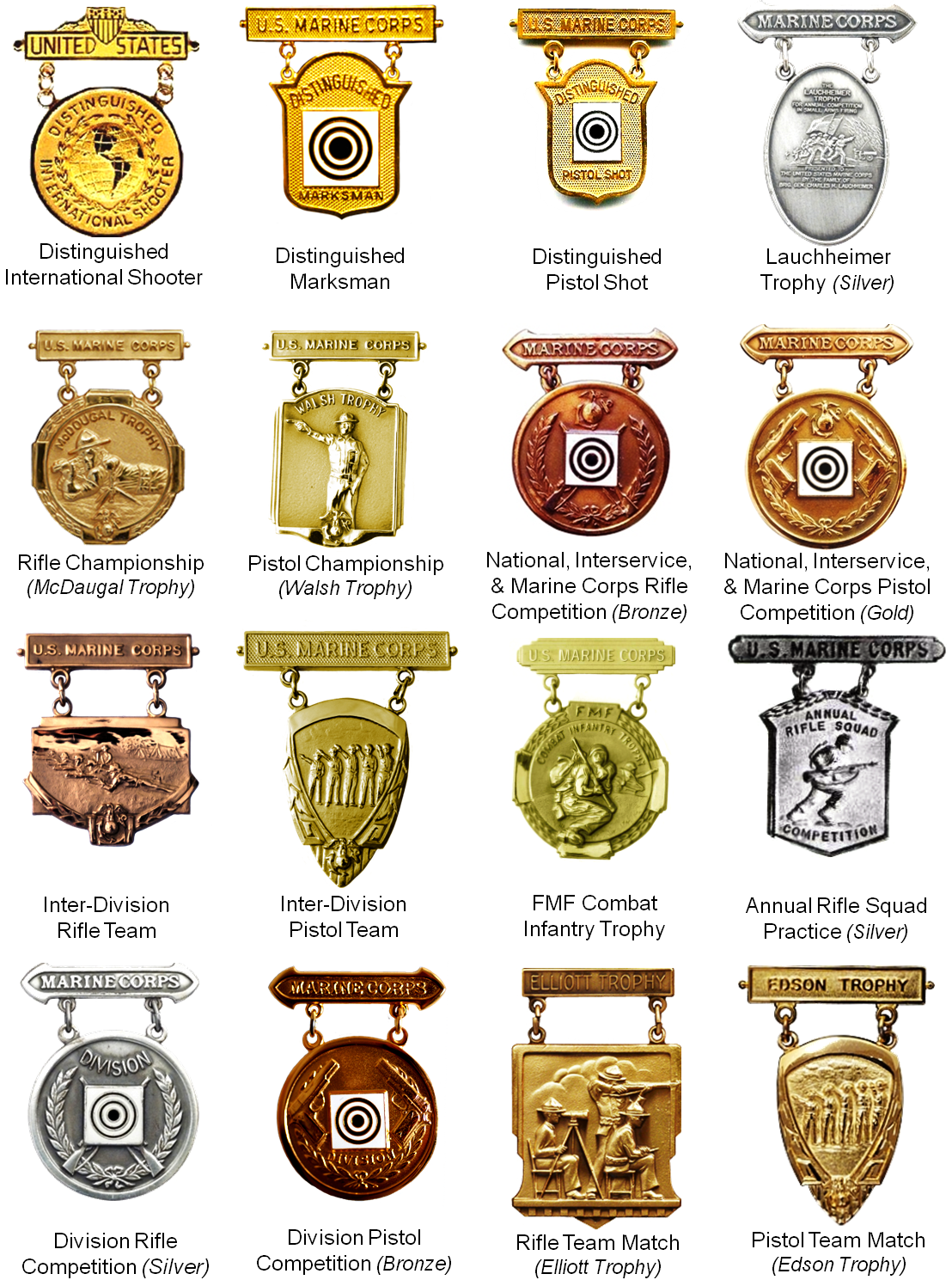
Examples of U.S. Marine Corps marksmanship competition badges (not inclusive)

In addition to the standard marksmanship badges, the Marine Corps has numerous marksmanship competition badges that are authorized for wear on the Marine Corps uniform as permanent awards. These badges are awarded alongside trophies that are present to the top-performing Marines at Marine Corps sponsored marksmanship competitions. The following marksmanship competition badges are authorized for wear on Marine Corps service uniforms and are listed in order of precedence:

- Distinguished International Shooter Badge
- Distinguished Marksman Badge
- Distinguished Pistol Shot Badge
- Lauchheimer Trophy Badge (Gold, Silver, and Bronze)
- Marine Corps Rifle Championship Badge (McDougal Trophy)
- Marine Corps Pistol Championship Badge (Walsh Trophy)
- Service level Excellence-In-Competition (EIC) Badges
  - National/Interservice/Marine Corps Rifle Competition Badge (Gold)
  - National/Interservice/Marine Corps Pistol Competition Badge (Gold)
  - National/Interservice/Marine Corps Rifle Competition Badge (Silver)
  - National/Interservice/Marine Corps Pistol Competition Badge (Silver)
  - National/Interservice/Marine Corps Rifle Competition Badge (Bronze)
  - National/Interservice/Marine Corps Pistol Competition Badge (Bronze)
- Inter-Division Rifle Competition Badge
- Inter-Division Pistol Competition Badge
- Fleet Marine Force (FMF) Combat Infantry Trophy Match Badge
- Annual Rifle Squad Combat Practice Competition Badge (Gold, Silver, and Bronze)
- Unit level EIC Badges
  - Division Rifle Competition Badge (Gold)
  - Division Pistol Competition Badge (Gold)
  - Division Rifle Competition Badge (Silver)
  - Division Pistol Competition Badge (Silver)
  - Division Rifle Competition Badge (Bronze)
  - Division Pistol Competition Badge (Bronze)
- Rifle Team Match Badges (San Diego, Wharton, Elliott, Wirgman, Lloyd, and Smith Trophies)
- Pistol Team Match Badges (Holcomb, Edson, Shively, and Pacific Trophies)

== Identification Badges ==
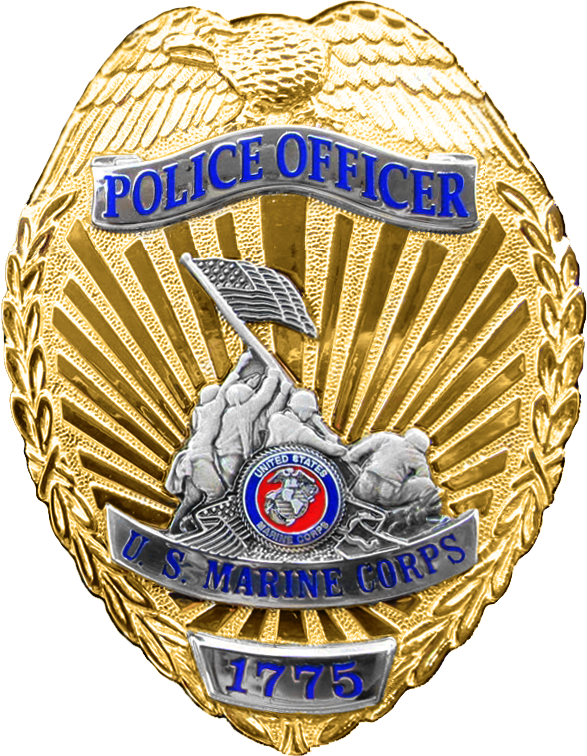
United States Marine Corps Military Police Badge

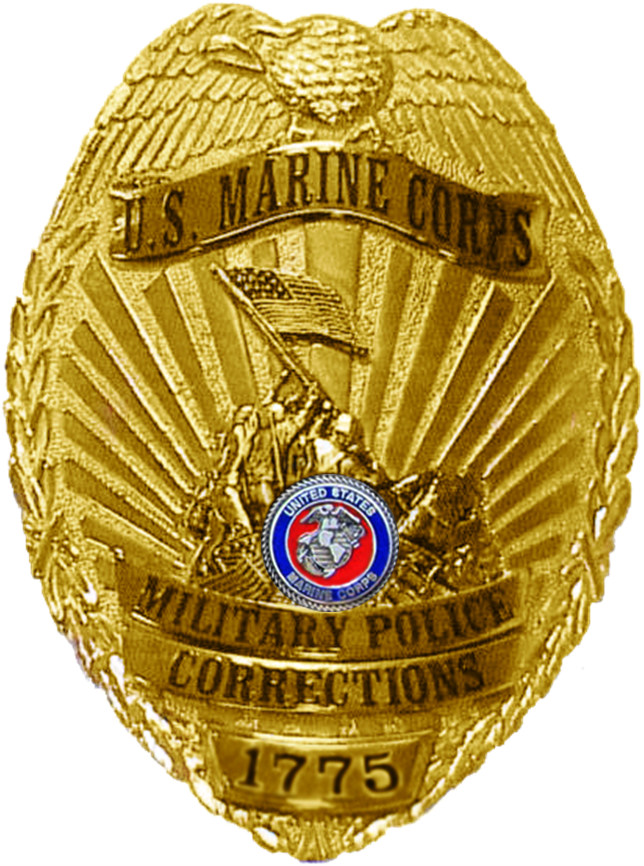
Marine Corps Military Police Corrections Badge

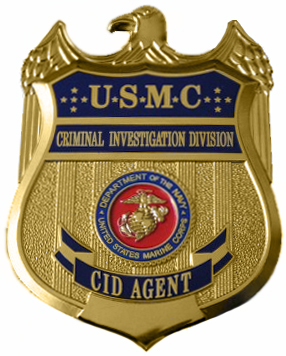
Marine Corps Criminal Investigation Division Agent Badge

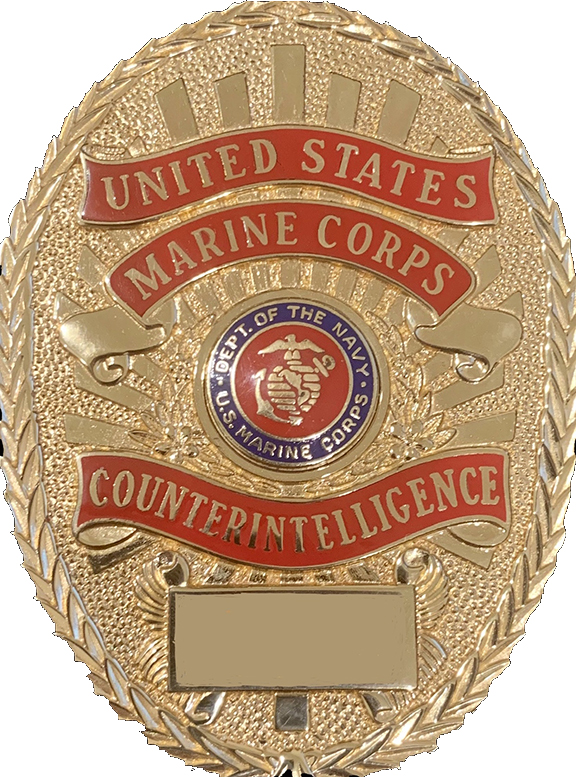
Marine Corps Counterintelligence Agent Badge

== Other accoutrements ==
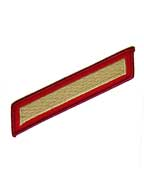
Service Stripes - earned every 4 years of service

== See also ==
- Military badges of the United States
- Identification badges of the United States military
- Obsolete badges of the United States military
- List of United States Marine Corps MOS
- Uniforms of the United States Marine Corps
