= United States observer badges =

American military badge

The various observer badges of the United States Armed Forces are military badges dating from World War I. The badges were issued by the United States Army (prior to the establishment of the United States Air Force in 1948) and United States Navy to navigators and otherwise non-pilot flying personnel whom generally acted as air observers or air gunners. Pilots were awarded one of the various U.S. aviator badges. During the Second World War, observer badges would be supplemented — primarily in the United States Army Air Forces (USAAF) — by individual badges for aeronautical specialists, such as the Bombardier Badge, Aerial Gunner Badge, and the Flight Engineer Badge, among others, with a similar situation occurring in the United States Navy.

Badges for each profession generally persisted into the 1950s, at which time the USAF and USN observer badges and specialist badges were generally phased-out in-favor of the modern aircrew badges and/or combined navigator/flight specialist-observer badges (such as the United States Navy "Naval Aviation Observer and Flight Meteorologist Insignia" which is issued to flight-qualified mission specialists in both the U.S. Navy and U.S. Marine Corps). The U.S. Air Force now only awards the USAF Observer Badge to Air Force personnel who have qualified as NASA Space Shuttle mission specialists, have flown an actual mission aboard the shuttle and/or the International Space Station and who are otherwise not previously aeronautically "rated." The USAF Observer Badge is technically the only remaining stand-alone observer badge within the U.S. Armed Forces proper, though it shares a design with the USAF Navigator Badge and USAF Combat Systems Officer Badge. The United States Army, since the separation of the USAAF from it in 1948, no longer awards any form of observer badge.

While rarely-issued among U.S. personnel, observer badges have seen a resurgence in the air forces of other countries, most notably the United Kingdom and Canada.

== First World War ==
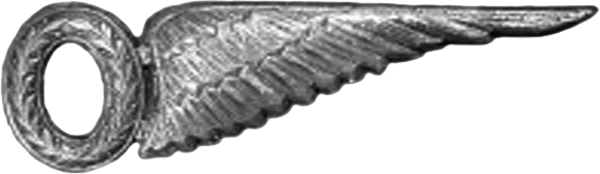
First World War Observer Badge

The original Observer Badge was a half-wing variation of the Aviator Badge worn by military pilots of the United States Army Air Service and later the United States Army Air Corps. The badge was mainly awarded to gunners, spotters, and navigators on the first armed military aircraft. With the advent of bombing, the Observer Badge was also initially authorized for aircraft bombardiers. A new badge was soon created for these duties, however: the Bombing Aviator Badge.

Those rated as Balloon Observers were also eligible for the badge, and the badge was typically referred to as both the Airplane Observer Badge and the Balloon Observer Badge. The design of the badge awarded was identical in both cases, and towards the end of the First World War was commonly referred to as the "Airplane and Balloon Observer Badge", although the ratings for which the badge was issued remained distinct.

== Second World War ==
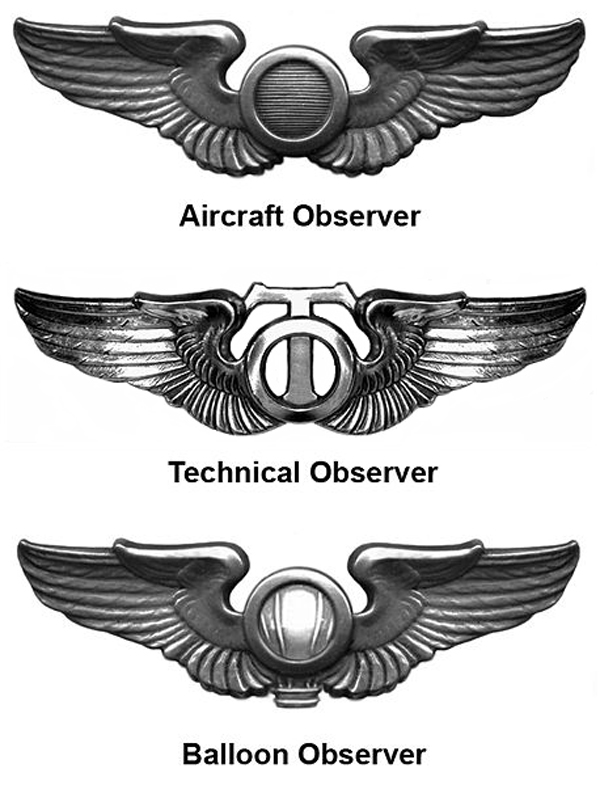

Between 1919 and 1935 the design of the Observer Badge remained unchanged, and was issued to both airplane and lighter-than-air ratings. However, as military aviation developed, changes in the concept of an Airplane Observer necessitated the redesign of the Observer Badge with a corresponding change in the eligibility criteria. On 20 February 1940 the rating was changed to that of Combat Observer, followed by redesignation as Aircraft Observer on 4 September 1942. Note that bombardiers that used the top secret SHORAN also received the Observer Badge. They sat midship, where the radio operator would normally sit, since they used an electronic not optical bombsight.

By the time of the United States' entry into the Second World War, three Observer Badges were authorized by the Army Air Forces. The first was the Combat Observer Badge: in appearance an Aviator Badge with a large 'O' in the center. For Balloon Observers, a separate badge was created: the Observer Badge augmented with a balloon insignia.

The third and final version of the Observer Badge was the Technical Observer Badge, an Aviator Badge with a T and O motif in the center. The Technical Observer Badge was primarily awarded to flight engineering personnel assigned to assist the flight engineer.

== United States Navy, Marine Corps, and Coast Guard ==
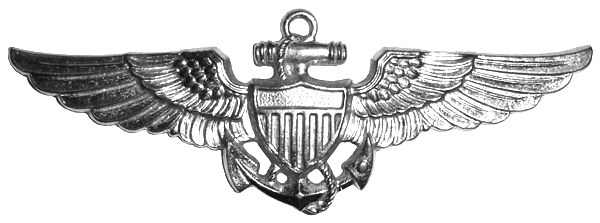
The original Naval Aviation Observer Insignia was identical to the Naval Aviator Insignia except it was made out of silver.

The Naval Aviation Observer Badge was first created in 1922, awarded to navigators and other support personnel on naval aircraft. The original badge was based on the design of the Naval Aviator badge, but with a single wing on the left, and with the anchor surmounted by an "O" rather than a shield. In 1927 this insignia was superseded by a new device, identical to the Naval Aviator's wings, but in silver rather than gold.

This in turn was replaced by a gold insignia with a center device of a silver anchor within a silver circle, used from 1929 to 1968.

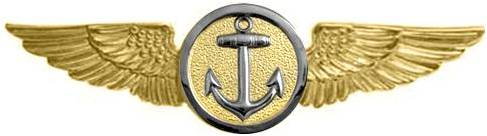
Naval Aviation Observer/Flight Meteorologist Badge

For a brief period starting in 1945, the Secretary of the Navy approved distinct insignia for Naval Aviation Observers with Navigation, Radar, Tactical, and Aerology specializations. These were abolished in favor of the standardized gold insignia/silver anchor/silver circle design.

In 1966 a new insignia was instituted, and by 1968 the Naval Aviation Observer Badge was replaced by the Naval Flight Officer Badge. However, in lieu of being totally discontinued, the criteria for the Naval Aviation Observer insignia was modified again and granted to non-pilot/non-NFO aviation mission specialists such as in-flight Meteorologists or for Naval Intelligence or Cryptology officers who regularly fly as crew on selected naval aircraft. In this form the Naval Observer Badge is still in existence, but is alternatingly referred to by both its original name and, in the case of when worn by Meteorology officers, as the Flight Meteorologist Badge. In the Marine Corps the badge is awarded to in-flight aircraft support personnel under its original name as the Naval Aviation Observer Badge for non-aeronautically designated officers flying in observer/spotter roles in Marine Corps aircraft.

The Coast Guard authorized the Aviation Mission Specialist designation on August 26, 2003 in COMDTNOTE 1200 (ALCOAST 401/03). Aerial Ice Observers (from the International Ice Patrol) as well as Sensor System Operators, Tactical Systems Operators, Aviation Gunners and Aviation Medical Technicians are eligible for designation. Coast Guard Aviation Mission Specialist personnel also wear the same uniform insignia as Naval Aviation Observers. Permanent designation is attained at 200 hours for rotary wing and 400 hours for fixed wing specialists.

== US Air Force Observer rating ==
U.S. Air Force Navigator/Combat Systems Officer/Observer Badge

With the creation of the United States Air Force in 1947, aviation observers were phased out and replaced by more highly trained specialists known as Aircrew personnel. The Aircrew Badge was created prior to the Second World War, but had only been awarded to enlisted personnel. Since the creation of the USAF Officer Aircrew Badge (an unrated award), the Navigator-Observer Badge has been issued to otherwise unrated officers who complete NASA Mission Specialist training with the aeronautical rating of Observer. On completion of an operational mission they may then apply to the Air Force Chief of Staff for the Astronaut qualification that permits them to wear the USAF Navigator / Combat Systems Officer version of the Astronaut Badge.

=== Civil Air Patrol ===
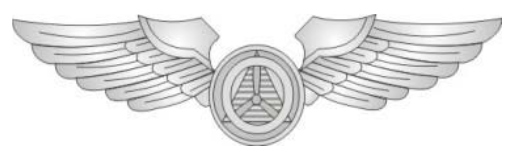
Air Force Auxiliary, Civil Air Patrol Observer Badge

The title "Observer" is still used regularly in the U.S. Air Force Auxiliary, better known as the Civil Air Patrol. Civil Air Patrol observers may act as the mission commander for aircrews engaged in search and rescue, homeland defense reconnaissance, or other Air Force-authorized missions, serving as the liaison between the sortie and mission base. Observers are trained in air navigation, radio communications, and other technical subjects such as aerial direction finding. The Civil Air Patrol badge for an observer looks almost identical to the CAP pilot badge, except that the observer device has an additional O or thin circle atop the central CAP emblem.

== See also ==
- United States aviator badges
- United States aircrew badges
- United States astronaut badges
- United States balloon pilot badges
- Badges of the United States Air Force
- Badges of the United States Army
- Badges of the United States Coast Guard
- Badges of the United States Marine Corps
- Badges of the United States Navy
- Military badges of the United States
- Obsolete badges of the United States military
