= Marine Aerial Navigator insignia =

US Marine Corps badge

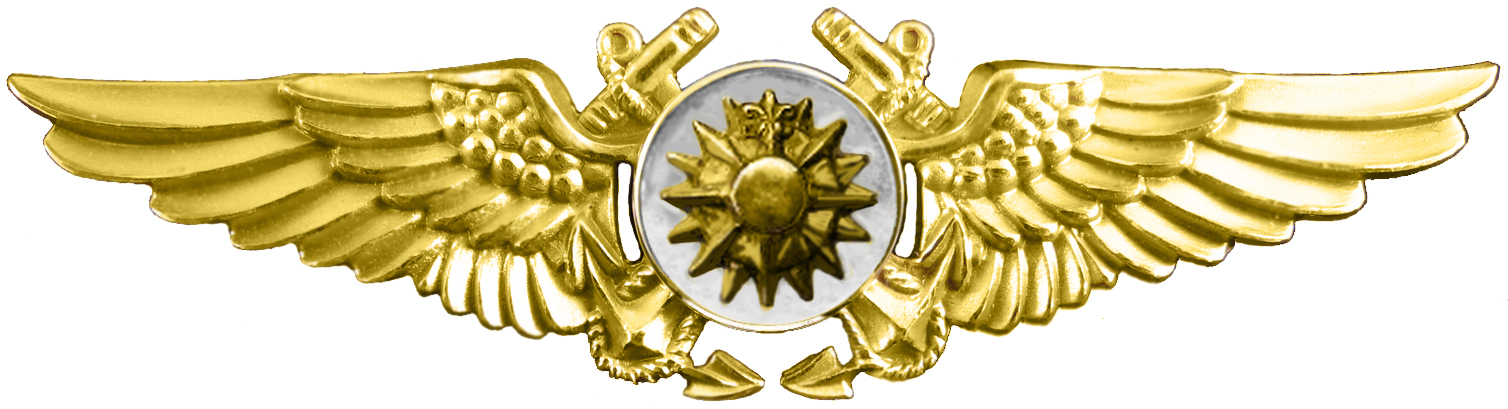

The Marine Aerial Navigator insignia is a military badge of the United States Marine Corps that is issued to Marine Corps enlisted personnel who complete flight training as a navigator on board Marine Corps aircraft. The Marine Aerial Navigator insignia is not issued to U.S. Navy aviation personnel and is the only independent aviation insignia issued to the Marine Corps.

The Marine Aerial Navigator insignia is similar in appearance to the Naval Flight Officer insignia and is considered a "successor" to the Naval Aviation Observer (Navigation) insignia, issued between March 1945 and March 1947.

To be awarded the Marine Aerial Navigator insignia, a service member must complete the Marine Aerial Navigator Course. The Marine Aerial Navigation School was stationed at Mather AFB, until that base was closed under the BRAC, upon which time it was moved to Randolph AFB. The Marine Aerial Navigation School remained at Randolph until the school was decommissioned with the graduation of Class 04-01 on 31 July, 2004. Presently, personnel must obtain an equivalent formal course of another service and volunteer to fly as enlisted aircrew. Marine Aerial Navigators were eliminated with the introduction of the KC-130J aircraft. While training of Marine Aerial Navigators has ceased, they continue to fly on the 'legacy' KC-130T aircraft until their eventual replacement with KC-130J airframes.

Upon completion of training, and certification as a Marine Corps Navigator, the Marine Aerial Navigator insignia is presented. After designation, Marine Aerial Navigators serve in the Military Occupational Specialty (MOS) 7371 (Aerial Navigator-Trainee) while undergoing aircraft model-specific training and move into MOS 7372 (First Navigator) upon completion of their aircraft type training. Navigators that enter the warrant officer ranks move into MOS 7380 (Mission Specialist/Navigation Officer). There is no separate insignia worn by warrant officer navigators.

== See also ==
- Badges of the United States Marine Corps
- Obsolete badges of the United States military
