= Army Air Force Technician Badge =

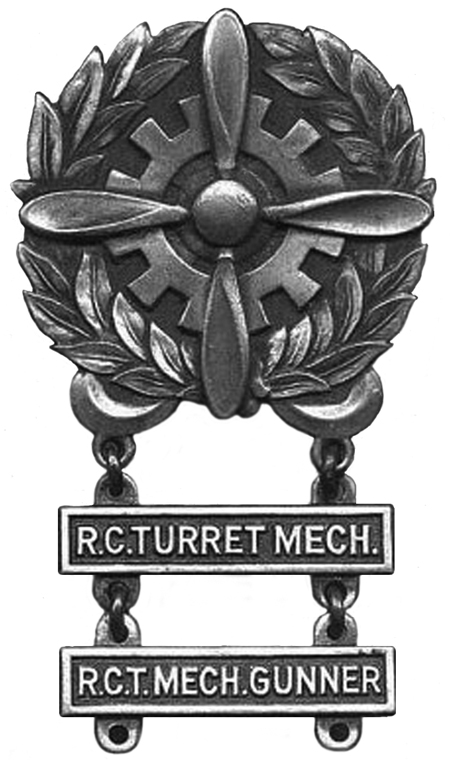

The Army Air Force Technician Badge was an award of the United States Army Air Forces, which was first created in 1941. Similar in design to the Weapons Qualification Badge, the Army Air Force Technician Badge was awarded to denote special training and qualifications held by members of the Army Air Force.

The Army Air Force Technician Badge appeared as a wreathed propeller from which qualification bars were suspended that denoted the training and qualifications held by the wearer. 27 bars were authorized to the Army Air Force Technician Badge, including:

With the creation of the United States Air Force in 1947, the Army Air Force Technician Badge was renamed as the Air Force Technician Badge and was authorized for wear into the 1960s. There were no Air Force Technician Badges issued after the Korean War, however, and by the 1970s the badge was considered obsolete.

== See also ==
- Military badges of the United States
- Obsolete badges of the United States military
