= United States recruiter awards =

U.S. military decoration

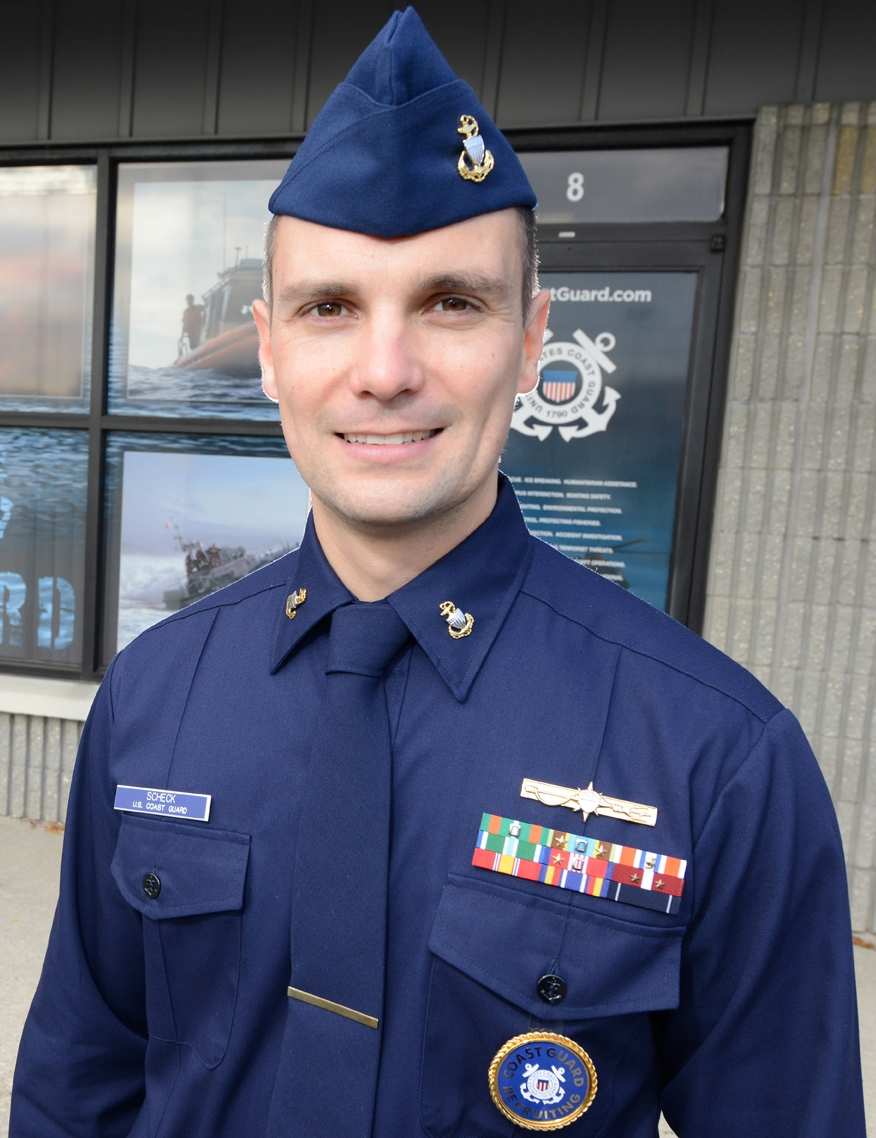
A Coast Guard recruiter wearing the Recruiting Badge with Wreath on the Winter Dress Blue uniform

The United States uniformed services issue a variety of decorations to personnel who have performed recruitment duties as service recruiters. Recruiter badges are issued by every branch of the U.S. uniformed services except for the United States Marine Corps and the National Oceanic and Atmospheric Administration Commissioned Corps. All services issue a ribbon to personnel who have served as recruiters, except the United States Army. As of 2023, the U.S. Army issues the "Army Recruiting Ribbon" to all soldiers that make referrals that result in an enlistment, not explicitly to soldiers that serve as recruiters.

== U.S. Army ==
=== Badges ===
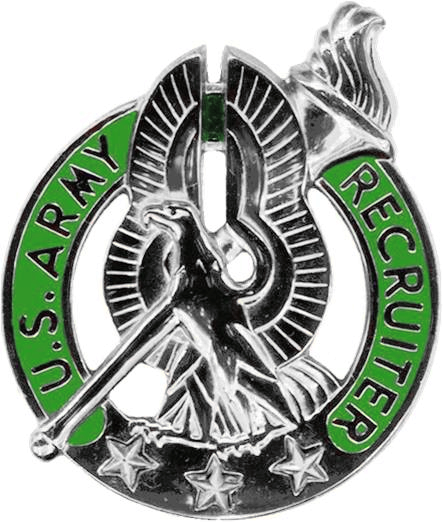
Army Basic Recruiter Identification Badge

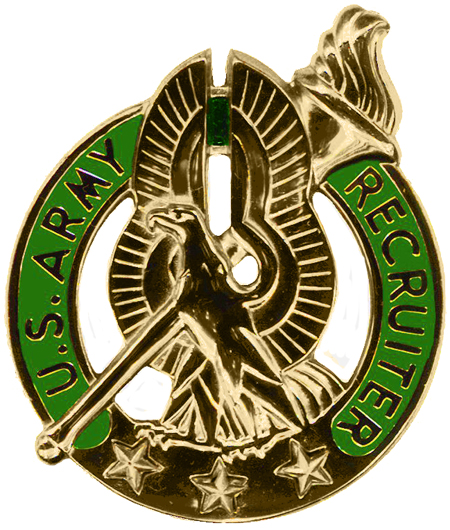
Gold Recruiter Badge

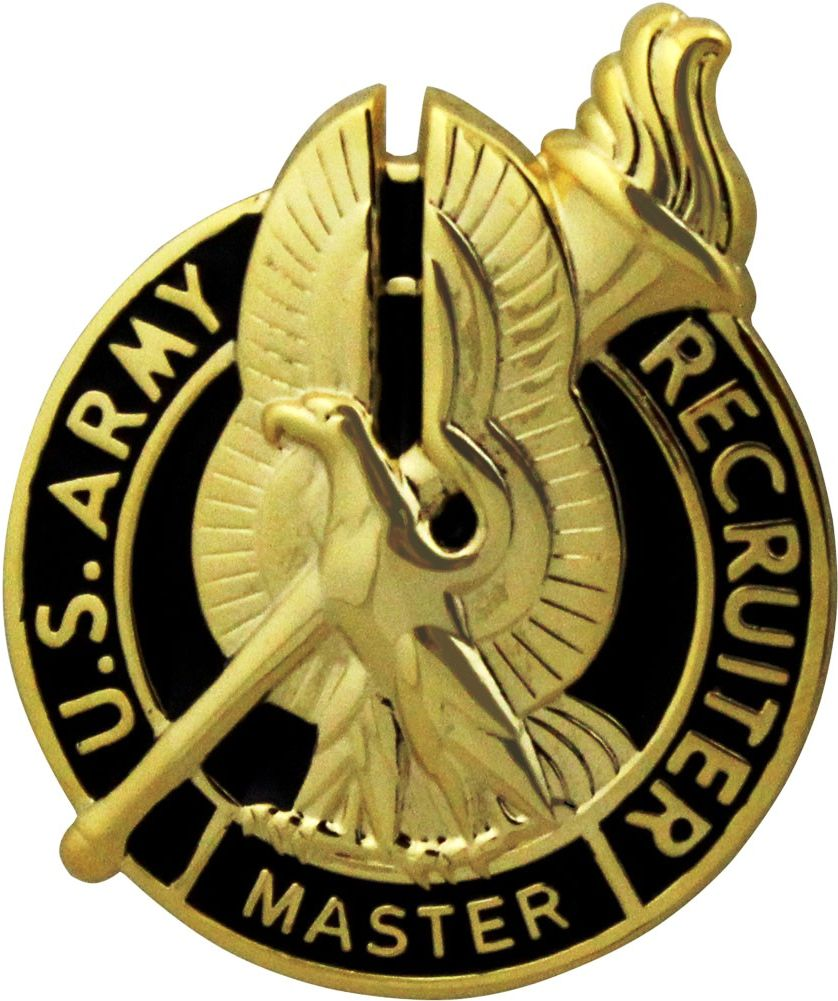
Army Master Recruiter Badge

U.S. Army recruiter badges are presented to active and reserve Army personnel who are assigned to the U.S. Army Recruiting Command (USAREC). The Basic Recruiter Identification Badge is a silver crest that incorporates an eagle with raised wings straddling a flaming torch surrounded by a green banner with the words "U.S. Army Recruiter." Army Recruiters can compete for the Gold Recruiter Badge which is a gold variant of the Basic Recruiter Identification Badge and work towards qualifying for the Master Recruiter Badge.

All Army personnel that graduate from the Army Recruiter Course (ARC) or are assigned to USAREC are authorized to wear the Basic Recruiter Identification Badge. However, only those ARC graduates who have satisfied specific recruiting goals are authorized to wear the Basic Recruiter Identification Badge as a permanent award. The Gold Recruiter Badge is awarded when a recruiter has achieved 2,400 production points while assigned as a recruiter. The Master Recruiter Badge is earned in the same manner as the Army's Expert Infantryman Badge, Expert Field Medical Badge, and Expert Soldier Badge whereby the recruiter must pass a series of tests and recruiting requirements in additional to holding the rank of a non-commissioned officer, warrant officer, or officer.

Former Army Recruiter Badges

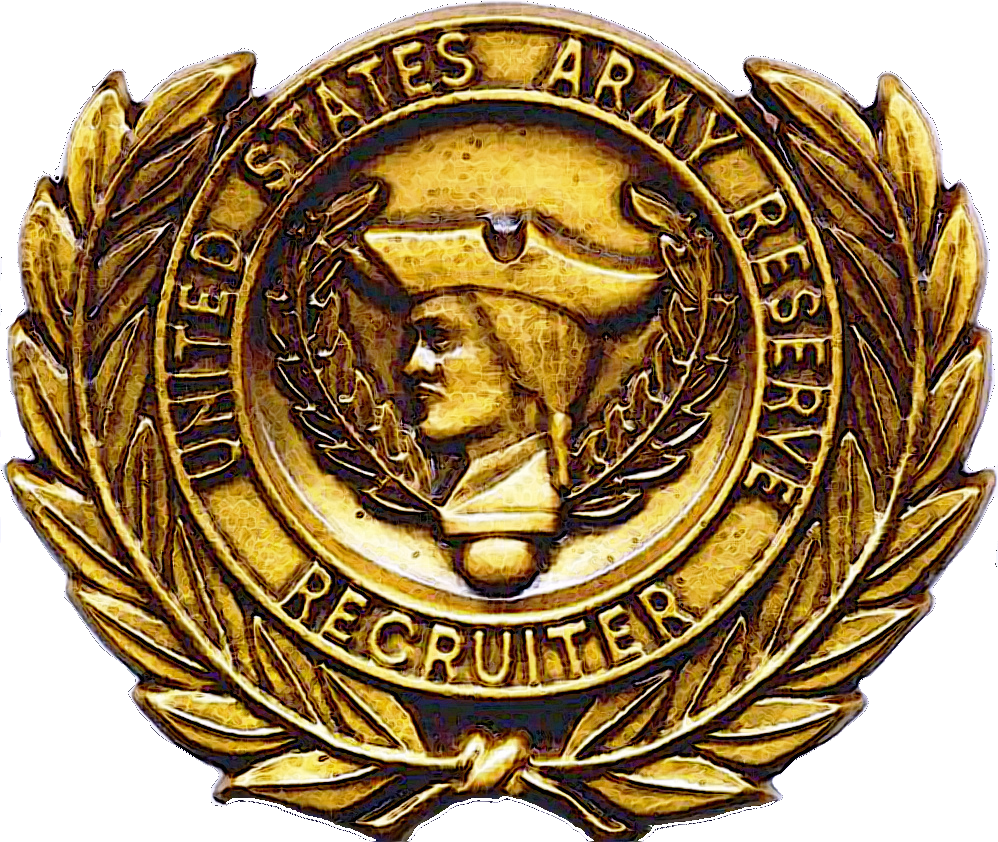
Reserve Recruiter Identification Badge

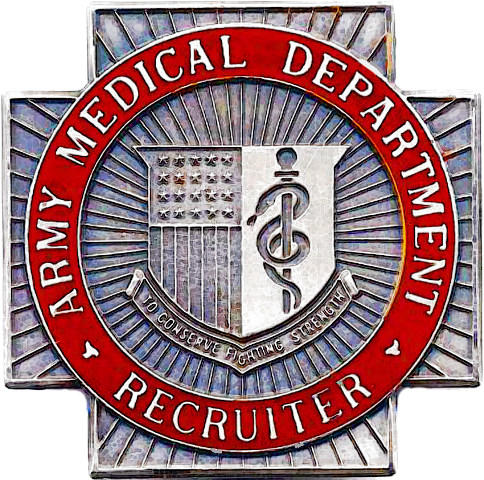
Medical Department Recruiter Identification Badge

Prior to the establishment of the Master Recruiter Badge in September 2011, Army Recruiters could earn up to three gold achievement stars for their Basic Recruiter Identification Badge, the Gold Recruiter Badge with up to three sapphire achievement stars, the Army Recruiter Ring, and the Glenn E. Morrell Medallion, respectively, as symbols of successive achievements in recruiting.

Starting in World War II, the Reserve Recruiter Identification Badge was also an identification badge of the U.S. Army until June 2001 when the U.S. Army declared the award discontinued in favor of the standard Recruiter Badge used by both active duty and reserve recruiters. During the years of its issuance, the Reserve Recruiter Badge was authorized for wear while serving a tour of duty as a military recruiter for the U.S. Army Reserve. The badge was not considered a permanent award, and was surrendered at the completion of duties as a reserve recruiter.

Due to the stigma that existed with the U.S. Army shortly after the Vietnam War, the Army's Surgeon General requested a unique recruiter badge be authorized for wear by Army medical recruiters to help distinguished them from regular Army recruiters at recruiting events. In November 1991, the Army Deputy Chief of Staff for Personnel approved the creation of the Army Medical Department Recruiter Identification Badge which was in use until June 2001 when it was replaced by the Army Recruiter Identification Badges. This badge was authorized for wear in the same manner as the Army Reserve Recruiter Identification Badge. However, this badge replaced the Distinctive Unit Insignia on the black pull-over sweater when worn by Army medical recruiters.

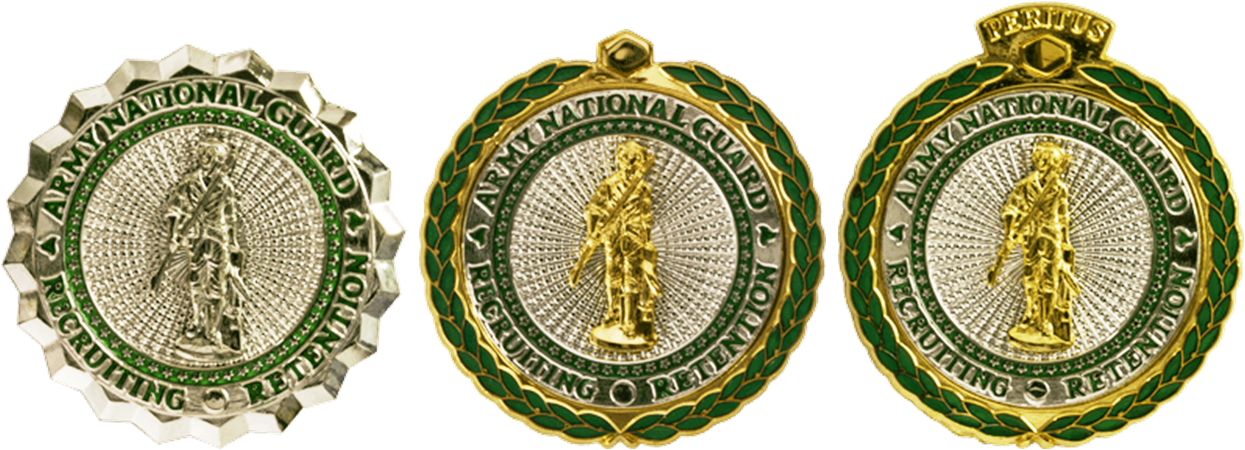
ARNG Recruiting and Retention Badges (left to right: Basic, Senior, and Expert)

Recruiters of the Army National Guard (ARNG) wear distinct Army National Guard Recruiting and Retention Badges which depicts the Minuteman in the center of the badge. The Army National Guard Recruiting and Retention Badges are awarded in three degrees (basic, senior, and expert). The basic badge is unique in its design while the senior and expert badges are similar in appearance with the expert badge displaying the words "Peritus" in a gold arch at the top of the badge. The senior and expert badges can be modified to reflect specific recruiting awards, specifically the "Master 7" and "Director's 54" awards. On the senior and expert badges, raised gold numerals "7" or "54" are placed inside the raised hexagon at the top of the badge.

In addition to the modifications that are made to a recruiter's senior or expert badge, those Army National Guard Recruiters that earn the Director's 54 award are also presented a special ring for their recruiting achievement.

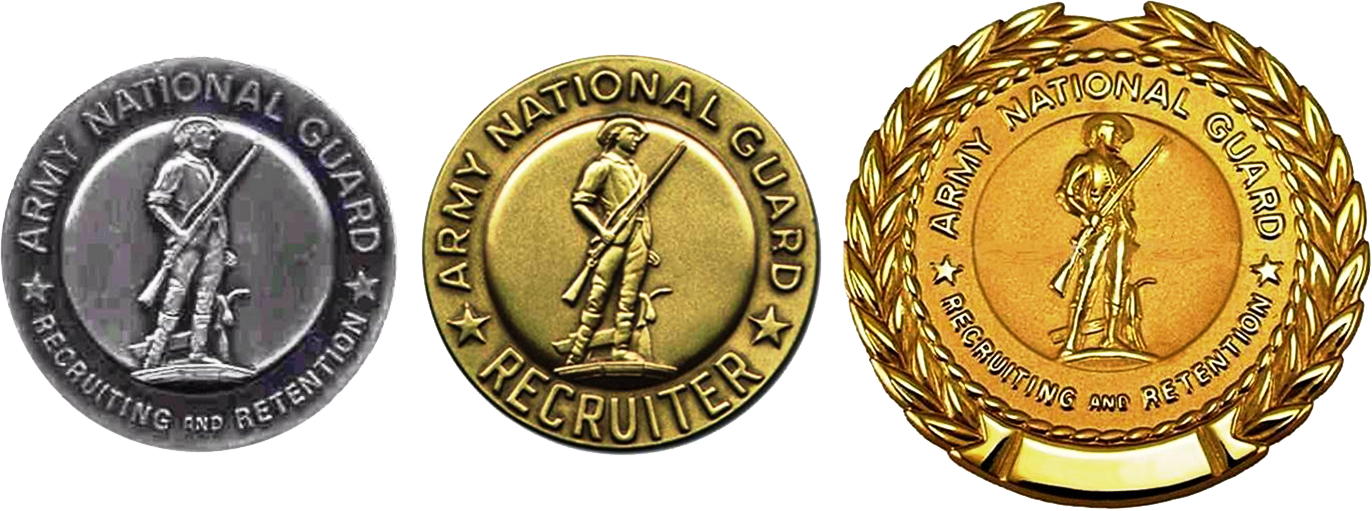
Former ARNG Recruiting and Retention Badges (left to right: Basic, Senior, and Master)

On 12 May 2008, the design of the Army National Guard Recruiting and Retention Badges changed to what you see above. Prior to this change, these badges were simpler in design with a silver (basic), gold (senior), and gold with wreath (master) versions. As with the new design, these badges incorporated the Minutemen prominently in the center surrounded by the words "ARMY NATIONAL GUARD RECRUITING AND RETENTION." Previous versions of these badges used to have to words "ARMY NATIONAL GUARD RECRUITER" but remained basically unchanged since their introduction in the mid-1970s. The master version had a gold scrawl at the bottom of the wreath where the "Master 7" or "Chief's 54" (now known as the Director's 54) awards can be denoted.

According to U.S. Army Pamphlet 670–1, the basic and senior versions of the Army National Guard Recruiting and Retention Badge are temporary badges that must be surrendered upon the completion of a soldier's recruiting assignment. The expert version of this badge is awarded to National Guard soldiers as a permanent award. However, Army National Guard Regulation 601-1 states that all three badges are permanent awards that may be worn on the Army uniform regardless of duty station.

=== Ribbon ===
Army Recruiting Ribbon –Next Higher: Military Outstanding Volunteer Service Medal –Next Lower: Army Sea Duty Ribbon

The Army Recruiting Ribbon was established in 2023 as part of the Soldier Referral Program. This allows all soldiers in the United States Army to participate in recruiting. All Army personnel, officer, warrant, or enlisted, who make a qualified referral that results in enlistment and shipping out to Basic Combat Training will be eligible for the ribbon. Individuals may earn the award four times, with each award worth 10 promotion points.

== U.S. Air Force and U.S. Space Force ==
=== Badges ===
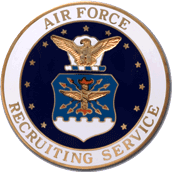
Basic Recruiter Badge

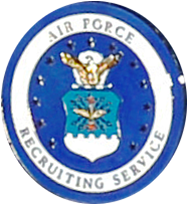
Certified Recruiter Badge

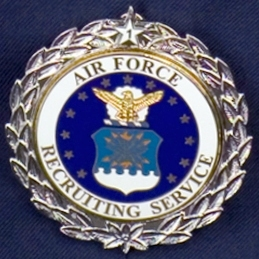
Senior Recruiter Badge with 1 Silver Recruiter Badge Award

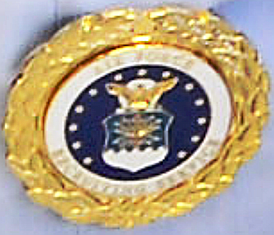
Gold Recruiter Badge

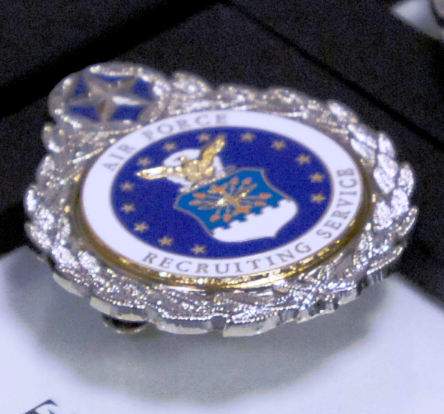
Master Recruiter Badge

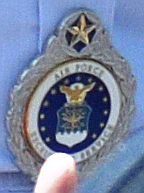
Command Master Recruiter Badge

The United States Air Force's Basic Recruiter Badge is authorized for wear by all personnel who are assigned to active duty Air Force recruiting stations. The badge is worn as a decoration centered on the left uniform pocket for males and centered on the right side of the uniform above the nameplate for females. Those recruiters who have completed certification as recruiters earn the Certified Recruiter Badge, which is identical to the Basic Recruiter Badge but has a blue ring that surrounds its perimeter. Depending on the recruiter's personal achievement, the recruiter can earn a Silver Recruiter Badge (badge surrounded with silver wreath) or Gold Recruiter Badge (badge surrounded with gold wreath), which is the highest award a recruiter can achieve. Also Air Force recruiters can earn the Senior Recruiter Badge, Master Recruiter Badge, or Command (Cmd) Master Recruiter Badge. The Senior Recruiter Badge is identical to the Silver Recruiter Badge but has a white star at the top of the wreath with a numerical designation denoting the number of times the senior recruiter has earned a Silver Recruiter Badge. The Master Recruiter Badge looks similar to the Senior Recruiter Badge but has a distinctive wreath atop the badge with a large three-dimensional (3D) silver nautical star set in a blue background. The Command Master Recruiter Badge is the same as the Master Recruiter Badge except the large 3D silver nautical star is replaced with a large 3D gold nautical star.

Recruiters earning their fourth silver wreath also earn the U.S. Air Force Silver Recruiter Ring while those earning the gold wreath receive the U.S. Air Force Gold Recruiter Ring.

The U.S. Air Force Recruiting Service Badge is considered a temporary decoration and must be surrendered upon a service member's completion of duty at the specified Recruiting Command.

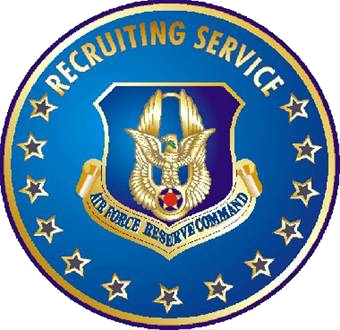
Air Force Reserve Command Recruiting Service Badge

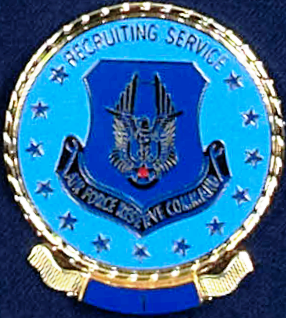
Air Force Reserve Command Recruiting Service Staff Badge

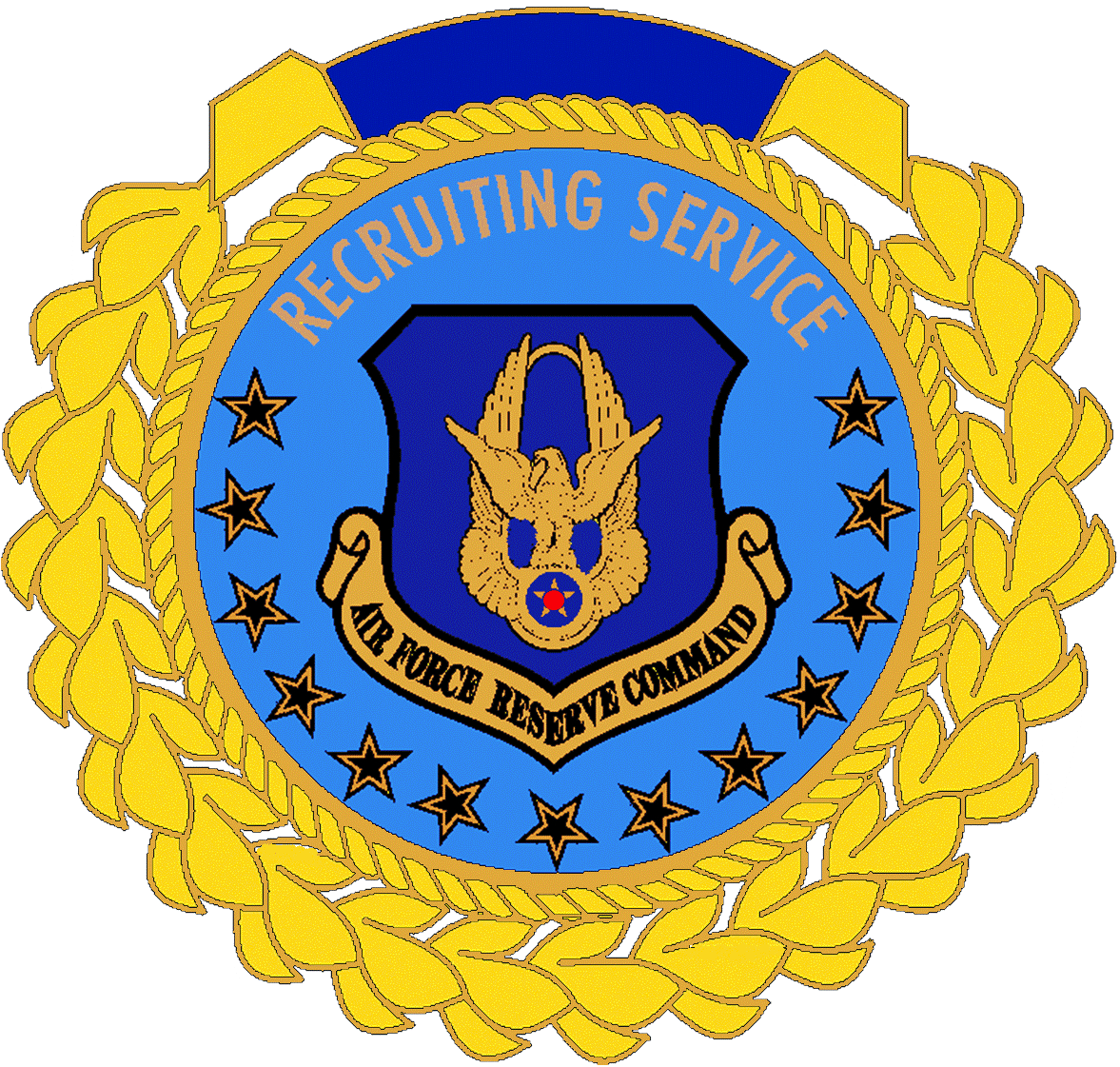
Air Force Reserve Command Recruiting Service Century Club Badge

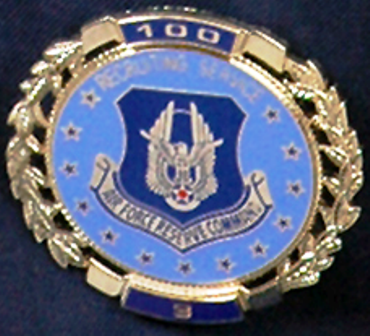
Air Force Reserve Command Recruiting Service Dual Century Club Badge

The U.S. Air Force Reserve Command Recruiting Service Badge is authorized to all personnel who are assigned to Air Force Reserve Command recruiting stations. The badge is worn as a decoration centered on the left uniform pocket for males and centered on the right side of the uniform above the nameplate for females. The badge may be modified with a gold rope that incorporates a gold banner at the bottom of the badge that denotes the recruiter's position (Staff, Assistant Senior, Senior, or Medical), referred to as the Staff Badge. Additionally, the badge may be modified with a gold wreath which incorporates a gold banner atop the badge denoting a recruiter's personal achievement (100, 200, or Master); these badges are called "Century Club Badges." Staff, Assistant Senior, Senior, or Medical recruiters with century awards have recruiter badges that are modified with a gold wreath that incorporates gold banners at the top and bottom of the badge denoting both achievement and position; these badges are called "Dual Century Club Badges." Recent official Air Force photographs of Air Force Reserve Command Recruiters wearing the Staff and Dual Century Club Badges have a numerical designation in the bottom banner where the recruiter's position is usually noted. This numerical designation could be a change in how positions are identified on the recruiter badge; however, no documentation describing this change has been found.

An earned AFRC recruiting service badge is authorized for permanent wear by Airmen with an 8R special duty identifier in their records.

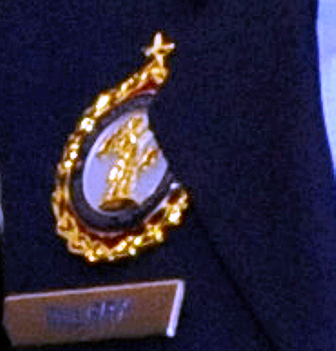
ANG Senior Gold Recruiting Service Badge, as worn on the female service dress uniform

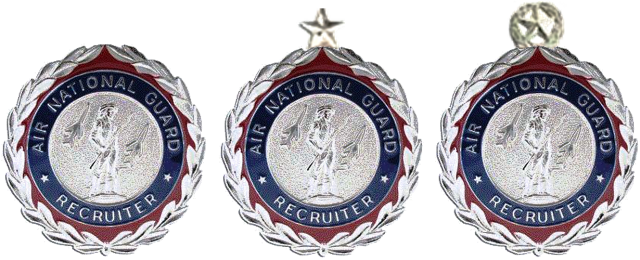
ANG Recruiting Service Badges (left to right: Basic, Senior, and Master)

The U.S. Air National Guard (ANG) Recruiting Service Badge is authorized to all personnel who are assigned to Air National Guard recruiting stations. The badge is worn as a decoration centered on the left uniform pocket for males and centered on the right side of the uniform above the nameplate for females. The badge is issued in three degrees; basic, senior, and master. The senior and master versions of the badge have a star or star with wreath, respectively, which are perched atop of the badge. There are gold variants of each badge which denote personal awards in recruiting and retention.

An earned ANG recruiting service badge is authorized for permanent wear by Airmen with an 8R special duty identifier in their records.

=== Ribbons ===
Former Air Force Recruiter Ribbon

Since 4 September 2014, service as a recruiter is recognized by the award of the Developmental Special Duty Ribbon, along with Air Force and Space Force training instructors.

Developmental Special Duty Ribbon (USAF & USSF)

Prior to the creation of the Special Duty ribbon, the Air Force Recruiter Ribbon was established by order of the Secretary of the Air Force on June 21, 2000. It was worth 2 points in the Weighted Airmen Promotion System at one point, and was declared obsolete in 2014. Personnel graduating from the Air Force Recruiting School had worn the Air Force Recruiter Ribbon immediately provided that the service member is serving in a United States Air Force Command. After thirty six months of recruiting duty, the award was awarded permanently providing the service member's tour as a recruiter has been free of disciplinary action. Additional awards of the Air Force Recruiter Ribbon were denoted by oak leaf clusters, and was carried on to the Special Duty ribbon, and the award was retroactive to any member of the Air Force who performed thirty six months or more as an Air Force recruiter, provided that the service member was on active duty after June 2000.

== U.S. Navy ==
=== Badges ===
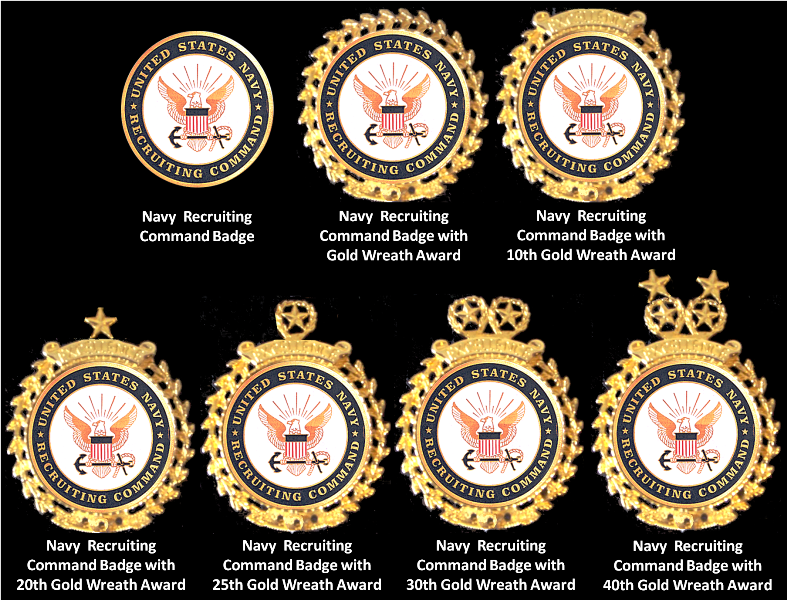
U.S. Navy Recruiting Command Badges

The U.S. Navy Recruiting Command Badge is worn by all Navy personnel while assigned to duty with the Navy Recruiting Command. Excellent performance, meeting criteria set by Commanding Officer Navy Recruiting Command, is acknowledged with the addition of a gold metallic wreath, called the "Gold Wreath Award," that surrounds the badge. Subsequent awards of excellence are denoted with 5/16 inch silver stars at the bottom of the wreath. Once a recruiter has achieved their 5th award, the silver stars are replaced with a gold star. Once a recruiter has achieved their 10th award, the wreath is upgraded with a gold scroll that's incorporated into the top of the wreath with the word "Excellence" embossed on the scroll. Subsequent achievements in excellence are denoted with the appropriate silver and/or gold star(s) at the bottom of the wreath. This progression continues using a large gold star on top of the scroll to signify the 20th award, a large gold star with wreath for the 25th, and two large gold stars and wreaths for the 30th. Silver and gold stars at the bottom of the wreath are used to signify awards 31 through 39 and four large gold stars, two with wreaths on top of the badge, are used to denote the 40th award. A Navy recruiter can earn up to 49 consecutive gold wreath awards for achievements in recruiting.

The U.S. Navy Recruiting Command badge is a temporary badge that must be surrendered upon completion of a recruiter's tour of duty as a Navy Recruiter.

=== Ribbon ===
Navy Recruiting Service Ribbon –Next Higher: Navy & Marine Corps Overseas Service Ribbon –Next Lower: Navy Accession Training Service Ribbon

The Navy Recruiting Service Ribbon was established by order of the Secretary of the Navy in February 1989. The first issuance of the award was made on June 1 of that same year with the award retroactive to July 1, 1973.

To be awarded the Navy Recruiting Service Ribbon, a service member must be assigned to one of the United States Navy's Major Recruiting Commands and must complete a standard three-year tour of duty. Award of the Navy Recruiting Service Ribbon is open to all branches of the Navy, including reservists on active duty for special work (ADSW) programs.

All those qualifying for the Navy Recruiting Service Ribbon must receive a recommendation from their Commanding officer before the ribbon is presented. Additional awards of the Navy Recruiting Service Ribbon are denoted by service stars. Bronze numerals, placed near the right edge of the ribbon, are used to denote the number of Gold Wreath awards earned for superior productivity.

Since none of the Navy's recruiting badges are permanent awards, the Navy Recruiting Service Ribbon serves as a permanent award to recognize service as a recruiter.

== United States Marine Corps ==
Marine Corps Recruiting Ribbon

The United States Marine Corps does not issue a recruiter badge. The Marine Corps Recruiting Ribbon was authorized by order of the secretary of the navy on June 7, 1995, with retroactive presentations to January 1, 1973. The Marine Corps Recruiting Ribbon is awarded to Marine Corps officers and enlisted personnel who complete a standard 36-month tour in a United States Marine Corps Recruiting Command.

Eligible Billets: (a) Marines possessing MOS 4810 or 8412 and have served in MOS 4810 or 8412 billets. (b) Marines possessing MOS 8411 and assigned to duty in a recruiting billet (MOS 8411). (c) Marine Corps Recruiting Command Headquarters. (d) Marine Corps Districts: CO; operations office; assistant for officer programs; prior service recruiting officer; assistant for aviation officer procurement; assistant for enlisted recruiting; and sergeant major. (e) Recruiting Stations: Commanding officer; executive officer; operations officer; officer selection officer; and sergeant major. (f) Command recruiters, (also known as career planners), recruiter aides, and recruiter assistants are not eligible for the MCRR.

== U.S. Coast Guard ==
=== Badges ===
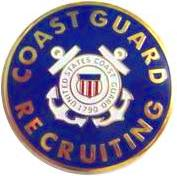
Coast Guard Recruiting Badge

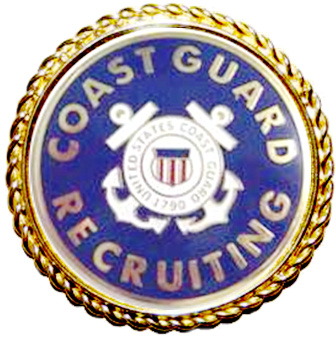
Coast Guard Recruiting Badge with Wreath

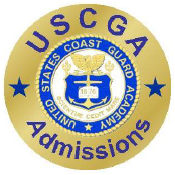
Coast Guard Academy Admissions Recruiting Badge

The U.S. Coast Guard Recruiting Badge is authorized for wear by those personnel assigned as full-time United States Coast Guard recruiters. The badge may be upgraded with a gold wreath which is awarded to Guardsmen who have successfully completed Recruiter School and have completed the Personnel Qualification Standard. The badge is worn on the left pocket of active duty Coast Guard uniforms and is a temporary decoration which must be surrendered upon departure from a Recruiting Command.

The U.S. Coast Guard Academy Admissions Recruiting Badge is authorized for wear by Coast Guard personnel assigned to a Coast Guard Academy Admissions Division billet. The badge is worn on the left pocket of active duty Coast Guard uniforms and is a temporary decoration which must be surrendered upon reassignment outside of the Academy Admissions Division.

=== Ribbon ===
Coast Guard Recruiting Service Ribbon —Next Higher: Basic Training Honor Graduate Ribbon –Next Lower: Marksmanship ribbon

The Coast Guard Recruiting Service Ribbon was created by the Commandant of the United States Coast Guard on November 2, 1995. The award is retroactive to January 1, 1980, and is presented to any member of the Coast Guard who completes a standard two-year tour as a Coast Guard Recruiter.

Additional awards of the Coast Guard Recruiting Service Ribbon are denoted by service stars. Since none of the Coast Guard recruiting badges are permanent awards, the Coast Guard presents their recruiters with the Coast Guard Recruiting Service Ribbon. This ribbon is awarded once a recruiter has completed a two years tour as a recruiter. Additional awards of are denoted by service stars.

== U.S. Public Health Service Commissioned Corps ==
=== Badges ===
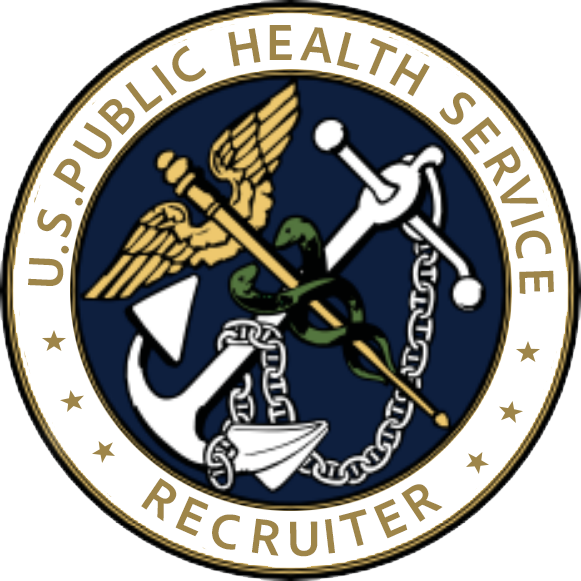
PHSCC Recruiter Badge

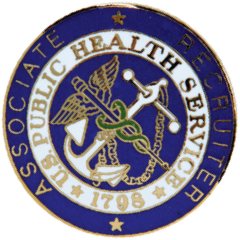
PHSCC Associate Recruiter Badge

The U.S. Public Health Service Commissioned Corps Recruiter Badges are authorized for wear by those officers assigned as part-time or full-time U.S. Public Health Service Commissioned Corps (PHSCC) recruiters. There are three levels of PHSCC recruiters; Recruiter, Associate Recruiter Lead, and Associate Recruiter corresponding to two different recruiter badges; the PHSCC Recruiter Badge and the PHSCC Associate Recruiter Badge. The badges are temporary decorations and must be surrendered upon completion of their recruiting duties.

In an attempt to make full use of the PHSCC existing recruitment resources to obtain candidates for the Corps, the Associate Recruiter Program (ARP) was established to be a volunteer program. The success of the ARP relies on participation of active-duty officers, inactive reserve officers, retired officers, students, civilians, operating divisions, staff divisions, and other organizations to which Corps officers are assigned. Although these officers are not required to be a part of the ARP to recruit, enrollment allows the Corps to recognize their efforts. Once enrolled, an Associate Recruiter is issued a PHSCC Associate Recruiter Badge as a symbol that distinguishes an individual's involvement in recruitment activities for the Corps.

=== Ribbon ===
Public Health Service Recruitment Service Award ribbon

After three consecutive years as either a full-time recruiter or active status as an associate recruiter, a USPHSCC officer is eligible to be awarded the Public Health Service Recruitment Service Award.

== NOAA Commissioned Officer Corps ==
The NOAA Recruiting Achievement Award ribbon

The National Oceanic and Atmospheric Administration Commissioned Officer Corps (informally the NOAA Corps) does not issue a recruiter badge but does issue permanent ribbon, the NOAA Recruiting Achievement Award.

== See also ==
- United States aircrew badges
- United States astronaut badges
- United States aviator badges
- United States balloon pilot badges
- United States diver badges
- Military recruitment
- Military badges of the United States
- Awards and decorations of the Public Health Service
- Obsolete badges of the United States military
