= Flight Engineer Badge =

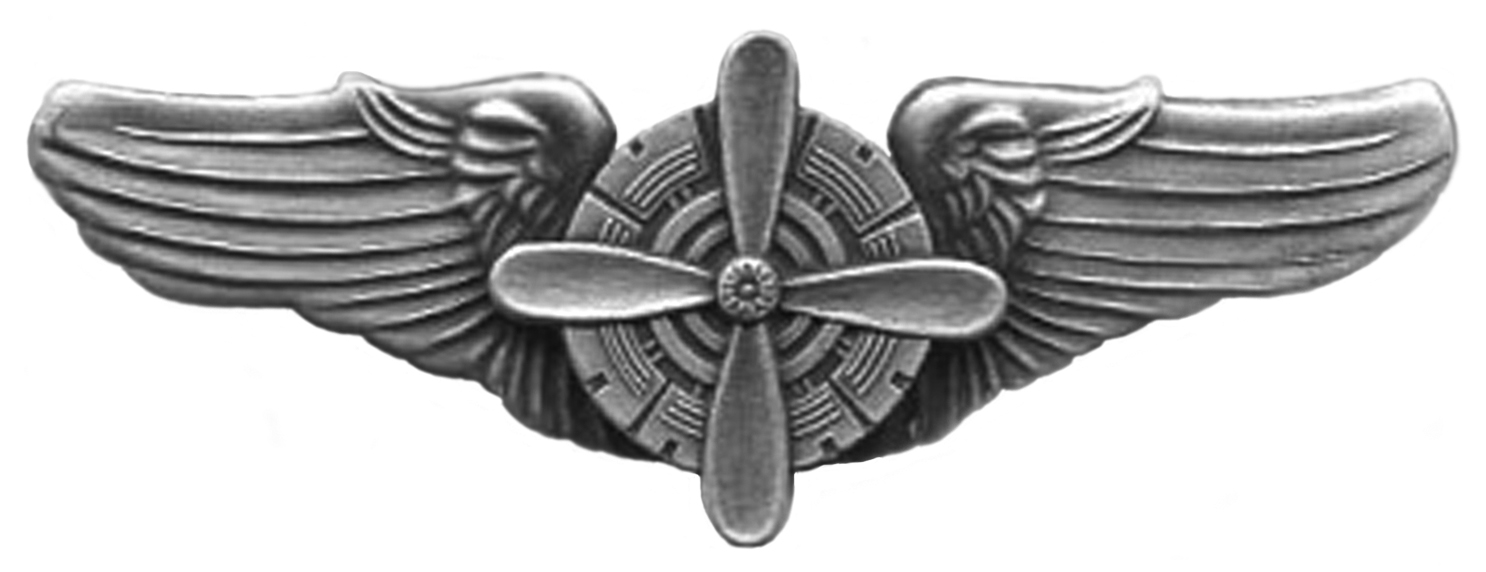

The Flight Engineer Badge was a qualification badge of the United States Army Air Forces authorized late in the Second World War on 19 June 1945. It was awarded to those military officers and NCOs who had qualified as flight engineers on board a military aircraft. As aircraft grew increasingly complex, the need arose for an in-flight specialist dedicated to monitoring and operating the various systems. However, prior to the creation of their own distinctive wings, flight engineers wore aircrew wings.

During the Korean War, the Flight Engineer Badge was slowly phased out by the United States Air Force and replaced with the Aircrew Badge. By 1962, the Flight Engineer Badge was no longer issued and had been declared obsolete. However, regulations through the early 1970s authorized USAF personnel who had been "...granted aeronautical ratings no longer current ... to wear the aviation badge that was in effect when the rating was granted." The Flight Engineer Badge continued to be worn by some remaining World War II and Korean War veterans until they eventually retired or otherwise left military service. The badge is still worn today by some flight engineers as unofficial novelty badges, but only on flight suits during inflight operations. The official design incorporated a four-bladed propeller with 18 radial engine cylinders.

== See also ==
- Obsolete badges of the United States military
- Military badges of the United States
