= Bombardier Badge =

Badge of the United States military

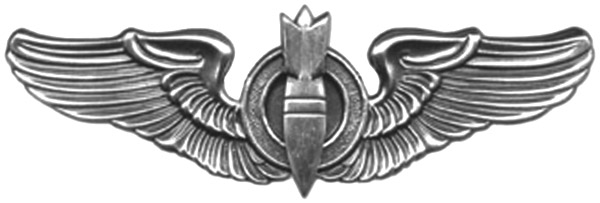

The Bombardier Badge was a military badge of the United States military which was issued between the years of 1918 and 1949. The decoration was intended to recognize the military training and qualification required by those servicemen who were bombardiers on board military aircraft.

Originally known as the Bombing Aviator Badge, the Bombardier Badge was first issued by the United States Army Air Service during the First World War. The badge consisted of a standard observer badge, centred upon which was a downward facing bomb. The badge remained unchanged until the late 1930s, at which time it was redesignated the Bombardier Badge. This change was primarily made due to the rapid advances in aircraft (and aircraft bombing technology) that took place between 1920 and 1939.

During World War II, the Bombardier Badge was a common aeronautical badge of the United States Army Air Forces. The badge was issued to all military bombardiers upon completion of basic flight training and advanced bomber instruction.

With the creation of the United States Air Force in 1947, the Bombardier Badge was gradually phased out and none were issued after 1949. The modern-day Navigator Badge is considered the U.S. Air Force successor to the Bombardier Badge.

Physically the badge had stamped sterling silver wings, a bomb like look in the middle, and a pin on the back.

== See also ==
- Obsolete badges of the United States military
