= Combat crew badge =

Combat Crew Badge
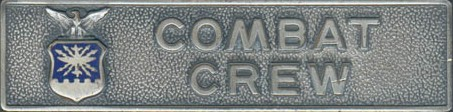
- Type: Badge
- Awarded for: Active services on a USAF combat crew
- Presented by: United States Air Force
- Eligibility: Serving with a U.S. Air Force combat crew
- Status: No longer awarded
- Established: September 1, 1964
- Final award: August 1993

Precedence
- Next (higher): None
- Related: USAF Combat Readiness Medal

The Combat Crew Badge was established by the United States Air Force on September 1, 1964. It was worn by those USAF personnel serving in positions where they were accruing creditable service towards the Combat Readiness Medal as outlined in U.S. Air Force regulation 900-48. It was a qualification badge and not a medal; it was therefore not a permanent award. The Air Force eliminated the Combat Crew Badge from wear in August 1993. This was done under the auspices of addressing uniform accoutrements to eliminate duplication, achieve standardization, and promote an uncluttered appearance. The badge was worn on the wearer's right side above the name tag.

== See also ==
Obsolete badges of the United States military
