= Combat Readiness Medal =

Award of the United States Air and Space Forces

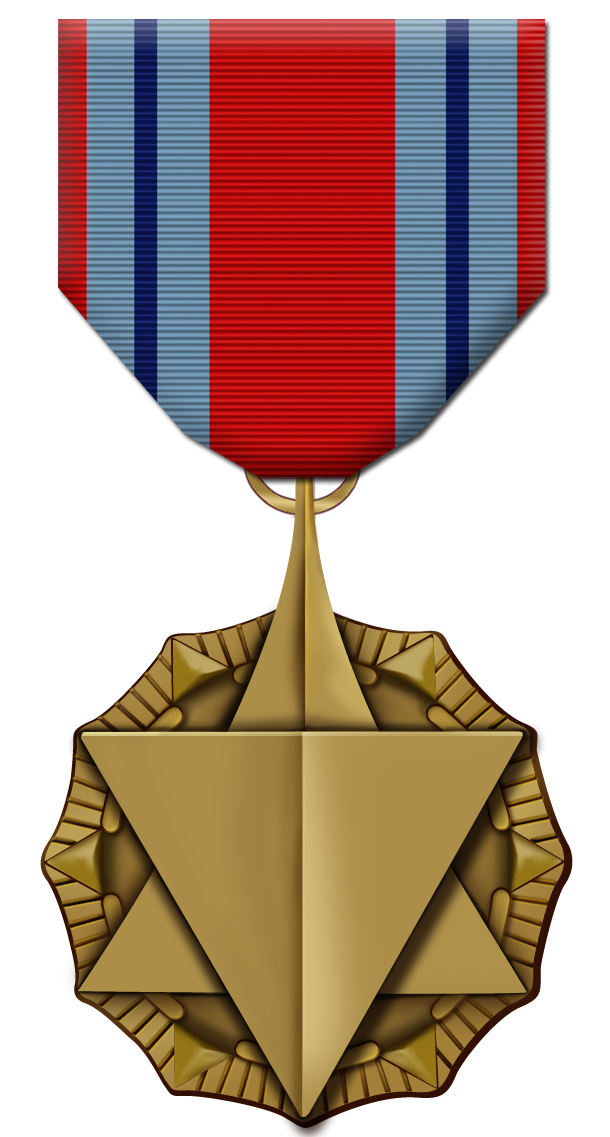
- Combat Readiness Medal
- Type: Military medal Service medal
- Awarded for: "Accomplished sustained individual combat mission readiness or undertaken the preparedness for direct weapon-system employment"
- Presented by: The Department of the Air Force
- Eligibility: Members of the U.S. Air Force and U.S. Space Force
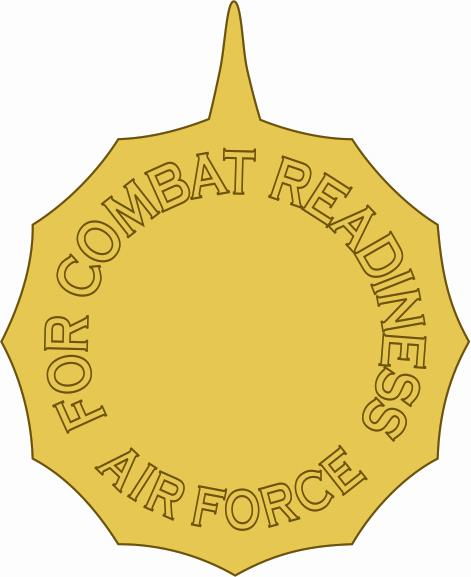
- Reverse
- Status: Current
- Established: 9 March 1964
- Combat Readiness Medal ribbon

Precedence
- Next (higher): Prisoner of War Medal
- Next (lower): Good Conduct Medals

The Combat Readiness Medal is an award of the United States Air Force and United States Space Force created in 1964. The original Combat Readiness Medal was an award senior to the Air Force Commendation Medal, and it was awarded for superior and meritorious duty to the United States Air Force. The award criteria for the medal were revised in 1967 and the Combat Readiness Medal adopted the designation as a service medal.

The Combat Readiness Medal is awarded to any member of U.S. Air Force or U.S. Space Force, who have accomplished sustained individual combat mission readiness in an Air Force or Space Force weapon system or who have undertaken the preparedness for direct weapon-system employment. A service member must have completed 24 cumulative months of sustained duty performance for the medal to be received.

The Combat Readiness Medal is given as a service award by an Air Force Major Command or Space Force Field Command. In many cases, those receiving the award have also qualified for the Air Medal, the Aerial Achievement Medal or the Nuclear Deterrence Operations Service Medal. For aeronautically rated Air Force officers and enlisted aircrew personnel, it is not unusual to receive one or both of the flight crew medals simultaneously with the Combat Readiness Medal.

The medal was designed by the Institute of Heraldry. On the obverse, it has an inverted triangle on top of a delta-swept winglike object, both representing supersonic aircraft. This design is enclosed by a stylized compass rose, with triangles at the points, indicating the worldwide nature of the mission of the Air Force. The reverse of the medal has the inscription, "For Combat Readiness--Air Force" in a circle, near the outer edge of the medal. The ribbon has a wide center stripe of red, flanked on either side by a narrow stripe of light blue, thin stripe of dark blue, narrow stripe of light blue with a stripe of red at the edge.

Multiple presentations of the Combat Readiness Medal are authorized, with additional awards denoted by oak leaf clusters. The Combat crew badge, a qualification accoutrement worn by crew members collecting time towards the medal, is no longer awarded.

If an Air Force or Space Force member has the Combat Readiness Medal and does the Blue to Green program (Air Force/Space Force to Army transition) they are still authorized to wear the medal, but unlike in the Air Force and Space Force, it will be worn as the last medal/ribbon, but before any foreign awards.
