= Obsolete badges of the United States military =

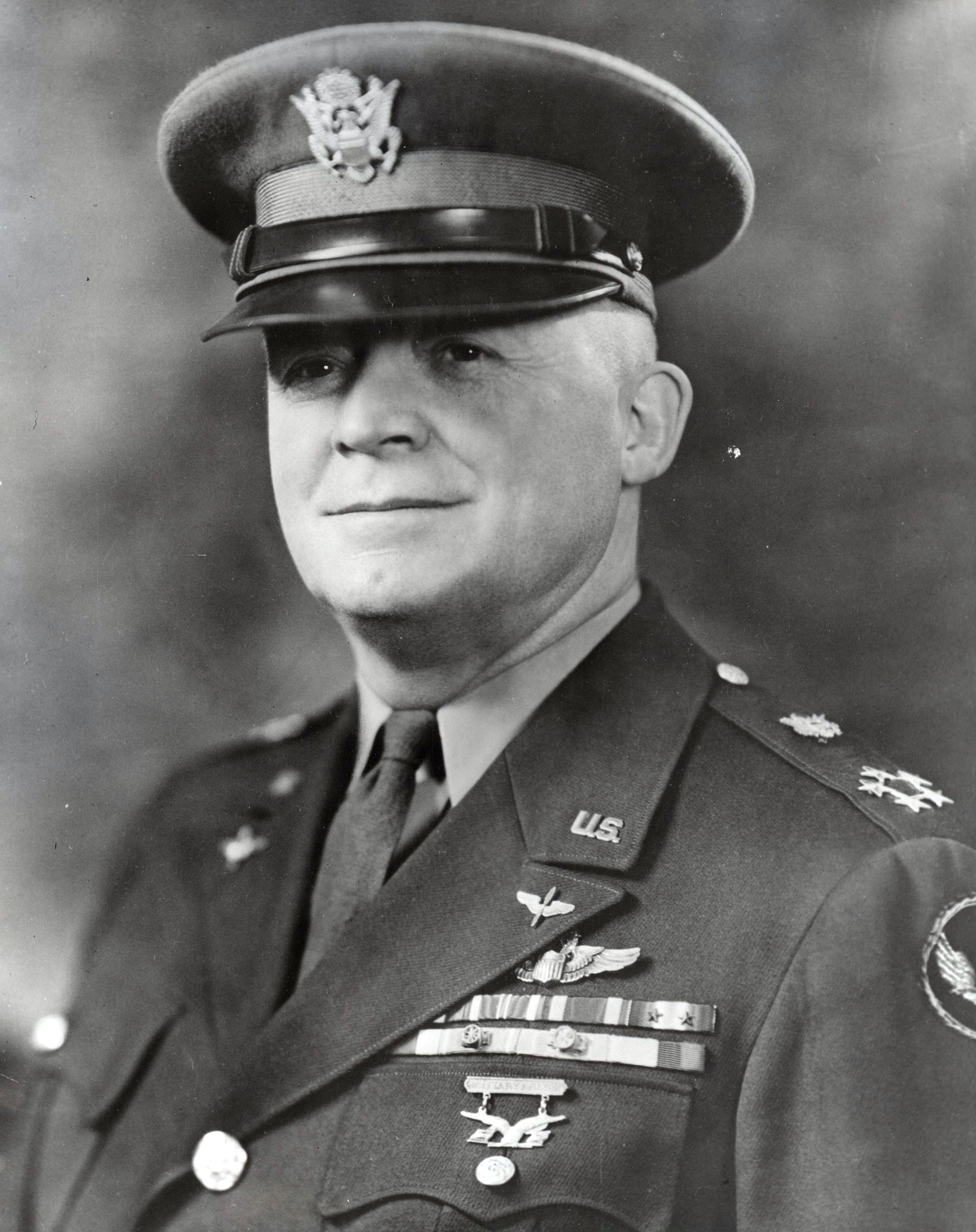
Henry "Hap" Arnold wearing the Army Air Forces' Master Pilot Badge (above ribbons) and Army Signal Corps' Military Aviator Badge (below ribbons)

Obsolete badges of the United States military are a number of U.S. military insignia which were issued in the 20th and 21st centuries that are no longer used today. After World War II, many badges were phased out of the United States Armed Forces in favor of more modern military badges used today.

A unique obsolete badge situation occurred with General of the Air Force Henry H. Arnold, who in 1913 was among the 24 Army pilots to receive the first Military Aviator Badge, an eagle bearing Signal Corps flags suspended from a bar. Replaced in 1917 by the more conventional "wings" embroidered design (authorized as an oxidized silver badge in 1921), Arnold displayed both types on his uniform throughout his career. The original Military Aviator Badge design can be seen in pictures of him in uniform.

The following is a listing of obsolete U.S. military badges and insignia organized by branch of service.

== Joint Service Badges ==
Badge	Example	Notes
The National Match Team ("Dogs of War") Badge		Replaced with bronze, silver, and gold medals in 1919.
White House Service Badge		Replaced by the Presidential Service Badge on 1 September 1964
Vice Presidential Service Badge		Replaced with new design on 19 July 1976
Office of the Joint Chiefs of Staff Identification Badge		Replaced with new design on 4 October 2021

== U.S. Army ==
=== Army Aviation Section/Air Service ===
Badge/Insignia	Example
Signal Corps Military Aviator Badge	
Air Service Airplane Pilot Badge	
Bombing Aviator Badge	
Aeronaut Badge	
Enlisted Aviator Badge	
Observer Badge	
Wound Chevron	

=== Army Air Forces ===
Badge	Example
Aerial Gunner Badge	
Airship Pilot Badge	
Balloon Pilot Badge	
Balloon Observer Badge	
Bombardier Badge	
Flight Engineer Badge	
Flight Nurse Badge	
Flight Surgeon Badge	
Flight Surgeon Dentist Badge	
Glider Pilot Badge	
Instructor Badge	
Liaison Pilot Badge	
Navigator Badge	
Observer Badge	
Service Pilot Badge	
Technical Observer Badge	
Women Airforce Service Pilots Badge	
Women Airforce Service Pilots Badge (early version)	
Army Air Forces Technician Badge	
Distinguished Aerial Badges	

=== Regular Army ===
Badge/Insignia	Example	Notes
Marksman Buttons		Replaced by Rifle Marksmanship Badges in 1897
Marksmanship Prize Badges		Replaced by Team Marksmanship Badges in 1903
Tank Service Insignia		Replaced by Tank Corps Insignia on 7 May 1918
Artillery Qualification Badges		Retired in 1913 and reintroduced as a qualification clasp for the Marksmanship Qualification Badges in 1921
Tank Corps Insignia		Replaced by Infantry (Tanks) Insignia on 16 Mar 1921
Rifle Marksmanship Badges		Replaced by Marksmanship Qualification Badges in 1921 and adopted by the Marine Corps.
Pistol Marksmanship Badges		In 1915, the expert version of the badge was replaced with a new design, which lives on in today's U.S. Marine Corps Expert Pistol Badge. All pistol badges were replaced by the Marksmanship Qualification Badge with Pistol Clasp in 1921 and adopted by the Marine Corps.
Infantry (Tanks) Insignia		Replaced with a new design on 21 March 1922
Team Marksmanship Badges		Replaced with new three piece design between 1922 and 1924
Corps of Intelligence Police Identification Badge		Replaced by Counterintelligence Special Agent Identification Badge on 13 December 1941
Infantry (Tanks) Insignia		Replaced by Armor Force Branch Insignia on 25 February 1942
Tank Destroyer Corps Insignia		Retired on 28 November 1944
Counterintelligence Special Agent Identification Badge		Replaced with a different design between 1947 and 1948
Distinguished Automatic Rifleman Badge		Retired in the late 1940s or early 1950s
Coast Artillery Corps Insignia		Retired on 19 December 1950
Armor Force Branch Insignia		Replaced by Armor Branch Insignia in February 1951
Team Marksmanship Badges		Replaced by Army Excellence-in-Competition Badges in 1958
Glider Badge		Retired on 3 May 1961
Military Intelligence (USAR) Insignia		Replaced by Military Intelligence Corps Insignia on 1 July 1962
Army Security Branch (USAR) Insignia		Replaced by Military Intelligence Corps Insignia on 1 July 1967
Women's Army Corps Insignia		Retired on 20 October 1978
Indian Scouts Insignia / 1st Special Service Force Insignia		The Indian Scouts Insignia was retired in 1926, brought back into service in 1942 as the 1st Special Service Force Insignia until 1944, then reintroduced as the Special Forces Branch Insignia in 1984.
Counterintelligence Special Agent Identification Badge		Replaced with a different design
Driver and Mechanic Badge–Aviation Mechanic and Crew Chief		Replaced with Army Aviation Badges in January 1966
Air Assault Badge (11th Air Assault Division–Test)		Replaced with Airmobile Badge in April 1974 which was renamed the Air Assault Badge in January 1978
Recondo Badges (various designs)		Discontinued in the 1980s but a different version of it continues to be issued as a special skills badge in the U.S. Army Reserve Officers' Training Corps
Nuclear Reactor Operator Badges		Retired on 1 October 1990
Jungle Expert Badge (ARSOUTH)		Retired in 1999 and reinvented in 2014 as the Jungle Expert Tab for USARPAC
Reserve Recruiter Identification Badge		Replaced with the Army Recruiter Identification Badges in April 2001
Medical Department Recruiter Identification Badge		Replaced with the Army Recruiter Identification Badges in June 2001
Scuba Diver Badge		Replaced by the Special Operations Diver Badge on 17 September 2004
National Guard Recruiter and Retention Identification Badges		Replaced with new designs on 12 May 2008
Electronic Warfare Corps		Replaced with Cyber Branch insignia on 1 October 2018
Jungle Expert Tab (USARPAC)		Replaced with new design
Arctic Tab (USARAK)		Replaced with new design, later redesignated as a unit tab for USARPAC units assigned to Alaska
Physical Fitness Badge		Rescinded February 2024.
Counterintelligence Special Agent Badge		Replaced with Army Counterintelligence Special Agent Badge on 27 May 2025

== U.S. Marine Corps ==
Badge/Insignia	Example	Notes
Marksmanship Competition Badges		Replaced with new designs between 1910 and 1930.
Rifle Marksmanship Badges		Replaced by the Army's Marksmanship Qualification Badges in 1924, reinstituted in 1937, and replaced by the Marine Corps's current Rifle Qualification Badges in 1958
Marksmanship Qualification Badges		Adopted by the Army and replaced by Rifle Marksmanship Badges and Basic Badge in 1937.
Adjutant and Inspector's Department Insignia		
Paymaster's Department Insignia		
Quartermaster's Department Insignia		
Aide-de-Camp Insignias	Army or Marine Corps aide to a one-star flag officer Army or Marine Corps aide to a two-star flag officer Army or Marine Corps aide to a three-star flag officer	
Expert Team Rifleman Badge		
Basic Badge		Retired in December 1968
Military Police Badge		Replaced with a new design

== U.S. Navy ==
Badge/Insignia	Example	Notes
Sharpshooter's Badge		Replaced with Marksmanship Ribbons in 1920.
Naval Aviation Observer Insignia		Replaced with new design in October 1929
Expert Team Rifleman Badge		
Naval Aviation Observer (Tactical) Insignia		Replaced with Naval Aviation Observer Insignia in 1947
Naval Aviation Observer (Radar) Insignia		Replaced with Naval Aviation Observer Insignia in 1947
Naval Aviation Observer (Navigator) Insignia		Replaced with the Naval Aviation Observer Insignia in 1947; this badge is still in use by the U.S. Marine Corps as the Marine Aerial Navigator insignia.
Naval Flight Surgeon Insignia		Replaced with new design in 1952
Naval Flight Nurse Insignia		Replaced with new design in 1952
Balloon Pilot Insignia		Retired in 1978
Enlisted Special Warfare Insignia		Replaced with Special Warfare Insignia
Underwater Demolition Officer Insignia		Replaced with Special Warfare Insignia in 1975
Underwater Demolition Enlisted Insignia		Replaced with Special Warfare Insignia in 1975
Scuba Officer Insignia		
Navy Reserve Merchant Marine Insignia		Replaced by Strategic Sealift Officer Warfare Insignia in June 2011
MAA/Law Enforcement Badges		Some replaced and some discontinued in June 2011
Special Warfare Combatant-Craft Crewman Insignia		Replaced with three different skill level insignias on 19 August 2016

== U.S. Air Force ==
Badge/Insignia	Example	Notes
Air Force Command Flight Surgeon Badge		Replaced by Chief Flight Surgeon Badge on 1 June 1959
Air Force Parachutist Badges		Replaced by Army & Air Force Parachutist Badges in 1963
Air Police Badge		Replaced by Security Police Badge in November 1966
Air Force Training Instructor Badges		Replaced by Air Education and Training Command Instructor Badges
Gold National Excellence-In-Competition Badges		
Gold & Silver Elementary Excellence-In-Competition Badges		
Combat Control Team Crest		Replaced with new design in 1984
Air Force Recruiter Badges	Example of the Air Force Recruiter Badge, circa 1985/86 Example of the Air Force Silver Recruiter Badge, circa 1985/86	Replaced with new designs and additional grades/awards
Air Force Combat Crew Badge		Retired in August 1993
Aid–de–Camp Collar Insignia 1-4 President, Vice President, Secretary of Defense, Secretary of the Air Force 5-8 Chairman of the Joint Chiefs, Chief of Staff of the Air Force, Chief of the National Guard Bureau, Vice Chief of the National Guard Bureau 9-13 General Officers (five through one star)		First used in 1969 and discontinued in 1996. Higher offices like the President or Chief of Staff aides wear the organization's badge. General's aides do not have a replacement.
Special Operations Weather Team Crest		Replaced with Combat Weather Team Crest in 2002
Space and Missile Badges		Replaced by Space Operations Badges on 1 Nov 2005
Air Force Communications and Information Badges		Replaced by Cyberspace Support Badges on 1 June 2010
Air Force Honor Guard Badge		Replaced with new design
Air Force Remotely Piloted Aircraft Sensor Operator Badges		Replaced with Enlisted Aircrew Badges on 4 November 2016
Special Operations Weather Crest		Replaced with Special Reconnaissance Crest in 2019
Scuba Diver Badge		Replaced by the Air Force Combat Dive Badges in 2022

== U.S. Space Force ==
Badge	Example	Notes
Space Test Course Graduate Patch		Replaced with a new design in 2024.

== U.S. Coast Guard ==
Badge/Insignia	Example	Notes
Coast Guard Flight Officer Insignia		Discontinued on 22 November 1991
Office of the Secretary of Transportation Badge		Discontinued in 2003
Sector Command Identification Badges		Removed from Uniform Regulations in March 2012
Unit Command Identification Badges		Removed from Uniform Regulations in August 2018
Rating Force Master Chief Identification Badge		Replaced with a new design in August 2018

== See also ==
- Obsolete military awards of the United States
- United States Army branch insignia#Obsolete insignia
- List of United States Coast Guard ratings#Obsolete ratings (1990–present)
- List of United States Navy ratings#Discontinued and changed ratings (1972–present)
- Military badges of the United States
- Uniformed services of the United States
