= United States balloon pilot badges =

Badges of observation balloon & airship pilots

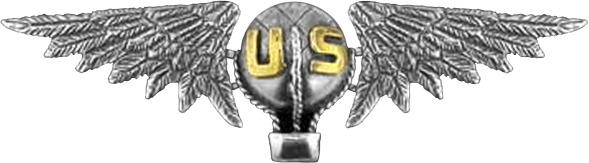
Original 1918 Aeronaut Badge

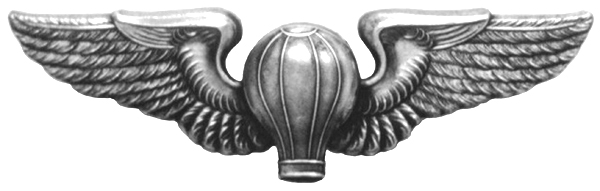
WWII-era Balloon Pilot Badge

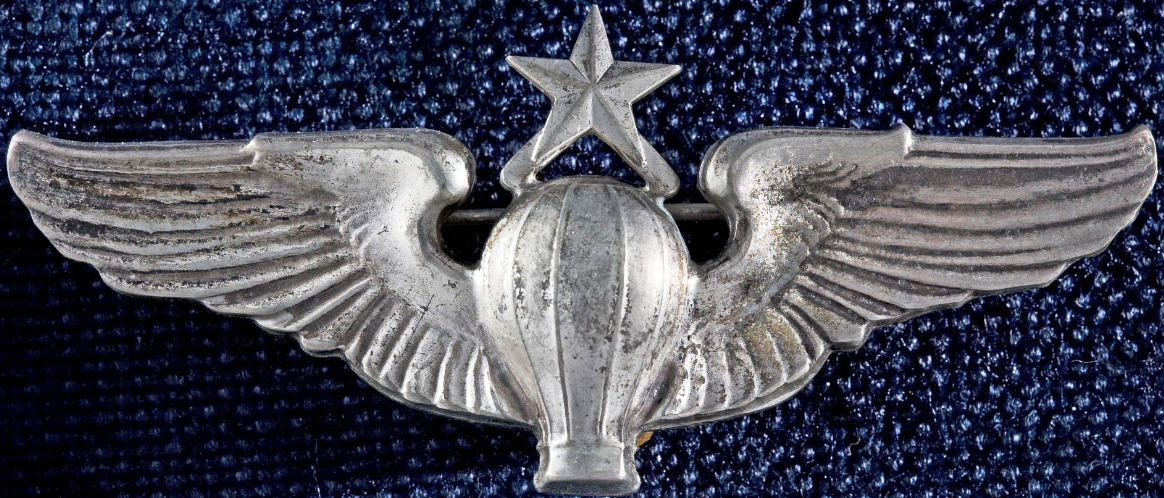
WWII Senior Balloon Pilot Badge

Airship Pilot Badge

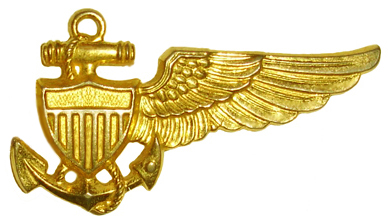
United States Navy and Marine Corps Balloon Pilot Insignia

The various balloon pilot badges of the United States Armed Forces are military badges created between 1918 and 1922. The badges recognized qualified airship/dirigible and observation balloon pilots. Such badges were issued by the U.S. Army and the U.S. Air Force as the "Balloon Pilot Badge" and "Airship Pilot Badge." Additionally, the U.S. Navy issued the "Balloon Pilot Insignia" (occasionally referred to as the "dirigible pilot insignia").

== United States Army and Air Force ==
Originally known as the Aeronaut Badge, the Balloon Pilot Badge was created in 1918 and awarded to pilots of military observation balloons. The badge consisted of a balloon centered on a standard Pilot's Badge and was issued in two degrees. The senior degree of the Aeronaut Badge was denoted by a star centered above the winged balloon.

The Aeronaut Badge was awarded under the authority of the United States Army Air Service and the United States Army Air Corps until the mid-1930s. The badge was then redesignated the Balloon Pilot Badge and, during the Second World War (WWII), was issued by the Army Air Forces. Like its predecessor, the Balloon Pilot Badge was issued in junior and senior degrees.

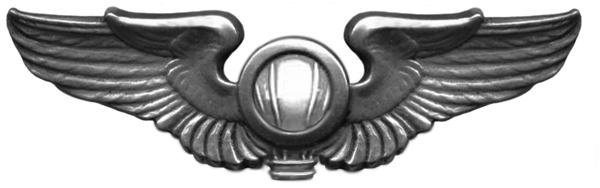
Balloon Observer Badge

The Army Air Forces also issued a Balloon Observer Badge for those who served as co-pilots and support crew on board military balloon craft.

In 1921 the Army authorized the "Airship Pilot Badge" to specifically recognize airship pilots (as opposed to other types of lighter-than-air craft). The badge was similar to the Balloon Pilot Badge, replacing the central observation balloon with the side-profile of the RN-1, a French-built airship.

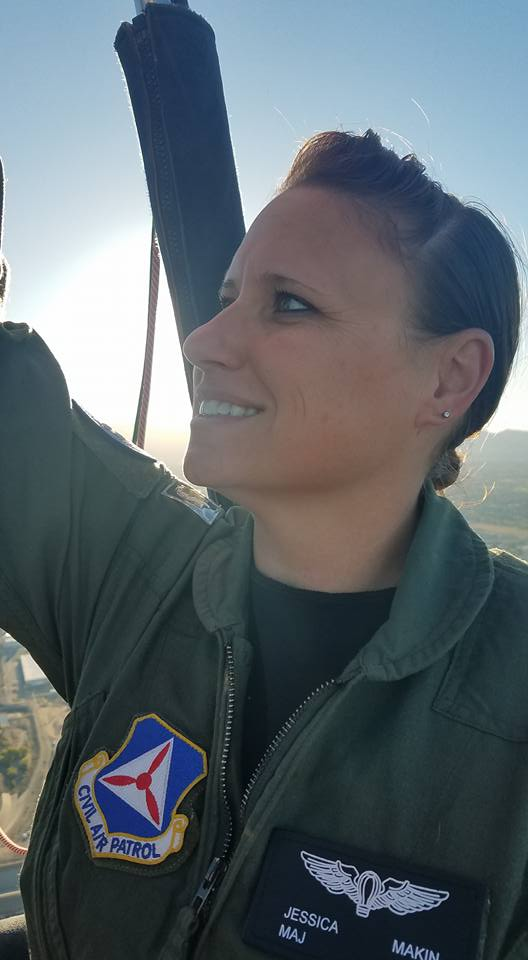
Balloon pilot, Civil Air Patrol Major Jessica Makin (2017); note the balloon pilot badge in the lower-right of the image on the major's name patch

Due to the aircraft technology advances of the 1940s, balloon aeronautics became militarily obsolete by the 1950s. The Airship Pilot Badge was discontinued in 1940 and the Balloon Pilot Badge was discontinued by the nascent U.S. Air Force in the 1950s. However, a slightly modified version of the basic balloon pilot badge is still issued by the U.S. Air Force Auxiliary's Civil Air Patrol.

== United States Navy ==
The Balloon Pilot Insignia (sometimes referred to as the balloon pilot badge, dirigible pilot insignia, or dirigible pilot badge) was a military decoration of the U.S. Navy and U.S. Marine Corps that was issued to those service members who received training and qualification as dirigible pilots. The badge first appeared in Navy Uniform Regulations in 1922, during which time the Navy was experimenting with lighter-than-air craft, as opposed to conventional, fixed-wing aircraft.

The Balloon Pilot Insignia was issued well into the 1970s, with occasional awards, on a case-by-case basis, to the end of the 20th century. The 1978 U.S. Navy Uniform Regulations removed the Balloon Pilot Insignia from the authorized list of aviation breast insignia. Although the insignia is considered obsolete, it may still be found on various insignia and badge charts promulgated through U.S. Navy instructions and publications.

The Balloon Pilot Insignia appears as a "half-wing" version of the Naval Aviator Insignia. Its design was based on early versions of the Observer Badge.

== See also ==
- United States aviator badges
- United States astronaut badges
- United States aircrew badges
- Obsolete badges of the United States military
