= United States aircrew badges =

- Type: Badge
- Awarded for: Aviation service
- Presented by: United States Armed Forces
- Status: Currently awarded
- Established: World War II

Army Precedence
- Next (higher): Any class 2 badge (e.g. Combat Medic, Expert Field Medic)
- Next (lower): Any class 4 badge (e.g. Air Assault, Airborne, Pathfinder)

United States aircrew badges, commonly known as aircrew wings or simply as wings, are qualification badges that are awarded by five of the United States Armed Forces to personnel who serve as aircrew members onboard military aircraft. The United States Space Force is the only armed service which does not issue its own aircrew badges, though Space Force personnel are permitted to wear such badges when earned via another service. Neither of the non-armed services of the U.S. uniformed services (the United States Public Health Service Commissioned Corps and the National Oceanic and Atmospheric Administration Commissioned Officer Corps) issue aircrew badges, though their personnel are generally permitted to wear such badges.

Aircrew badges are intended to recognize the training and qualifications required by aircrew of military aircraft. In order to qualify as an aircrew member and receive the appropriate aircrew badge, such personnel typically undergo advanced training in aircraft in-flight support roles. Pilots of the U.S. uniformed services are issued an appropriate aviator badge.

== U.S. Army ==
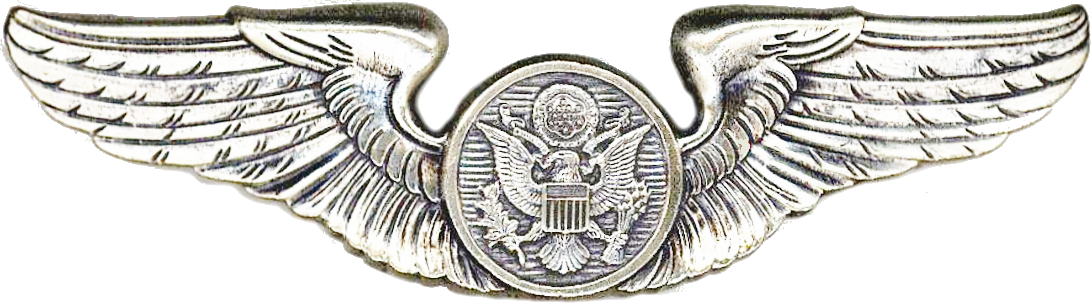
Aircrew Badge, World War II Army Air Forces design

Army Master Aviation Badge

The first version of the Aircrew Badge was issued by the Army Air Forces during the Second World War. The badge was similar in design to the Aviator Badge, however, and displayed an emblem denoting enlisted status on its circular shield, or escutcheon, centered between two wings. The emblem featured the arms of the United States of America, in clear relief generally against a horizontally lined background, on a disk with a raised rim.

Anyone trained in flight operations was authorized to wear this badge, including pilots, bombardiers, navigators, flight engineers, radio men and gunners. The badge was also awarded to certain ground personnel at the discretion of their commanding officer. Non-crewmembers eligible for the badge were individuals with flying status such as aircraft maintenance supervisors and technical inspectors. For example, aircrew badges were issued to Automatic Flight Control Equipment (A.F.C.E.) and Bombsight Shop personnel and others essential to "keep 'em flying" who flew instructional and maintenance flights but who did not actually take part in combat missions during World War II.

With the creation of the United States Air Force as a separate branch of service in 1947, the Army was left without an Aircrew Badge until the Korean War. At that time, to recognize the continued use of Army aviation, the Aircraft Crewman Badge was created. The badge was issued in three degrees: Basic, Senior, and Master. The level of seniority depended on the number of flight hours obtained and years of service in the United States Army.

On February 29, 2000, the Department of the Army officially changed the name of the Aircraft Crewman Badge to the Army Aviation Badge. The badge itself was not altered; however, the change was made retroactive to 1947, requiring updates to military records upon request from the military service member. This change essentially made army aircrew wings an "MOS Badge" awarded to all aviation MOSs, including non flying jobs such as Aviation Operations and Air Traffic Controllers. Thus, a crew chief who actually engages in aerial flight has no distinction from an air traffic controller because both are on flight status.

Although the Army Aviation Badge is intended for enlisted personnel, in rare cases the decoration can be awarded to officers.

For non-rated Army members who qualify for the Astronaut Badge, but have not yet participated in a qualifying spaceflight, the Army Aviation Badge may be awarded with the astronaut device appearing on the central shield.

== U.S. Air Force ==
U.S. Air Force Enlisted Aircrew Badge

U.S. Air Force Officer Aircrew Badge

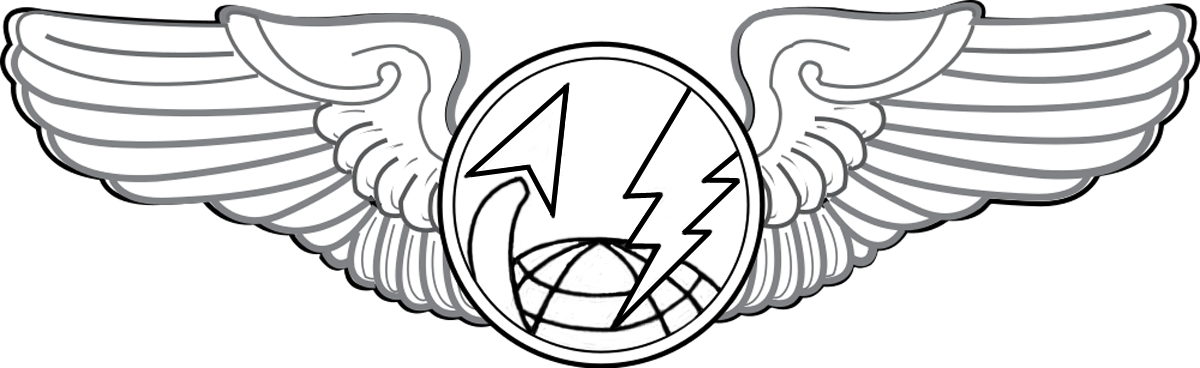
U.S. Air Force RPA Sensor Operator Badge, used from 2010 to 2016 (replaced by Enlisted Aircrew Badge)

The Air Force Aircrew Badge is a direct successor to the Army Air Forces version of the decoration. Originally known simply as the Aircrew Badge, the Air Force began issuing the decoration to enlisted Aircrew members in 1947. By the time of the Korean War, regulations had been established for a senior and master version of the badge, indicated by a star and wreath above the decoration. As with the Army Aviator Badge, seniority of the Aircrew Badge was determined by flight hours obtained and years of service in the Air Force.

With the decline of the Observer Badge, a need quickly arose to award an Aircrew Badge to officers who had been trained as in-flight support personnel. By the time of the Vietnam War, the Air Force had created an Officer Aircrew Badge which was issued to non-rated officers trained for in-flight operations. These badges began to lose a bit of value, as they became easier to obtain for Aircrew members, but was still considered extremely prestigious in regards to the Air Force. The enlisted version of the Aircrew Badge remained relatively the same and was now referred to as the Enlisted Aircrew Badge.

In the modern United States Air Force, the Enlisted Aircrew Badge is still issued to 1A0X1 (Inflight Refueling), 1A1X1 (Flight Engineer), 1A2X1 (Aircraft Loadmaster), 1A3X1 (Airborne Mission Systems Specialist), 1A4X1 (Airborne Operation Specialist)(now merged with 1A3X1), 1A6X1 (Flight Attendant), 1A8X1 (Airborne Cryptologic Language Analyst), 1A8X2 (Airborne Intelligence, Surveillance & Reconnaissance (ISR) Operator), 1A9X1 (Special Missions Aviator), 1Z1X1 (Pararescue), X3N0X6 (Aerial Combat Photojournalist), and X4N0X1 (Aeromedical Evacuation Specialist). Enlisted Remotely Piloted Aircraft (RPA) Sensor Operators (1U0X1) were previously awarded their own aircrew wings, beginning in 2010. On 4 Nov 2016, Air Force Instruction 11-402 was published, replacing the Enlisted RPA wings with the Enlisted Aircrew wings.

The Officer Aircrew Badge is less often awarded, usually to Combat Rescue Officers (CROs), Information Integration Officers (IIOs), Airborne Intelligence Officers (AIOs), Airborne Surveillance Officers (ASOs), Flight Test Engineers (FTEs), as well as selected communications and weather officers depending on assignment, such as Aerial Reconnaissance Weather Officers (ARWOs). The single exception to this policy was an Air Force FTE who was subsequently selected as a NASA mission specialist-astronaut for the Space Shuttle program. Since there was no provision for the USAF Officer Aircrew Badge with the Astronaut "shooting star" symbol, the Air Force opted to award this officer the Senior Navigator (now Senior Combat Systems Officer) Badge with the Astronaut "shooting star" symbol following her first space flight, this despite her never having completed either the Undergraduate Navigator Training (UNT) or Undergraduate Combat Systems Officer (UCT) flight training syllabi. The rationale of the USAF leadership for doing so at the time was under a little used codicil that the Navigator / CSO insignia could also be awarded as an "Air Force Observer" Badge. The number of officers awarded the Aircrew Badge dropped considerably in 1999, when Air Battle Managers became a rated career field, and thus began being issued their own separate aviation badge.

Initial award of the Officer and Enlisted Aircrew Badges occurs upon completion of training. Permanent award of the badges occurs upon 18 months of aviation service for career enlisted aviators (CAEs) or 18 months of aviation service and 12 paid months of operational flying duty for non-rated officers and non-career enlisted aviator enlisted aircrew. Permanent award can also occur in the following special conditions:

- Member participated in at least 10 combat missions as a primary aircrew member in a designated combat zone.
- Member is medically disqualified from further performance of aircrew member duty as a result of wounds received in action while in a designated combat zone.
- Member is medically disqualified from further performance of aircrew member duty as a result of injuries received in an aircraft mishap.
- Member was assigned to perform aircrew member duties and completed a minimum of one operational mission in space (50 miles above the earth).

The criteria for the Senior and Master/Chief level badges depends on status as a career enlisted aviator, non-rated officer, or non-career enlisted aviator enlisted aircrew. For careers enlisted aviators, award of the Senior Enlisted Aircrew Badge occurs after permanent award of basic badge, completion of least 7 years aviation service, and award of 5-skill level in a CEA AFSC. Award of the Chief Enlisted Aircrew Badge occurs after permanent award of basic and senior badges, completion of at least 15 years aviation service, and award of the 7-skill level in a CEA AFSC. For non-rated officers and non-career enlisted aviator enlisted aircrew, award of the Senior Officer or Senior Enlisted Aircrew Badge occurs after permanent award of basic badge, completion of at least 7 years aviation service, and 36 paid months of operational flying duty or at least 350 total hours logged as a non-rated officer or non- career enlisted aviator aircrew. Award of the Master Officer or Chief Enlisted Aircrew Badge occurs after permanent award of basic and senior badges, completion of at least 15 years aviation service, and 72 paid months of operational flying duty or at least 750 total hours logged as a non-rated officer or non-career enlisted aviator enlisted aircrew.

=== Civil Air Patrol ===
Air Force Auxiliary's Civil Air Patrol Aircrew Badge

A Civil Air Patrol member who has qualified as a Mission Scanner, Aerial Digital Imaging System Operator, Airborne Photographer, ARCHER Operator, ARCHER Trac Technician, Geospatial Information Interoperability Exploitation Portable Operator, Surrogate Unmanned Aerial System Green Flag Sensor Operator, or Highbird Radio Operator is considered to hold the CAP Aircrew Rating and may wear the CAP Aircrew Badge.

== U.S. Navy – U.S. Marine Corps – U.S. Coast Guard ==
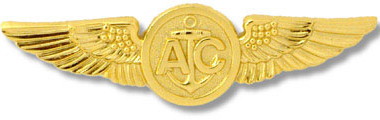
Naval (Navy, Marine Corps, Coast Guard) Aircrew Badge

The United States Navy, United States Marine Corps and United States Coast Guard issue the same version of the Aircrew Badge. The badge is a variation on the Naval Aviation Observer Badge with the letters AC centered on the badge's front.

In 2009, the Navy converted the badge from a qualification to a warfare designator like the Enlisted Aviation Warfare Specialist (EAWS), Enlisted Submarine Warfare Specialist, and Enlisted Surface Warfare Specialist (ESWS). The title was changed from Naval Aircrew (NAC) to Naval Aircrew Warfare Specialist (NAWS) and permitted USN Naval Aircrewman who also held the EAWS to place the Naval Aircrewman insignia in a senior position over their ribbons.

Known as Naval Aircrew Wings and Coast Guard Aircrew Wings, it is authorized for personnel who have undergone extensive training in flight operations of naval aircraft. Such training includes weapons management, electronic warfare, and water survival. Contrary to most other services, naval aircrewmen do not receive their wings after aircrew school. Rather, they receive (not awarded) their wings only after completing their platform respective Personnel Qualification Standards (PQS) (roughly 1 year past the completion of training). Marine Crew Chiefs before Dec. 1971 were allowed to wear them, after 1971 the Marine Corps started awarding them to Crew Chiefs & all Aircrewman.

The Naval and Coast Guard Aircrew Wings are issued in a single degree with no upgrade devices used or authorized. A Naval enlisted person who has qualified for his or her Naval Aircrew Badge places the initials "NAC" in parentheses after his or her rate and rating; for example, a Chief Cryptologic Technician Interpretive, after having qualified for their NAC Badge, is identified as a CTIC (NAC).

Most Officer Aircrew members who are not Naval Aviators (i.e., pilots) are Naval Flight Officers and receive the Naval Flight Officer insignia after completion of a flight training syllabus nearly as long as that of their pilot counterparts. Certain naval officers (most notably selected intelligence and cryptology officers assigned to P-3 Orion, P-8 Poseidon, E-6 Mercury and EP-3E Aries II aircraft missions) can qualify for the Naval Aviation Observer Badge following completion of a structured Personnel Qualification Standard (PQS) syllabus and a check flight qualifying them for observer duties on that aircraft. The Marine Corps also previously used this badge for Aerial Observers in the since-retired OV-10 Bronco and OA-4M Skyhawk II until eventually inputting these officers into SNFO training and designating them as Naval Flight Officers. Unlike Naval Aviators, Naval Flight Officers and Naval Flight Surgeons, Naval Aviation Observers have not completed a formal undergraduate flight training syllabus under the auspices of the Chief of Naval Air Training (CNATRA) and are not considered to be "aeronautically designated" officers in the Navy or Marine Corps.

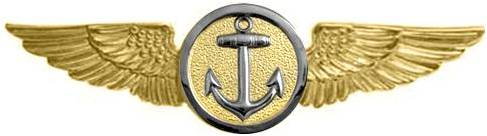
Naval Aviation Observer Badge

Aircrew wings are issued almost exclusively to enlisted aviation ratings, with the exception of other sailors in other naval ratings who are assigned to aircrew billets, including but not limited to Cryptologists (CT), Information Technicians (IT), Intelligence Specialists (IS), and Hospital Corpsmen (HM). Former enlisted personnel who attain officer status are permitted to continue wear of the insignia. However, for the first three years of enlistment these wings are unobtainable due to recent changes in qualification requirements.

=== Combat Aircrew Insignia ===
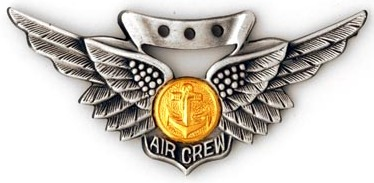
U.S. Marine Corps Combat Aircrew Badge

During World War II, numerous fleet requests occurred to recognize the work of the enlisted aircrew members flying in combat, the result was the creation of the Air Crew Insignia on 18 May 1943. While primarily an enlisted insignia, officers were eligible if they met the same criteria of Bureau of Naval Personnel (BUPERS) Circular Letter 90-43. The design was essentially the same as today's insignia except all pewter silver with no gold. A subsequent BUPERS Circular Letter 395-44 dated 30 Dec 1944, changed the design to the same as today with the modification of the gold center disc. In 1958, the insignia was redesignated the Combat Aircrew Insignia. In 1978, the Navy removed the insignia as authorized wear and then in 1994, the Marine Corps reestablished the insignia as it is known today as the Marine Combat Aircrew Badge. It is a decoration of the United States Marine Corps which is awarded to those enlisted personnel who have served as aircrew members on board combat flights.

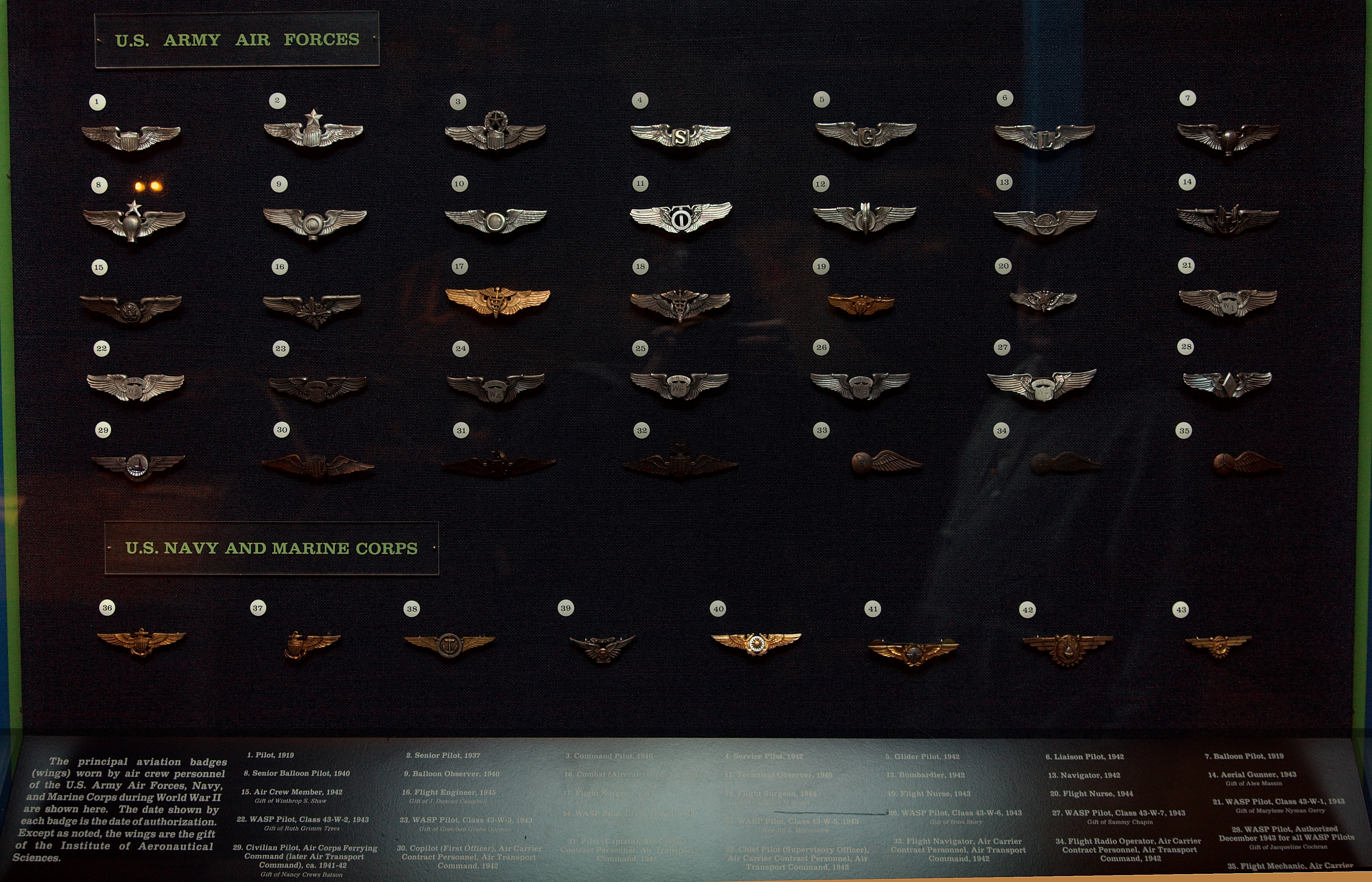
Examples of various aircrew badges at the National Air and Space Museum

For those who have participated in actual combat missions, gold service stars are worn pinned to the top of the decoration. MCO 1000.6G Para 3310.4 Upon earning more than three gold stars, silver stars are awarded in recognition of three gold stars, meaning three silver equates to nine gold plus the initial award of the combat aircrew device. MCO P1020 Para 4002.1F

The Marine Combat Aircrew Badge can be issued to service members of both the Marine Corps and United States Navy (while serving in a Marine Corps aviation squadron). Current regulations require a set number of combat 'points' to be earned before wear is authorized. It is not authorized to wear both the Combat Aircrew and Naval Aircrew pins at the same time. If an individual service member has been awarded both badges, they may decide which pin to wear on their uniform. A sailor who has qualified for the Combat Aircrew Badge and at least one gold star places the initials "CAC" in parentheses after their rate and rating; for example, a Hospital Corpsman 2nd Class (HM2), after having qualified for their CAC Badge, is identified as a HM2 (CAC).

== See also ==
- United States astronaut badges
- United States aviator badges
- United States balloon pilot badges
- United States diver badges
- United States recruiter awards
- Military badges of the United States
- Obsolete badges of the United States military
- Aircrew brevet

== Sources ==
- "Department of the Air Force Manual 11-402: Flying Operations: Aviation, Missile, and Parachutist Service" (PDF). US Air Force. 24 January 2025.
