= United States astronaut badges =

U.S. military and civilian qualification badge

United States astronaut qualification badges, insignia, and devices
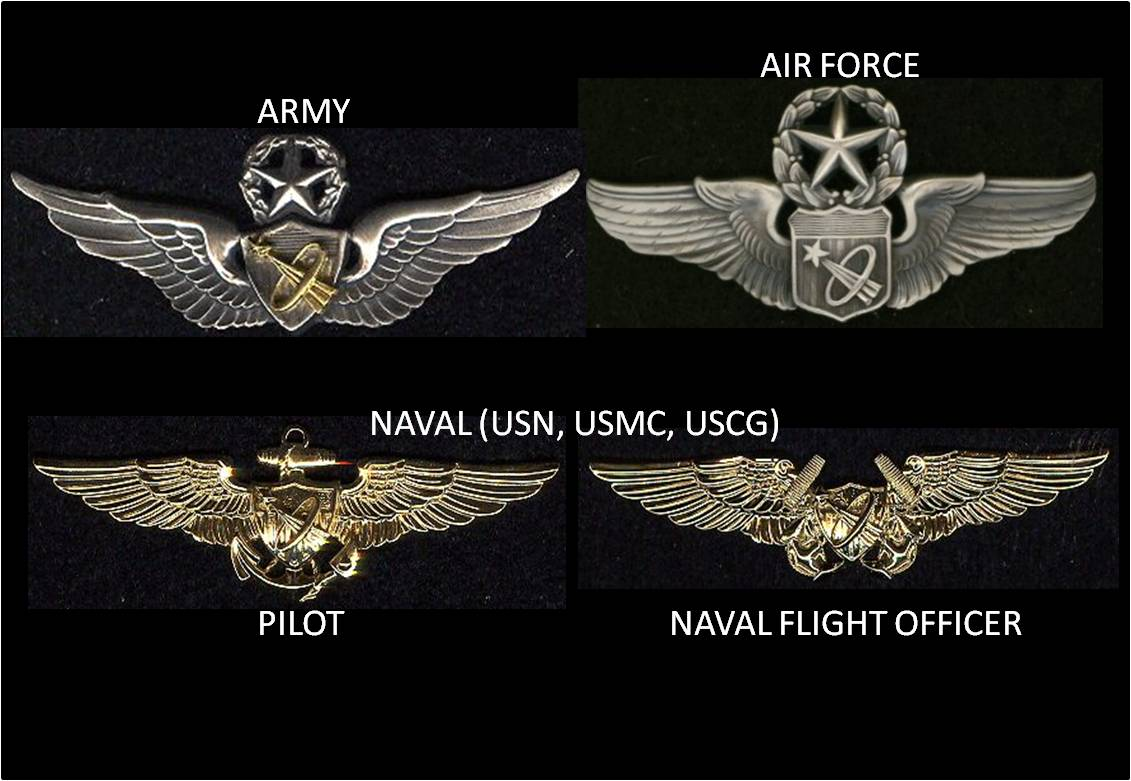
- Type: Badge
- Awarded for: Completing training and traveling in a spaceflight, as defined by NASA or the United States Department of Defense.
- Presented by: United States
- Status: Currently awarded

Army Precedence
- Next (higher): Army aviator badges
- Next (lower): Flight surgeon badge

United States astronaut badges are the various badges of the United States which are awarded to military and civilian personnel of the National Aeronautics and Space Administration, the various child departments of the Department of Defense, or a private space-faring entity, who have performed (or in some cases, completed training for) a spaceflight. The military versions are among the least-awarded qualification badges of the United States armed forces.

== History ==
The first astronaut badges were created by taking the astronauts' own aviator badges and overlaying the center shield with a design called the "astronaut device", a star with three trailing rays passing through an ellipse representing orbital flight.

In the 1960s, the United States Department of Defense awarded astronaut badges to military and civilian pilots who flew aircraft higher than 50 miles (80 kilometers). Seven USAF and NASA pilots qualified for the astronaut badge by flying the suborbital X-15 rocket spaceplane. American test pilots Michael Melvill and Brian Binnie were each awarded a commercial astronaut badge by the Federal Aviation Administration (FAA) when they flew sub-orbital missions aboard the Scaled Composites SpaceShipOne rocket spaceplane. All others who have been awarded the astronaut badge earned it travelling to space in non-winged rockets, the X-15, or the Space Shuttle. Three of the crew members aboard the Ax-1 flight aboard the Crew Dragon Capsule were awarded their civilian astronaut wings by their Mission commander upon becoming the first private citizens to travel to the International Space Station on April 9, 2022.

== Military badges ==
Each of the military services issues its own version of the astronaut badge, which consists of a standard aviation badge with an astronaut device (shooting star through a halo) centered on the badge's shield, or escutcheon. The United States Air Force and United States Army astronaut badges are issued in three degrees: Basic, senior, and command (Air Force)/master (Army). The senior astronaut badge is denoted by a star centered above the decoration, while the command/master level is indicated by a star and wreath.

=== Eligibility ===
To earn an astronaut badge, a U.S. Air Force or U.S. Navy and Marine Corps officer must complete all required training and participate in a space flight more than 50 miles (80 kilometers) above the Earth. The U.S. Army has awarded the badge to officers that have orbited the Earth.

=== U.S. Air Force astronauts ===
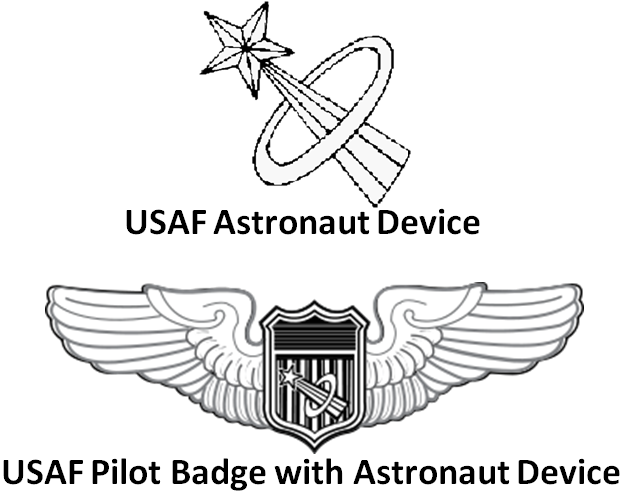

The U.S. Air Force Astronaut Badge consists of a standard USAF aeronautical badge, either Pilot or Combat Systems Officer (formerly known as Navigator) upon which is centered the astronaut device. The Air Force does not consider Astronaut to be a separate rating from its six established aeronautical rating badges, but as a "qualifier" to them, and may only be awarded by the Air Force Chief of Staff after written application upon completion of an operational space mission. The rating of Observer is used for USAF Mission Specialists who have completed training but not a mission and are not otherwise aeronautically rated as a USAF Pilot, RPA Pilot, Combat Systems Officer (formerly Navigator), Air Battle Manager, or Flight Surgeon. These USAF Observers wear wings that are identical to USAF Combat Systems Officers (formerly Navigators) although the Observers have never completed the associated USAF undergraduate flight training to qualify as a Combat Systems Officer or previously as a Navigator. Upon completion of a successful space flight, these Observers will add the "shooting star" logo to their wings, again, identical to those USAF astronauts who are fully qualified as Combat Systems Officers or previously qualified as Navigators.

In 2007, the U.S. Air Force announced the opening of astronaut mission specialists positions to enlisted personnel who met certain eligibility requirements. These requirements include:

- Be on active duty in the U.S. Air Force
- Be a United States citizen
- Have a minimum of a bachelor's degree in either engineering, mathematics, biological science, or physical science, with 3 years experience
- Have a current Class II Flight Physical
- Be between 62 and 75 inches tall

No enlisted astronaut badges are yet known to have been issued.

US Air Force Astronaut Badges
Basic	Senior	Master
US Air Force Astronaut Observer / Navigator / Combat System Officer Badges
Basic	Senior	Master
US Air Force Astronaut Flight Surgeon Badges
Basic	Senior	Chief

=== U.S. Army astronauts ===
The gold astronaut device is issued by the U.S. Army to Army aviators, flight surgeons, and aircrew members that qualify as astronauts. Army astronauts that have yet to fly a mission and have not previously been awarded any aviation badge are awarded the army aviation badge. Once they have flown a mission, they are awarded the astronaut device, which is affixed to the shield of their army aviation badge. The army astronaut device was approved on May 17, 1983. The black version of the device and its sew-on equivalent may be worn on the Army Combat Uniform (ACU); the silver wings with gold device version is authorized for wear on Army Service Uniforms. It is believed to be the rarest badge issued by the U.S. Army.

US Army Aviator Astronaut Badges
Basic	Senior	Master

=== U.S. Navy, U.S. Marine Corps, and U.S. Coast Guard astronauts ===
The Naval Astronaut insignias are issued in a single degree to Naval Aviators and Naval Flight Officers from the United States Navy, United States Marine Corps, and United States Coast Guard, with officers of all three branches receiving their designations as Naval Aviators or Naval Flight Officers through the naval aviation flight training program that the U.S. Navy administers for all three service branches. All three branches also wear the same insignia which consists of naval aviator insignia or naval flight officer insignia with a centered gold astronaut device. However, the Coast Guard only issues the Naval Flight Officer version of the astronaut insignia to its astronauts, even though all their astronauts to date have been qualified Naval Aviators. The reason(s) for this disparity have never been clearly articulated but it may stem from the fact that all USCG astronauts to date have flown as Mission Specialists and not as spacecraft pilots. However, USN and USMC Naval Aviators who fly as Mission Specialists are awarded and will wear the Naval Aviator Astronaut insignia. USCG astronauts wear both their Naval Aviator wings and their Coast Guard Astronaut wings on their uniforms.

US Navy, Marine Corps, and Coast Guard Aviator Astronaut Badges
US Navy & Marine Astronaut	US Navy & Marine Flight Officer Astronaut / Coast Guard Astronaut

=== U.S. Space Force astronauts ===
As of 2025, two USSF officers have qualified as military astronauts. Both were originally commissioned as USAF officers. Neither one attended USAF flight training to become a Pilot or what was then known as Navigator, now known as Combat Systems Officer, and instead served as technical flight test engineers. Both currently wear the USAF Senior Observer Astronaut insignia identical to the Senior USAF Combat Systems Officer Astronaut insignia.

== NASA badges ==
=== Civilian astronaut badge ===
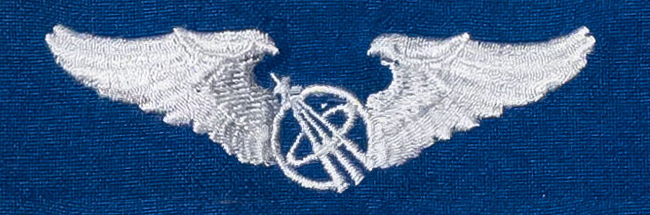
NASA Civilian Astronaut Wings

NASA issues a badge to all civilian personnel working as career astronauts on spaceflight missions who are not otherwise Active Duty, Reserve or National Guard, or Retired aeronautically rated (USAF/USA) or aeronautically designated (USN/USMC/USCG) personnel.

The badge is embroidered in silver, and may optionally be embroidered in gold for astronauts who have flown to space. They feature the same astronaut device between the wings as seen on the military versions. It is worn on flight suits and flight jackets.

=== Space Shuttle payload specialist badges ===
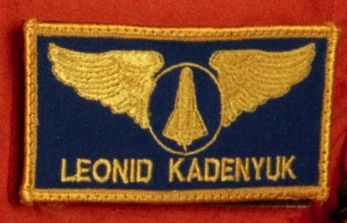
The payload specialist badge of Ukrainian astronaut Leonid Kadenyuk

A unique badge was created for individuals serving as payload specialists on NASA Space Shuttle missions. Payload specialists were selected by a variety of organizations and included:

- individuals selected by the research community, a company or consortium flying a commercial payload aboard the spacecraft
- non-NASA astronauts selected by partner nations
- U.S. legislative branch representatives

The payload specialist badge featured a silhouette of the Space Shuttle in place of the astronaut device.

== NASA astronaut pins ==
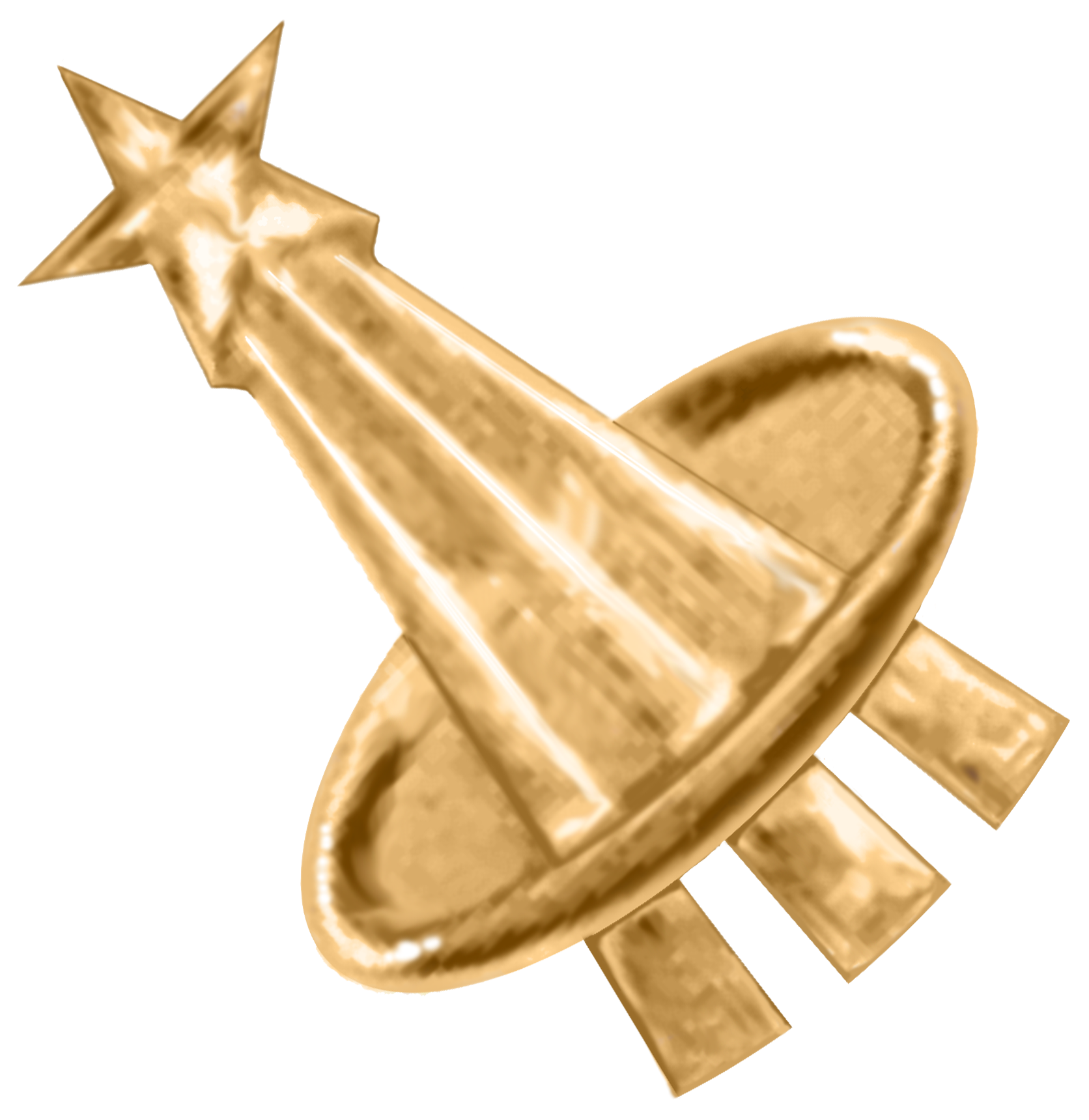
Gold Grade Astronaut Pin

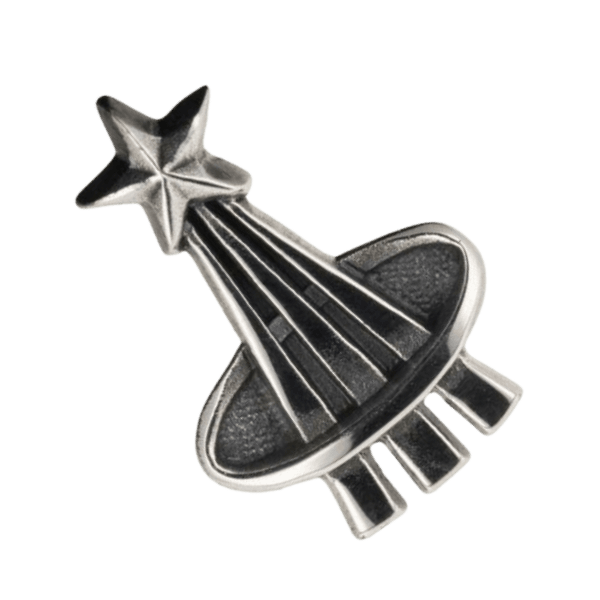
Silver Astronaut Candidate Pin

In addition to the astronaut badge, which is worn on a military uniform or NASA jumpsuit, astronauts also earn a pin to wear on civilian clothing, signifying their eligibility to take part in missions to space. These include flights to the International Space Station, and Artemis missions to the moon.

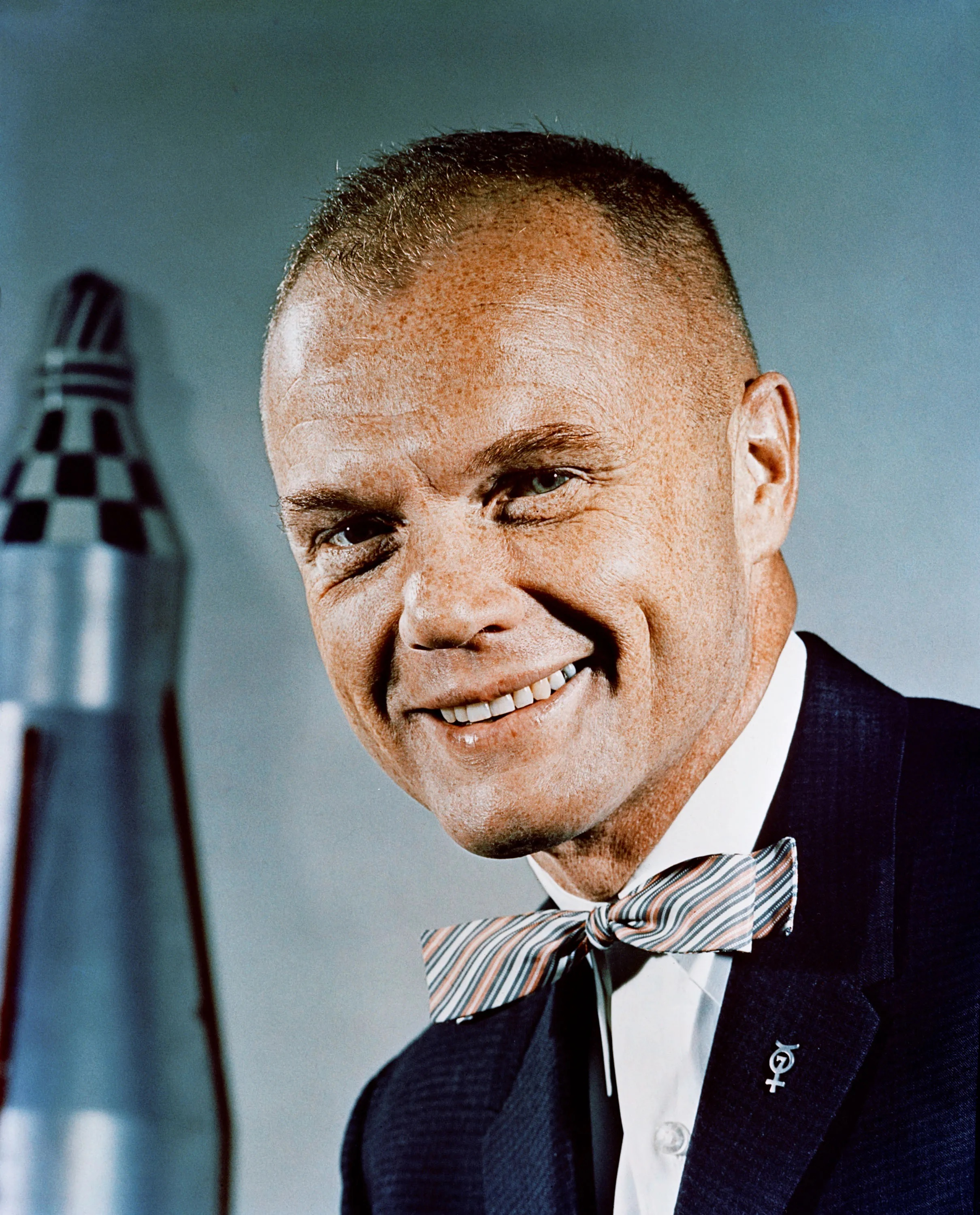
John Glenn in 1960, wearing his Mercury astronaut pin

The first astronaut pin was created for the Mercury Seven astronauts, in the form of the symbol for the planet Mercury overlaid with the Arabic number "7." As the space program expanded, NASA realized it needed a new symbol to cover personnel on all missions, and created a new lapel pin isolating the "astronaut device" previously applied to flight wings.

The pin is issued in two grades, silver and gold, with the silver pin awarded to candidates who have successfully completed astronaut training and the gold pin to astronauts who have flown in space. Astronaut candidates are given the silver pin but are required to purchase the gold pin at a cost of approximately $400. The Mercury astronauts were the first to receive the pins.

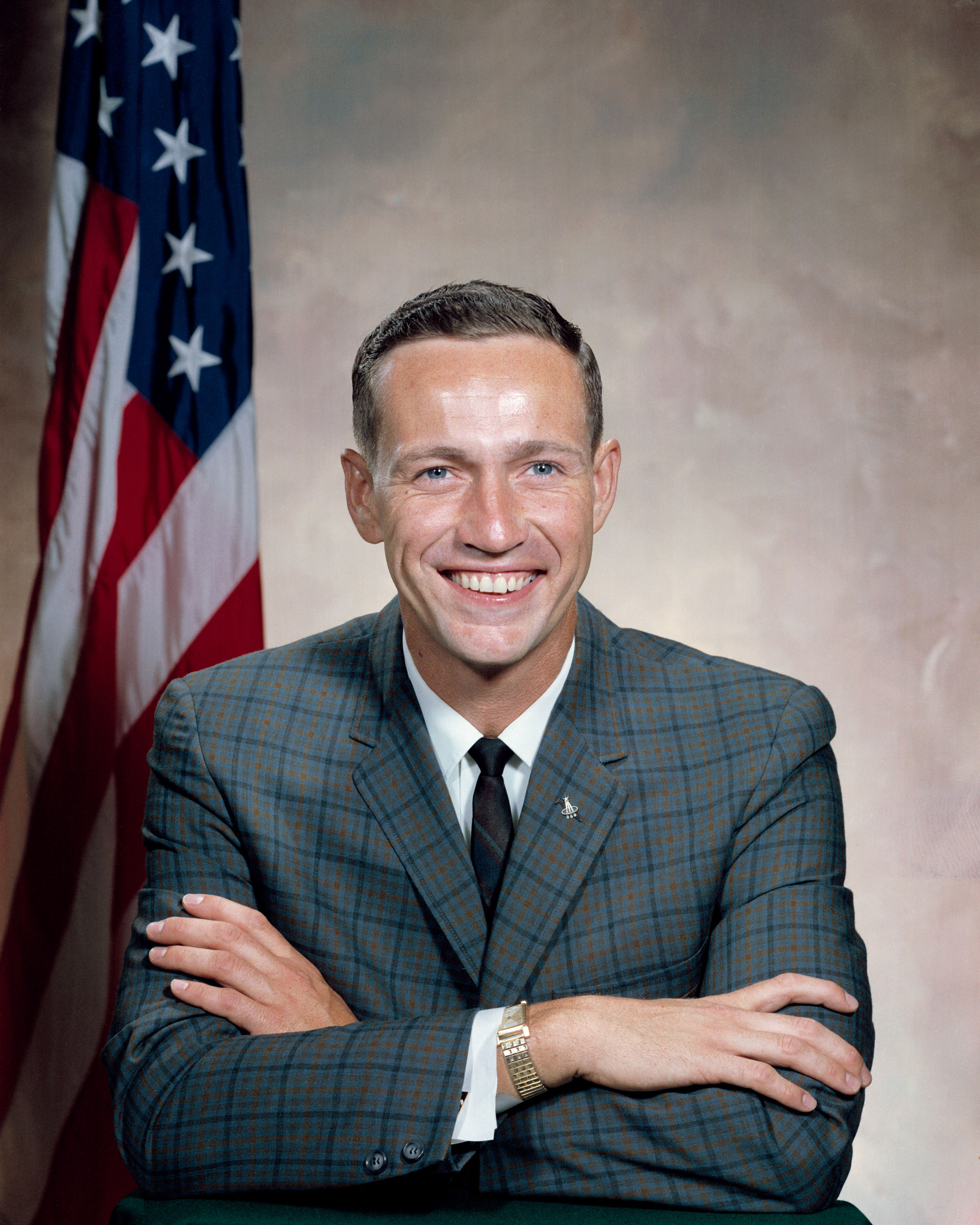
Astronaut Donn F. Eisele wearing a silver qualification pin before his Apollo 7 mission

A unique astronaut pin was made for NASA astronaut Deke Slayton in 1967. It was gold in color, like the ones given to astronauts who had flown, and it had a small diamond in place of the star. It was made at the request of the crew of the first crewed mission of the Apollo program as a tribute to Slayton's work at NASA. At the time it was thought that Slayton would never get to space himself, due to a heart condition. Believing that Slayton would refuse to wear exactly the same gold pin as veteran astronauts, the diamond was added. The pin was supposed to have been flown on board the Apollo 1 spacecraft, then given to Slayton after the mission was over. However, the Apollo 1 crew died in a fire during a training exercise on January 27, 1967 and the pin was presented to Slayton by the three widows of the dead crew. This diamond-studded gold pin was later flown to the Moon on board Apollo 11 in July 1969. Slayton would go on to earn a gold pin in 1975 as a docking module pilot on the Apollo-Soyuz Test Project.

A second unique pin was made for Nick Hague after he became the first NASA astronaut to experience an in-flight launch abort. On October 11, 2018, the Soyuz MS-10 mission, part of Expedition 57 to the International Space Station, aborted after one of the four boosters failed to separate properly from the first stage core. The abort happened late enough in the launch sequence that the Soyuz capsule coasted to an apogee of 93 km (58 mi) after separating from the disintegrating rocket. This was above the U.S. definition of the boundary of space at 50 miles (80 km) but below the FAI definition of 100 km (62 mi). In commemoration of his aborted flight, he was given a pin made of roughly-cast tin. He would later receive a gold pin after his successful mission as part of Expedition 59/60.

One silver astronaut pin currently rests on the surface of the Moon, the one that belonged to Clifton Williams, left there by astronaut Alan Bean during Apollo 12 in 1969. Williams was originally scheduled to fly to the Moon as Lunar Module Pilot on Apollo 12 but was killed in a plane crash before he was officially assigned to the flight. Bean was his replacement.

== FAA Commercial Space Astronaut Wings ==
From 2004 through 2021 the U.S. Federal Aviation Administration created a program to encourage and recognize commercial astronauts, giving special wings to pilots and flight crew on all FAA-licensed commercial flight that exceeded 50 miles above the surface of the Earth. The FAA Commercial Astronaut Wings design was changed in 2018, and the program opened up to all passengers on such flights.

The program was discontinued in 2021, with the rise of commercial space tourism. In total, 30 people were awarded Commercial Space Astronaut Wings.

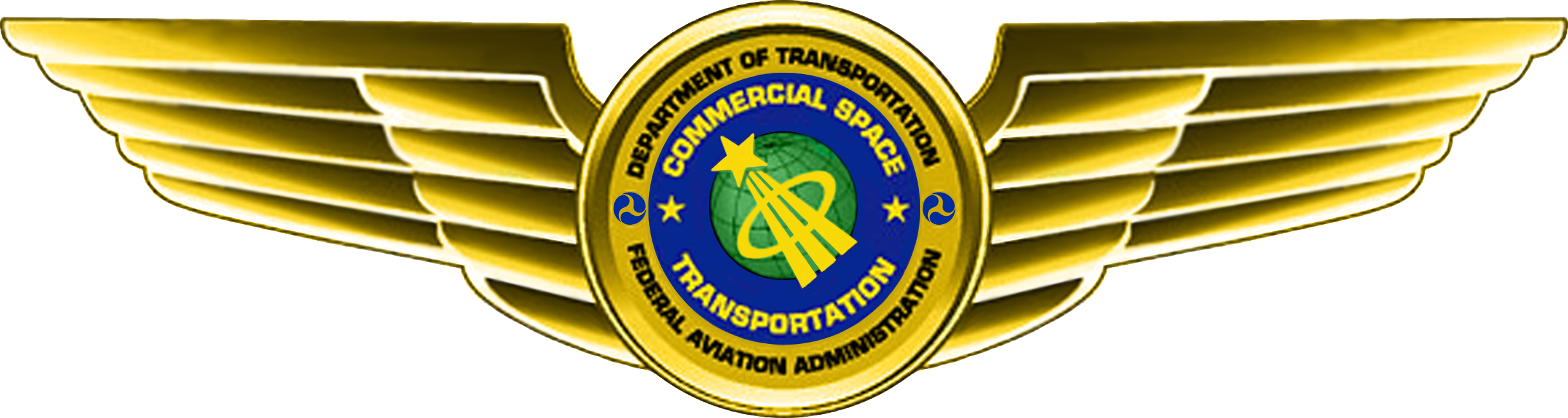

FAA Commercial Astronaut Wings (2004)

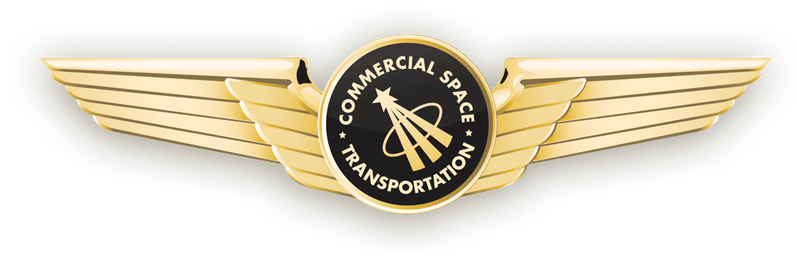

FAA Commercial Astronaut Wings (2018–2021)

== See also ==
- United States aircrew badges
- United States aviator badges
- United States balloon pilot badges
- United States diver badges
- United States recruiter awards
- Military badges of the United States
- Badges of the United States Air Force
- Badges of the United States Army
- Badges of the United States Coast Guard
- Badges of the United States Marine Corps
- Badges of the United States Navy
- Human spaceflight
- Mission patch
- Edge of space
- Pilot-Cosmonaut of the Russian Federation
