= Military badges of the United States =

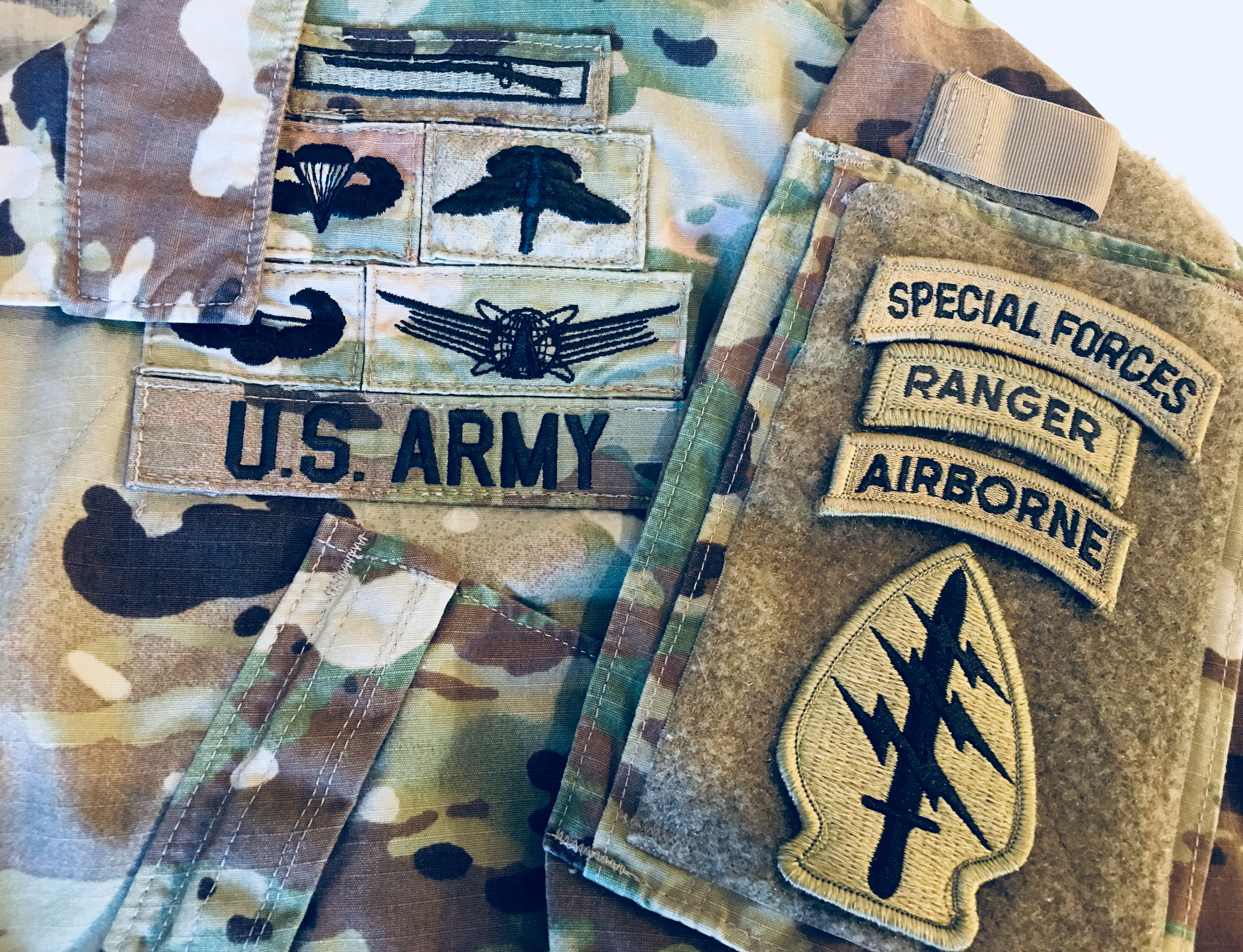
Example of U.S. Army badges on the Operational Camouflage Pattern uniform (worn above the U.S. Army nametape)

Military badges of the United States are awards authorized by the United States Armed Forces that signify rating, qualification, or accomplishment in several career fields, and also serve as identification devices for personnel occupying certain assignments. Personal recognition is granted to service members by a number of awards and decorations. Together with military decorations, such badges are authorized for wear on military uniforms.

Each of the six military services maintains a separate series of badges that may be awarded to service members, although some badges may be shared between branches. An example of the latter is the Basic Parachutist Badge, which is authorized for wear by all six services. Each service determines how badges are displayed, how many may be worn at one time, and whether badges awarded by other branches may be worn on the uniform. Properly earned foreign badges may also be worn, depending on the branch of service, awarding nation, and type of badge.

== General categories ==
Badges may be classified by United States Armed Forces branch:

- Badges of the United States Army
- Badges of the United States Marine Corps
- Badges of the United States Navy
- Badges of the United States Air Force
- Badges of the United States Space Force
- Badges of the United States Coast Guard

Badges are also issued by the two non-armed force uniformed services:

- Badges of the National Oceanic and Atmospheric Administration Commissioned Officer Corps
- Badges of the Public Health Service Commissioned Corps

There are additional classification schemes, including:

- United States aircrew badges
- United States astronaut badges
- United States aviator badges
- United States balloon pilot badges
- United States diver badges
- United States recruiter badges

Additionally, there are "identification badges," which represent a particular billet or assignment, rather than a specific qualification:

- Identification badges of the uniformed services of the United States

== U.S Auxiliary military badges ==
There are also United States auxiliary military badges:

- Badges of the Civil Air Patrol
- Badges of the Coast Guard Auxiliary

Auxiliary badges are reserved for members of the United States Coast Guard Auxiliary or the Civil Air Patrol, as the auxiliary of the United States Air Force. The Coast Guard Auxiliary, originally known as the Coast Guard Reserve, was founded in 1939 by the Congress. It enlisted the aid of "unpaid, volunteer U.S. citizens who owned motorboats or yachts." Its purpose is to keep safe the seas and waters of the United States, offer general aid to the entirety of the Coast Guard, and ensure the efficiency of the technology used on the seas and waters of the United States. The Civil Air Patrol was involved with United States Civil Defense operations throughout World War II. On 26 May 1948, Public Law 80-557 was enacted and CAP became the official auxiliary to the United States Air Force.

== Obsolete badges ==
In addition to those badges currently authorized, there are a number of obsolete badges that have been phased out of the U.S. armed forces and no longer appear on U.S. award precedence charts.
