= Identification badges of the uniformed services of the United States =

List of identification badges of the US Uniformed Services

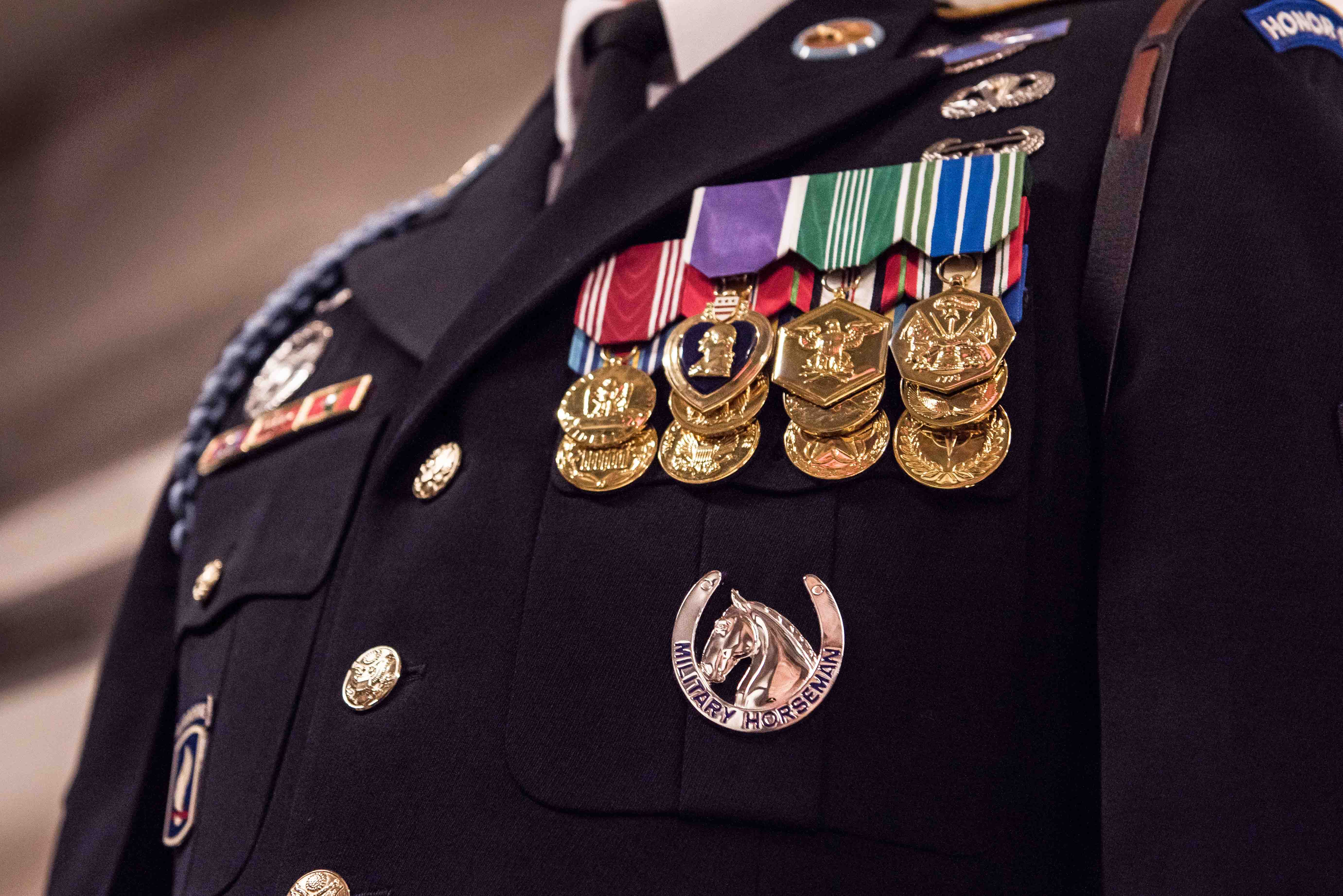
In 2017, during a special ceremony at Joint Base Myer–Henderson Hall, this soldier from the 3rd Infantry Regiment was among the first to be awarded one of the U.S. Army's rarest badges, the Military Horseman Identification Badge.

Identification badges of the uniformed services of the United States are insignia worn by service members conducting special duties, many of which can be awarded as permanent decorations if those duties are performed successfully. There are a few identification badges that are awarded to all services (such as the Presidential Service Badge), others are specific to a uniform service (such as the U.S. Army's Drill Sergeant Identification Badge). The Office of the President and Vice President and department/service headquarters badges are permanent decorations for those who successfully serve in those assignments. Some of the service level identification badges can be permanent decorations and others are only worn by a service member while performing specific duties, such as the Military Police Badge.

Command insignia/badges are another form of identification badge used to identify an officer or non-commissioned officer who is/was in command or in-charge of a unit. If the service member performs their leadership duties successfully, the command insignia/badge they wear can become a permanent uniform decoration regardless of their next assignment.

The following is a list of identification badges currently in use by the uniformed services:

== Executive branch ==
Presidential Service Badge

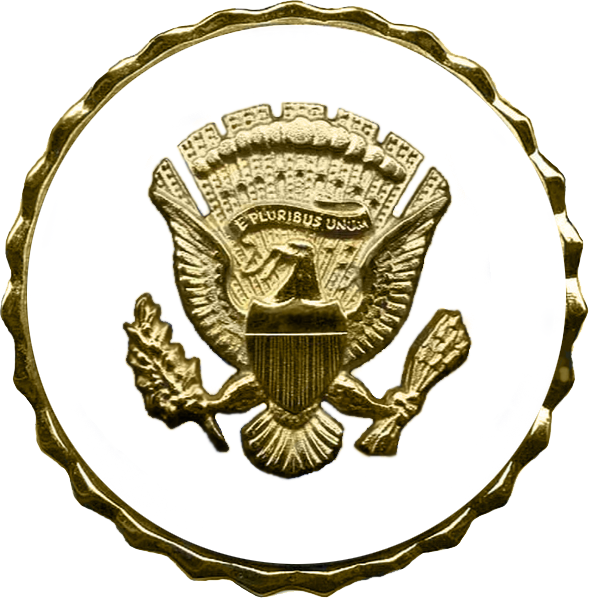
Vice Presidential Service Badge

== Department of Defense ==
Office of the Secretary of Defense Identification Badge

Office of the Joint Chiefs of Staff Identification Badge

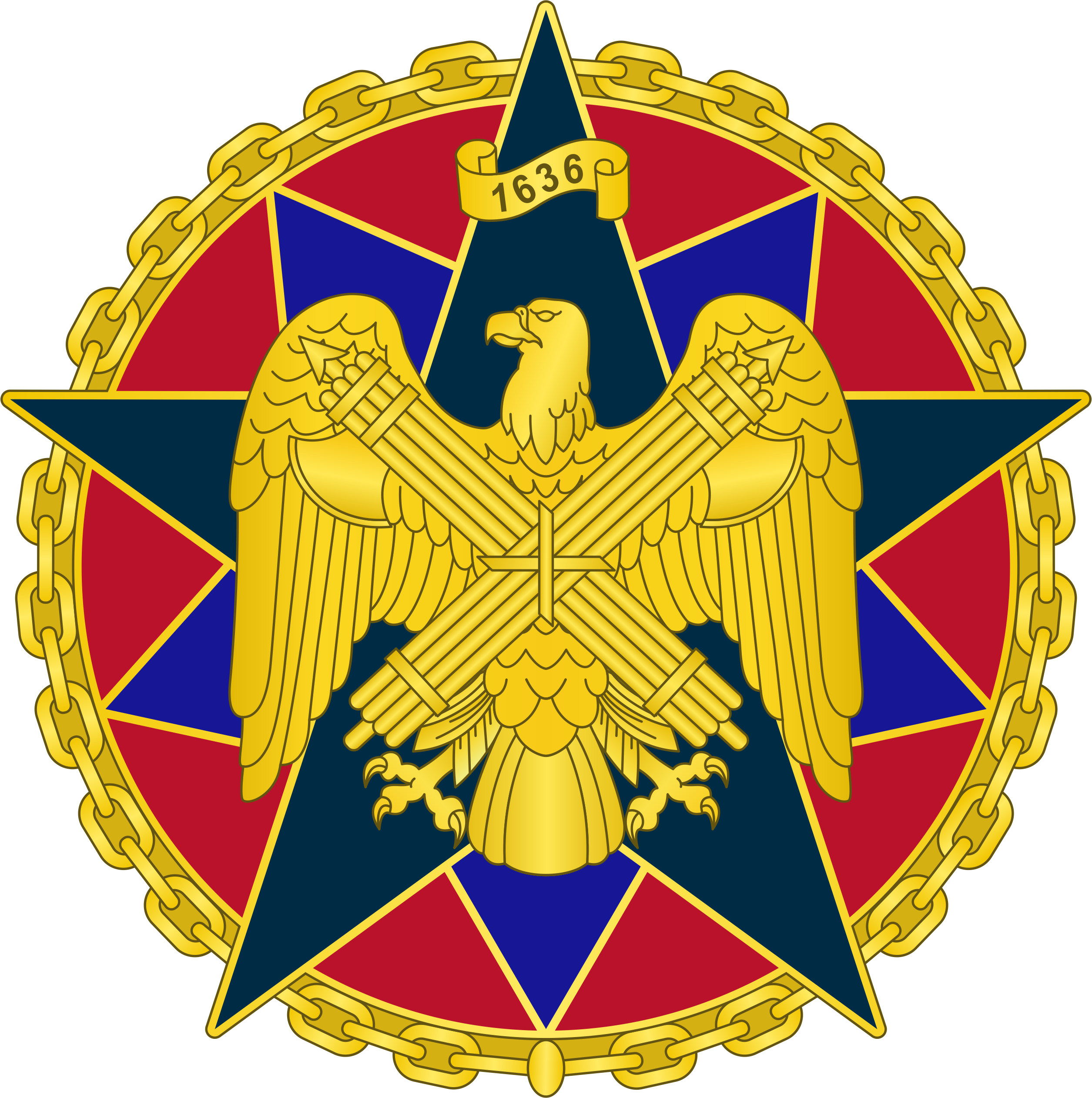
National Guard Bureau Organizational Badge

=== U.S. Army ===
Army Staff Identification Badge

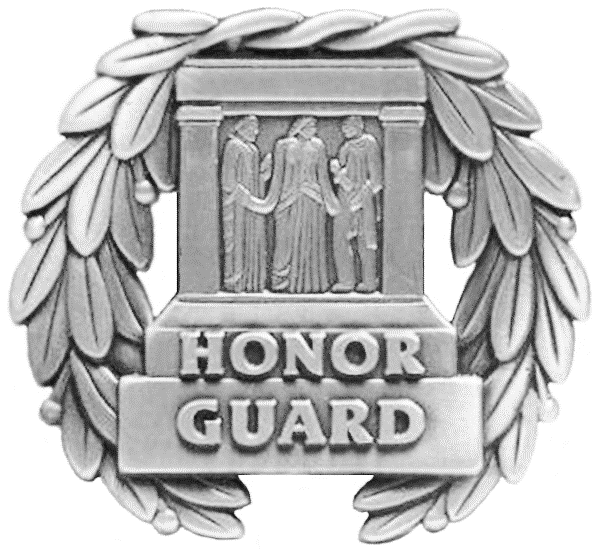
Guard, Tomb of the Unknown Soldier Identification Badge

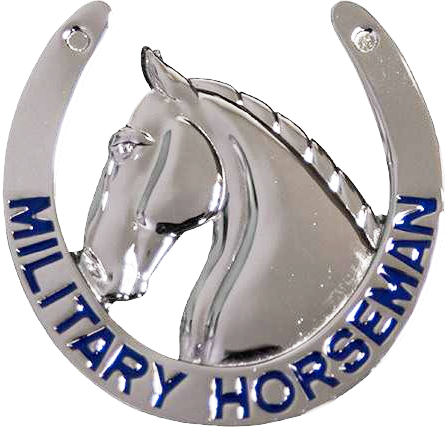
Military Horseman Identification Badge

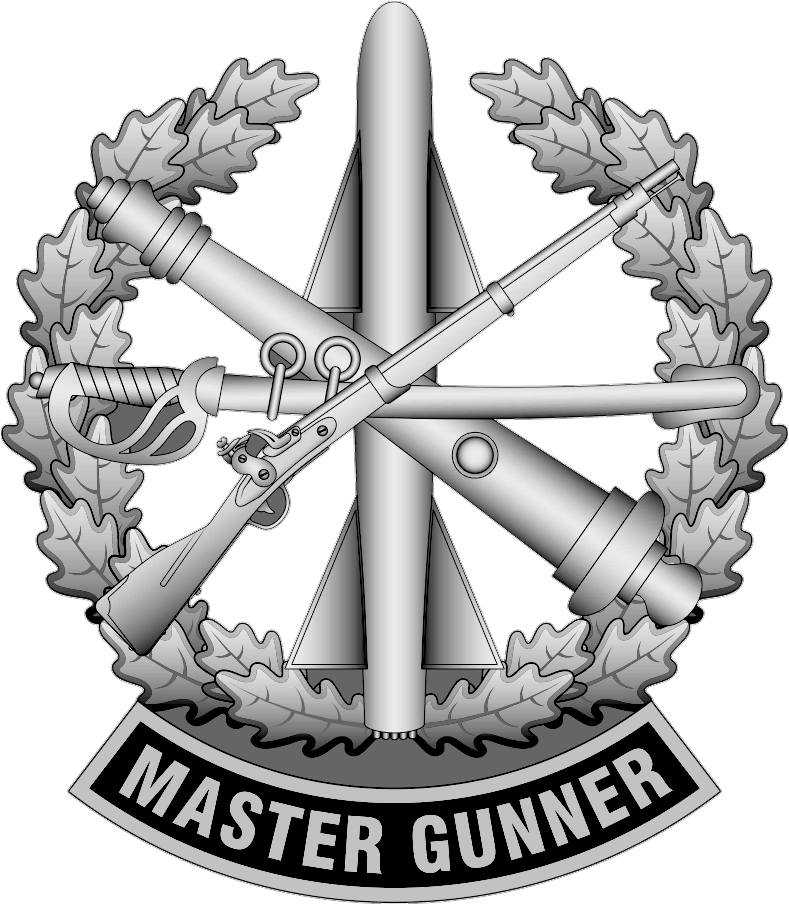
Master Gunner Identification Badge

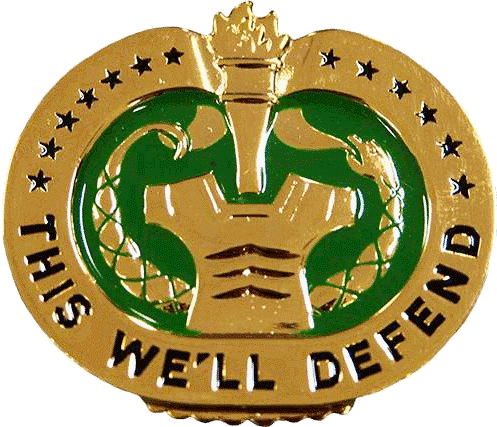
Drill Sergeant Identification Badge

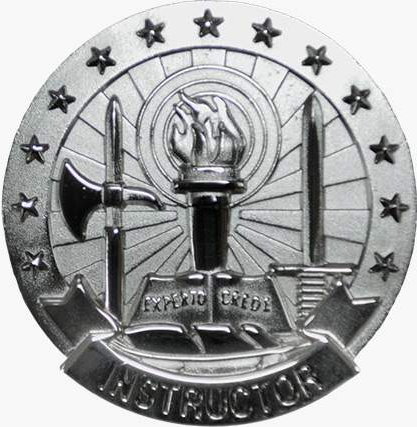
Instructor Identification Badges

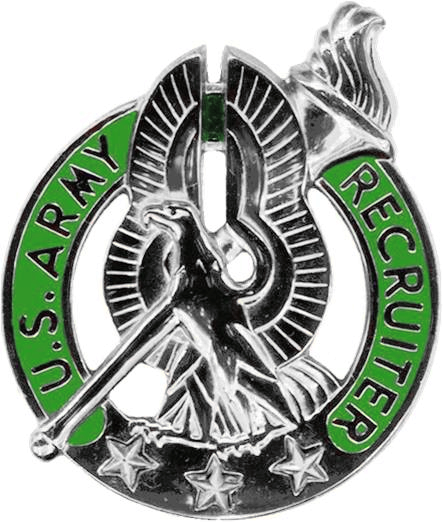
Recruiter Badges

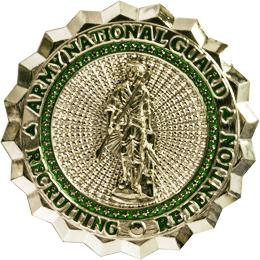
National Guard Recruiter & Retention Badges

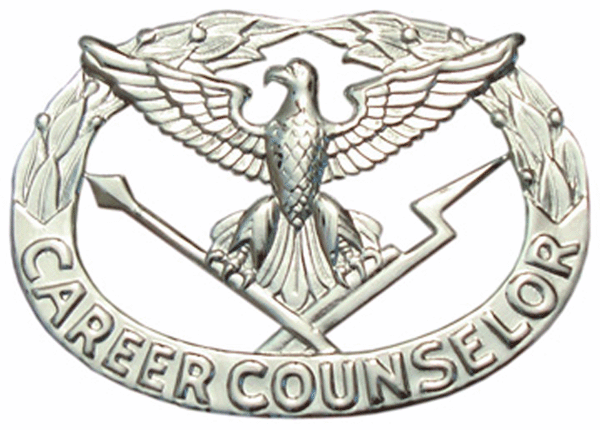
Career Counselor Badge

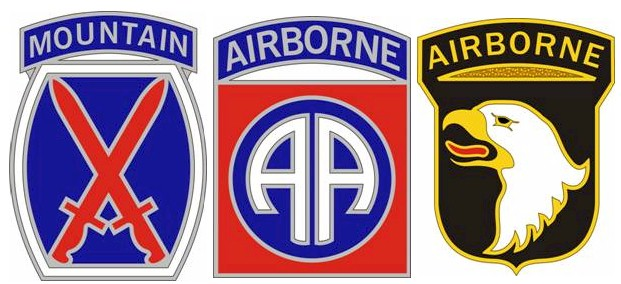
Combat Service Identification Badges

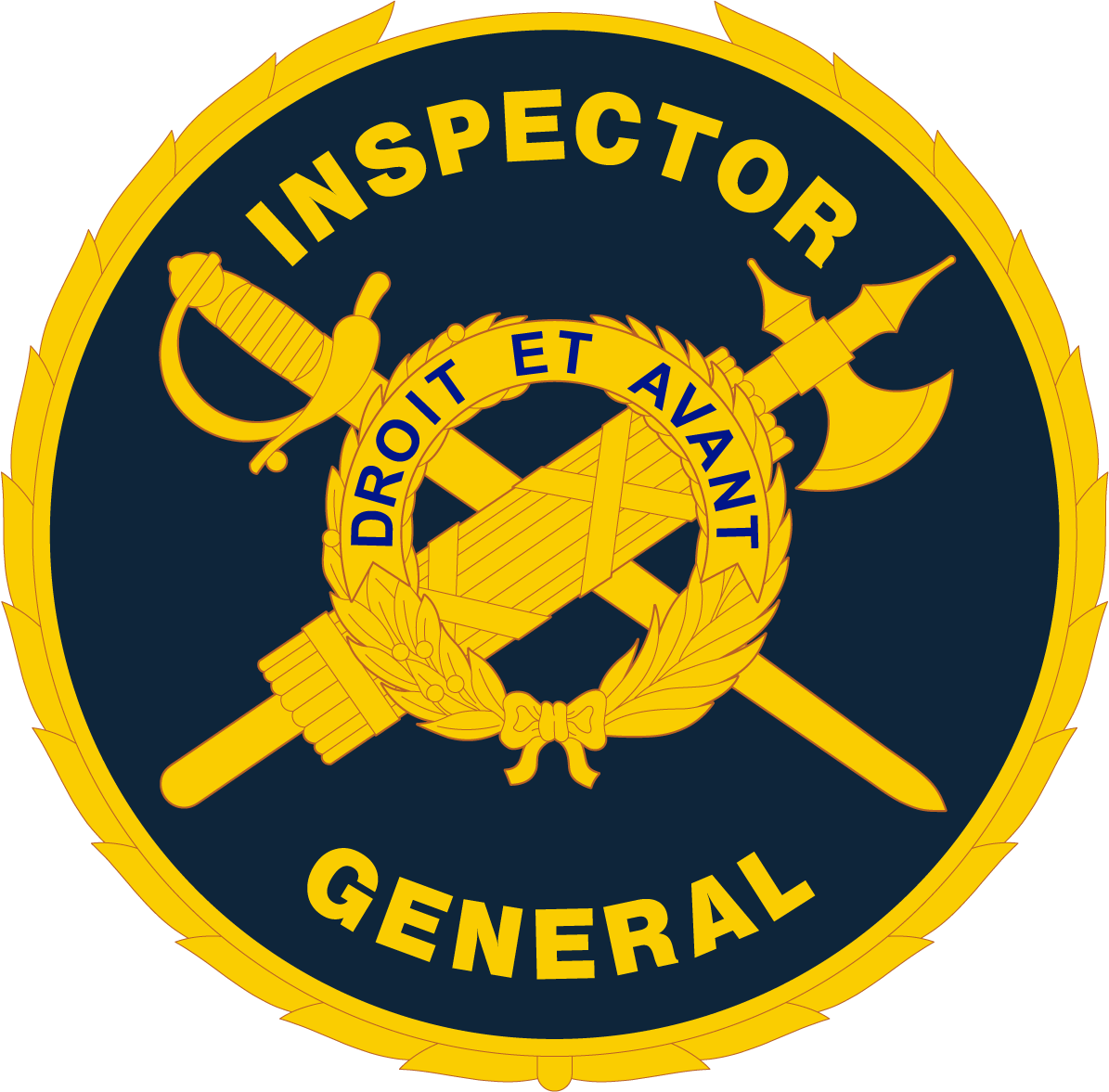
Inspector General Identification Badge

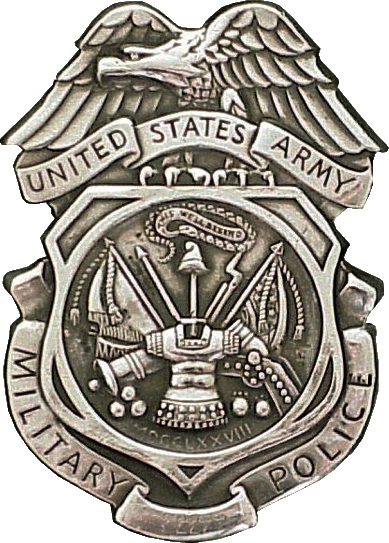
Military Police Identification Badge

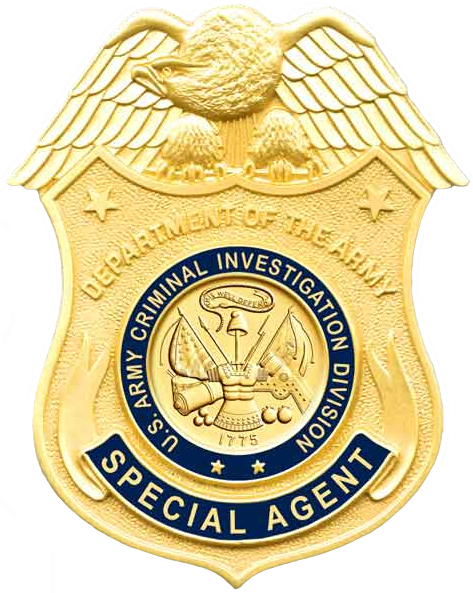
Criminal Investigation Division Special Agent Badge

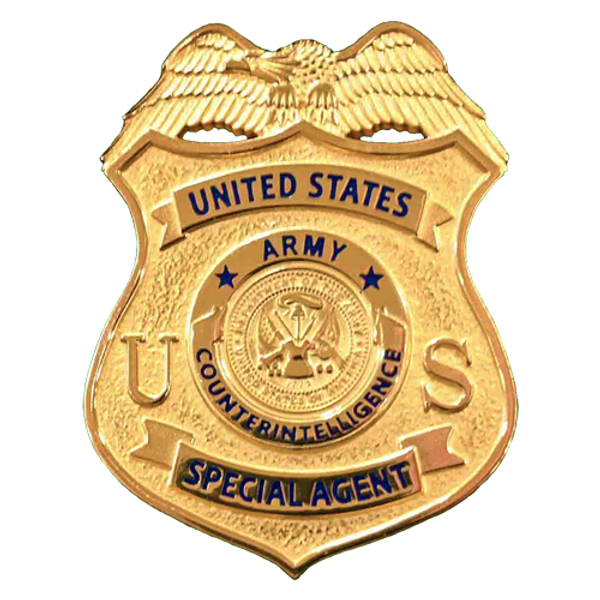
Army Counterintelligence Special Agent Badge

=== U.S. Marine Corps ===
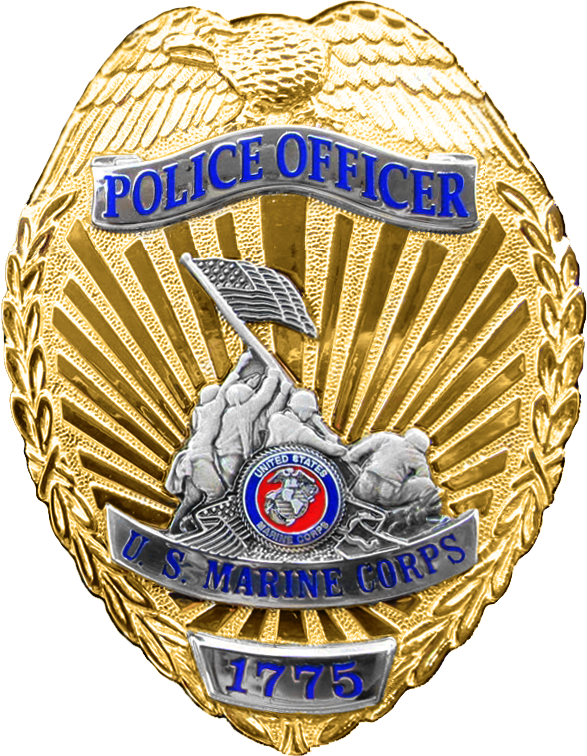
Military Police Badge

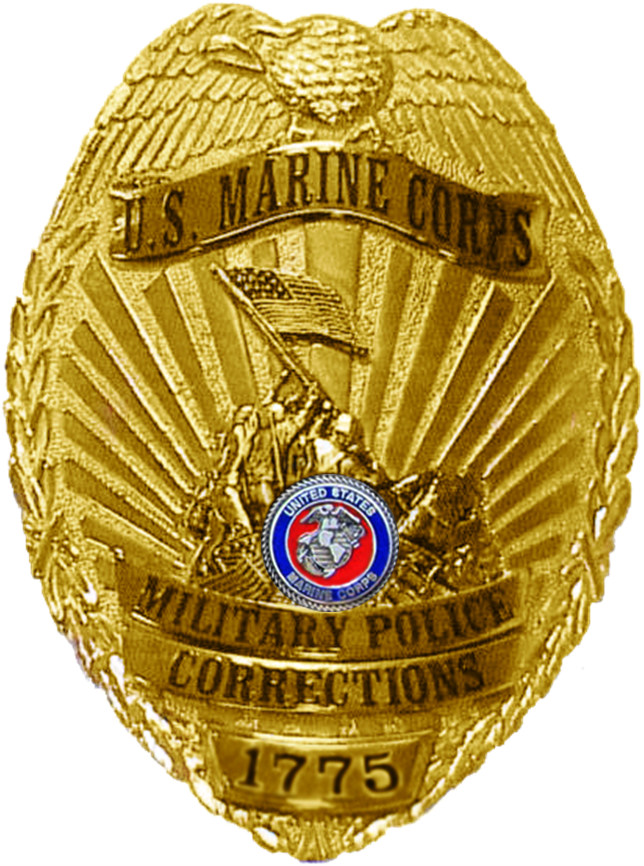
Military Police Corrections Badge

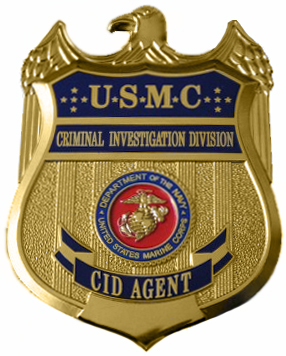
Criminal Investigation Division Agent Badge

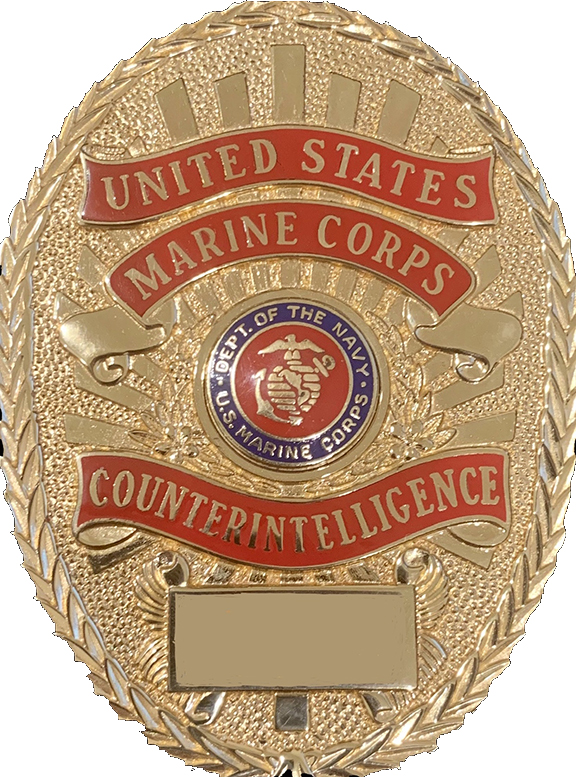
Marine Corps Counterintelligence Agent Badge

=== U.S. Navy ===
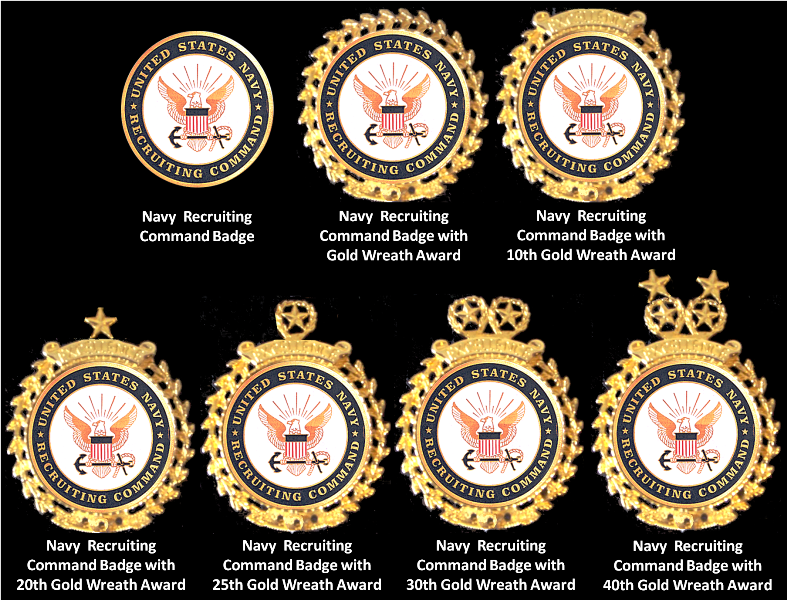
Recruiting Command Badges

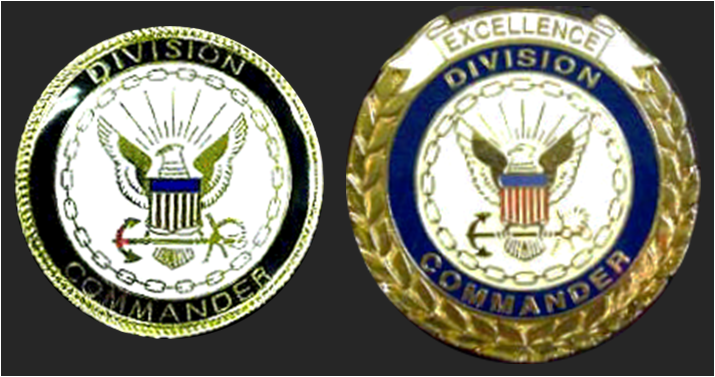
Recruit Division Commander Badges

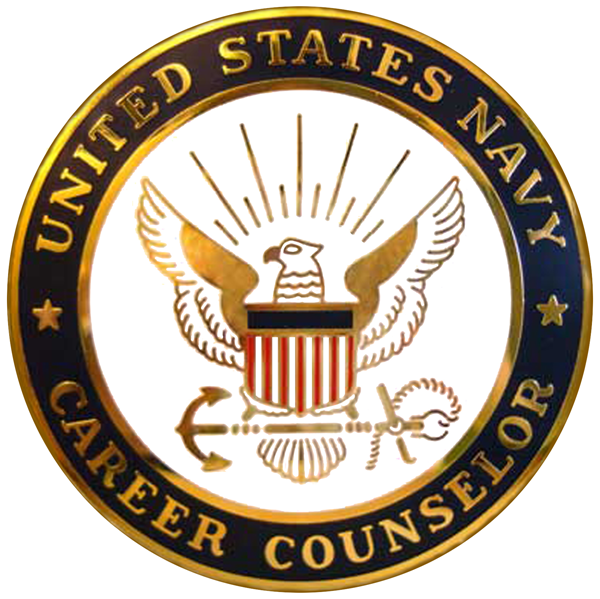
Career Counselor Badge

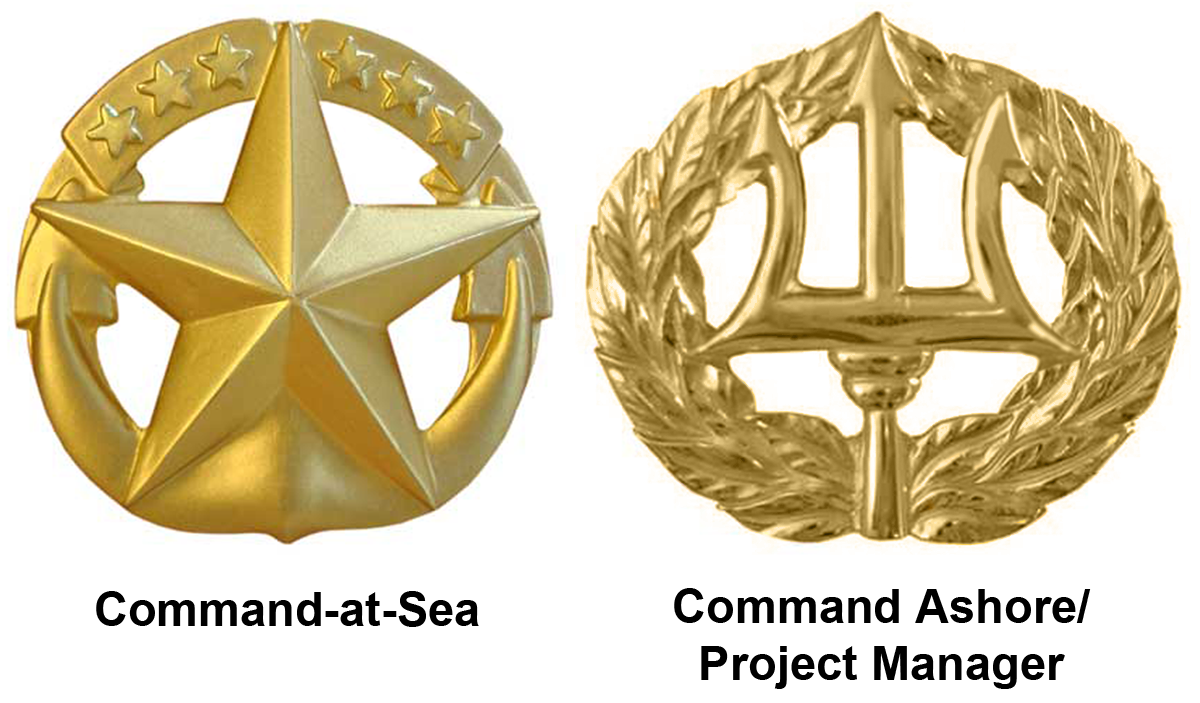
Command at Sea and Command Ashore/Project Manager Insignia

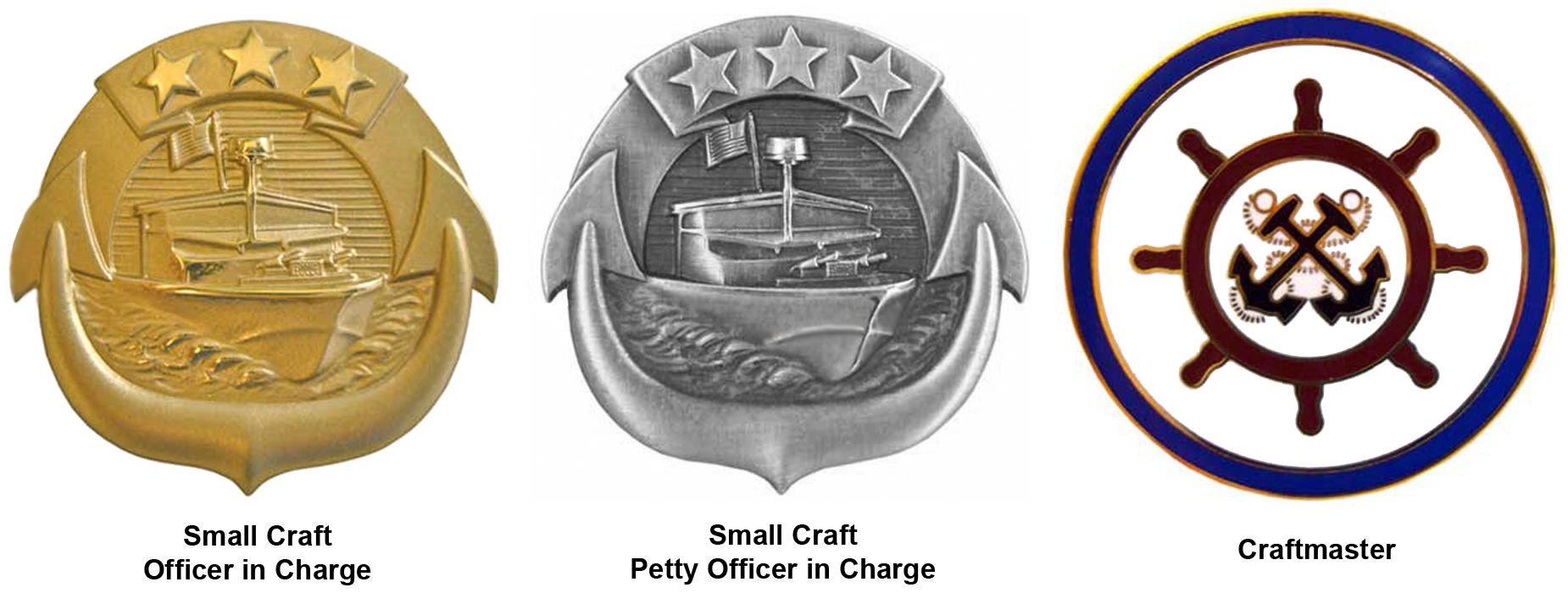
Small Craft Officer/Petty Officer in Charge Insignia

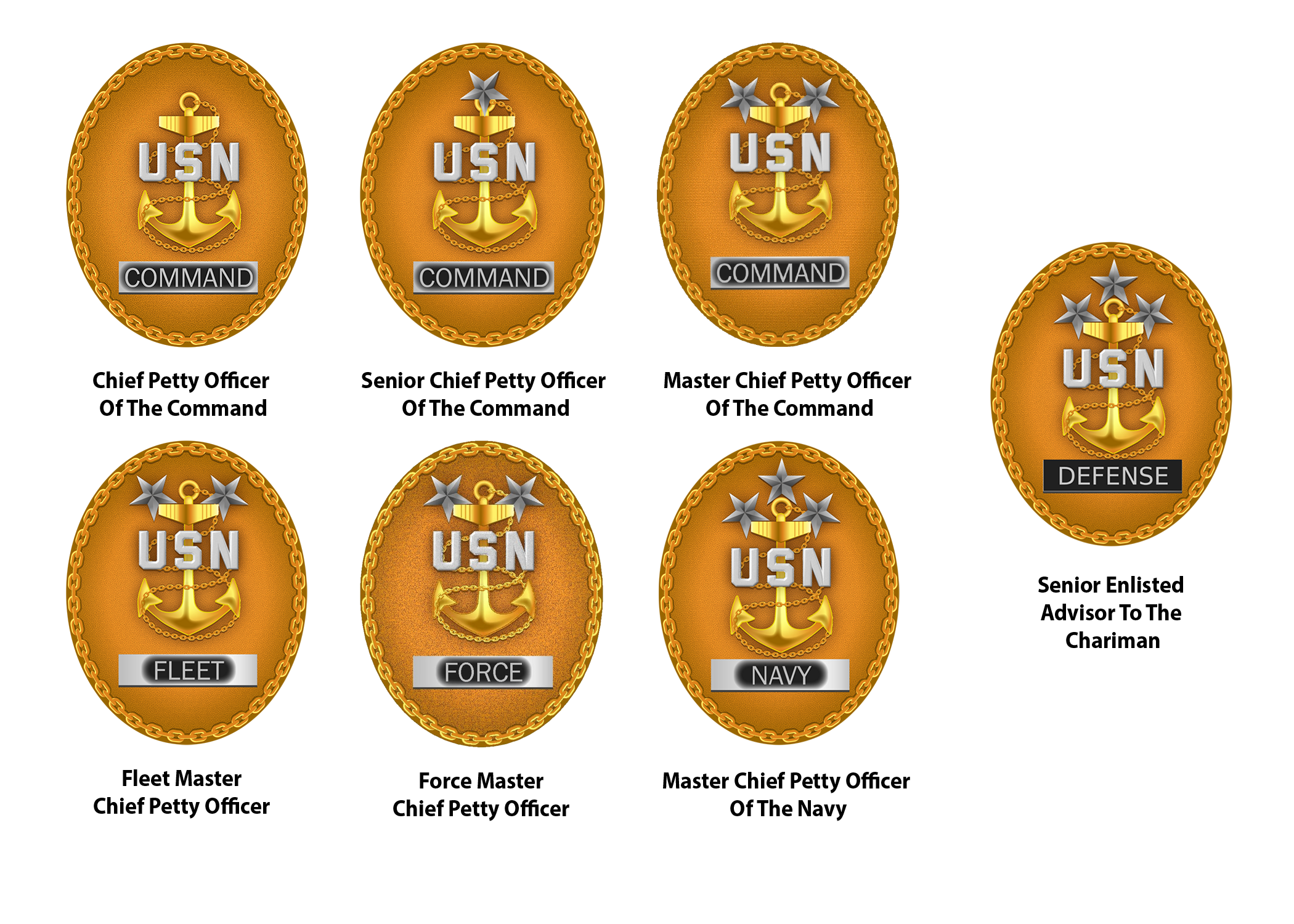
Command Senior Enlisted Leader Identification Badges

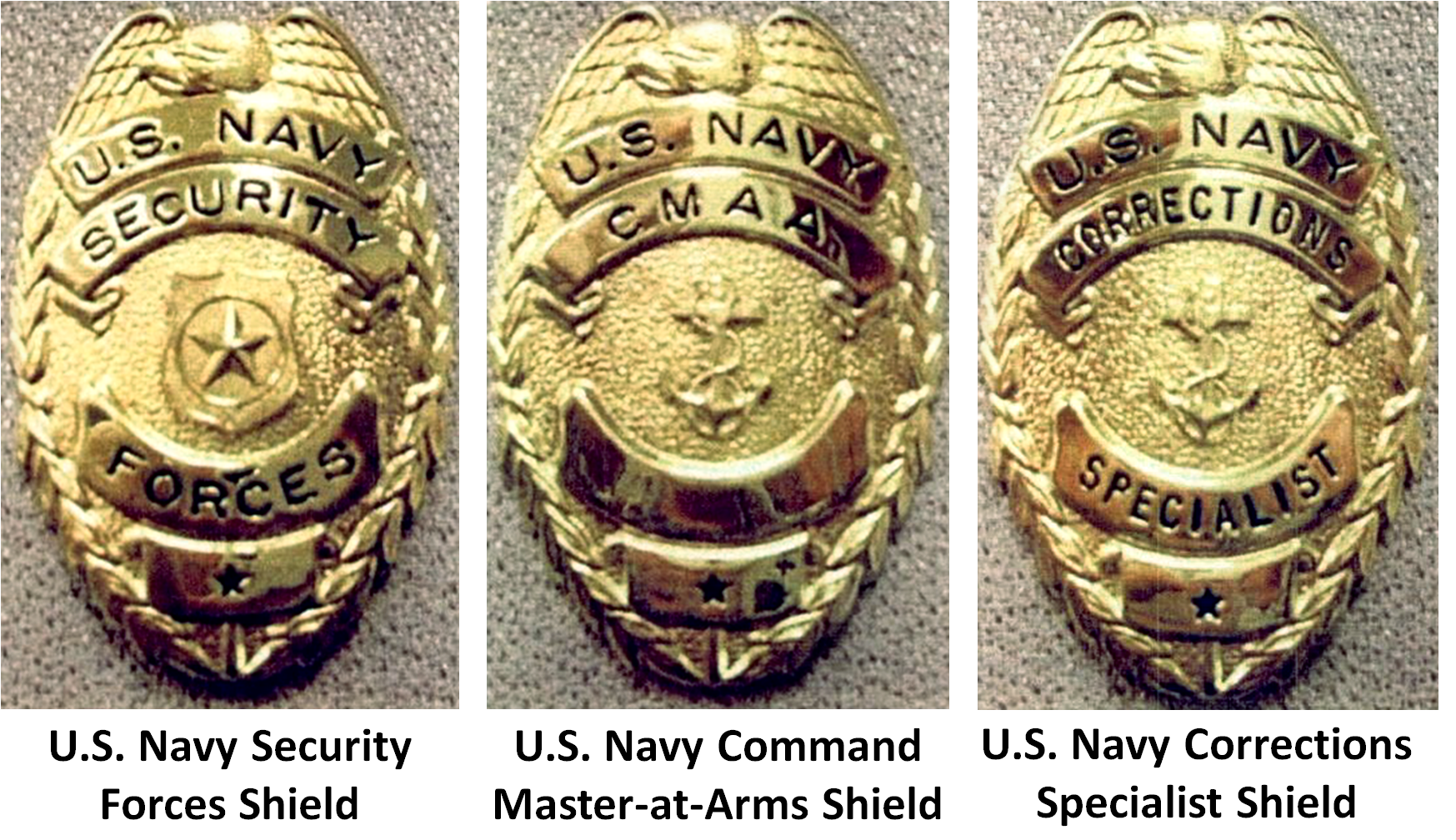
Law Enforcement Badges

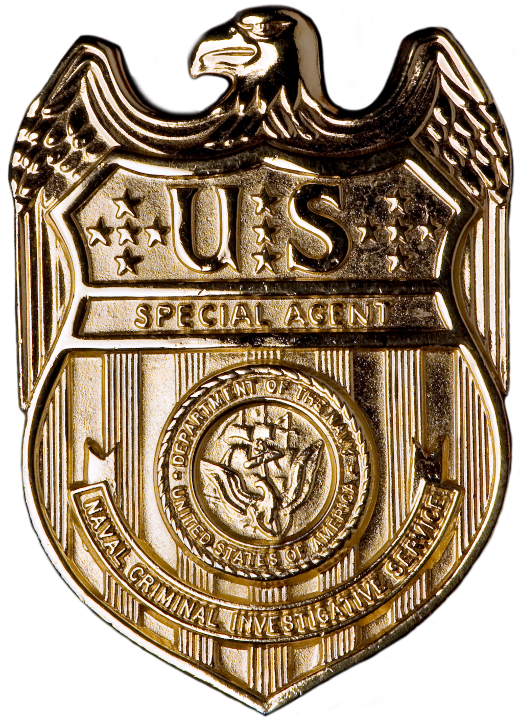
Naval Criminal Investigative Service Badge

=== U.S. Air Force ===
Headquarters Air Force Badge

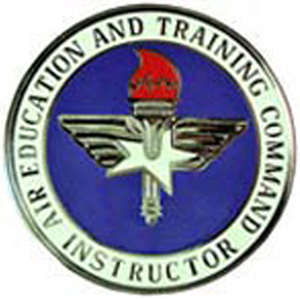
Air Education and Training Command Instructor Badges

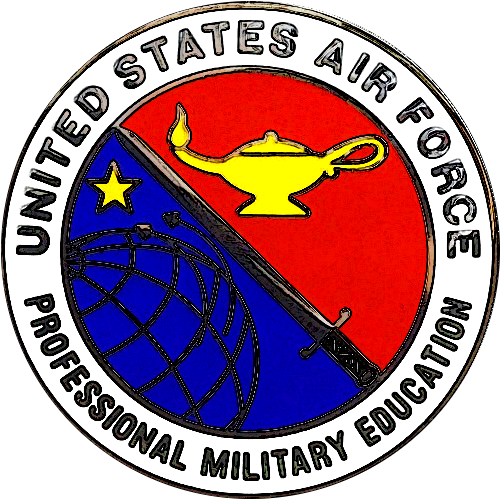
Professional Military Education Badge

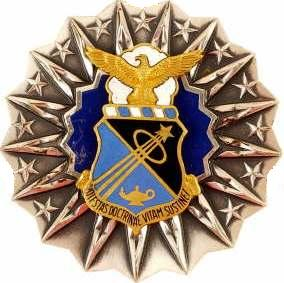
Permanent Professor Air Force Academy Badge

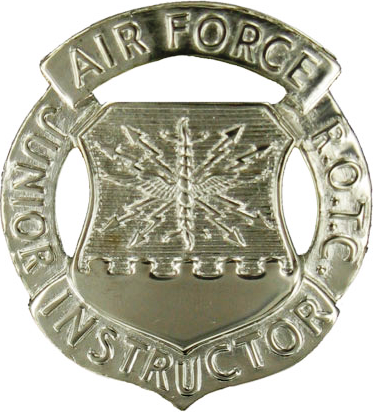
Junior Reserve Officers' Training Corps Instructor Badge

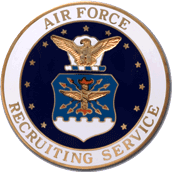
Recruiting Service Badges

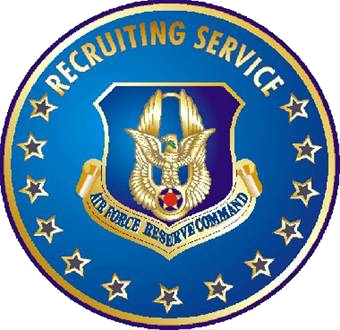
Reserve Command Recruiting Service Badges

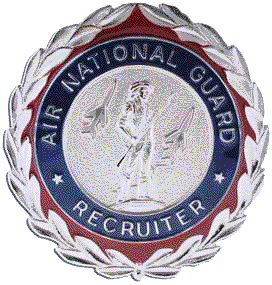
Air National Guard Recruiter Badges

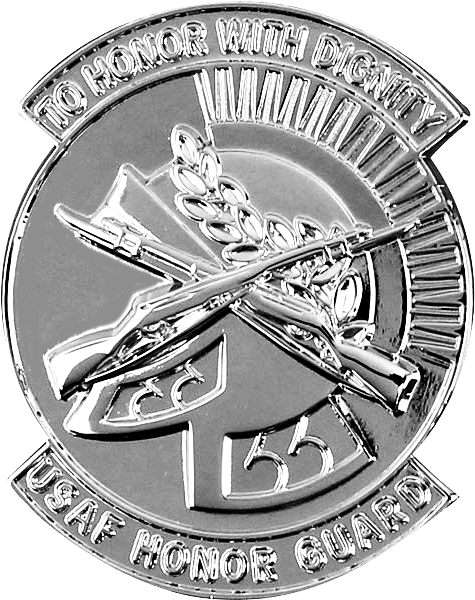
Honor Guard Badge

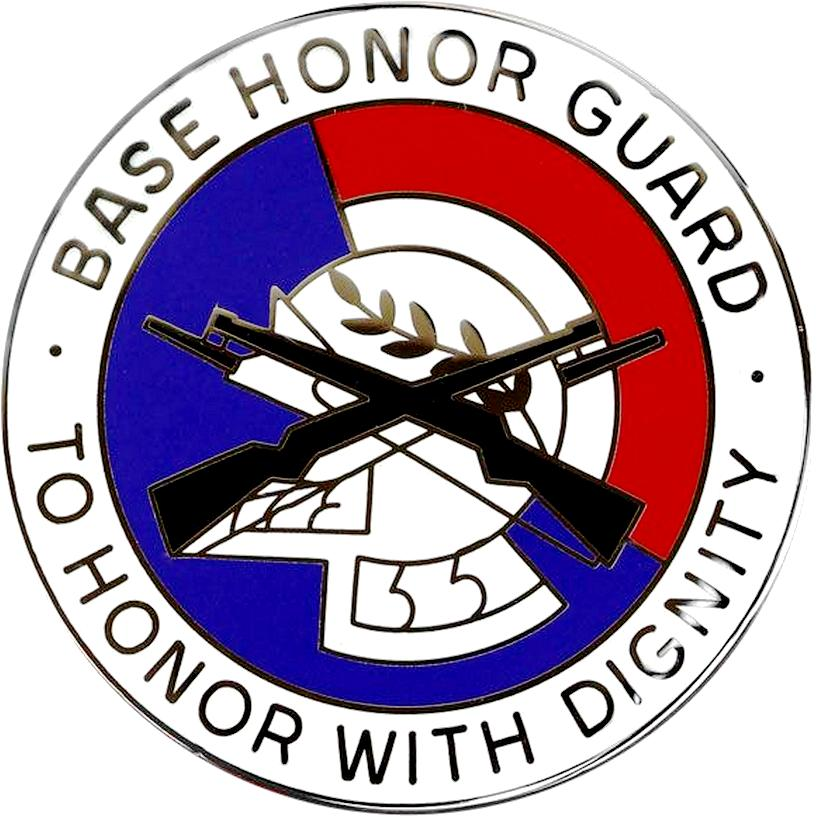
Base Honor Guard Badge

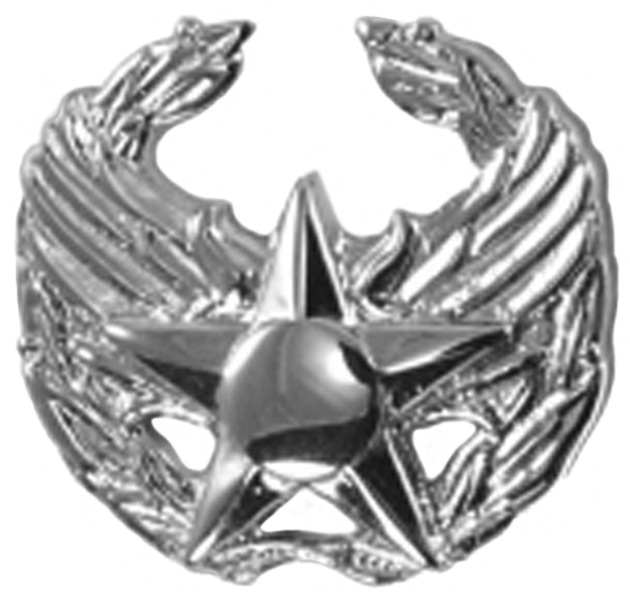
Commander's Insignia

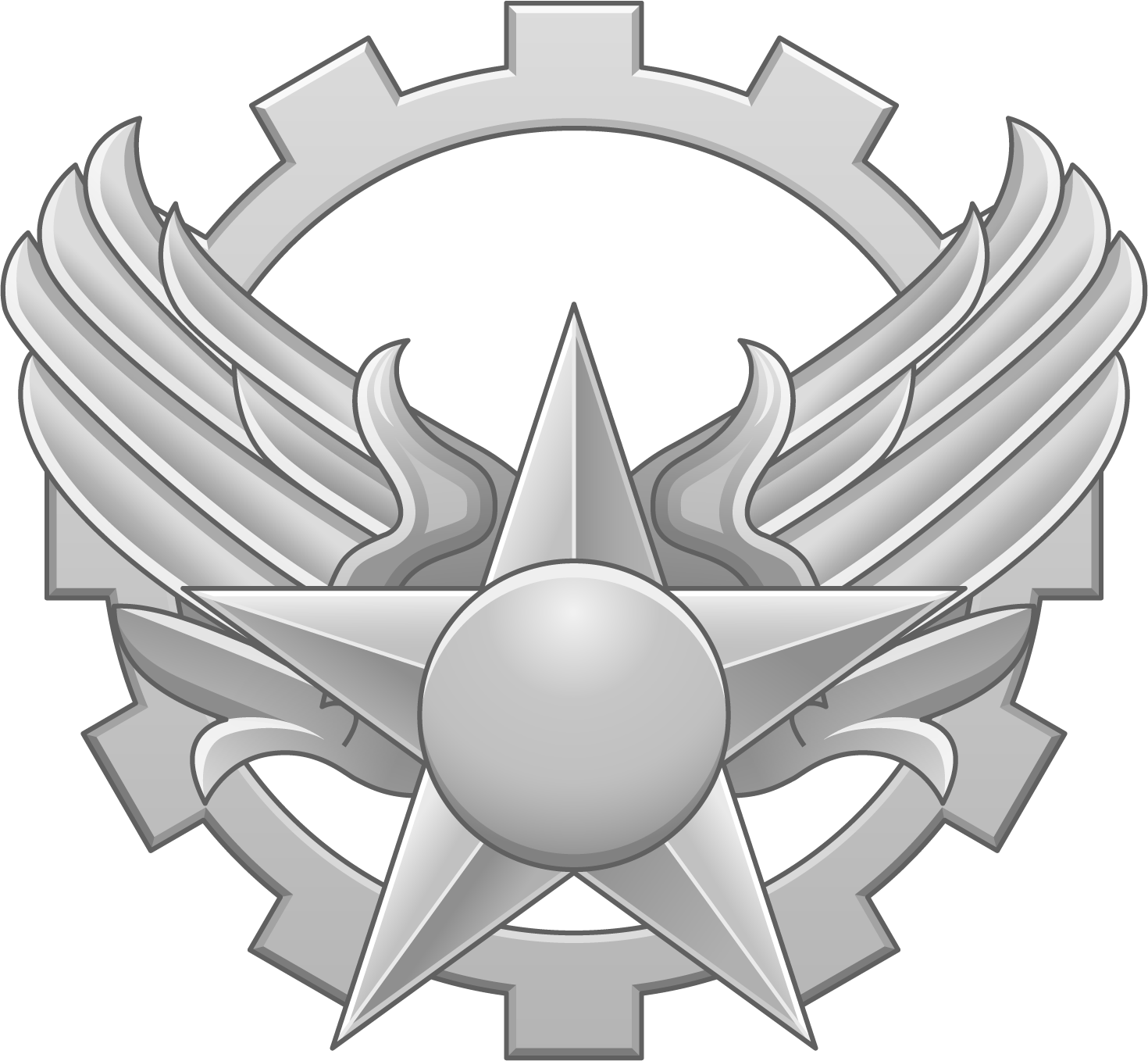
Materiel Leader Insignia

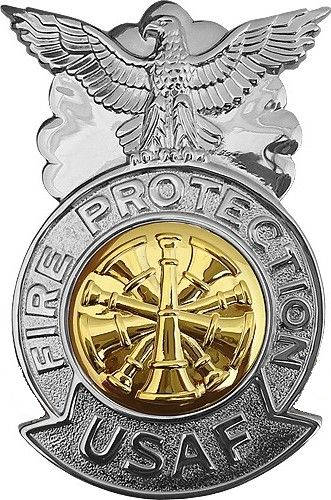
Fire Protection Badges

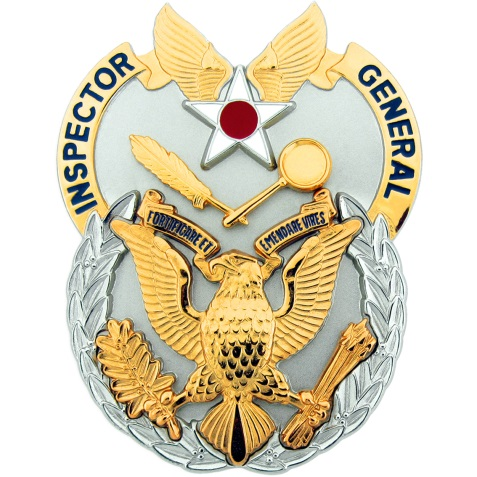
Inspector General Badge

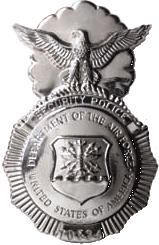
Security Forces Badge

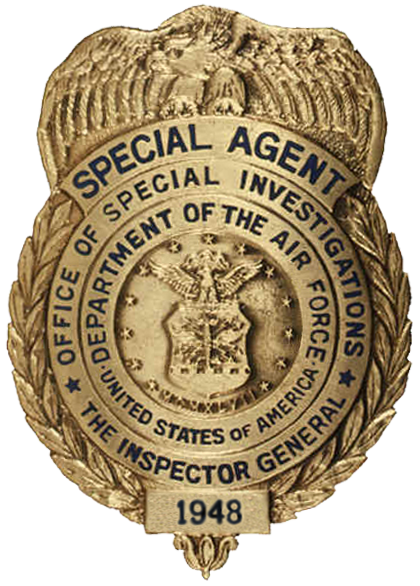
Office of Special Investigations Special Agent Badge

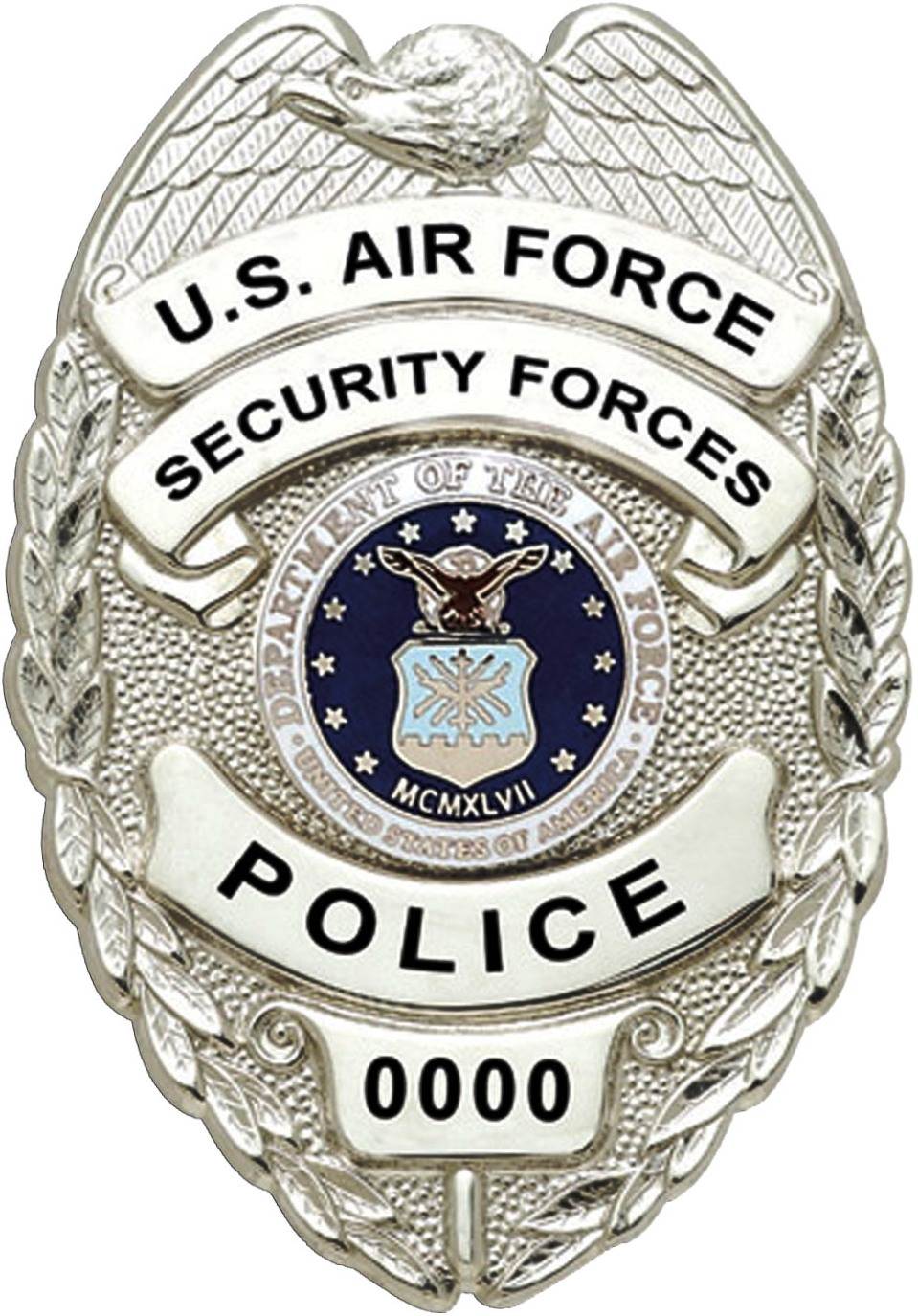
Department of the Air Force Police Badge (Civilian)

=== U.S. Space Force ===
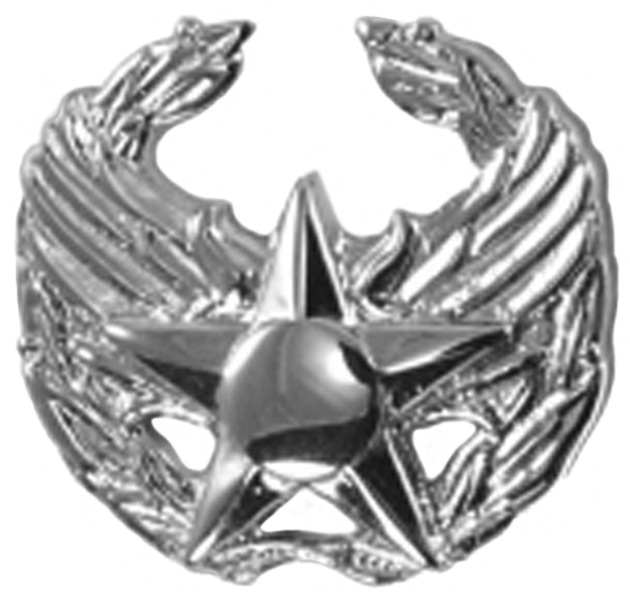
Commander's Insignia

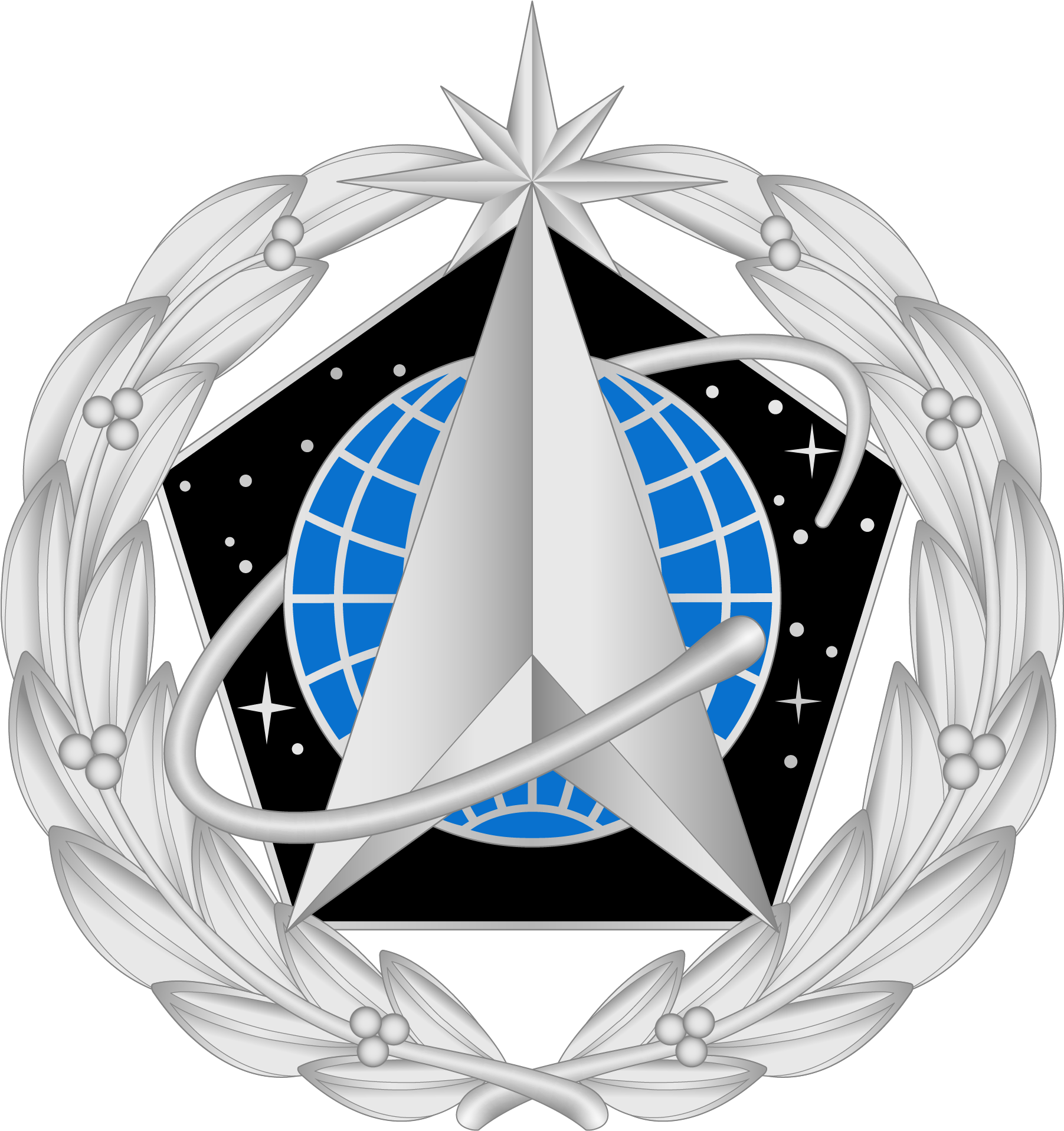
Space Staff Badge

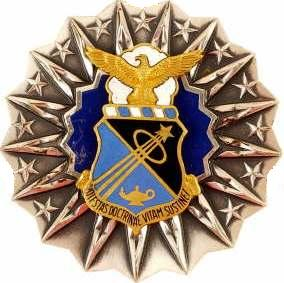
Permanent Professor Air Force Academy Badge

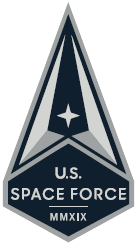
Lapel Insignia

== Department of Homeland Security ==
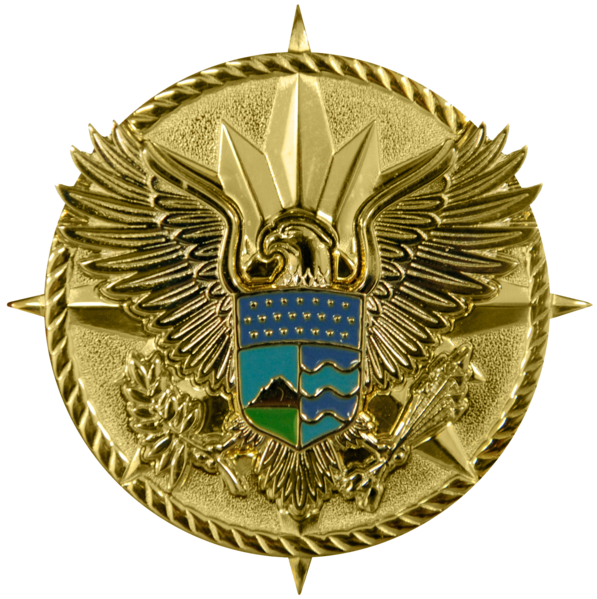
Office of the Secretary of Homeland Security Identification Badge

=== U.S. Coast Guard ===
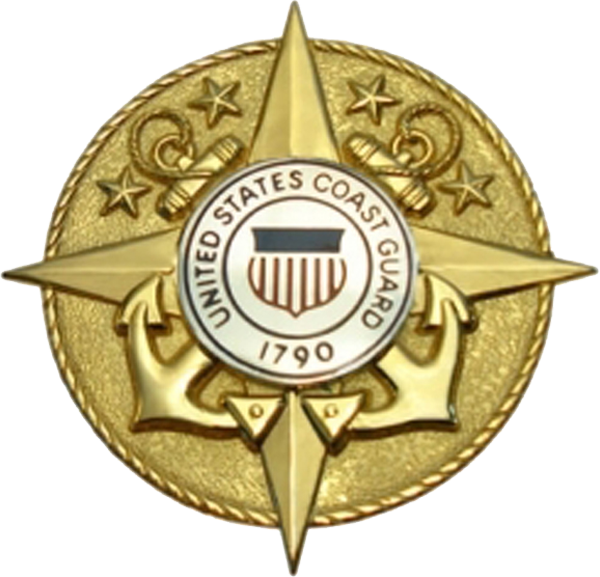
Commandant Staff Badge

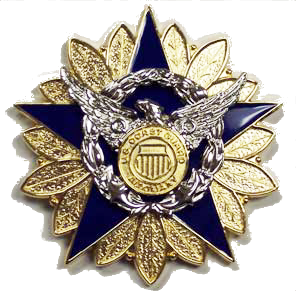
Auxiliary National Staff Badge

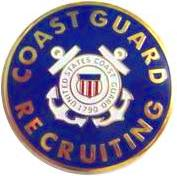
Recruiting Badges

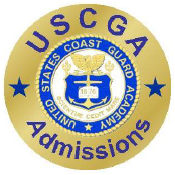
Academy Admissions Recruiting Badge

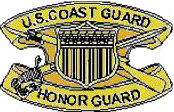
Honor Guard Badge

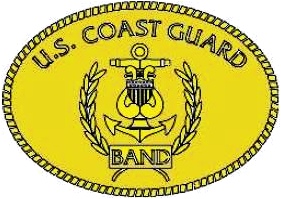
Band Badge

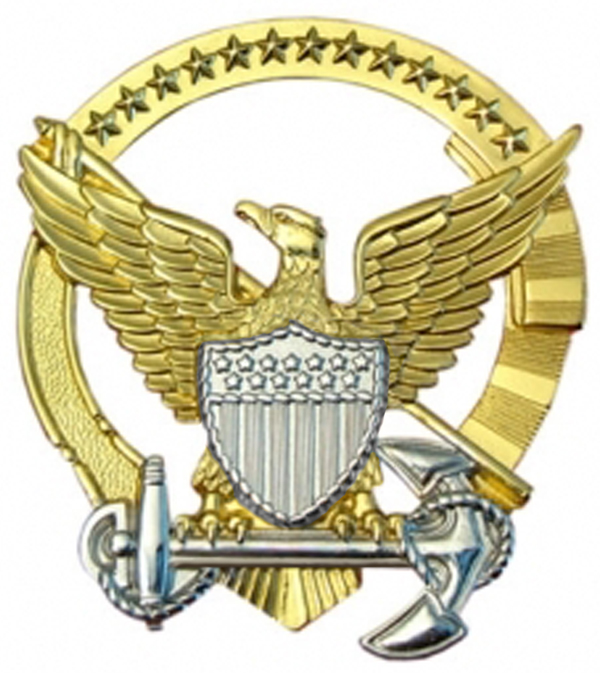
Command Afloat Pin

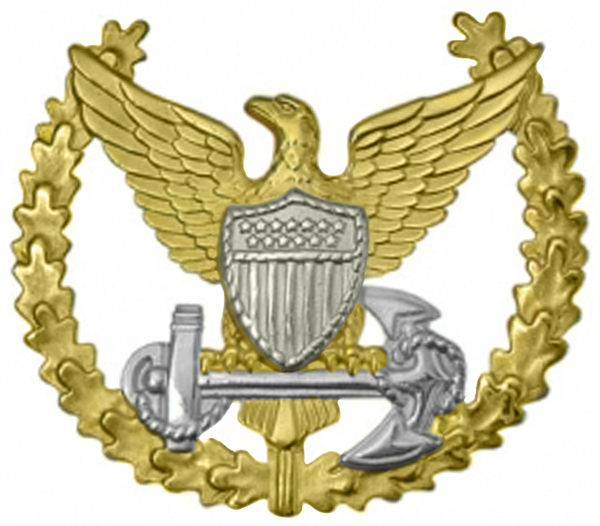
Command Ashore Pin

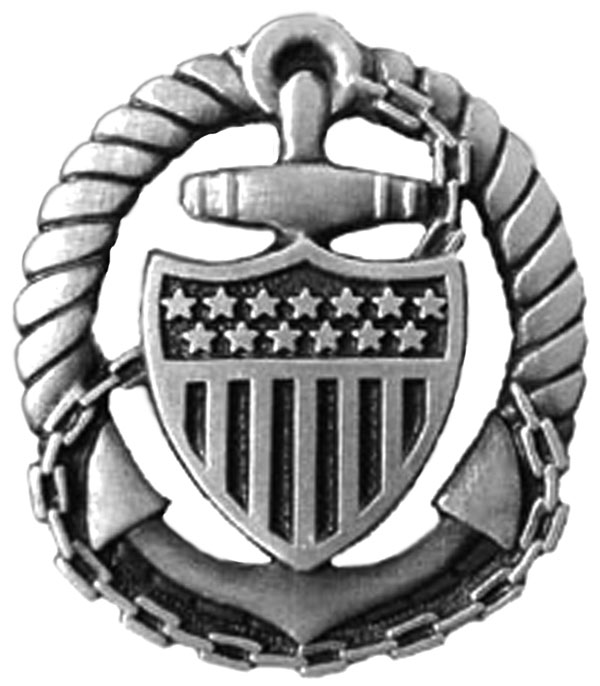
Officer-in-Charge Afloat Pin

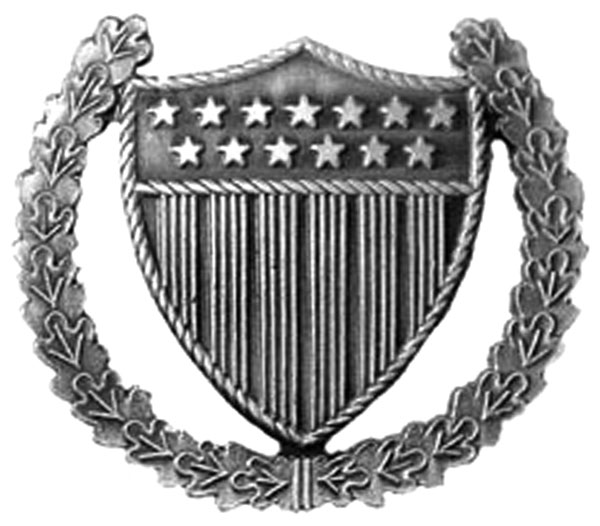
Officer-in-Charge Ashore Pin

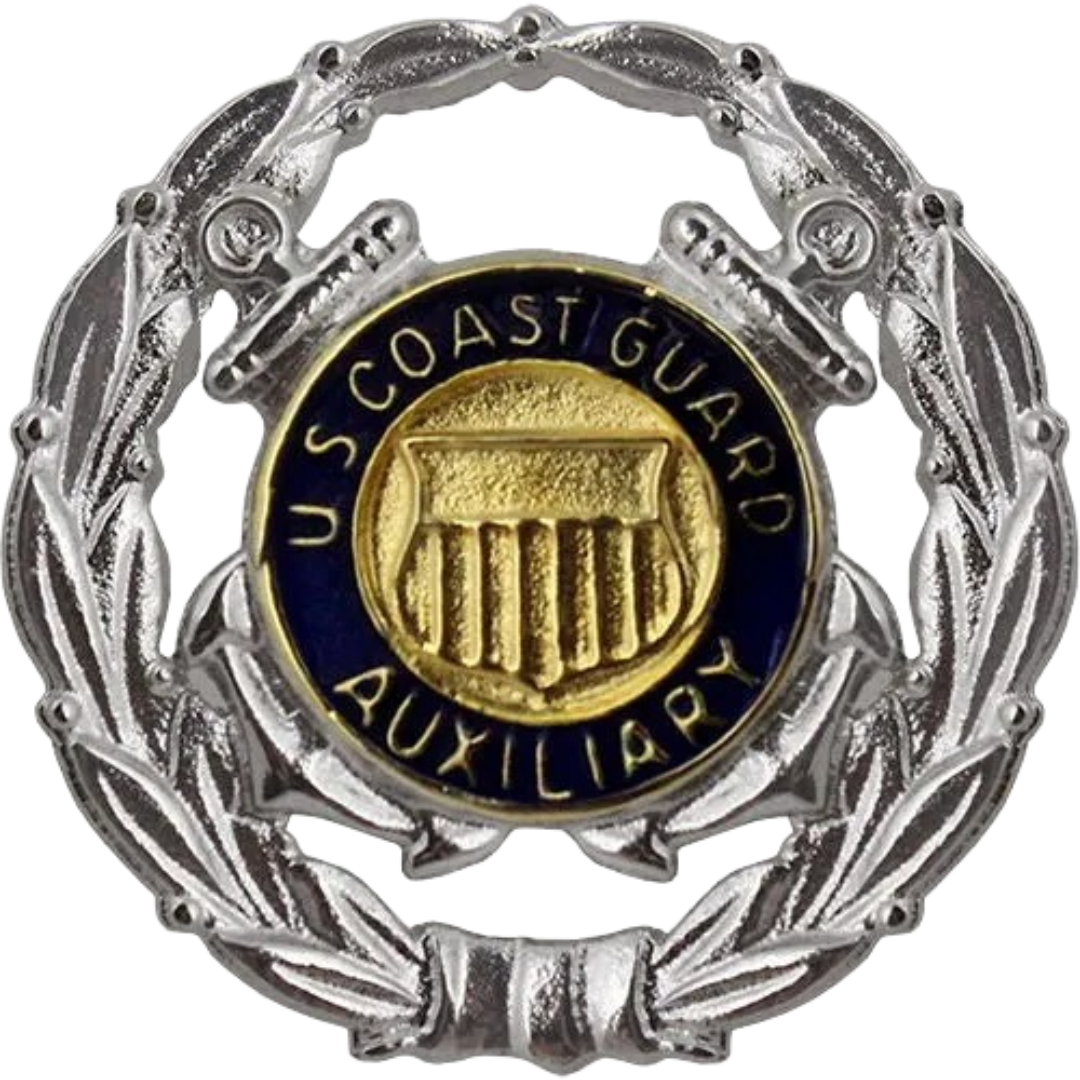
Auxiliary Operations Device

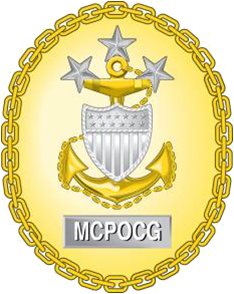
Commandant-designated Command Senior Enlisted Leader Identification Badges

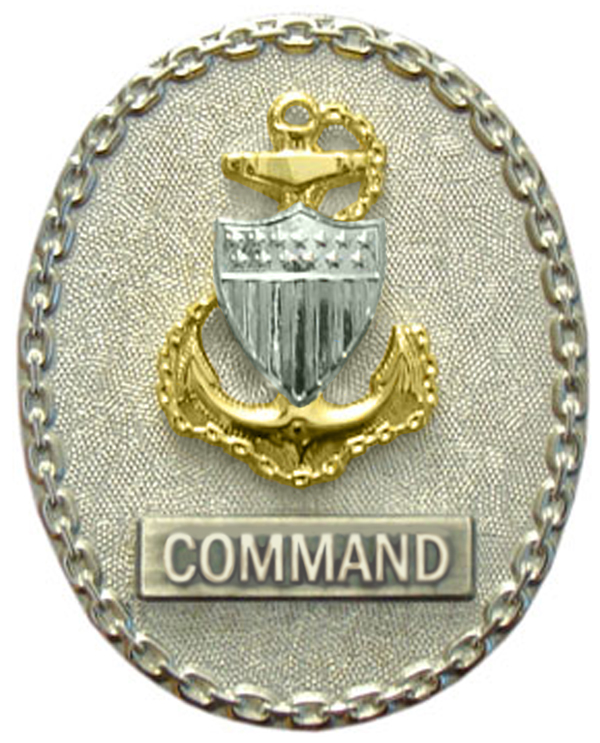
Non-designated Command Senior Enlisted Leader Identification Badges

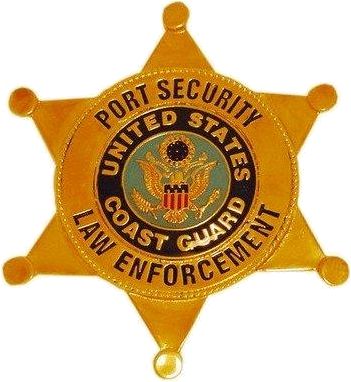
Port Security Law Enforcement Badge

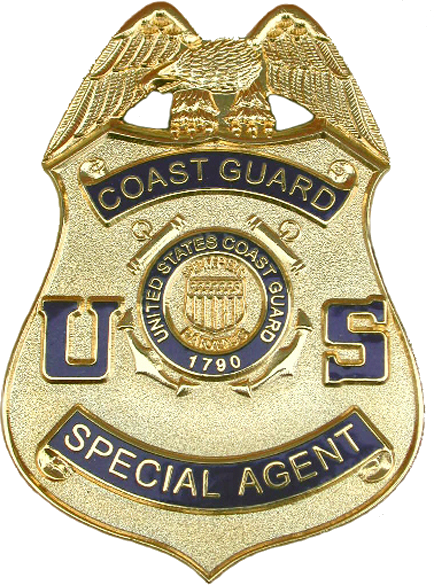
Special Agent Badge

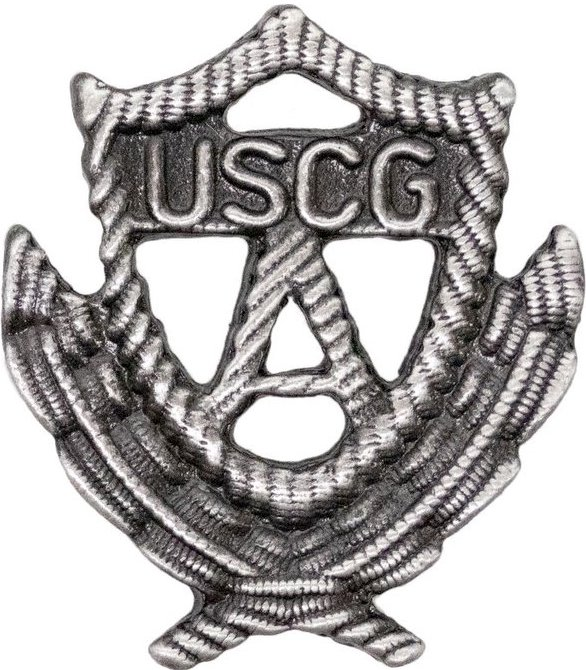
U.S. Coast Guard Auxiliary Past Officer Badge

== Department of Health and Human Services ==
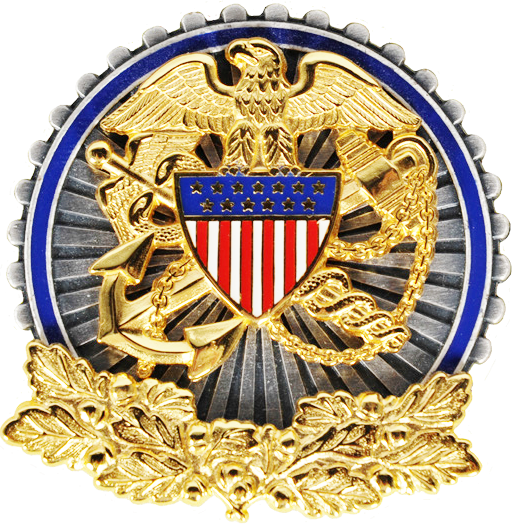
Department of Health and Human Services Identification Badge

=== U.S. Public Health Service Commissioned Corps ===
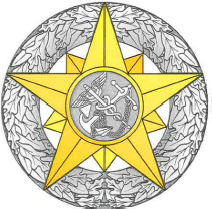
Assistant Secretary for Health / Principal Deputy Secretary for Health Officer-in-Charge Badge

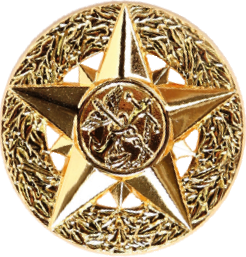
Surgeon General Badge

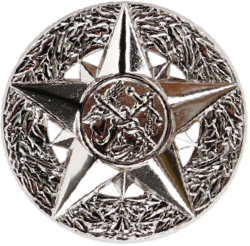
Deputy Surgeon General Badge

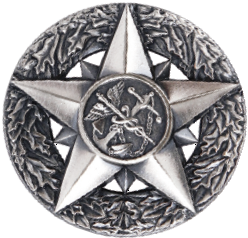
Officer-in-Charge Badge

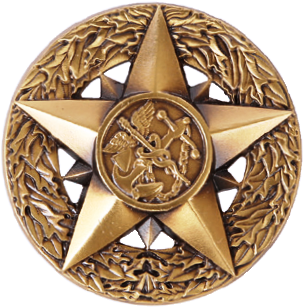
Chief Professional Officer Badge

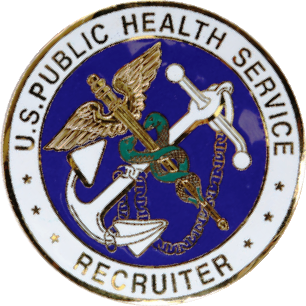
Recruiter Badges

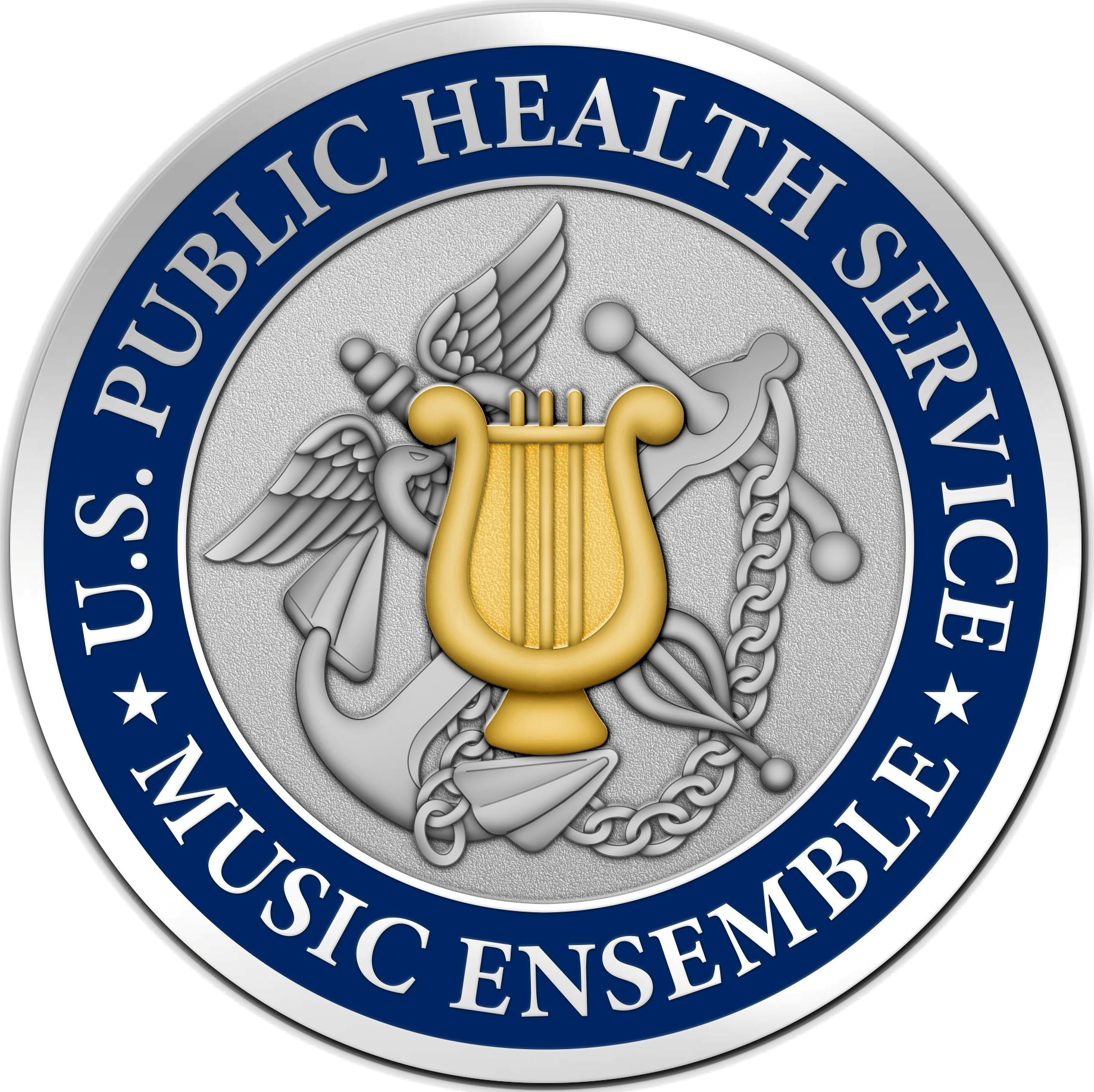
Music Ensemble Badge

== Department of Commerce ==
=== National Oceanic and Atmospheric Administration Commissioned Officer Corps ===
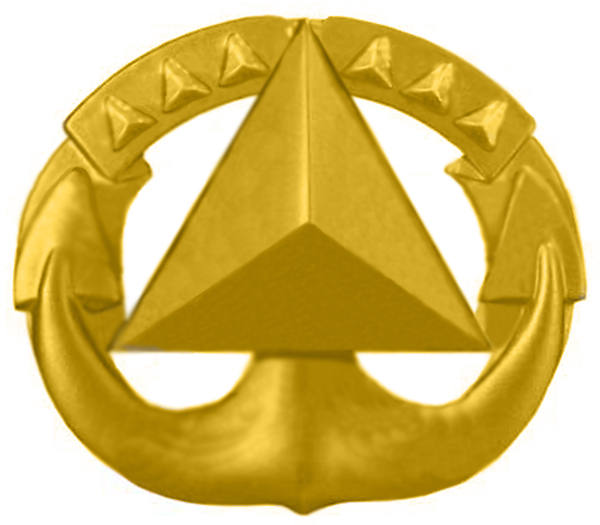
Command-at-Sea insignia

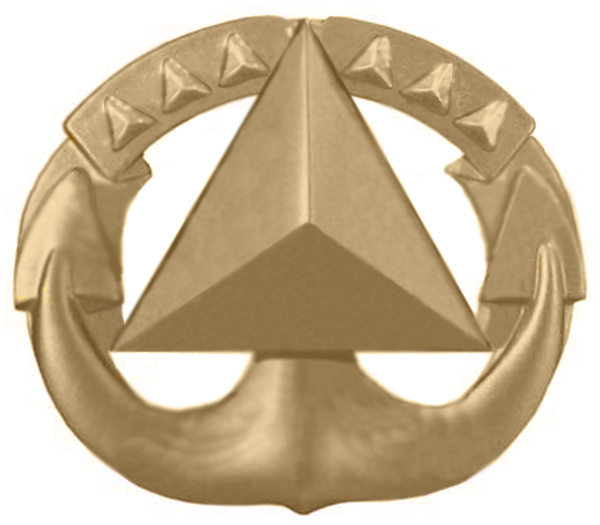
Small-Craft-Command Insignia

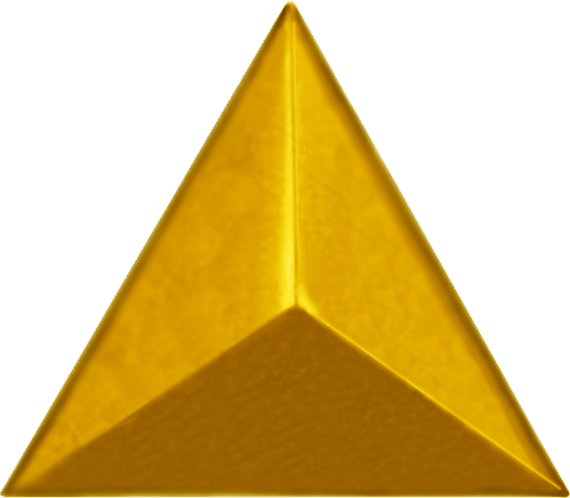
Chief-of-Party insignia

== See also ==
- Military badges of the United States
- Awards and decorations of the Public Health Service
- Awards and decorations of the National Oceanic and Atmospheric Administration
- Obsolete badges of the United States military
- United States Army branch insignia
- List of United States Army careers
- List of United States Marine Corps MOS
- United States Navy staff corps
- List of United States Navy ratings
- Air Force Specialty Code
- List of United States Coast Guard ratings
