= Danyell E. Wilson =

U.S. Army Honor Guard (born 1974)

Danyell Elaine Wilson (born July 16, 1974) is a former U.S. Army soldier and former member of the 3rd U.S. Infantry Regiment, best known as "The Old Guard”. She is the first-ever African American female tomb guard for the Tomb of the Unknown Soldier at Arlington National Cemetery.

== Early life and military service ==
Wilson was born on July 16, 1974, in Montgomery, Alabama. In February 1993, Wilson enlisted in the U.S. Army. She served as a military police soldier for the Military Police Company, 3rd U.S. Infantry (The Old Guard). After eight-month training, Wilson became a member of the Honor Guard Company of The Old Guard, one of the U.S. Army’s most prestigious units.

On January 22, 1997, Wilson became the first African American female tomb guard for the Tomb of the Unknown Soldier (Arlington), a historic US monument at Arlington National Cemetery which honors the unidentified remains of three combatants from World War I, World War II and the Korean War.

At the time, Wilson was the second woman and one of only 400 soldiers to have earned the prestigious Guard, Tomb of the Unknown Soldier Identification Badge since its creation in 1958 (In 1996, Sergeant Heather Lynn Johnsen was the first woman to serve as a Tomb Guard). Prior to 1993, the US Army prohibited women from serving guard duty at the Tomb of the Unknowns.

== Honors ==
- In 2018, the US Army Women’s Hall of Fame inducted Wilson as a member of its Hall of Fame as part of a consortium of four Female Sentinels at the Tomb of Unknowns.
