= Guard, Tomb of the Unknown Soldier Identification Badge =

U.S. military badge awarded to Tomb of the Unknown Soldier Honor Guard members

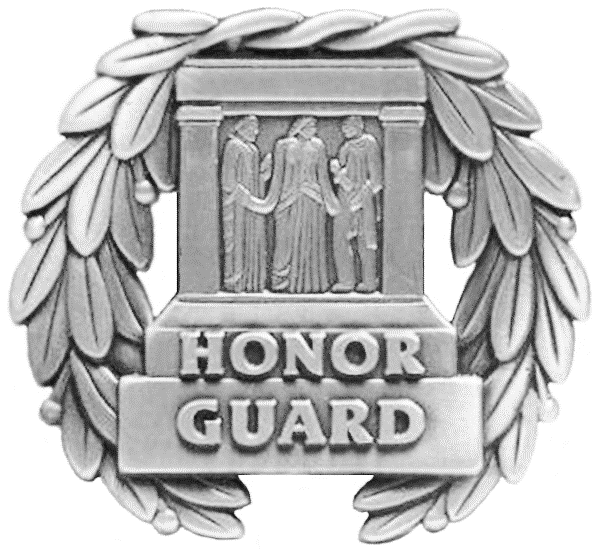
- Type: Military badge
- Presented by: United States Army
- Eligibility: Members of the Honor Guard at the Tomb of the Unknown Soldier
- Status: Currently awarded
- Established: February 7, 1958

Highlights
- Total: 736
- Related: Military Horseman Identification Badge

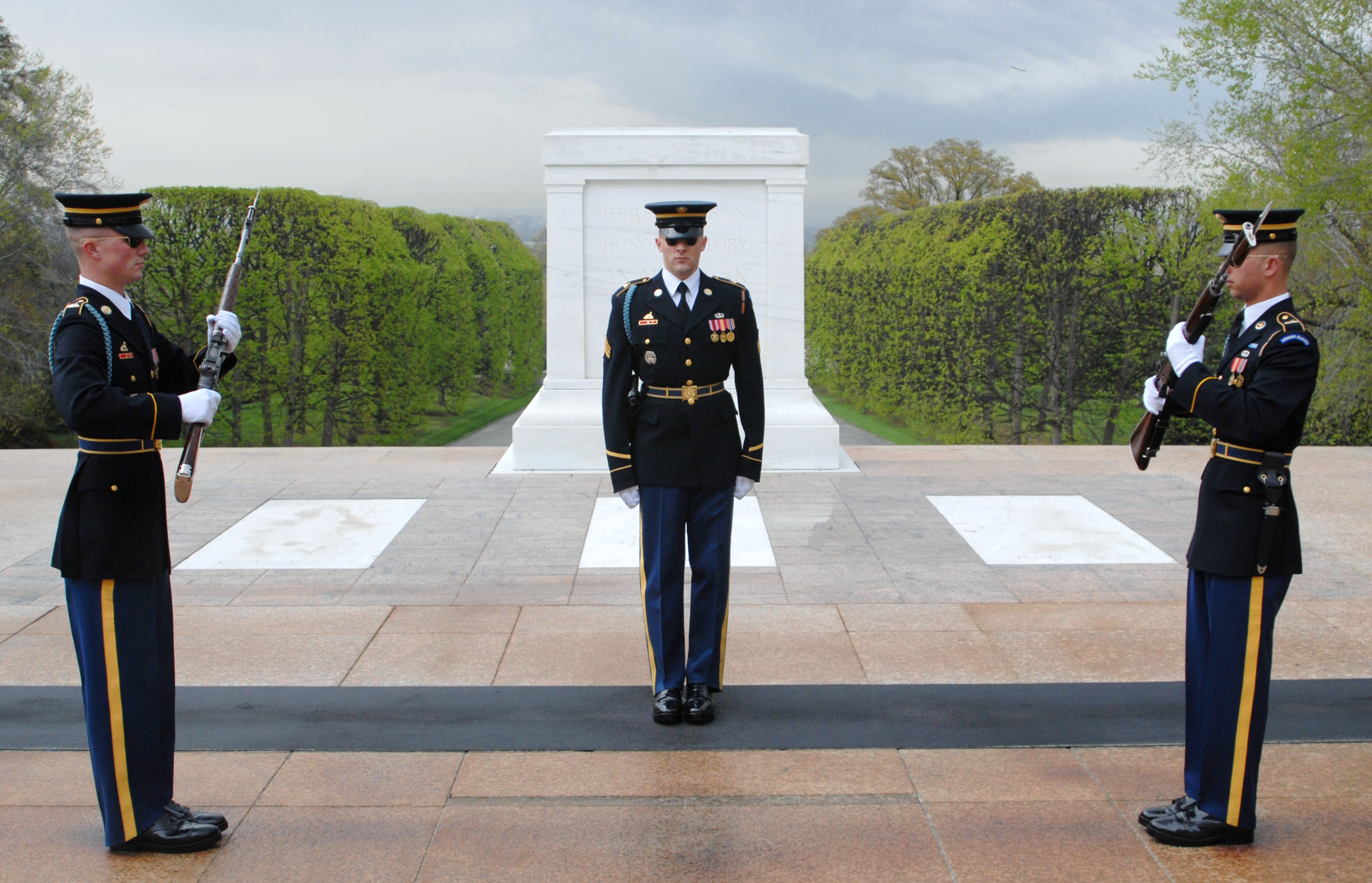
Sentinels conduct "change of the guard" ceremony at the Tomb of the Unknowns, circa 2005

The Guard, Tomb of the Unknown Soldier Identification Badge is a military badge of the United States Army that honors those soldiers who have been chosen to serve as members of the Honor Guard, known as "Sentinels", at the Tomb of the Unknown Soldier. It is the third-least awarded badge in the U.S. Military, after the Military Horseman Identification Badge and the Astronaut Badge. As of March 2024, 736 soldiers have been awarded this badge.

== Design ==
The badge itself is made of heavy sterling silver approximately two inches in diameter. The obverse design consists of an inverted wreath, a sign of mourning, and the East face of the Tomb which contains the figures of Peace, Valor and Victory. Superimposed on the bottom of the Tomb under the three figures are the words "Honor Guard".

The badge was designed in 1956 and first issued to members of the Honor Guard at the Tomb of the Unknown Soldier on February 7, 1958. The badge was first issued only as a temporary wear item, meaning the Soldiers could only wear the badge during their tenure as members of the Honor Guard. Upon leaving the duty, the badge was returned and reissued to incoming Soldiers. In 1963, regulations were changed to allow the badge to be worn as a permanent part of the military uniform after the Soldier's completion of duty at the Tomb of the Unknown Soldier. It was also permanently awarded to those who had previously earned it.

== Award process ==
The bestowing authority of the Guard, Tomb of the Unknown Soldier Identification Badge is the Commanding Officer, 4th Battalion, 3rd U.S. Infantry in accordance with Army Regulation 600-8-22. For a service member to permanently receive the badge, they must serve nine months as a member of the Honor Guard and receive a recommendation from the Commanding Officer of the Honor Guard Company.

The Guard, Tomb of the Unknown Soldier Identification Badge can be revoked if a Soldier disgraces themselves in a manner that brings dishonor on the Tomb. This action can happen even after the Soldier completes their tour as a member of the Honor Guard.

== Recipients ==
The first recipient of this badge was William Daniel, a former prisoner of war who served as a tomb sentinel and sergeant of the guard at the Tomb of the Unknown Soldier from February 1957 to June 1960. He retired with the rank of Master Sergeant in 1965 after 22 years of Army service. Daniel died in 2009 and is interred in Section 35 at Arlington National Cemetery, located just south of the Tomb.

Women were not eligible to receive the badge until a woman in a military police unit was assigned to The Old Guard in 1993, thus enabling women to volunteer for guard duty at the Tomb. The first female soldier to earn the badge was Sgt. Heather Lynn Johnsen.
