= National Guard Bureau Organizational Badge =

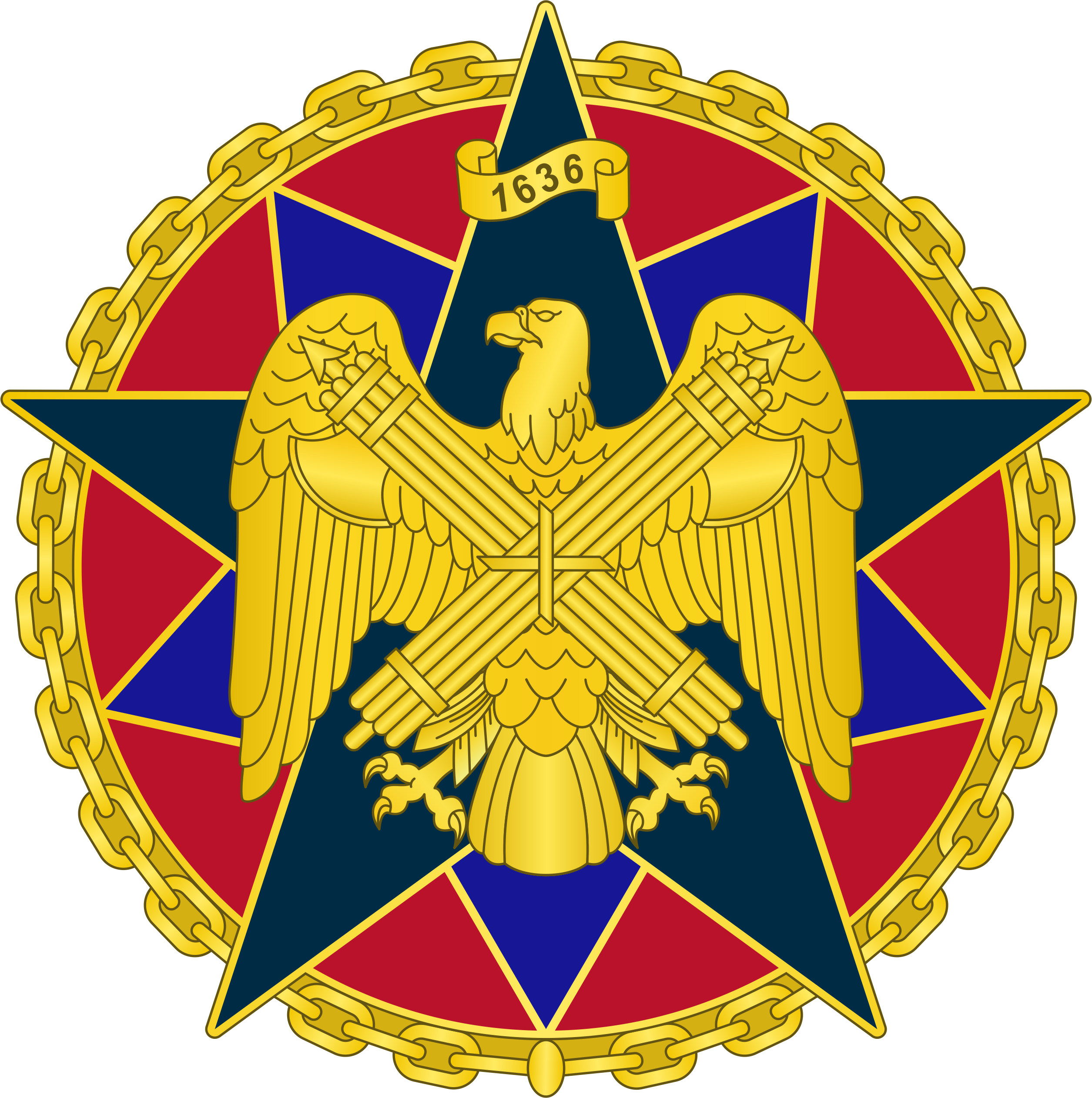
- Awarded for: For US Army and Air Force personnel assigned to the National Guard Bureau
- Date: Since 2017
- Country: United States
- Presented by: National Guard Bureau

The National Guard Bureau Organizational Badge is an identification badge of the United States Armed Forces which is awarded to personnel of the U.S. Army and U.S. Air Force National Guard who are assigned to the National Guard Bureau (NGB). The badge is to be worn on the dress uniform and was originally authorized for wear only while assigned to the NGB. In 2018, new instructions allow permanent wear after one year qualifying service with the NGB. The badge was officially announced by USAF Gen. Joseph Lengyel, then chief of the National Guard Bureau, at the Pentagon on the National Guard's 381st anniversary. The badge was first proposed in 1949. Since 2008, the NGB operates as a joint activity of the Department of Defense and the chief has since been made a four-star general position with additional authority.

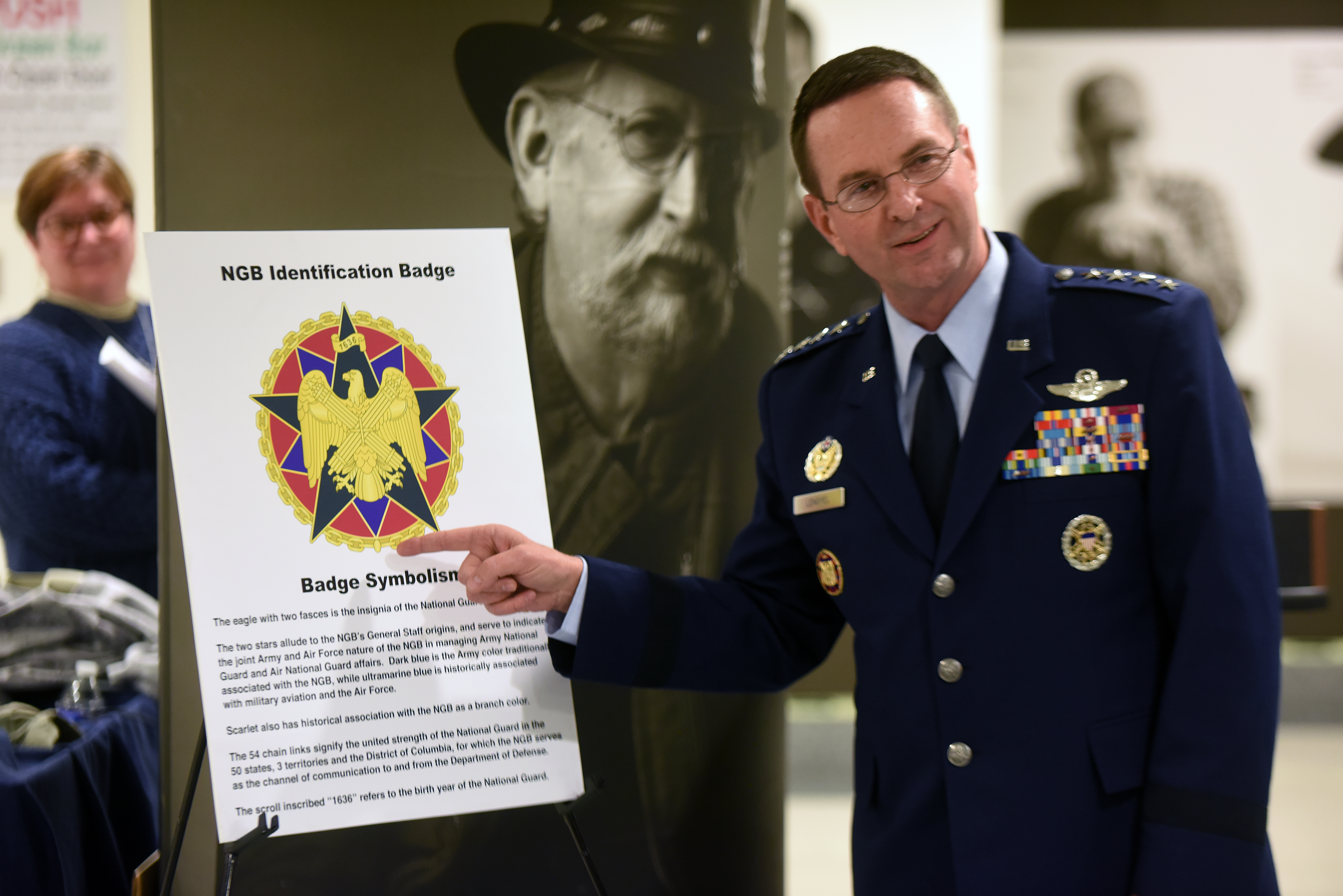
Air Force Gen. Joseph Lengyel, chief, National Guard Bureau, points out a detail on the new National Guard Bureau Organizational Badge unveiled at a cake-cutting honoring the 381st birthday of the National Guard, the Pentagon, Arlington, VA, Dec. 13, 2017. The badge is authorized for wear while assigned to the NGB and is not permanently awarded. (U.S. Army National Guard photo by Sgt. 1st Class Jim Greenhill)

"The badge features the eagle insignia from the NGB seal overlaid on two blue stars representing the Army and Air National Guard. The year 1636 is inscribed on the top of the badge, referring to the year the Guard was established. These features are encircled by 54 chain links representing each state, territory and the District of Columbia that make up the Guard." according to Army Lt. Col. Jeff Larrabee, NGB chief historian.
