= Small Craft insignia =

Insignia of the United States Navy

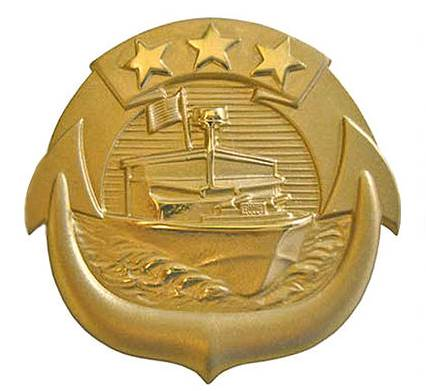
Small Craft Officer in Charge insignia

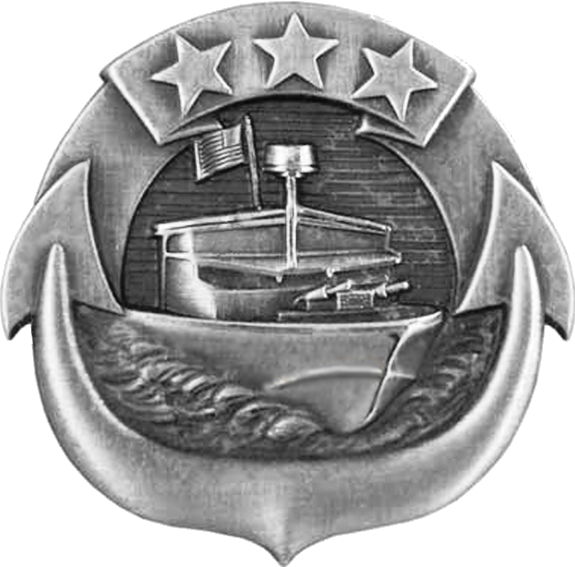
Small Craft Petty Officer in Charge insignia

The Small Craft Insignia (more commonly known as the Small Craft Pin) is a military award of the United States Navy.

It was created after the Vietnam War to give recognition to the specially trained naval personnel of the inshore boat units and river assault commands.

The Small Craft Pin (commonly called the 'Coxswain Pin' or 'Boat Pin' by U.S. Navy sailors) is issued in gold for officers and silver for enlisted personnel. It shows a small craft circumscribed by anchor flukes on the sides and bottom and a three-star pennant on top. The three stars represent the three main areas of U.S. Navy riverine operations in Vietnam: Game Warden, Market Time, and Sealords (Southeast Asia, Lakes, Oceans, Rivers and Deltas Strategy). Waves under the small craft represent the past, present, and future. The anchor represents the Navy.

To qualify for the Small Craft insignia, a service member must complete full qualifications at every watch station of a small craft. This normally includes positions as crewman/gunner, engineer, navigator, and coxswain. Enlisted personnel must have served as the Petty Officer in Charge (POIC) of a small craft for six months. Officers must hold the additional qualification of Watch Officer.

Small Craft Insignia is also worn by Maritime Expeditionary Squadron (MSRON) sailors and Coast Guardsmen attached to MSRON squadrons who qualify as Tactical Craft Coxswain. The Tactical Craft Coxswain is overall responsible for the safety of the craft and crew, as well as tactical movements, and weapons employment. The Tactical Craft Coxswain must complete the Tactical Craft Operations (TCO) PQS, as well as, attend various schools pertaining to navigation, tactical maneuvers, and defense tactics. The Tactical Craft Coxswain possesses weapons release authority and is the ultimate authority on board for all decisions, unless embarked with a Patrol Leader or SOPA (Senior Line Officer Present Afloat). Their authority comes from Article 1033 (Chapter 10 of ALNAV PRECEDENCE, AUTHORITY AND COMMAND) which states: "Authority in a Boat" Except when embarked in a boat authorized by the Chief of Naval Operations to have an officer or petty officer in charge, the senior line officer (including commissioned warrant and warrant officer) eligible for command at sea has authority over all persons embarked therein, and is responsible for the safety and management of the boat." As such, the Tactical Craft Coxswain is petty officer in charge of a boat authorized by the CNO and may not be relieved of command of the craft unless by their Patrol Leader, or authorizing Commander.

Sailors who have earned the silver pin while enlisted, then become commissioned officers are authorized to begin wearing the gold pin. (This is the only enlisted device that is authorized to change color upon the wearer's commissioning without further qualification.) The pin may be awarded, by default, to any officer given command of a unit that uses small boats, upon receipt of the Command Ashore Pin, regardless of previous qualifications.

The Small Craft Pin is authorized by local commanders and is not considered a warfare qualification badge, such as the Surface Warfare Officer (SWO) insignia. People who served on small craft during World War II may receive the pin by asking the Department of the Navy.

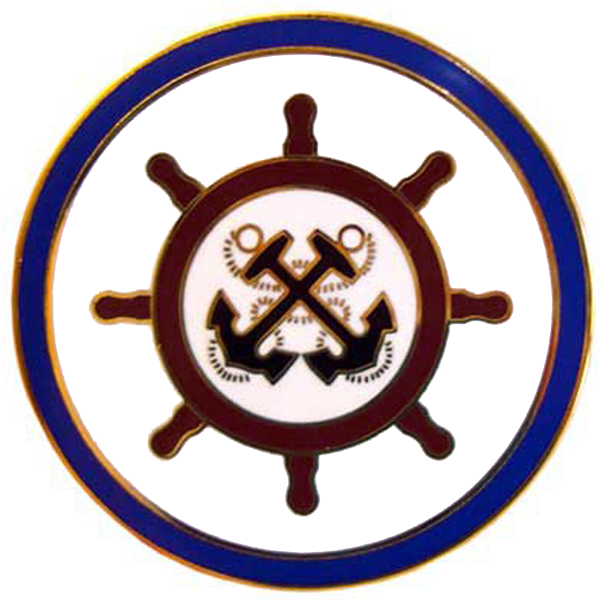
Craftmaster Insignia

The Navy maintains a similar pin, the Craftmaster Insignia, for those qualified in the operation of vessels such as Landing Craft Utility, Landing Craft Air Cushioned, large harbor tugs, and various other tugs and barges. It is also awarded to certain staff officers and some midshipmen.

== See also ==
- List of United States Navy enlisted warfare designations
- Badges of the United States Navy
- Military badges of the United States
- Obsolete badges of the United States military
- Uniforms of the United States Navy
