= Command at Sea insignia =

Badge in the US military

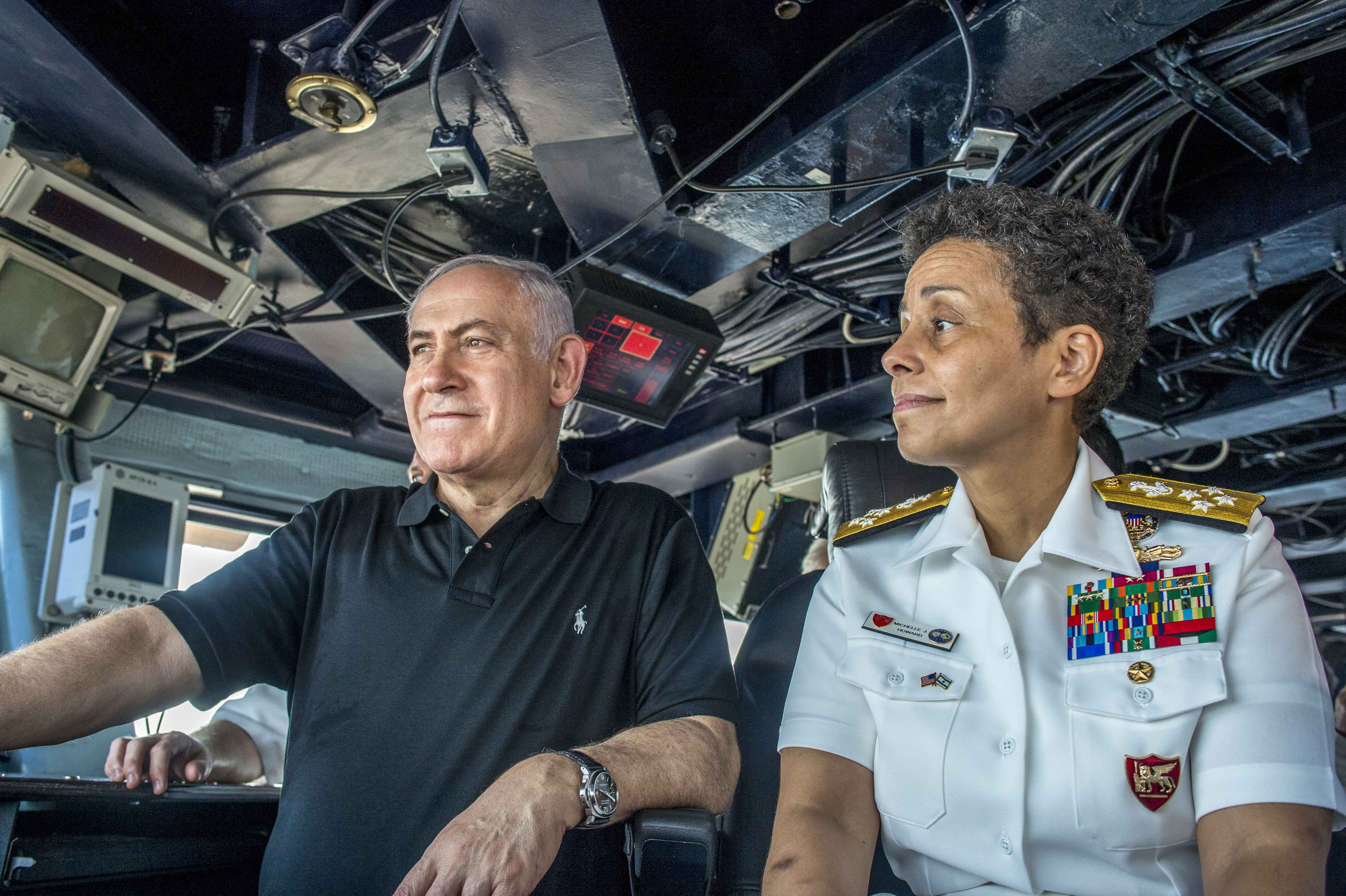
Admiral Michelle Howard in 2017 wearing a command-at-sea pin in the post-tour position; flag officers were not allowed to wear them in the post-tour position before 2015.

The Command at Sea insignia is a badge of the United States' seagoing services worn by officers on their uniforms to denote that they are the commander, or formerly a commander, of a warship. If the wearer is currently the commander of a warship, it is worn above the nametag, which is worn a quarter of an inch above the right chest pocket on a uniform shirt. Afterwards, the pin is moved to the left side of the shirt or jacket. Commanders of land-based installations wear a different but similar badge, known as the Command Ashore insignia, instead.

== U.S. Navy ==
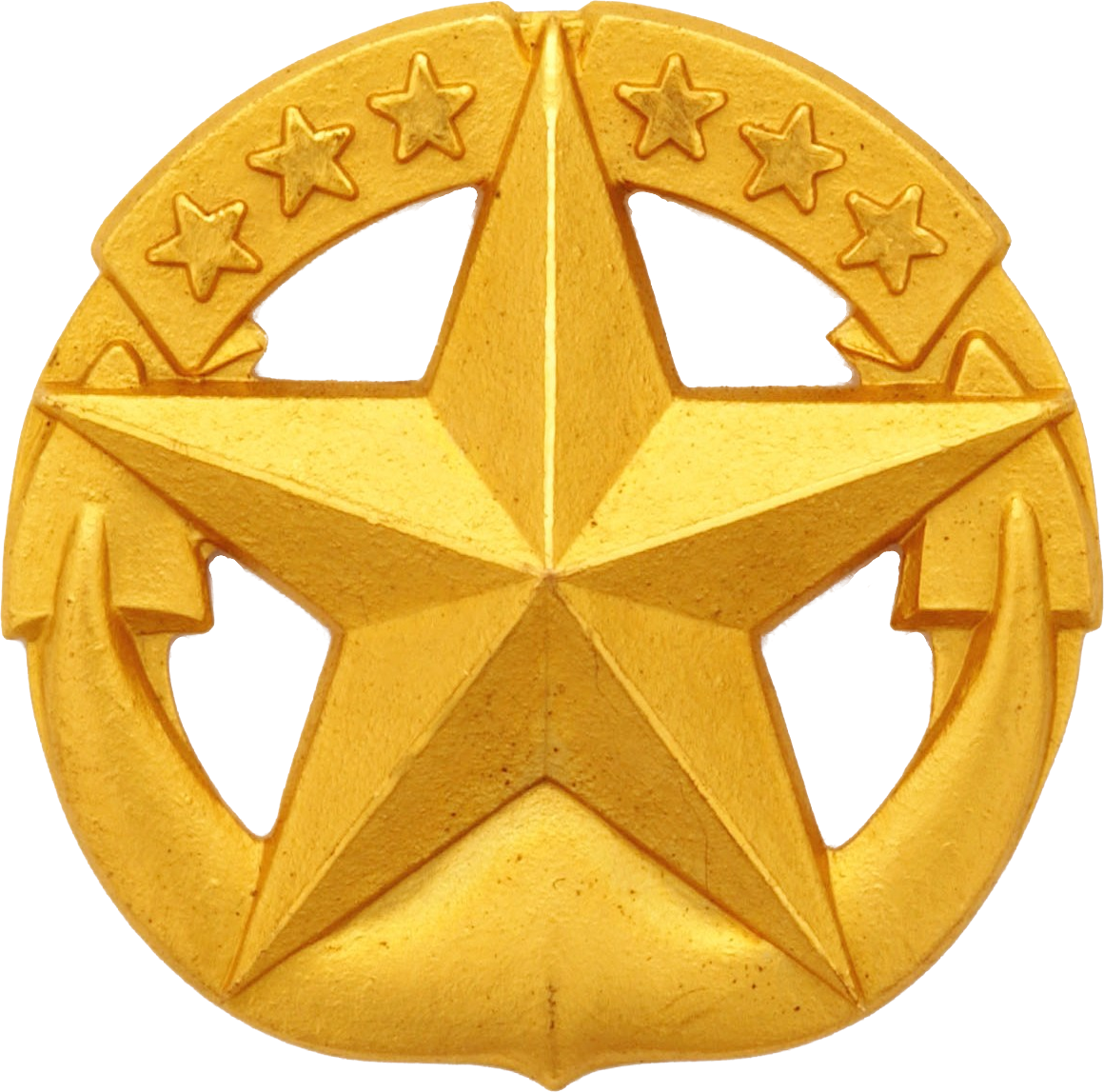
The U.S. Navy's Command at Sea insignia

=== Wear ===
Either is worn centered over the right pocket while the wearer is holding an active command at sea billet as an incumbent, and is worn centered on the upper portion of the left pocket flap, under the warfare insignia and ribbons, after completion of the command tour.

A post tour officer wears the insignia on the left breast 1/4 inch below the top of the pocket/flap. If a warfare or qualification insignia is already occupying that position, it is then worn 1/4 inch below that insignia, or on uniforms with pocket flaps, 1/4 inch below the flap. Women in full dress will wear post tour command insignia 1/4 inch above the left pocket, medals or primary breast insignia. Men in full dress will wear their post-tour insignia below the bottom row of medals, or below their second qualification or warfare badge if they have one. Only one post-tour command insignia was worn until September 2018, after which both can be worn, the sea version inboard of the ashore version.

==== Wear by flag officers ====
Prior to late 2015, U.S. Navy officers previously awarded the Command at Sea pin were not allowed to wear it upon promotion to rear admiral, lower half. In 2015, wear by U.S. Navy flag officers was authorized, but only in the post-tour position, below the ribbon bars on a dress or service uniform. In August 2021, the regulations were further modified to permit flag officers to wear command insignia in the incumbent position if currently holding an eligible command.

=== History ===
The Command at Sea insignia was established in the U.S. Navy in 1960 and is for commissioned officers between the ranks of lieutenant (O-3) and captain (O-6) who are in or have been in command of a commissioned warship or submarine, an operational fleet air unit, or a SEAL command at the O-5 or O-6 level.

The Command Ashore/Project Manager insignia, designates senior officers who are in command of, or have previously commanded, a ship, submarine, operational/deployable fleet air unit in naval aviation, or a special warfare (SEAL) unit. This includes those in charge of a major program or project (the latter being primarily in the Naval Air Systems Command or Naval Sea Systems Command).

=== Design ===
The six stars on the Command at Sea insignia represent the first six ships of the United States Navy: USS United States, USS Constellation, USS Constitution, USS President, USS Congress, and USS Chesapeake.

== U.S. Coast Guard ==
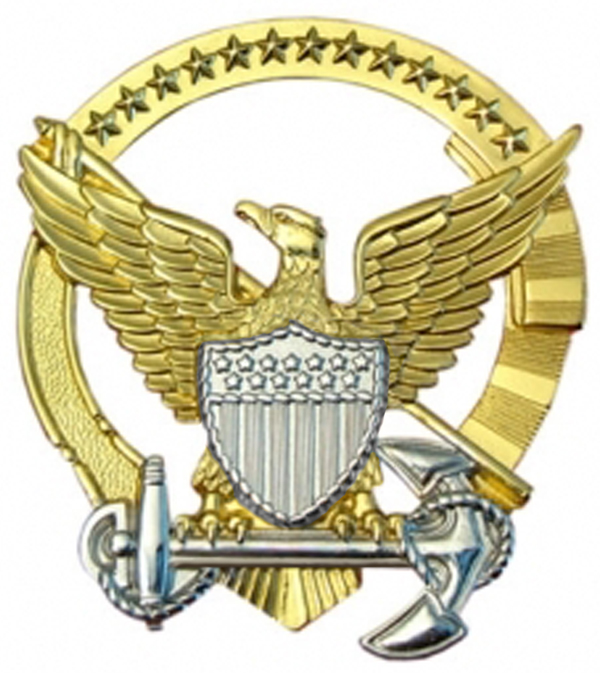
U.S. Coast Guard Command Afloat insignia

The United States Coast Guard uses an equivalent insignia to the U.S. Navy's Command at Sea pin, called the Command Afloat Badge. The Command Afloat insignia is a gold and silver metal device with a miniature Coast Guard officer cap device superimposed on a ribbon of gold with thirteen stars to represent the thirteen original American colonies. The Command Afloat insignia is worn in the same manner as the Command Ashore insignia and is considered superior to the Officer-in-Charge Afloat insignia.

== NOAA Commissioned Officer Corps ==
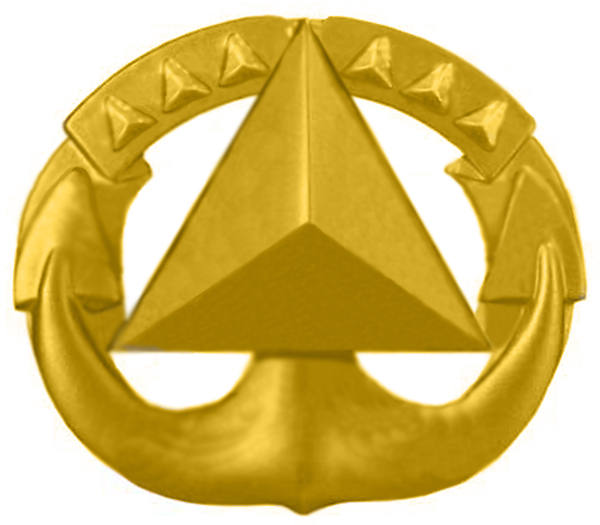
NOAA Corps Command at Sea insignia

The NOAA Commissioned Officer Corps Command at Sea badge is a gold-colored pin consisting of a triangle superimposed on anchor flukes and an unfurled commissioning pennant showing six triangles. The NOAA Command-at-Sea insignia is authorized for incumbents serving under orders designating them in command of Class 1 through Class 5 NOAA commissioned vessels. A NOAA Corps officer who previously successfully held command (but is not currently in command) of a NOAA commissioned vessel for at least six months during which the vessel was engaged for at least four months in operations at sea, is authorized to wear the Command-at-Sea insignia.

== See also ==
- Badges of the United States Coast Guard
- Obsolete badges of the United States military
- Uniforms of the United States Navy
- Air Force Commander's Insignia
- Air Force Materiel Leader's Insignia
