= Military Horseman Identification Badge =

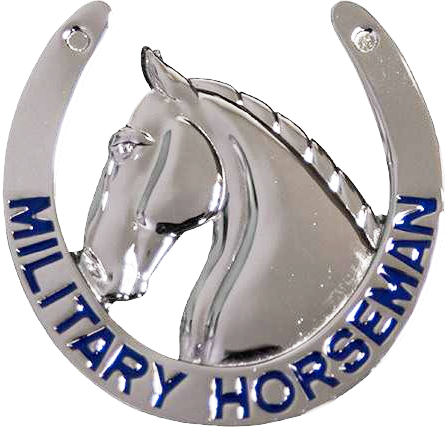
- Type: Badge
- Awarded for: Lead riders within the 3rd Infantry
- Presented by: United States Army
- Eligibility: Serving in the Caisson Platoon, 1st Battalion, 3rd Infantry Reg.
- Status: Currently awarded
- Established: July 18, 2017 (retroactive to February 1, 2013)
- First award: September 29, 2017

Highlights
- Total: Official list of badge holders

Precedence
- Next (higher): Driver and Mechanic Badge
- Related: Identification badges

The Military Horseman Identification Badge recognizes United States Army soldiers who complete the nine-week Basic Horsemanship Course and serve as a lead rider on the Caisson team within the 3rd U.S. Infantry Regiment (The Old Guard). The badge was first awarded on September 29, 2017, to soldiers during a ceremony held at Joint Base Myer-Henderson Hall, Virginia. According to Salute Uniforms, "the Military Horseman Identification Badge might be the most elusive skill badge a Soldier can earn."

The Military Horseman Identification Badge is authorized by the Commander, 3rd Infantry Regiment as a permanent part of the uniform for personnel who meet the following criteria:

a. Successfully complete the nine week Basic Horsemanship Course
b. Complete 100 Armed Forces Full Honors Funerals in Arlington National Cemetery
c. Served honorably for a minimum of nine months, which need not be continuous, while assigned as a member of the U.S. Army Caisson Platoon, 3rd Infantry Regiment
d. Be recommended by the Commander, 1st Battalion, 3rd Infantry Regiment

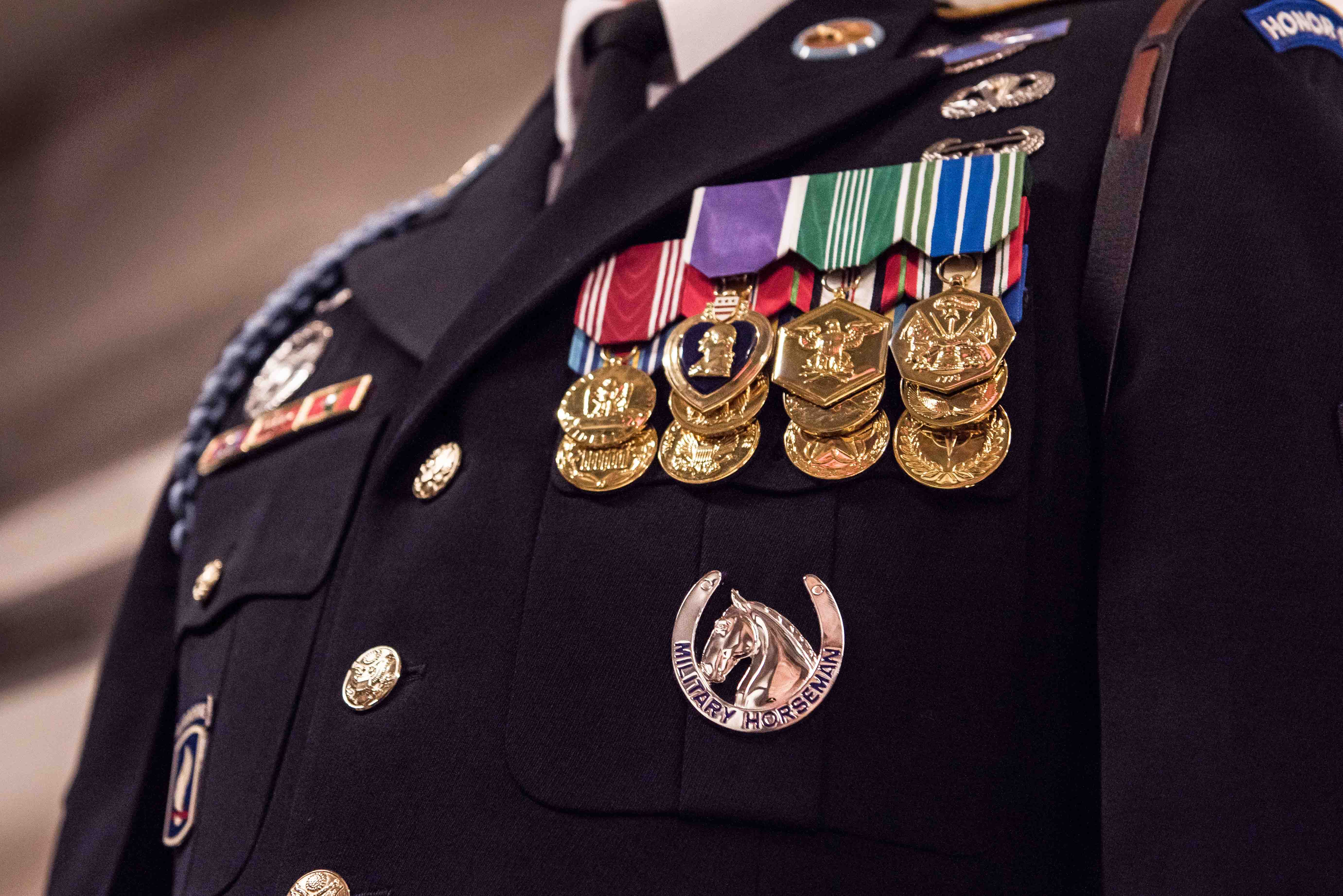
Soldiers from Caisson Platoon, 1st BN, 3rd Inf were awarded the first Military Horseman Identification Badge, during a special ceremony in Conmy Hall at Joint Base Myer-Henderson Hall in Sep. 2017.

Temporary wear of the Military Horseman Identification Badge may be authorized prior to serving the required nine months with the recommendation of the Commander, 1st Battalion, 3rd Infantry Regiment and approval by Commander, 3rd Infantry Regiment provided all other criteria have been met.

Soldiers reassigned from authorized positions within the U.S. Army Caisson Platoon prior to completion of nine months' service may be considered for permanent award on a case-by-case basis by the Commander, 3rd Infantry Regiment.

The Military Horseman Identification Badge is only awarded for those soldiers serving in the Caisson Platoon of the 3rd Infantry Regiment. It will not be awarded to soldiers serving in other positions with horse detachments or platoons.
