= Heather Lynn Johnsen =

Former US Army soldier

Heather Lynn Johnsen (born 1972 or 1973) is a former U.S. Army soldier and former member of the 3rd U.S. Infantry Regiment, best known as the highly prestigious "The Old Guard" or Honor Guard Company sentinel of Company E, 4th Battalion.

Johnsen was the first female tomb guard for the Tomb of the Unknown Soldier (Arlington), a historic monument at Arlington National Cemetery which honors the unidentified remains of three combatants from World War I, World War II and the Korean War.

== Early life ==
Johnsen was raised in Roseville, California and Mt. Diablo, California.

== Military service, tomb sentinel ==
In 1991 after graduating high school, Johnsen joined the US Army Reserves, serving as a personnel administrative specialist. In 1992, Johnsen joined the U.S. Army on active duty. She later served as a military police soldier in Camp Humphreys, Korea, Fort Monmouth, New Jersey, and Fort Myers, Florida.

In 1994, the Secretary of the Army ruled that women soldiers could serve on the 24 hour/7 days a week Tomb Sentinel squad for the Tomb of the Unknown Soldier (Arlington), a historic US monument at Arlington National Cemetery which honors the unidentified remains of three combatants from World War I, World War II and the Korean War. That same year, Johnsen joined The Old Guard. She became a military police soldier attached to Echo company honor guard, 3rd U.S. Infantry Division. In June 1995, she applied for training as a tomb sentinel.

On March 22, 1996, Johnsen became the first female tomb guard. Johnsen was the first woman among the then-389 soldiers who have received the prestigious tomb guard identification badge since its creation in 1958.

== Honors ==
- In 2018, the US Army Women's Hall of Fame inducted Johnsen as a member of its Hall of Fame as part of a group of four female Sentinels at the Tomb of Unknowns.
