= Command Ashore insignia =

Insignia of the US Navy and Coast Guard

Command Ashore insignia, formerly known as the Command Ashore/Project Manager insignia (or Command Ashore/Major Program Manager insignia), is a breast insignia of the United States Navy and the United States Coast Guard.

== United States Navy ==
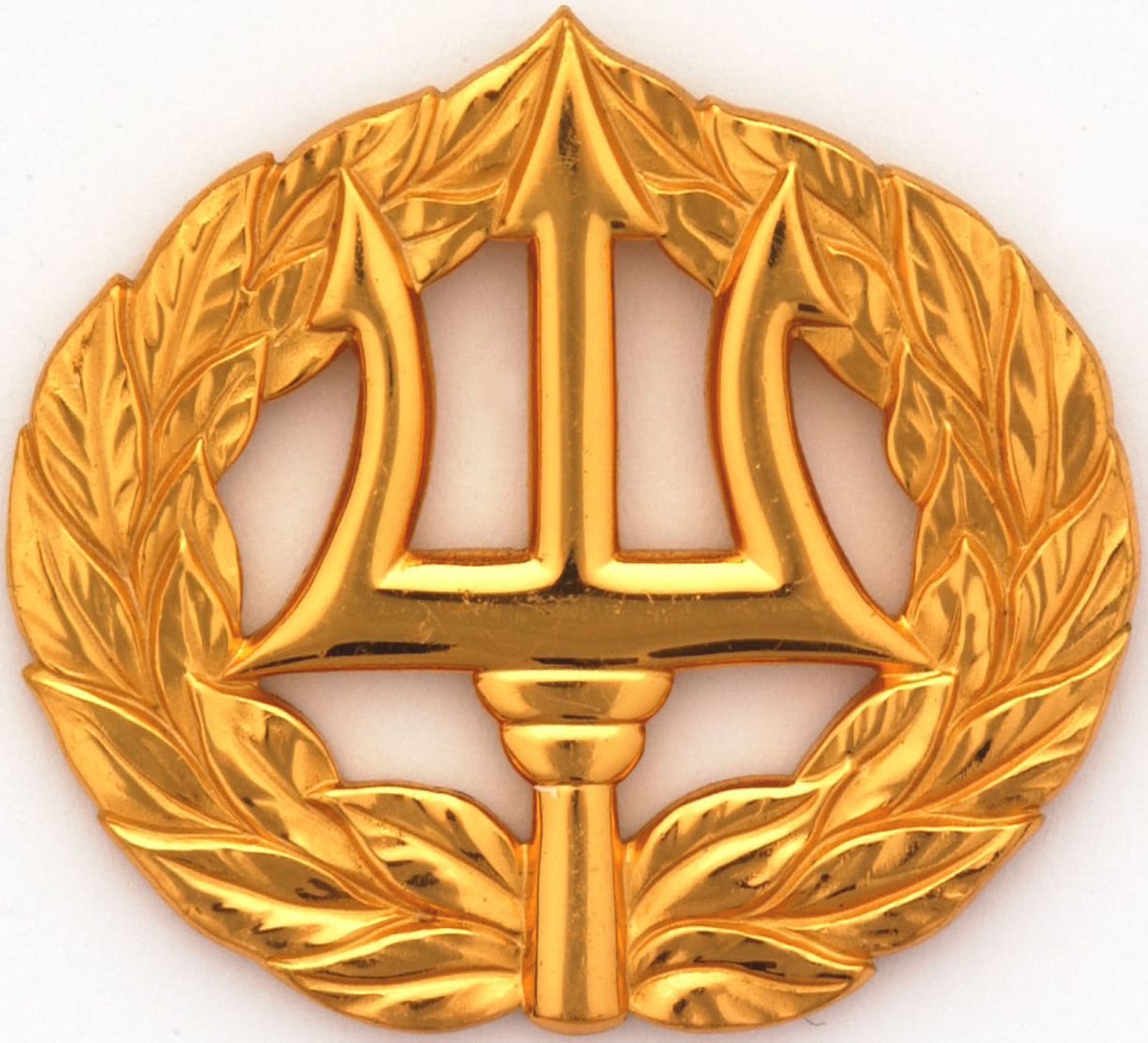
Navy Command Ashore Pin

In the U.S. Navy, the Command Ashore insignia is a gold metal, three-pronged trident device with a trident centered on an elliptically shaped laurel wreath. The badge is a breast insignia that recognizes the responsibilities and importance of command ashore and major program management.

Officers below flag rank (captain and below) who have, or had, command of an installation or commissioned unit ashore or served as a project manager wear the Command Ashore/Project Manager insignia. It is one of two badges known as Command Insignia; the other being the Command at Sea insignia. Officers wear this insignia in the same manner as that prescribed for the Command at Sea insignia.

== United States Coast Guard ==
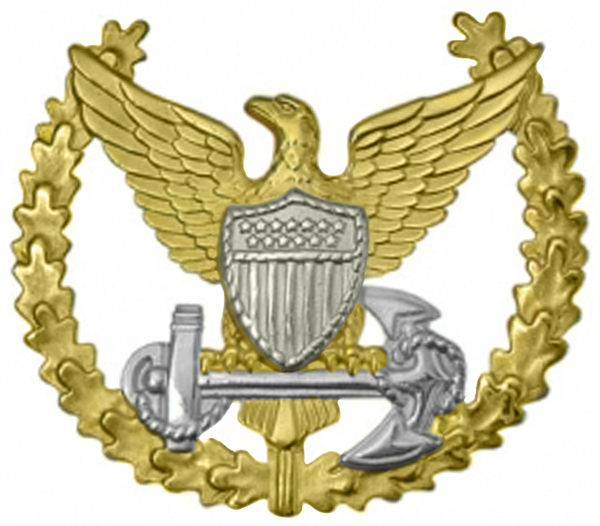
Coast Guard Command Ashore Pin

In the U.S. Coast Guard, the Command Ashore insignia is a gold and silver metal device with a miniature officer cap device superimposed on a wreath of gold oak leaves. The Command Ashore insignia is worn in the same manner as the Command Afloat insignia.

Per the Coast Guard Uniform Regulations, COMDTINST M1020.6F, chapter 3.E., the command ashore and command afloat insignia are considered equivalent.

== See also ==
- Military badges of the United States
- Obsolete badges of the United States military
