= Badges of the United States Air Force =

Military badges of the U.S. Air Force

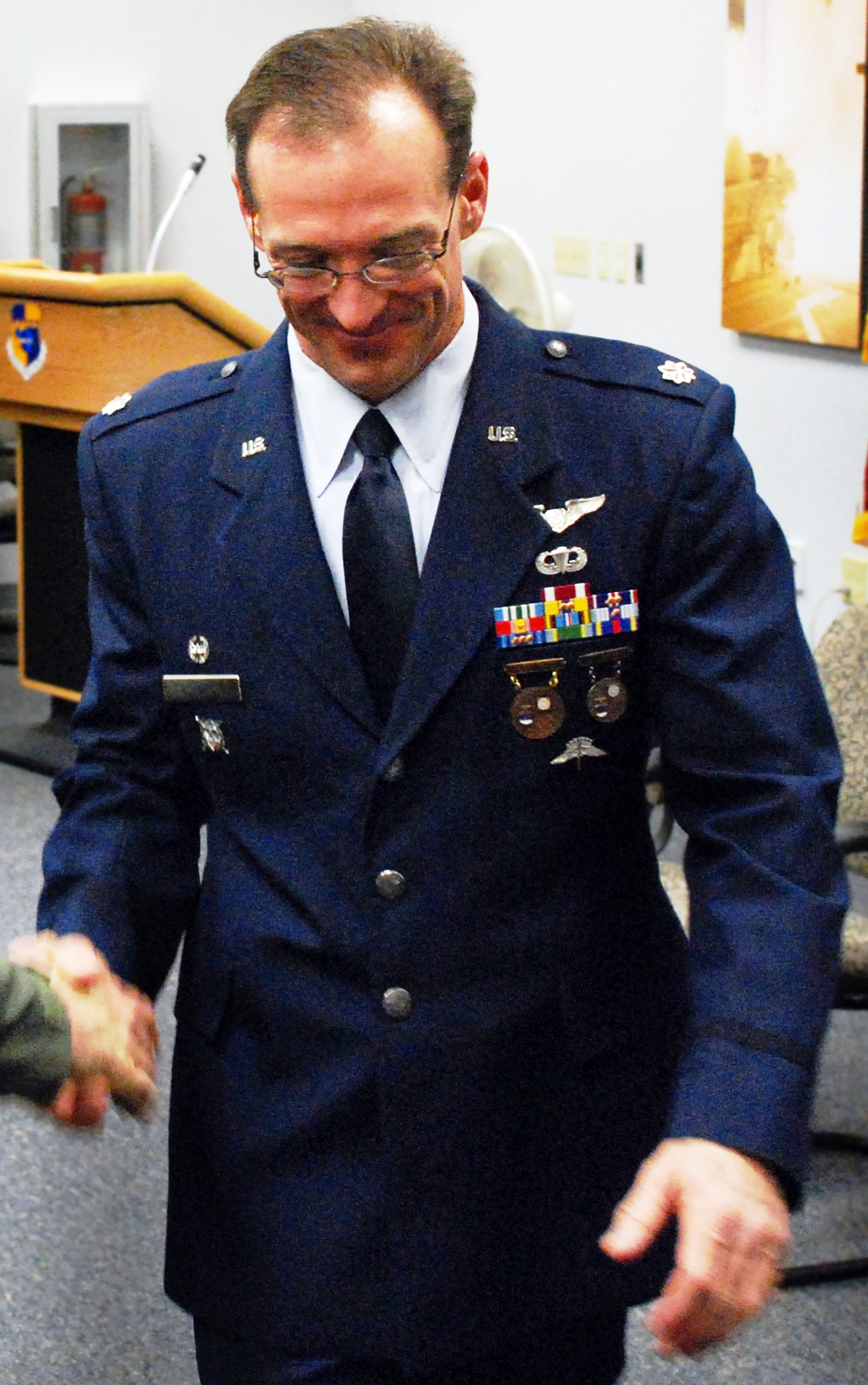
Badges earned by an Air Force officer from the 308th Rescue Squadron (2008)

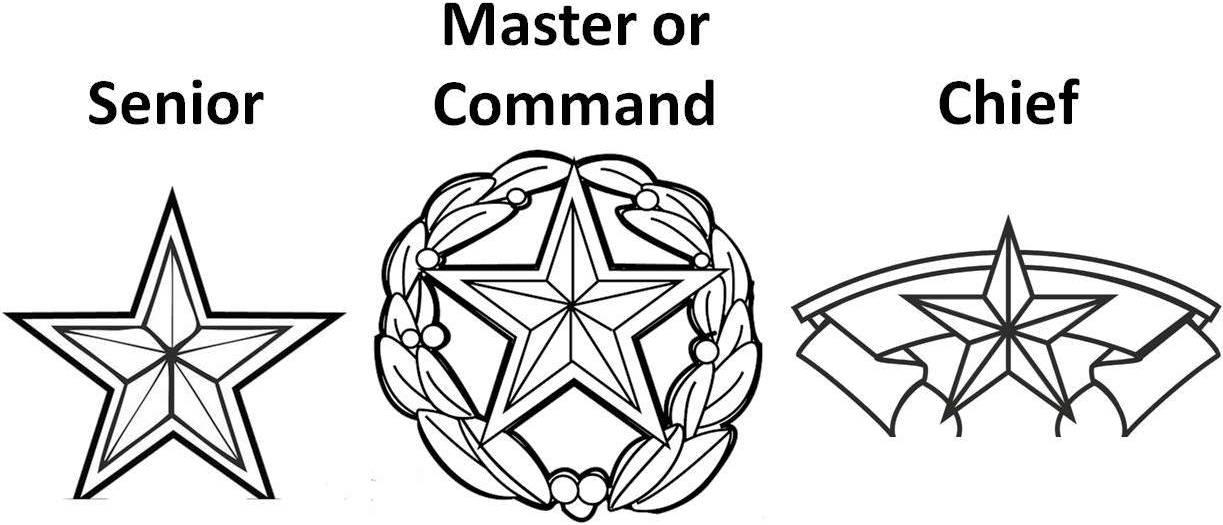
Air Force skill level badge symbols

Badges of the United States Air Force are specific uniform insignia authorized by the United States Air Force that signify aeronautical ratings, special skills, career field qualifications, and serve as identification devices for personnel occupying certain assignments.

Most Air Force badges are awarded in three degrees or skill levels. Aeronautical rating badges for pilots, combat systems officers, observers, and air battle managers are awarded at basic, senior, and command levels; while flight nurses and flight surgeons are awarded ratings at the basic, senior, and chief levels. All other aviation badges are awarded at the basic, senior, and master levels. Air Force occupational badges are normally issued in basic, senior, and master level for officers. A star and wreath system, worn above the Air Force badge, denotes which degree or skill level a service member currently holds. Previously, enlisted wear the basic badge after completing technical school, the senior badge after award of the 7-skill level, and the master badge as a master sergeant or above with 5 years in the specialty from award of the 7-skill level. For non-rated commissioned officers, the basic badge is awarded after completion of technical training, the senior badge after 7-years in their respective AFSC, and master at 15-years. Now most career field CFETPs denote the requirements for awarding each level.

Chaplain, aeronautical, space, cyberspace, and missile operations badges, along with the Air Force Commander's Insignia are mandatory for wear on Air Force uniforms. With the most recent changes to Air Force uniform regulations, restrictions have been lifted on the wear of other service's skill badges that airman have earned. Precedence of badges within the same category depends on the airman's current assignment.

The Air Force is the most restrictive service with regard to which Air Force badges may be worn on the uniforms by other branches of the US Armed Forces. Most badges issued exclusively by the Air Force may only be displayed on Air Force uniforms. The exception to this rule is the Space Operations Badge.

The Air Force previously authorized continued use of a number of aviation badges originally issued by the U.S. Army during World War II. Such badges are no longer authorized and are now categorized as obsolete badges.

== Aviation Badges ==
=== Aeronautical Rating Badges ===
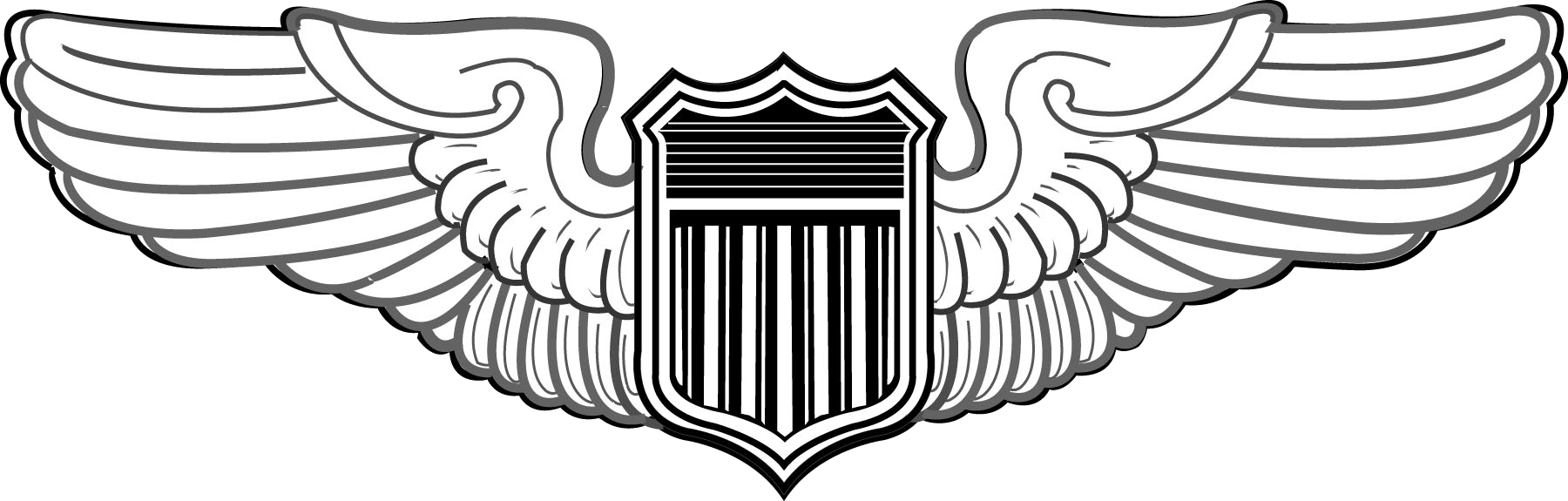
Pilot Badge

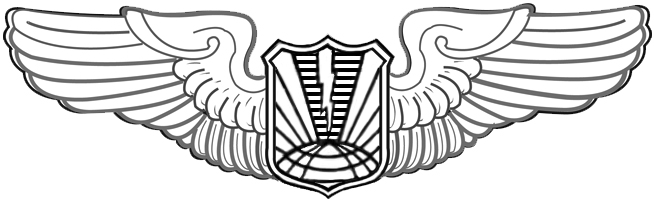
Remotely-Piloted Aircraft Pilot Badge

Navigator / Combat Systems Officer / Observer Badge

Air Battle Manager Badge

Flight Surgeon Badge

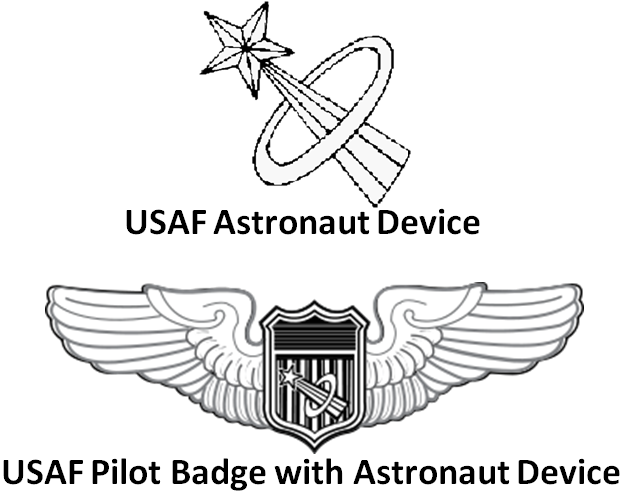
Astronaut Badge (Any Aeronautical Rating Badge with Astronaut Device)

=== Aircrew Badges ===
Flight Nurse Badge

Aircrew Badge (Officer)

Aircrew Badge (Enlisted)

== Occupational Badges ==
An Air Force Occupational Badge is a military badge of the United States Air Force which is awarded to those members of the Air Force community who are engaged in duties "other than flying". The purpose of the Air Force Occupational Badge is to denote and recognize training, education and qualifications received in a particular career field and to provide recognition in an outwardly displayed badge.

The first Air Force Occupational Badges began appearing on Air Force uniforms in the late 1950s. Prior to this time, the only Air Force badges authorized were the Pilot Badge and other aeronautical rating badges, such as the Navigator Badge and Flight Surgeon Badge.

=== Operations Career Group ===
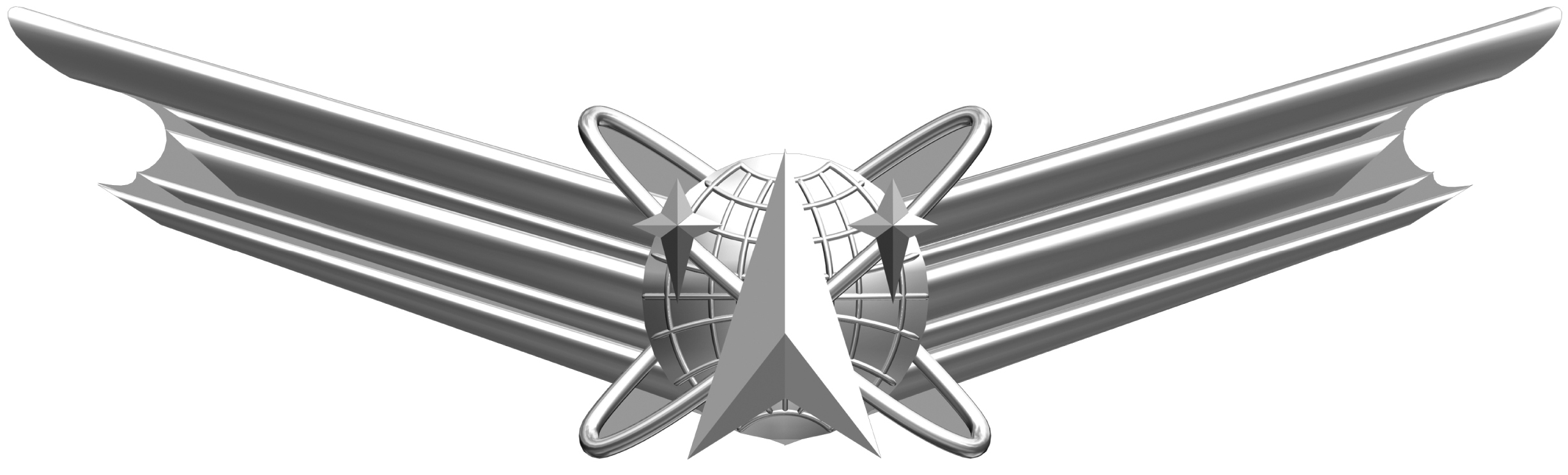
Space Operations Badge***

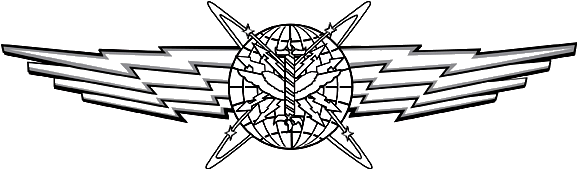
Cyberspace Operator Badge*

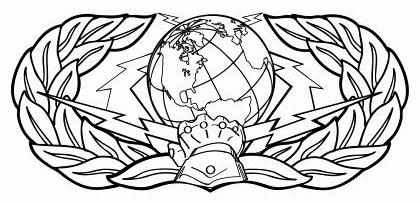
Cyber Defense Operations Badge(Enlisted)*

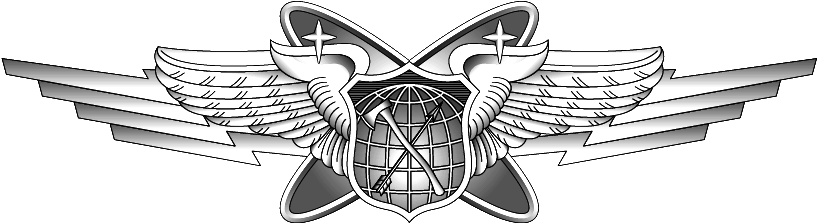
Multi-Domain Warfare Officer Badge*

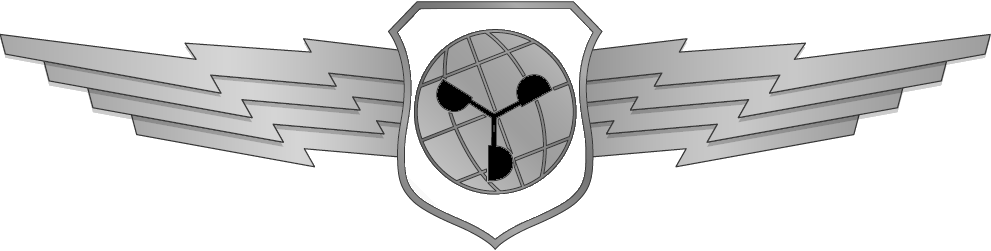
Weather and Environmental Sciences Officer Badge

Meteorologist Badge

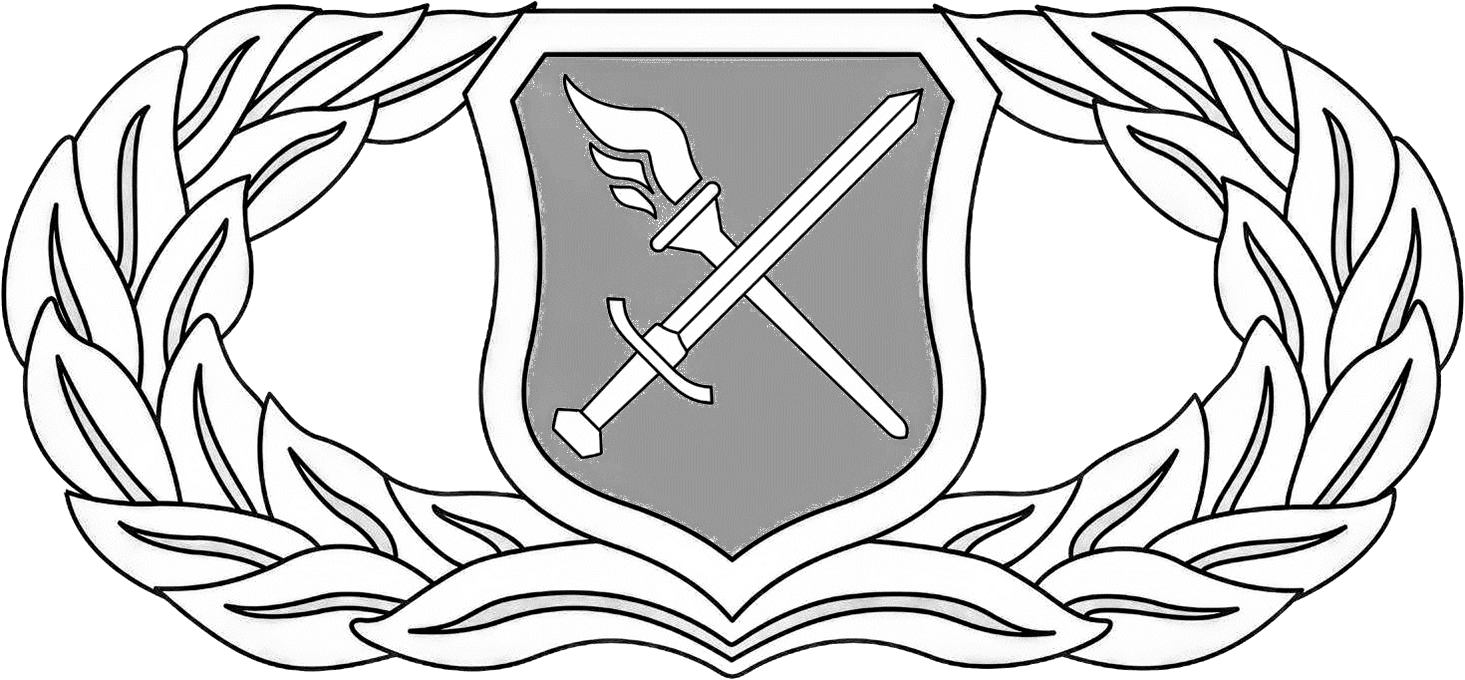
Operations Research Analyst Badge

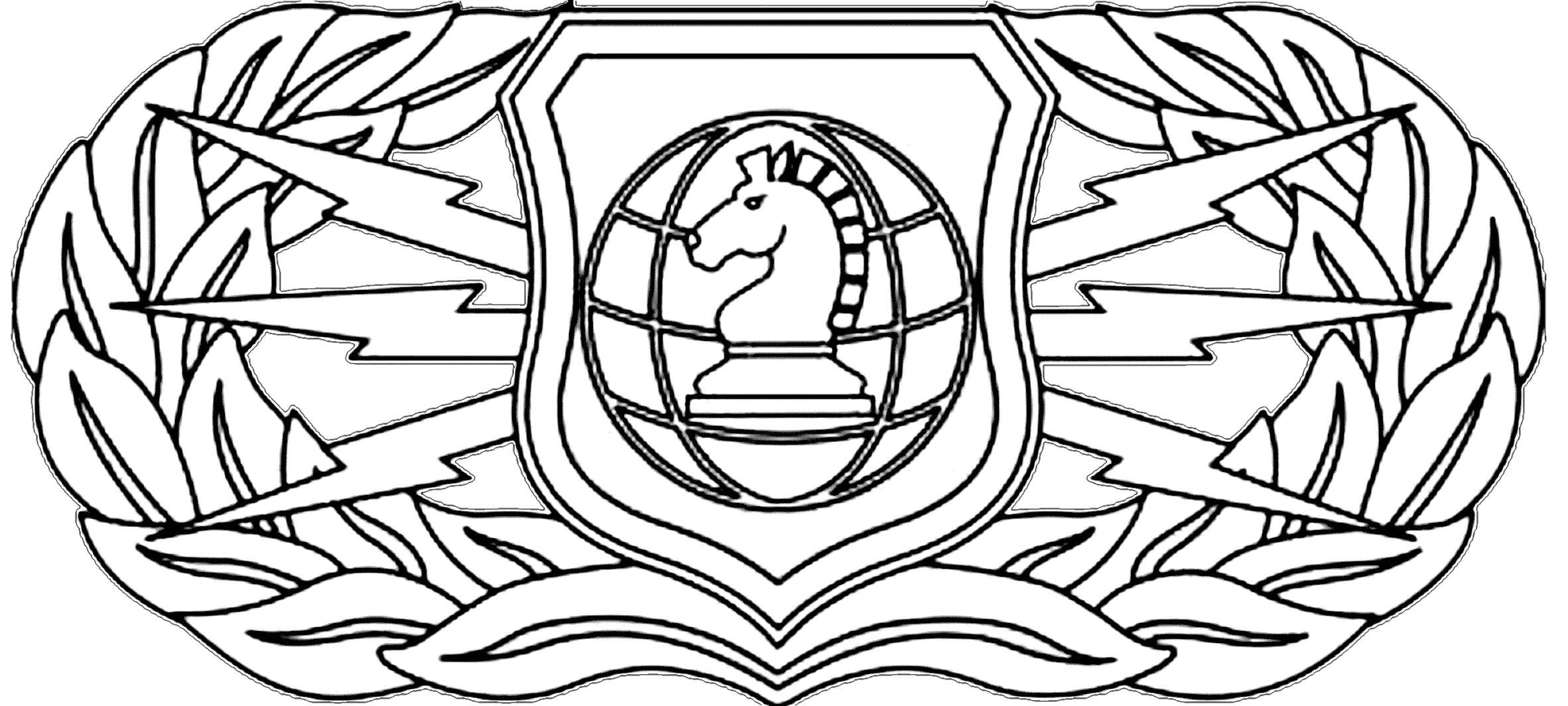
Information Operations Badge

Operations Support Badge

Command and Control Badge

Weapons Director Badge

Air Traffic Control Badge

Missile Operations Badge

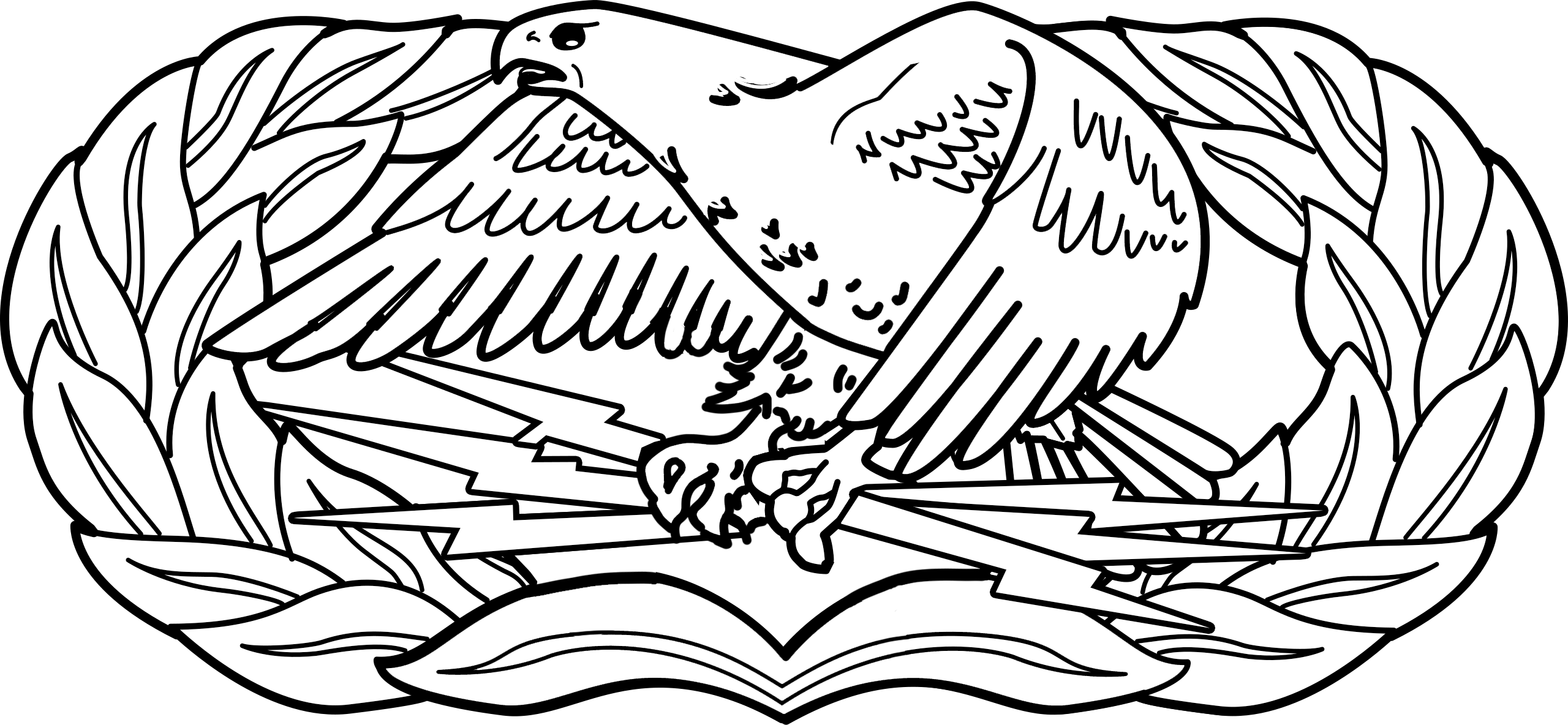
Radar, Airfield, & Weather Systems Badge

Intelligence Badge*

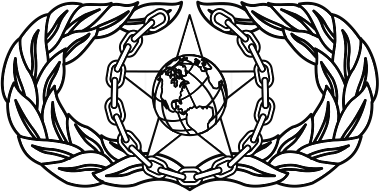
Safety Badge

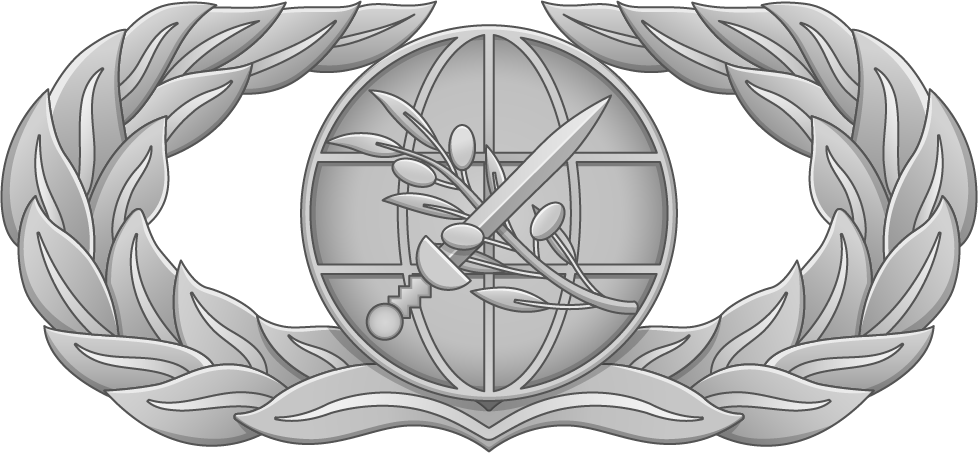
Foreign Area Officer Badge

The following operations insignia are worn as beret crests on specific Air Force berets instead of the left breast of Air Force uniforms. Both the breast insignia and the following beret crests signify the same thing, an Air Force specialty.

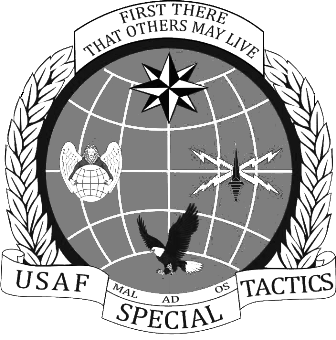
Special Tactics Officer Crest

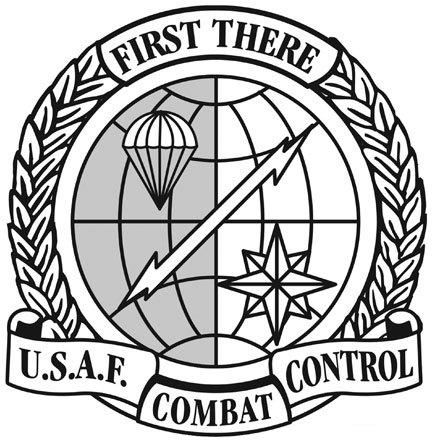
Combat Controller Crest

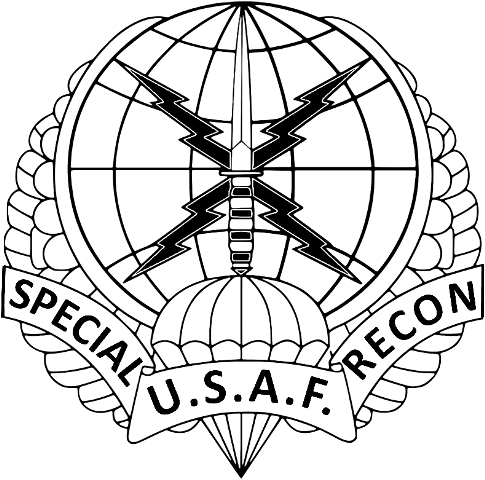
Special Reconnaissance Crest

Tactical Air Control Party Flash and Crest

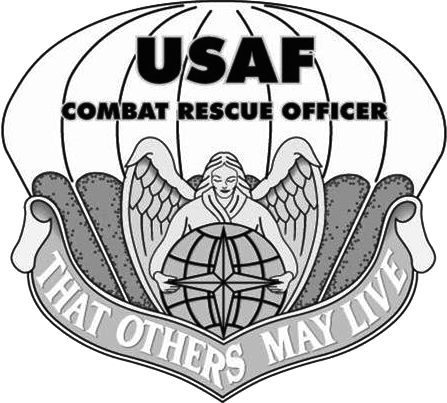
Combat Rescue Officer Crest

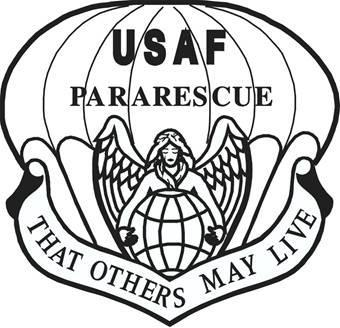
Pararescueman Crest

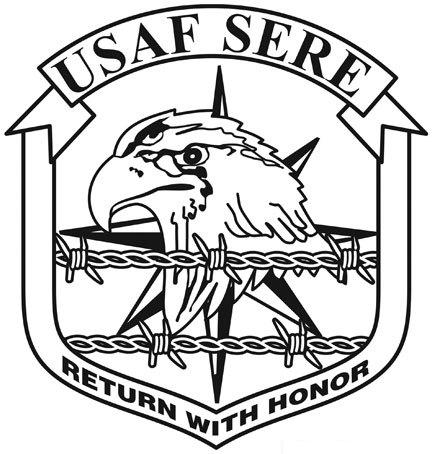
Survival, Evasion, Resistance and Escape Crest

=== Logistics Career Group ===
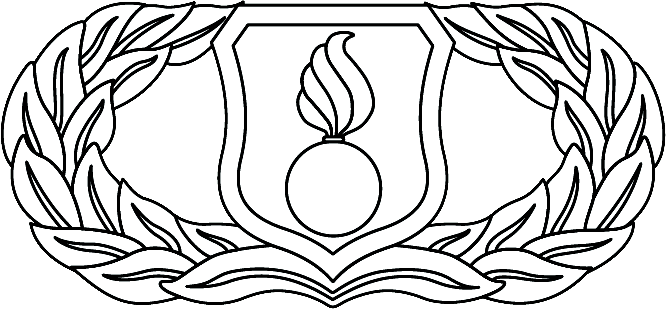
Munitions Badge

Maintenance Badge

Missile Maintenance Badge

Logistics Readiness Badge

Supply and Fuels Badge

Transportation Badge

Logistics Plans Badge

=== Support Career Group ===
Band Badge

Public Affairs Badge

Historian Badge

Human Resources & Administration (Enlisted)

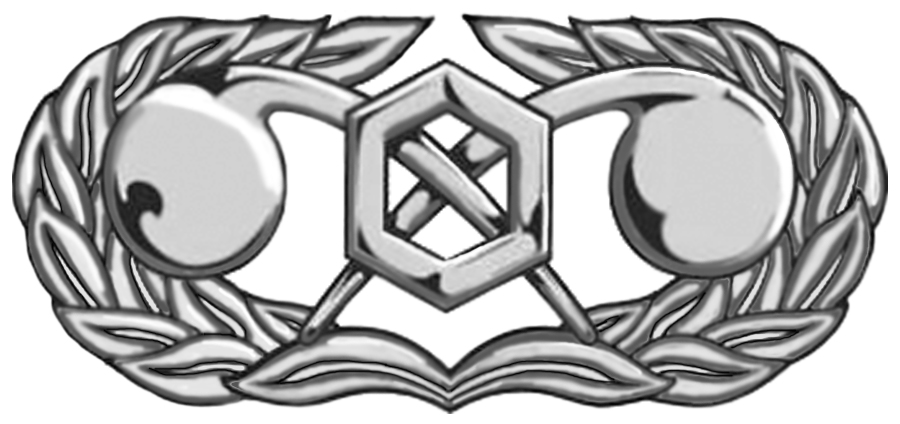
Emergency Management Badge

Civil Engineer Badge

Services Badge (Enlisted)

Force Support Badge (Officer)

Force Protection Badge

=== Professional Career Group ===
Judge Advocate Badge

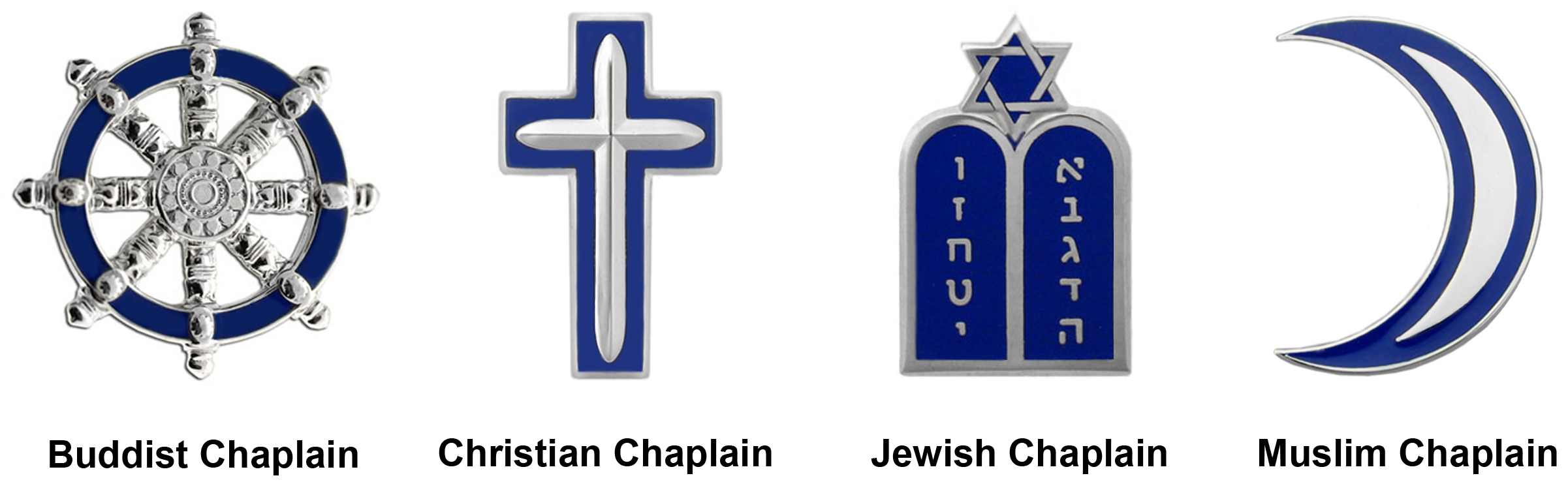
Chaplain Badges (These badges have precedence over all other badges and are mandatory to wear.)

Paralegal Badge (Enlisted)

Religious Affairs Airmen Badge (Enlisted)

=== Acquisition Career Group ===
Acquisition and Financial Management Badge*

=== Medical Career Group ===
Medical Corps Badge

Enlisted Medical Badge

Biomedical Science Corps Badge

Nurse Corps Badge

Dental Corps Badge

Medical Service Corps Badge

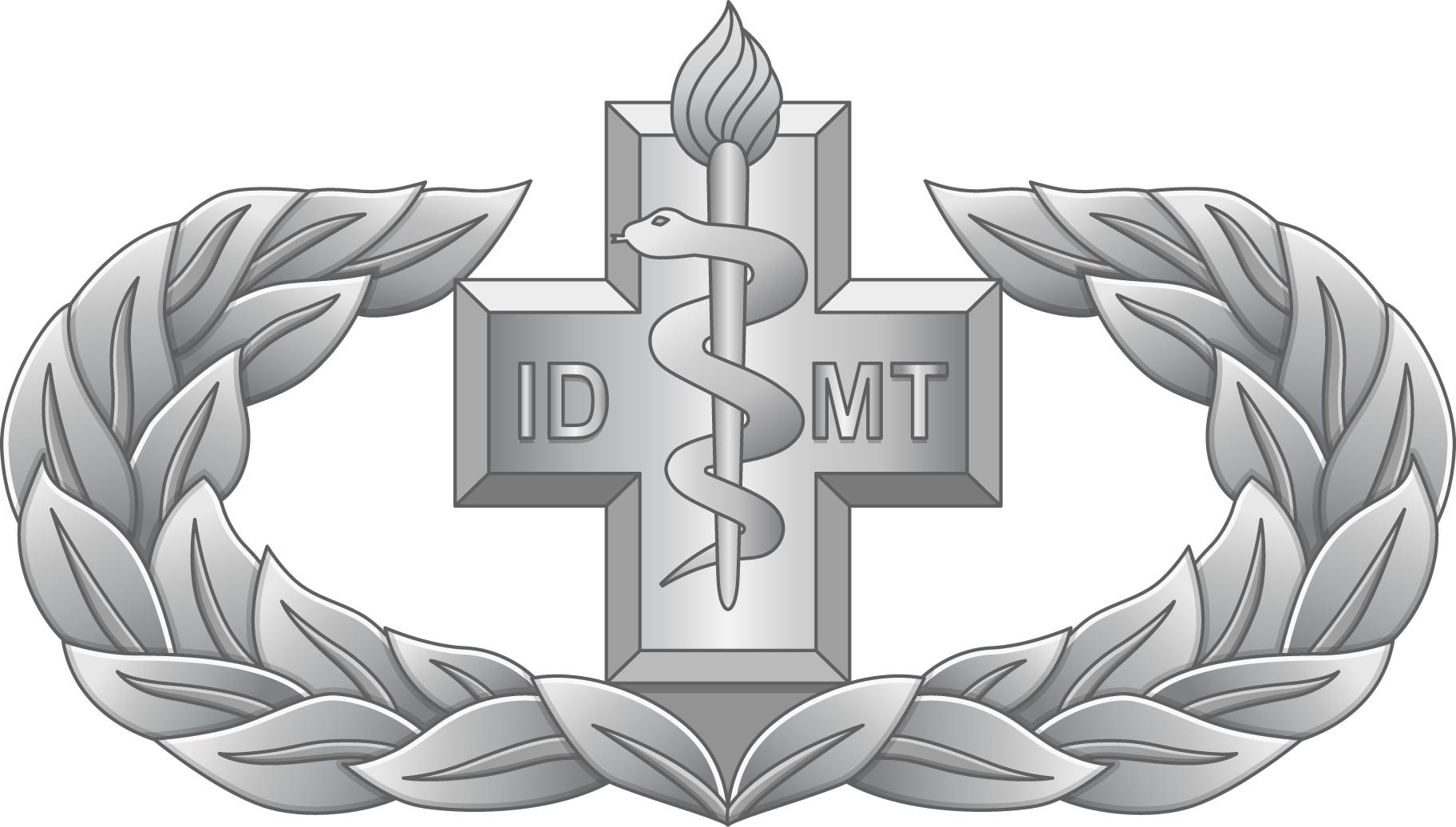
Independent Duty Medical Technician Badge

=== Reporting Identifiers ===
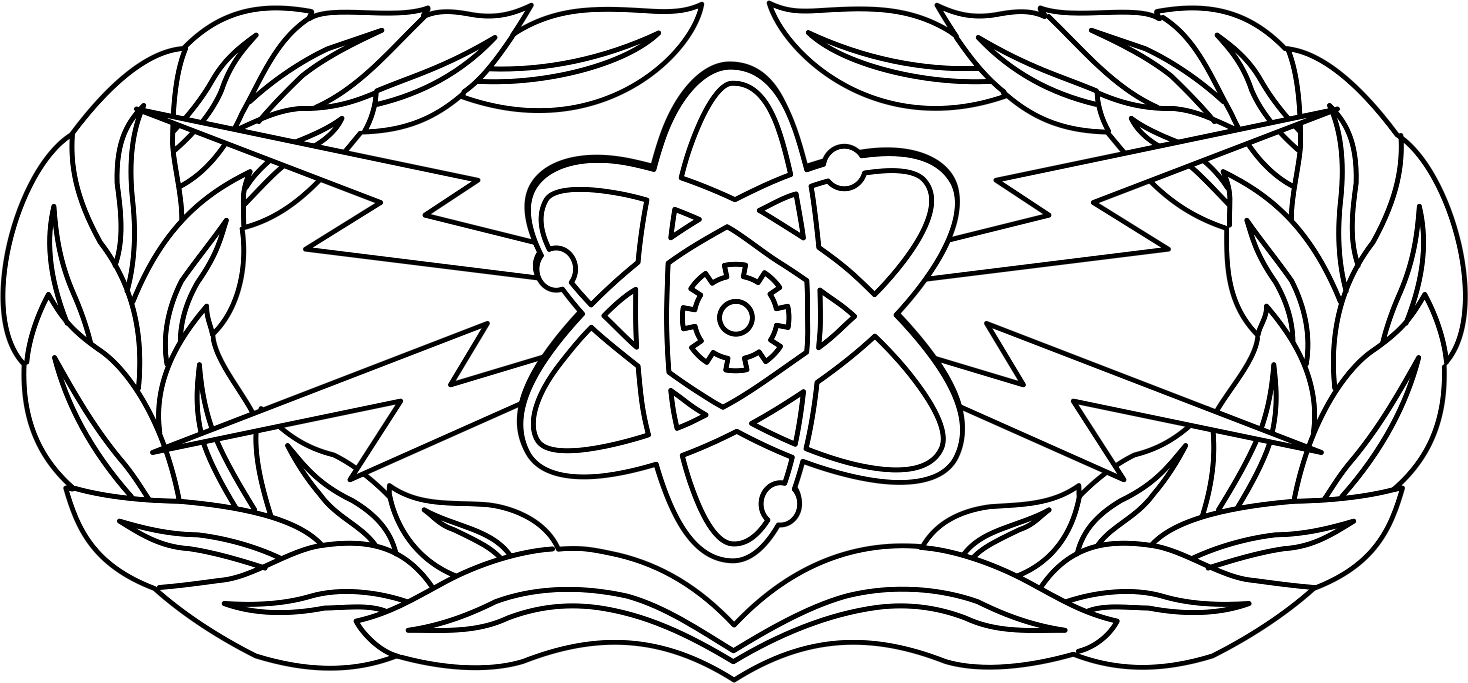
Scientific Applications Specialist Badge

== Miscellaneous Badges ==
As of 17 January 2014, Airmen are authorized to wear any qualification/skill badge they have earned on Air Force uniforms. With the exception of the new Air Force Combat Diver Badges, the other qualification badges listed in this section are specifically awarded by the Air Force as well as other armed services of the U.S. Department of Defense.

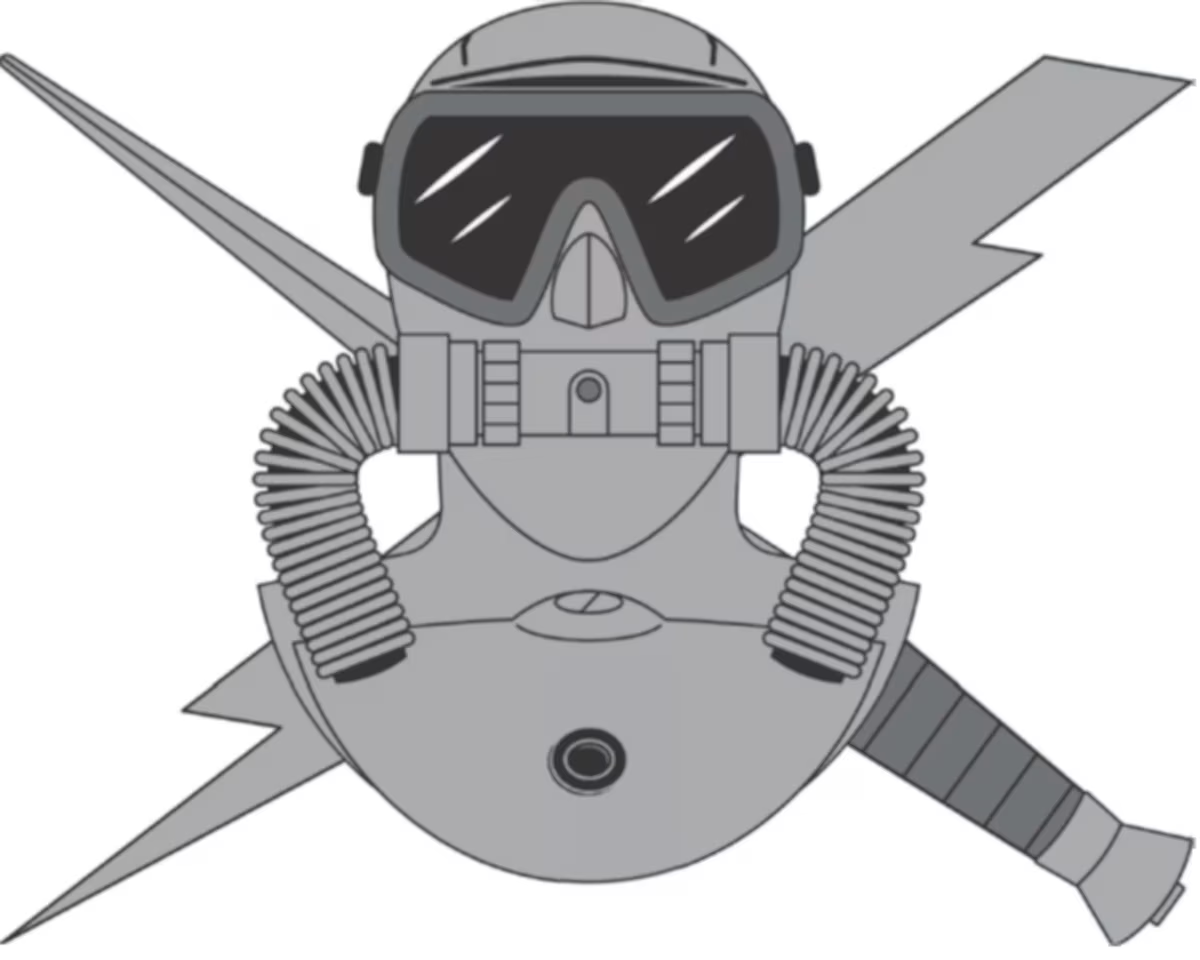
Air Force Combat Diver Badges (Basic and supervisor)

Explosive Ordnance Disposal Badges (Basic, Senior, and Master)**

Parachutist Badges (Basic, Senior, and Master)**

Freefall Parachutist Badges (Basic and Master)**

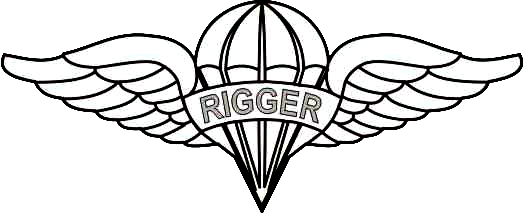
Parachute Rigger Badge**

== Duty Badges ==
Headquarters Air Force Badge

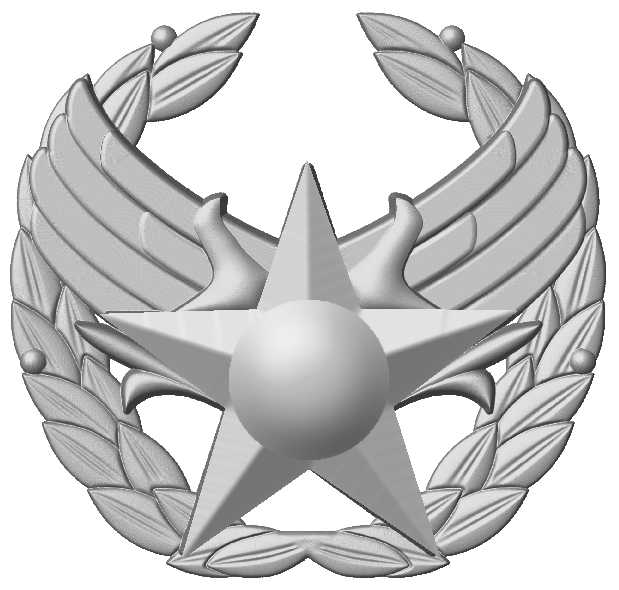
Commander's Insignia*

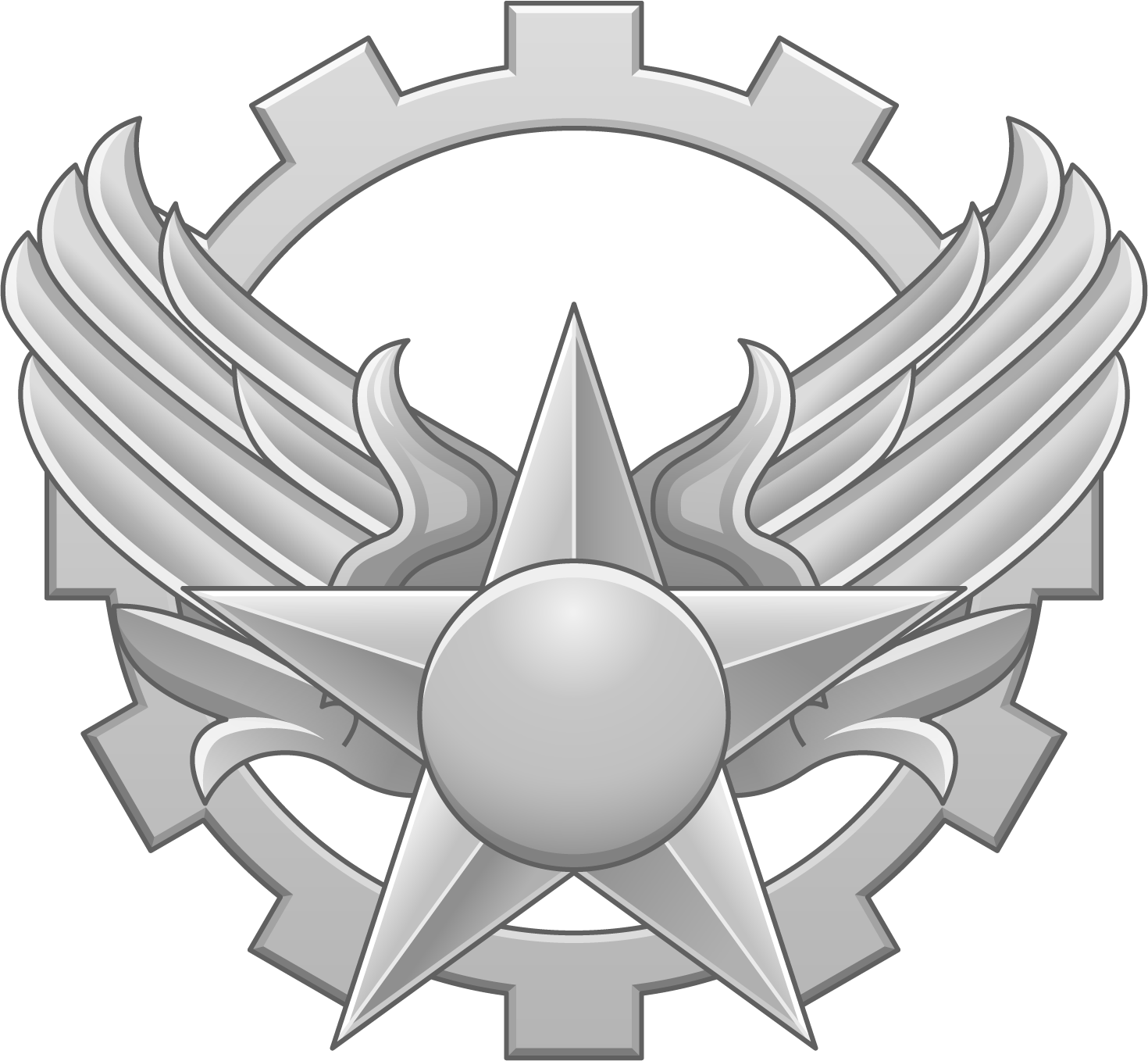
Materiel Leader Insignia

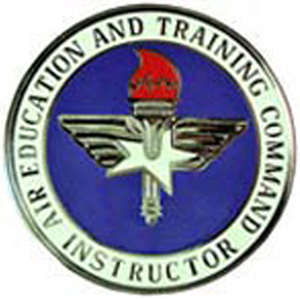
Air Education and Training Command Instructor Badges

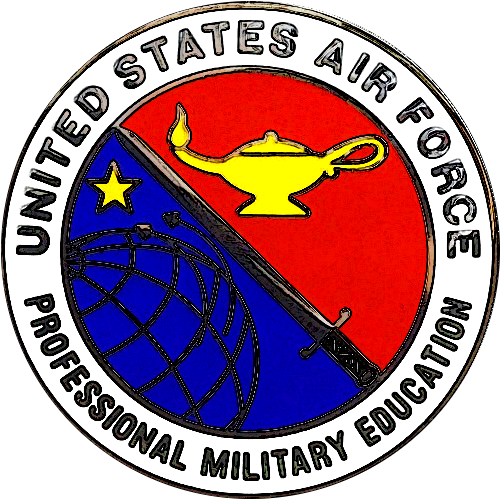
Air Force Professional Military Education Badge

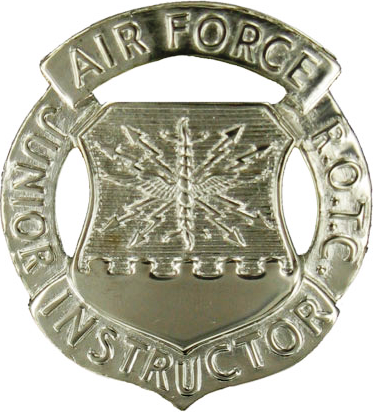
Air Force Junior Reserve Officers' Training Corps Instructor Badge

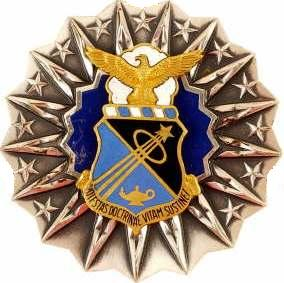
Permanent Professor USAF Academy Badge*

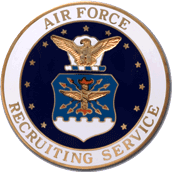
Air Force Recruiting Service Badges

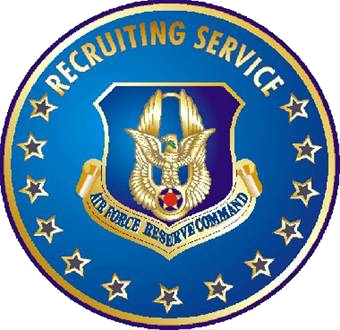
Air Force Reserve Recruiting Service Badges

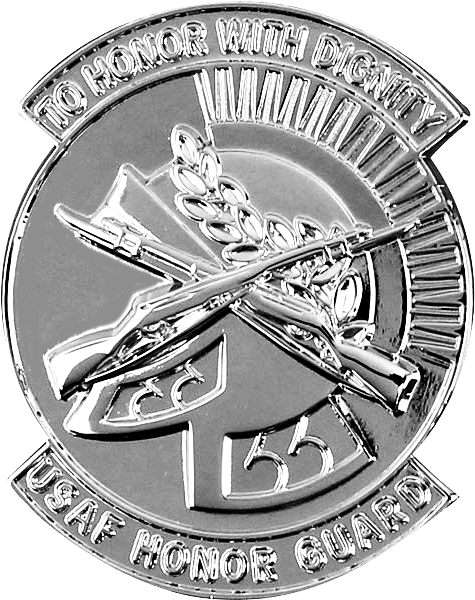
Air Force Honor Guard Badge

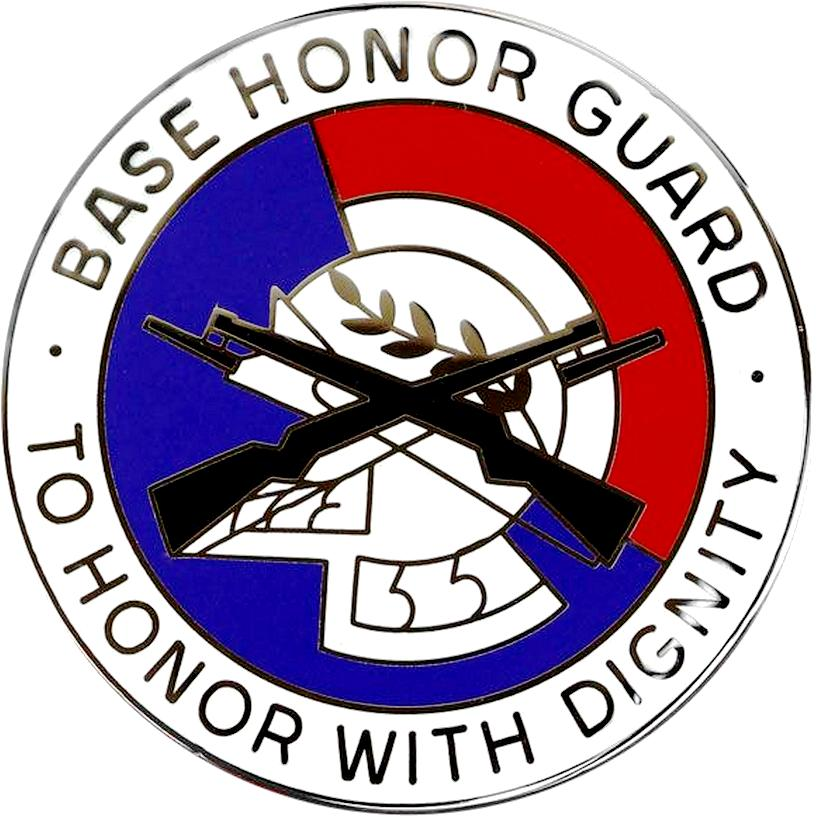
Air Force Base Honor Guard Badge

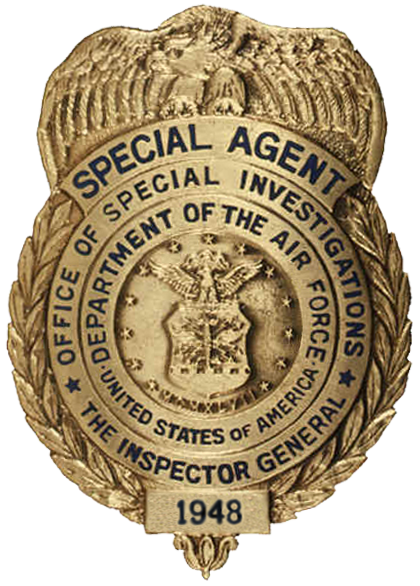
Air Force Special Agent Badge

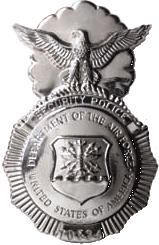
Security Forces Badge

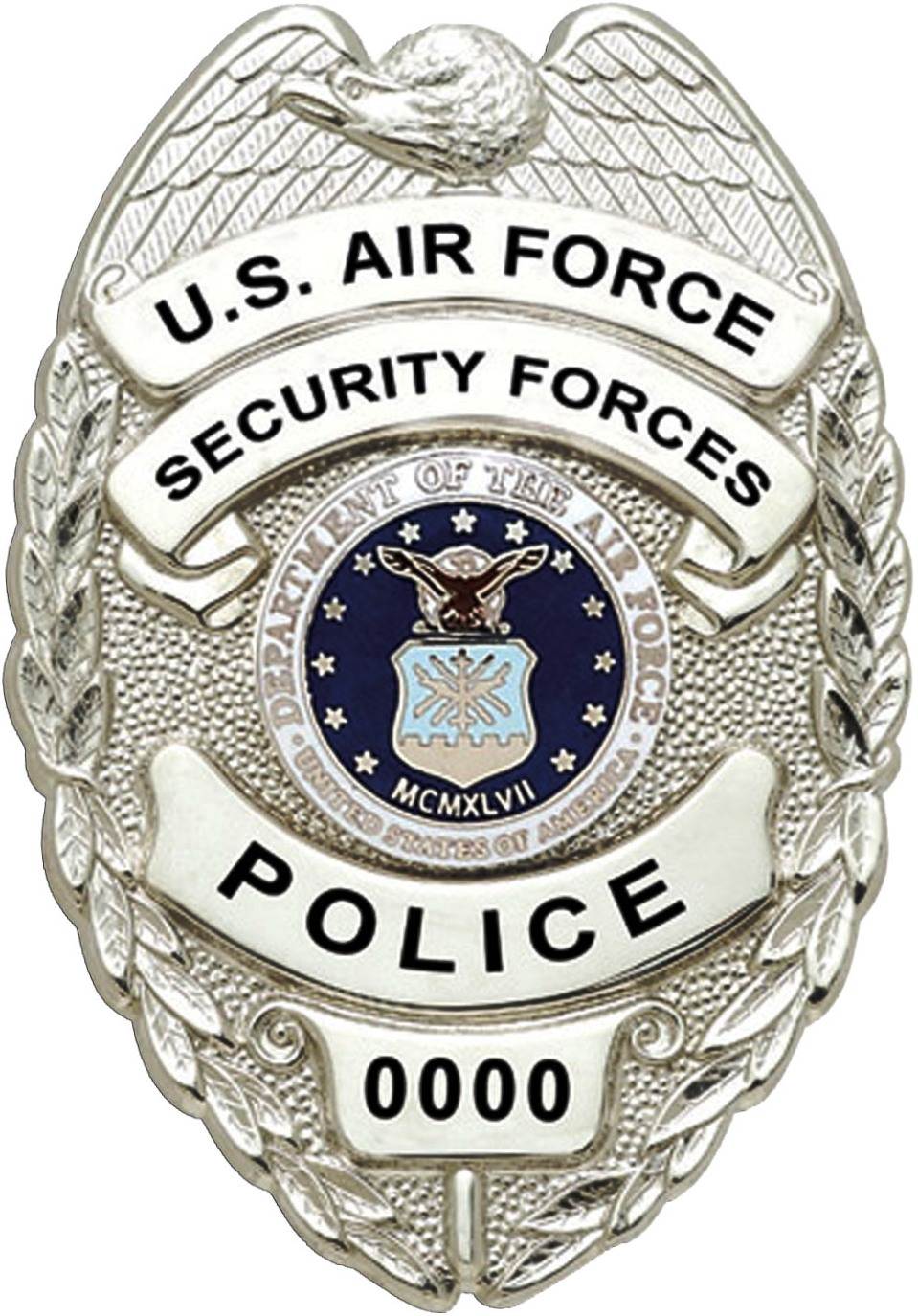
Department of the Air Force Law Enforcement Badges (Civilian)

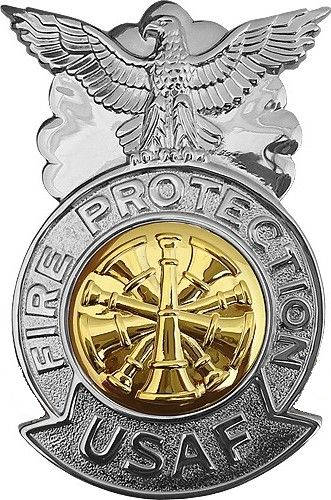
Fire Protection Badges

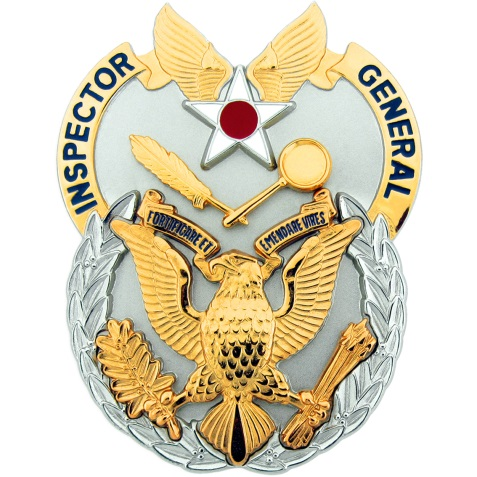
Air Force Inspector General Badge

=== Tabs and scrolls ===
Authorized identifier tabs (worn on upper–left sleeve of combat uniforms)
Duty/Qualification	Approved tab/patch
Advanced Air Advisor Tab (Authorized for permanent wear)	
Air Advisor Tab (Authorized for permanent wear)	
Arctic Tab (Authorized for permanent wear)	
Base Honor Guard - Dress Uniform	
Base Honor Guard	
Courier	
Evaluator	
Forward Area Refueling Point	
Instructor	
Master Instructor	
Raven	
Recruiter	
Survival, Evasion, Resistance and Escape	
Survival, Evasion, Resistance and Escape Specialist Scroll	
USAF Honor Guard - Dress Uniform	
USAF Honor Guard	

=== Duty identifier patches ===
Worn on the left shoulder of the service's Operational Camouflage Pattern uniform Patches with black borders indicate first responders and career fields that require quick identification
First Sergeant	Air Battle Manager	Airmen Dorm Leader	Aircrew Flight Equipment	Airfield Management	Aerospace Ground Equipment	Munitions Systems	Aircraft Maintenance	Aircraft Structural Maintenance	Air Traffic Control
Avionics	Aviation Resource Management	Battle Management Operations	All-Domain Comand & Control Operations	Chemical Biological Radiological Nuclear	Combat Control	Civil Engineer	Career Enlisted Aviator	Contracting	Combat Rescue Officer
Combat Systems	Cyber	Development Advisor	Pavements and Construction Equipment	Aircraft Electrical and Environmental	Aircrew Egress	Electrical Systems	Developmental Engineering	Engineering	Aerospace Propulsion
Pest Management	Equal Opportunity	Explosive Ordnance Duty	Electronic Warfare	Foreign Affairs	Fire Protection	Financial Management	Aircraft Fuel Systems	Ground Transport	Religious Affairs
Human Resources & Administration	HVAC & Refrigeration	Aircraft Hydraulic Systems	Independent Duty Medical Technician	Information Operations	Intelligence	Judge Advocate	Joint Air Component Coordination Element	Logistics Readiness	Missile Alert Facility Manager
Aircraft Mainenance	Medical Providers	Manpower	Aircraft Metals Technology	Munitions and Missile Maintenance	Maintenance Management	Navigator	Nondestructive Inspection	Operations Management	Operation Research
Special Investigations	Public Affairs	Aerospace Physiology	Pararescue	Logistics Plans	Professional Military Education	Precision Measurement Equipment Lab	Fuels	Air Transport	Electrical Power Production
Radar Airfield and Weather Systems	Scientific Utilization	Security Forces	Safety	Special Reconnaissance	Special Tactics	Stuctural	Materiel Management	Services	Tactical Air Control Party
Advanced Fighter Aircraft Avionics	Traffic Management	Education and Training	Unit Deployment Management	Vehicular Maintenance	Weather and Environmental Sciences	Water and Fuel Systems Management	Aircraft Armament Systems	Weapons Systems Evaluation	Weather

== Award badges ==
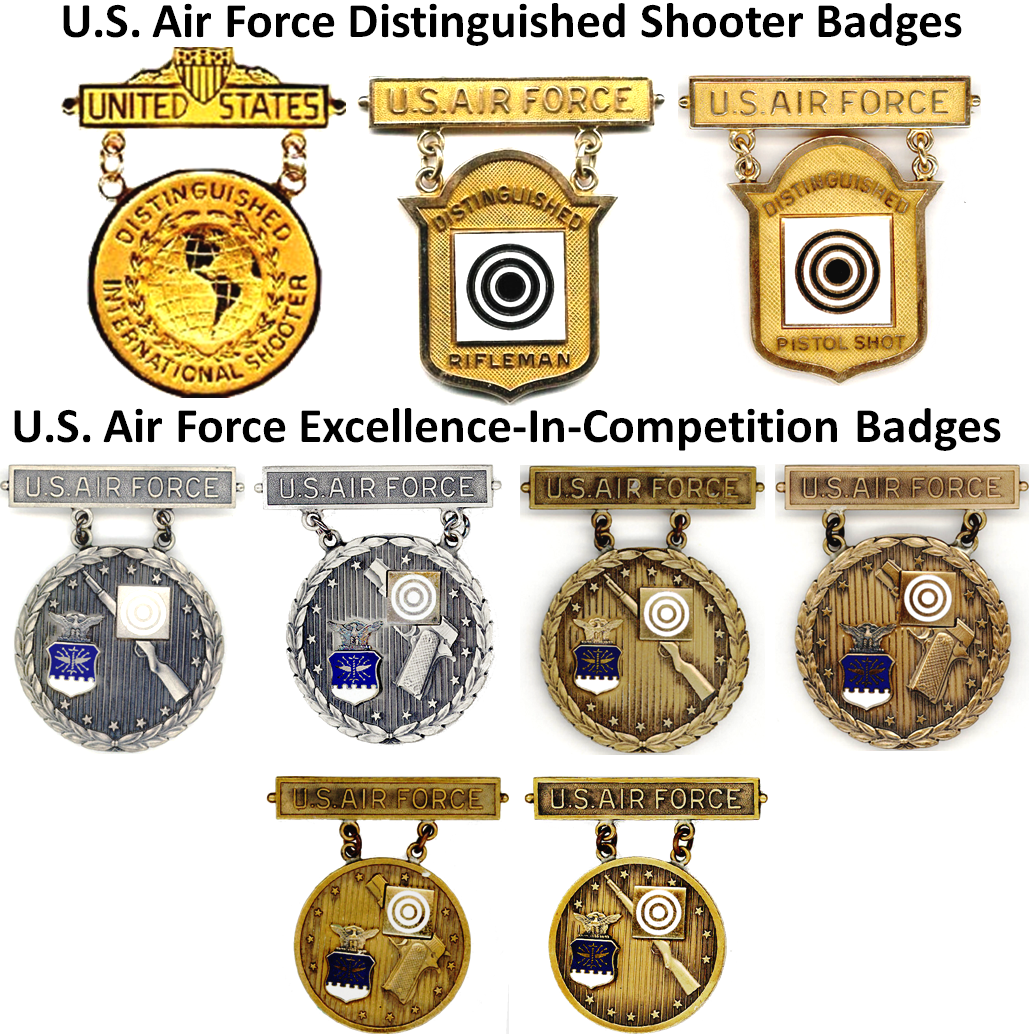
Air Force Marksmanship Competition Badges

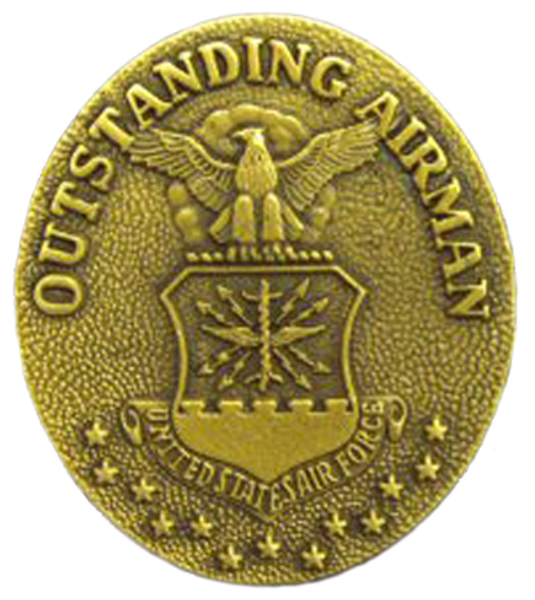
Outstanding Airman badge

== Air National Guard badges and tabs ==
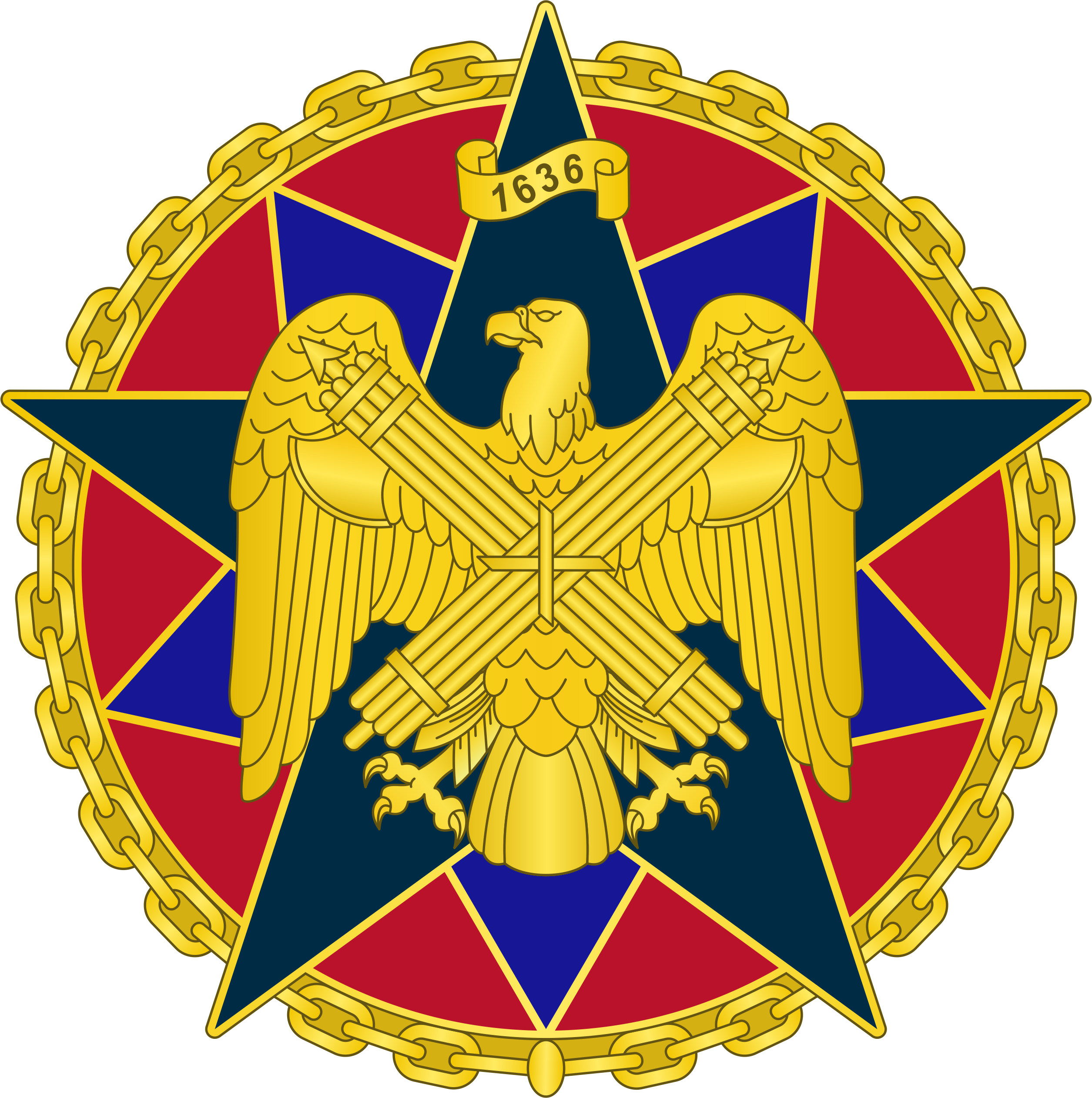
National Guard Bureau Organizational Badge**

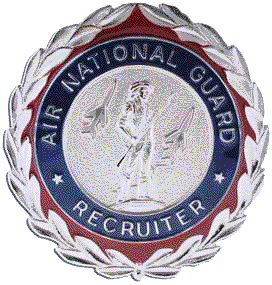
Air National Guard Recruiter Badges

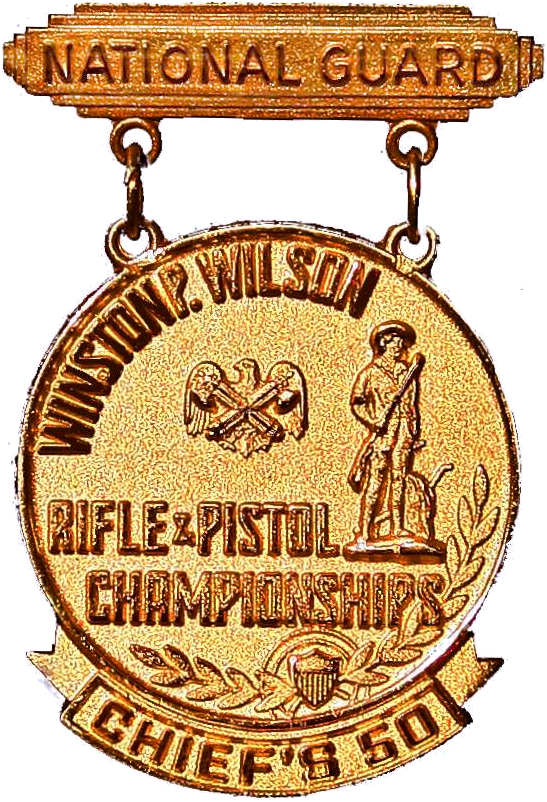
Chief's 50 Marksmanship Badge**

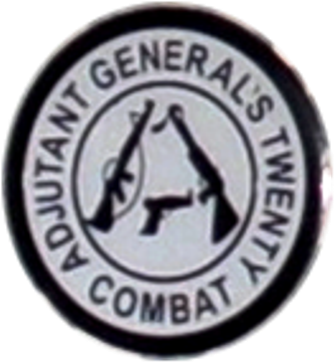
Adjutant General's Twenty Combat Badge (MO NG)

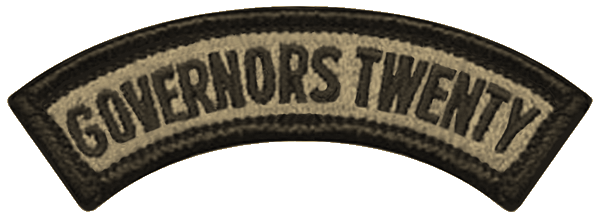
Governor's Twenty Tab

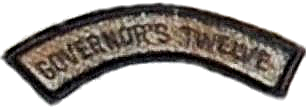
Governor's Twelve / Dozen Tab

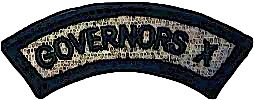
Governor's Ten Tab

== See also ==
- U.S. Air Force aeronautical rating
- Military badges of the United States
- Identification badges of the United States military
- Obsolete badges of the United States military
- United States military beret flash
- Air Force Specialty Code
- Uniforms of the United States Air Force

== Notes ==
- * = also issued to Space Force guardians
- ** = also issued to Army soldiers
- ***= also issued to guardians and soldiers
- No asterisk indicates that the badge is only issued to airmen
