= ABMB =

ABMB may refer to:

- Air Battle Manager Badge, a military badge
- "Always Be My Baby", a pop-R&B song
