= U.S. military instructor badges =

Badges to designate military trainers

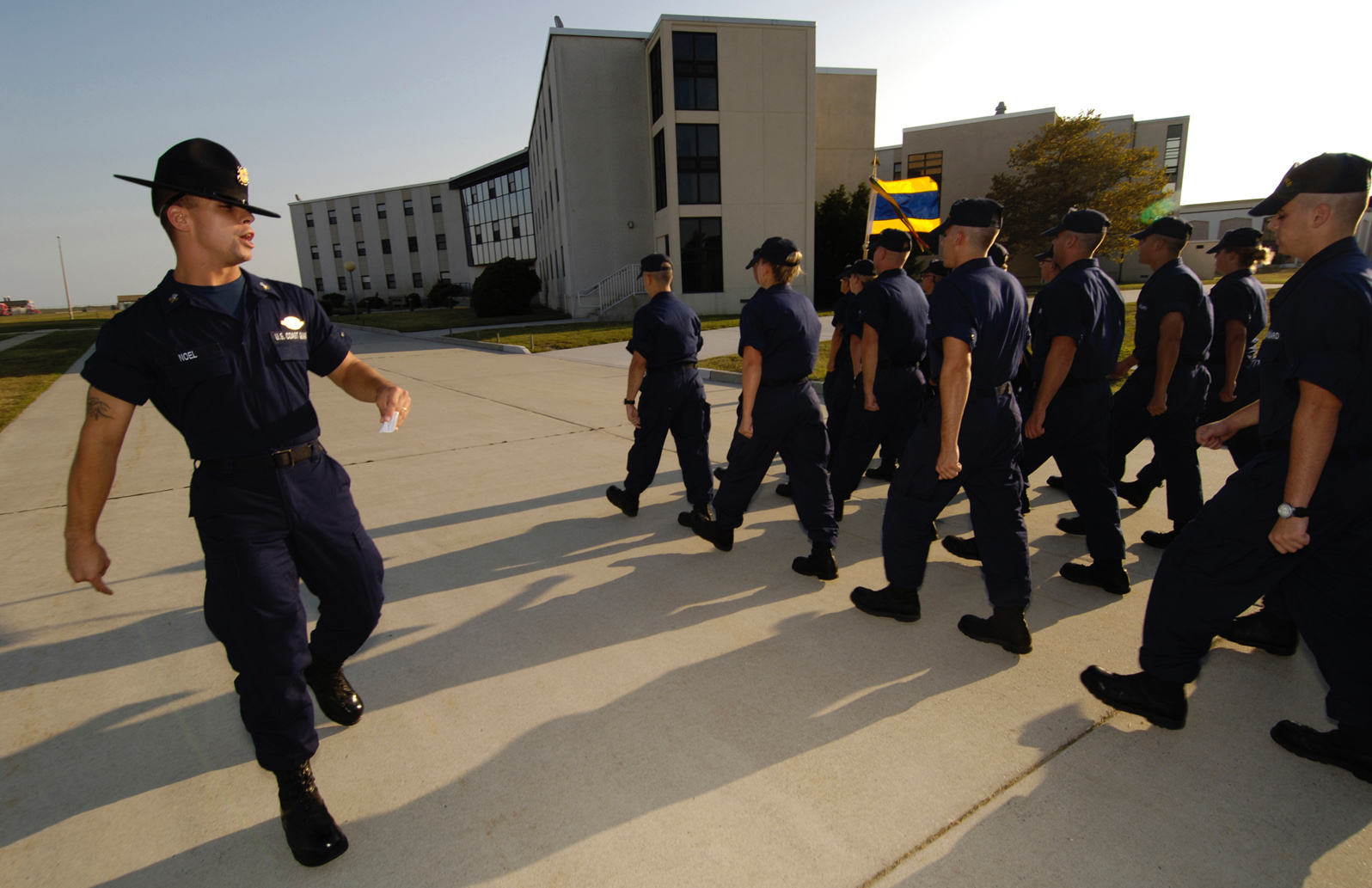
A U.S. Coast Guard Company Commander marches trainees—note the Company Commander Insignia over his service tape of the Operational Dress Uniform

The U.S. military issues instructor badges to specially training military personnel who are charged with teaching military recruits the skills they need to perform as members of the U.S. Armed Forces or teach continuing education courses for non-commissioned officers and officers in the military. With the exception of the U.S. Army and U.S. Coast Guard, these badges are considered temporary military decorations and must be surrendered upon completion of one's duty as a military instructor. Because of this, the U.S. Air Force, U.S. Navy and U.S. Marine Corps award Drill Instructor Ribbons as a permanent decoration to recognize service members who have qualified and performed as military instructors.

== Army Instructor Badges ==
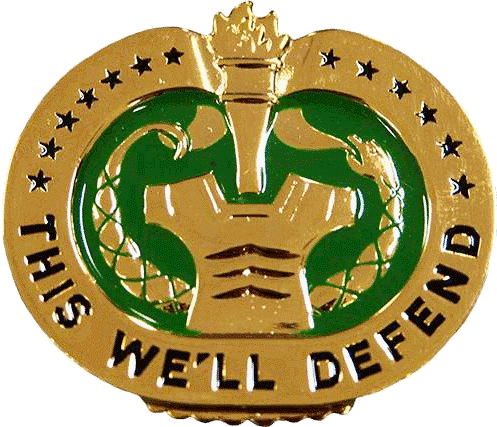
U.S. Army Drill Sergeant Identification Badge

The Drill Sergeant Identification Badge is a military badge of the United States Army which was first issued on January 15, 1958. It is also nicknamed the "pumpkin" patch due to its jack-o'-lantern-like appearance when worn in the non-subdued pin-on version and in the color sew-on version worn before insignia was subdued in the 1950s and 1960s. The badge is presented to any NCO who has completed the Drill Sergeant Course at any U.S. Army Drill Sergeant School, and has been assigned as a drill sergeant at a U.S. Army training command.

The drill sergeant identification badge is worn by all qualified drill sergeants. Each element of the badge has a specific meaning. It consists of 13 stars representing the original colonies. The torch, burning brightly, in the center symbolizes liberty. The snake is derived from the original ”Don’t Tread On Me” serpent on the Gadsden flag, a symbol of American independence during the 18th century. Together with the torch and breastplate, it indicated readiness to defend. The breastplate is a symbol of strength. The green background is a vestment worn under the breastplate. It's called a Jupon, which represents the new Army. The snake grasps, with his tail and teeth, a scroll inscribed “This We’ll Defend,” the motto of the United States Army. The inscription summarizes the meaning of all the symbols on the badge, depicting the determination, devotion, and constant readiness of the American soldier.

The Drill Sergeant Identification Badge (non-subdued) is worn on the lower right uniform pocket of the U.S. Army Class A uniform. On the Army Combat Uniform (ACU), the black subdued pin on version is worn centered on the ACU blouse pocket. The badge is authorized for wear upon successful completion of the Drill Sergeant Course. During this tour of duty the Drill Sergeant badge is considered a temporary decoration pending successful completion of the tour as a drill sergeant. The award is authorized by the Commandant of the Drill Sergeant School, and the Drill Sergeant Identification Badge may be worn for the duration of a military member's career, including commissioned service. Any drill sergeant who is relieved of drill sergeant duties for cause may be required to surrender the badge and in this case would not be eligible for any further display of the decoration.

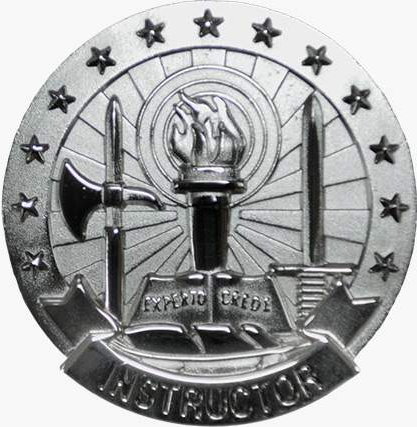
U.S. Army Instructor Identification Badge

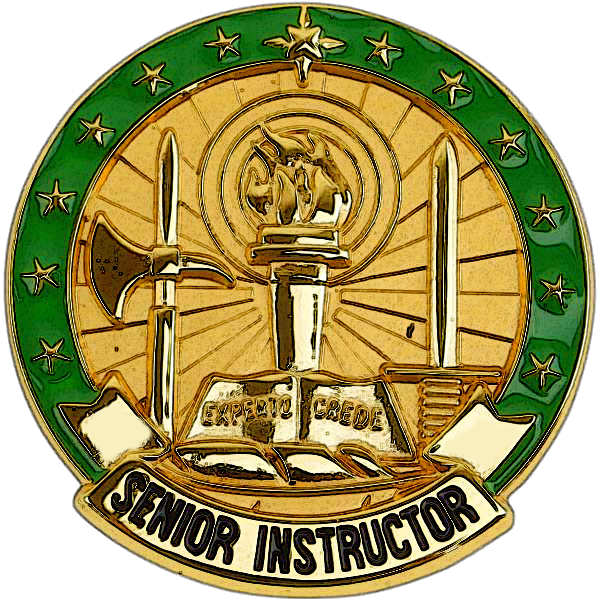
U.S. Army Senior Instructor Identification Badge

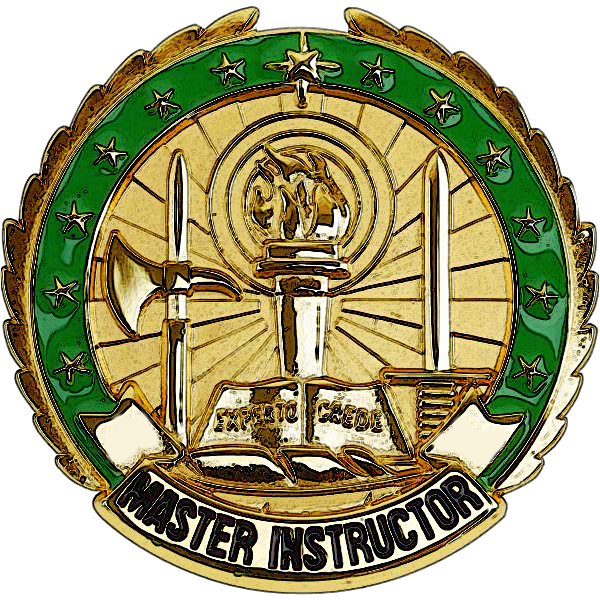
U.S. Army Master Instructor Identification Badge

In June 2014, the U.S. Army Training and Doctrine Command (TRADOC) implemented the Army Instructor Identification Badges. These badges are earned by certified noncommissioned officers who work as instructors within the Noncommissioned Officer Education System, but may also be awarded to commissioned officers. The Army Instructor Identification Badge system is designed to be part of the Instructor Development and Recognition Program (IDRP) and come with promotion points for pay grades E-5 and E-6. The introduction of these new badges help to "serve as a foundation on which the Army can promote instructor achievement through personal and professional growth, inspiring others to do the same," said MSG Elsi Inoa-Santos, IDRP Manager.

The Army Instructor Identification Badges are awarded in three levels; basic, senior, and master. To earn the basic badge a soldier must meet the instructor requirements outlined in Army Regulation 614–200, must complete the requirements of TRADOC Regulation 600–21, must complete 80 hours of instruction as a primary instructor, and must meet evaluation requirements after two separate evaluations 30 days apart. To earn the senior badge a soldier must meet the same requirements as the basic badge and complete the following prerequisites: graduate from the small group instructor training course/intermediate facilitation skills course and the systems approach to training basic course/foundation training developer course. They also must complete 200 hours of instruction as a primary instructor. To earn the master badge a soldier must complete the entire basic and senior badge requirements and complete the following prerequisites: graduate from the advanced facilitator skills course or the faculty development program-1 and the evaluating instructor's workshop. They also must meet evaluation requirements and master instructor board requirements outlined in TRADOC Regulation 600–21.

These badges can be worn on the Army Combat Uniform, as a subdued badge or patch, and the full-color versions on Army service uniforms. The Army Instructor Identification Badges are permanent awards and can be worn on Army uniforms for the remainder of a soldier's career.

== Air Force Instructor Badges ==
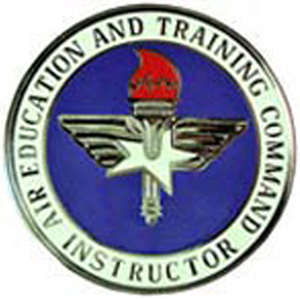
U.S. Air Force Air Education and Training Command Instructor Badge

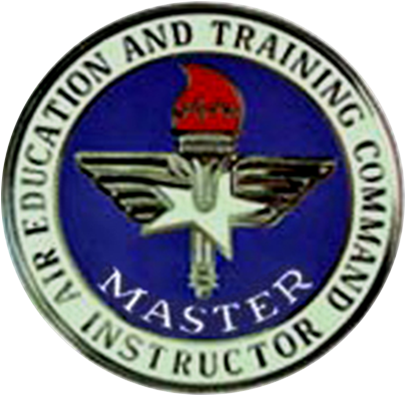
U.S. Air Force Air Education and Training Command Master Instructor Badge

The Air Education and Training Instructor Badge is a military badge of the United States Air Force which denotes a service member's status as an instructor assigned to the Air Education and Training Command. The Air Education and Training Instructor Badge is the Air Force equivalent to the U.S. Army's Drill Sergeant Identification Badge.

The Air Education and Training Instructor Badge may be awarded as a temporary decoration to any Air Force service member who has completed a course of instruction as a Military Training Instructor or Academic Instructor. The badge is then presented upon the service member's assignment to an Air Education and Training Command, such as basic training or Officer Training School. The badge is also occasionally granted to non-commissioned officers attached to Air Force Reserve Officer Training Corps units who serve as Cadet Drill Instructors.

Instructors who have completed the requirements for their applicable master instructor program may be awarded the Air Education and Training Master Instructor Badge. Physically, the only difference between these two badges is the incorporation of the word "MASTER" arched in silver below the torch within the blue field of the badge's shield.

Historical U.S. Air Force Instructor Badges

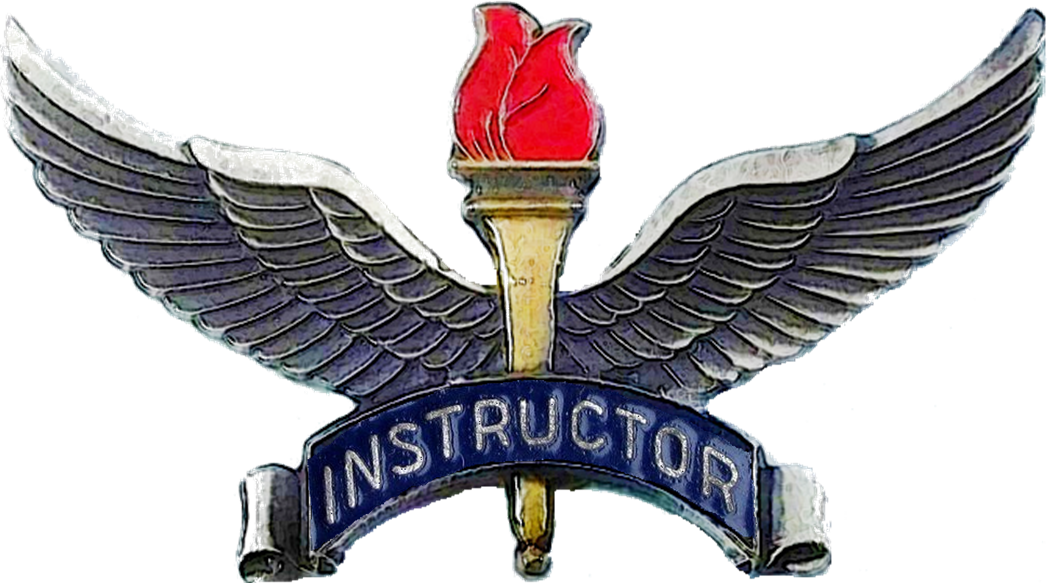
Training Instructor Badge

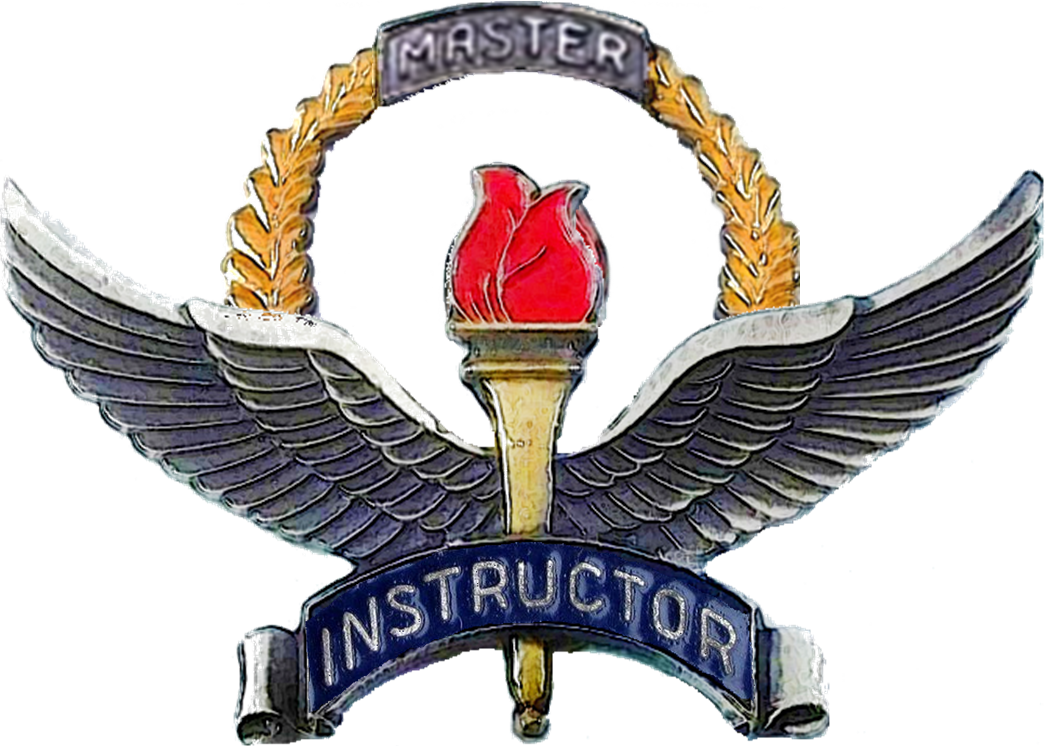
Master Training Instructor Badge

In the early years of the Air Force, a different insignia was used by the Air Training Command known as the Air Force Training Instructor Badge. This badge was issued in two degrees Training Instructor and Master Training Instructor. The badge prominently featured a gold torch with red flames flanked by large outwardly stretched silver wings; below the wings is a scroll that incorporated the word "INSTRUCTOR." For the Air Force Master Training Instructor Badge, a gold wreath that arched over the flame was added and incorporated a rocker with the word "MASTER." These badges were worn on the cap or over the right breast pocket of Air Force uniforms. It was eventually replaced by the Air Education and Training Instructor Badge and Air Education and Training Master Instructor Badge.

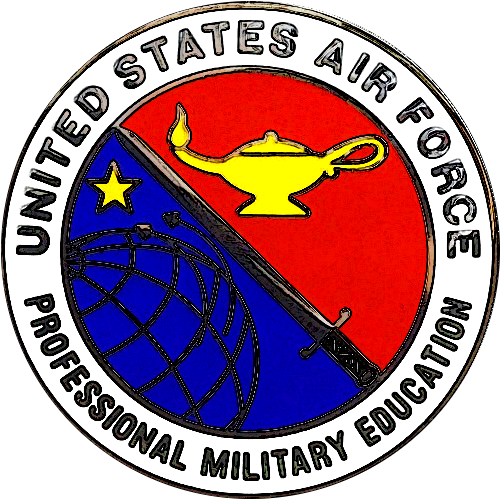
U.S. Air Force Professional Military Education Badge

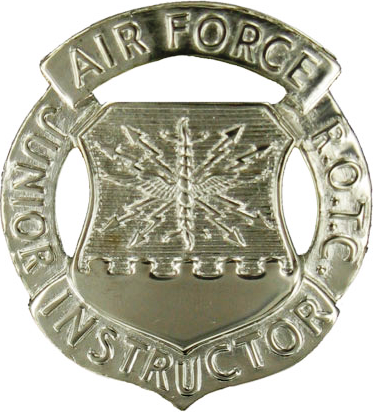
U.S. Air Force Junior Reserve Officers' Training Corps Instructor Badge

The Air Force Professional Military Education (PME) Badge is worn by Air Force instructors that provide continuing professional military education that is focused on basic, primary, intermediate, and senior level education of Air Force Officers. These PME instructors should not be confused with instructors that wear the Air Education and Training Instructor Badges, who focus on the professional education of new recruits, non-commissioned officers, and officer cadets/candidates. PME instructors focus on furthering the education of company and field grade officers to help further their careers and develop highly educated Air Force professionals through specialized graduate level courses accredited by Air University.

The Air Force also has an Air Force Junior Reserve Officers' Training Corps (AFJROTC) Instructor Badge, which is similar in design to the Air Force Commander's Insignia, that is worn by Air Force personnel assigned to AFJROTC units as instructors.

These badges served/serves as a duty identifier. Personnel who are no longer assigned to a wing or organization directly involved in training or education development may continue wearing these badges. However, duty badges of current assignments take precedence.

== Navy Recruit Division Commander Badges ==
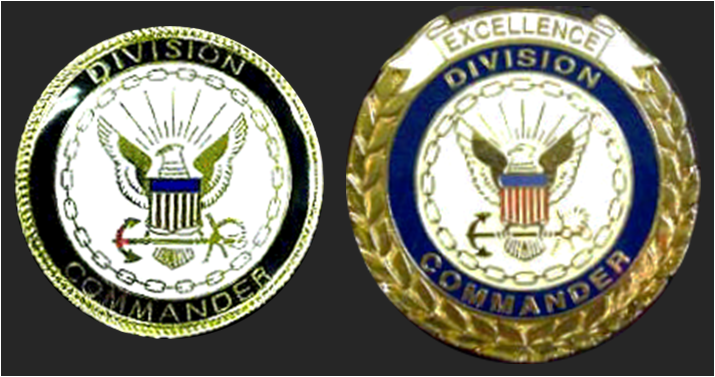
Left: U.S. Navy Recruit Division Commander Badge Right: Recruit Division Commander Badge with Gold Wreath Award

The United States Navy equivalent of the Army's Drill Sergeant Identification Badge is the Recruit Division Commander Badge. As with Army Drill Sergeants, Division Commanders are responsible for basic military training of U.S. Navy recruits. For outstanding performance as a Division Commander, the Recruit Division Commander Badge can be upgraded with the Gold Wreath Award.

The Recruit Division Commander Badge is designed with a gold rope bordering the badge with a black band inside the gold rope which is embossed in gold lettering with the words "Division Commander". The center contains an eagle design, similar to the Bureau of Naval Personnel Seal, on a white background encircled by gold link. The Gold Wreath Award version has a gold wreath that replaces the gold rope which has a white scroll at the top of the wreath with the word "Excellence" embossed in gold. Inside the gold wreath is the same Division Commander Badge described above.

The Division Commander badge is considered a temporary badge that must be surrendered upon completion of an instructor's training assignment.

== Coast Guard Company Commander Insignia ==
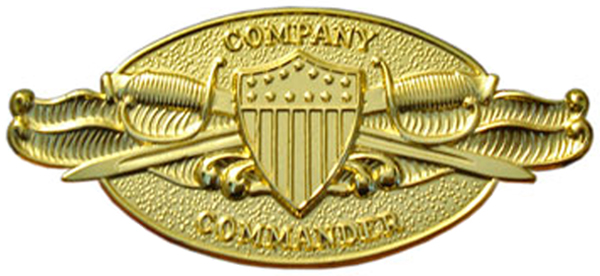
U.S. Coast Guard Company Commander Insignia

The United States Coast Guard equivalent of the U.S. Army's Drill Sergeant Identification Badge is known as the Company Commander Insignia, which is a gold badge, similar to other Coast Guard qualification insignia, that's awarded to qualified drill instructors as a permanent decoration/skill badge. As with Army Drill Sergeants, Coast Guard Company Commanders are responsible for basic military training of Coast Guard recruits. When Coast Guard Company Commanders are not assigned to instructor positions, they are relied on as experts in drill, ceremony, and physical fitness training.

The Company Commander Insignia is a permanent decoration and may be worn for the remainder of the Coast Guardsman's military career.

== See also ==
- Badges of the United States Army
- Badges of the United States Marine Corps
- Badges of the United States Navy
- Badges of the United States Air Force
- Badges of the United States Space Force
- Badges of the United States Coast Guard
- Drill Instructor Ribbon
- Drill instructor
