= Multi-Domain Warfare Officer =

Multi-Domain Warfare Officer was a qualification of the US Air Force beginning in June 2018. Chief of Staff of the Air Force, Gen. David L. Goldfein directed the creation of this specialty and more than 150 officers completed the course. In 2022, Chief of Staff of the Air Force, Gen. C.Q. Brown called for the specialty to be ended after only three years, while expanding the concept of multi-domain warfare to the entire officer corps, he said then, “To continue outpacing near-peer adversaries, we must reinforce all Air Force members’ multi-domain expertise.”

== Interim Officer Training Course Badge ==
On August 28, 2025, the badge was reused as the United States Space Force interim Space Force Officer Training Course (OTC) graduation badge when the first ever Guardian Officer Training Course class completed their training at Peterson Space Force Base. It was announced at that time that a permanent design for the badge would be announced in the future. Chief of Space Operations Gen. B. Chance Saltzman said, "We had a career field that was abandoned by the Air Force called multi-domain warfare officer. And I said, ‘Well, we’re training space and cyber. How is this not a multi-domain warfare officer?” The Space Force had announced on August 5, 2025 that they were moving away from the U.S. Air Force Space Operations Badge and that the first OTC class would not be awarded that badge, but a badge that would represent the completion of OTC.

== Badge ==
The badge contains a multitude of symbols beginning in the back with the cyber wings; atop those are flight wings; above and below are orbital rings representing the space domain; finally the front of the badge features a shield containing a globe with crossed axe and arrow - symbols of the Greek hero Odysseus. The first Multi-Domain Warfare Operators class highest academic student was awarded The Odysseus Leadership Award.

The badge was originally to be issued in basic, senior and master, but since the career field only lasted for three years - it is likely that very few earned more than the basic badge as officers generally require seven years to earn the senior badge.

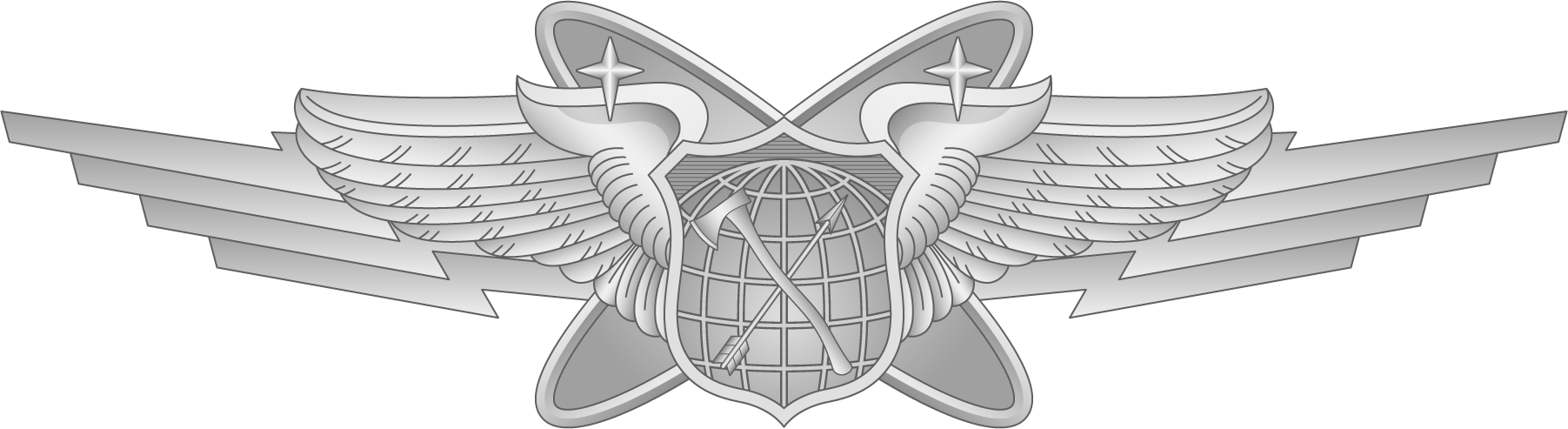
USAF Multi-Domain Warfare Officer Basic

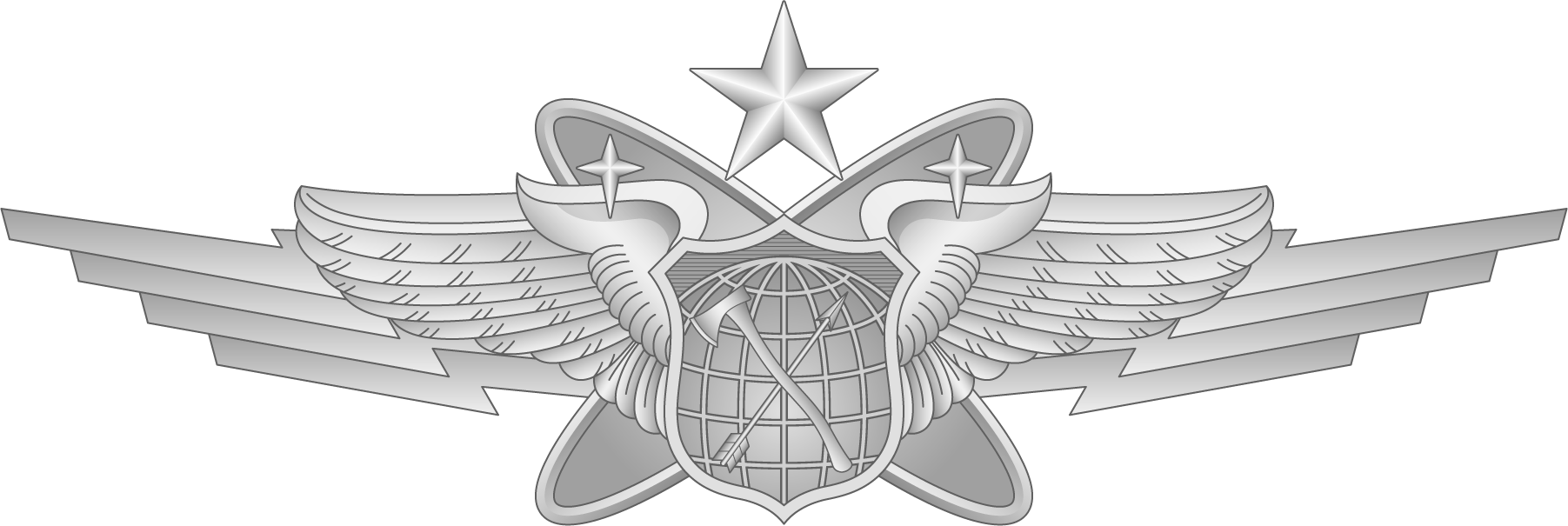
USAF Multi-Domain Warfare Officer Senior

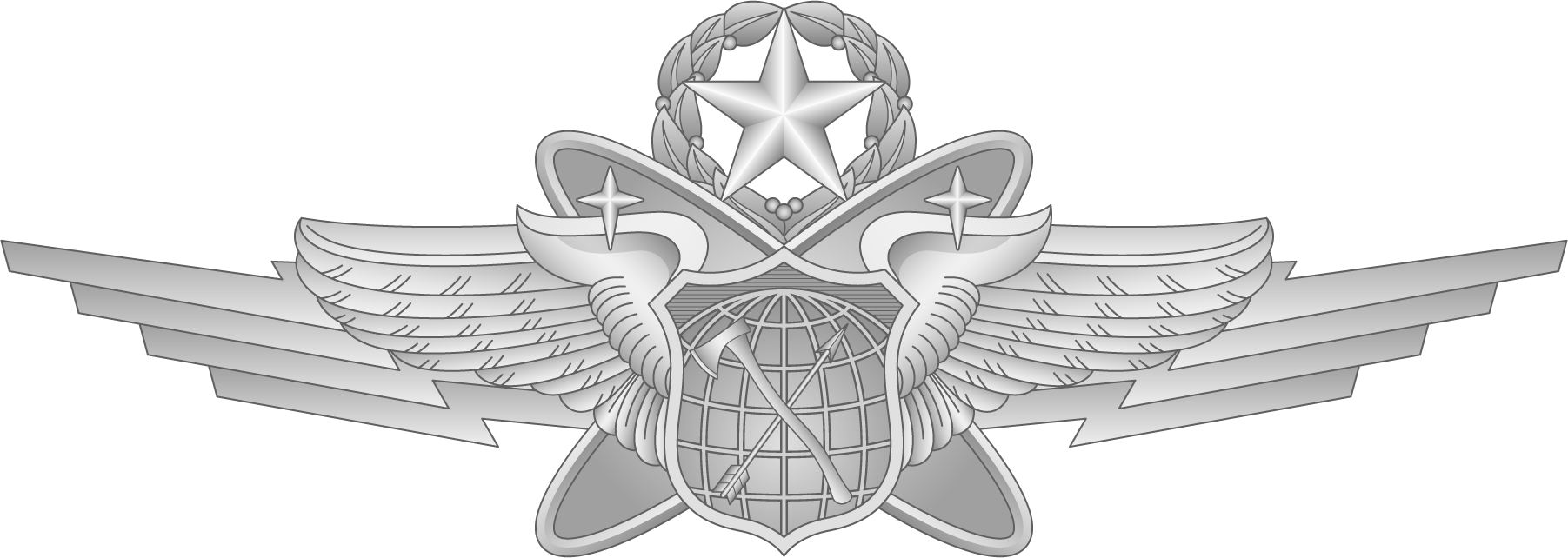
USAF Multi-Domain Warfare Officer Master
