= United States Air Force Honor Guard Badge =

U.S. Air Force Honor Guard Badges

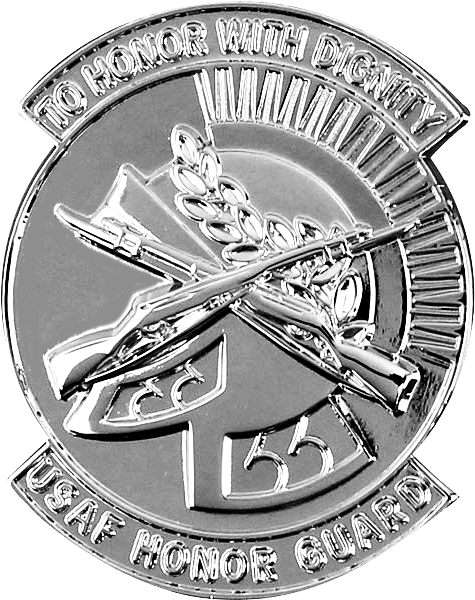
Honor Guard Badge

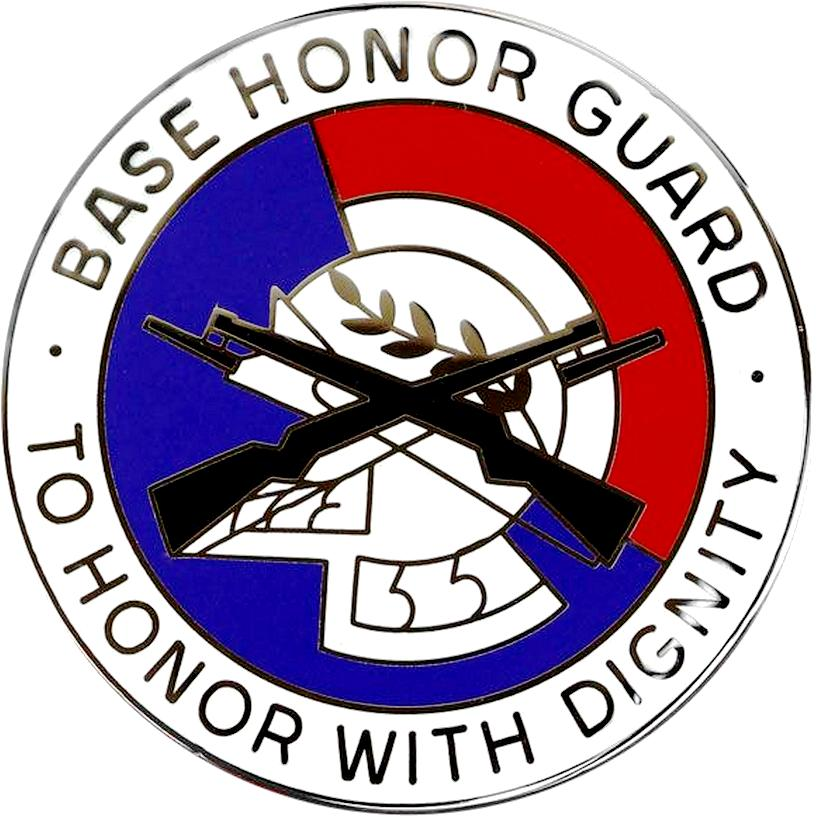
Base Honor Guard Badge

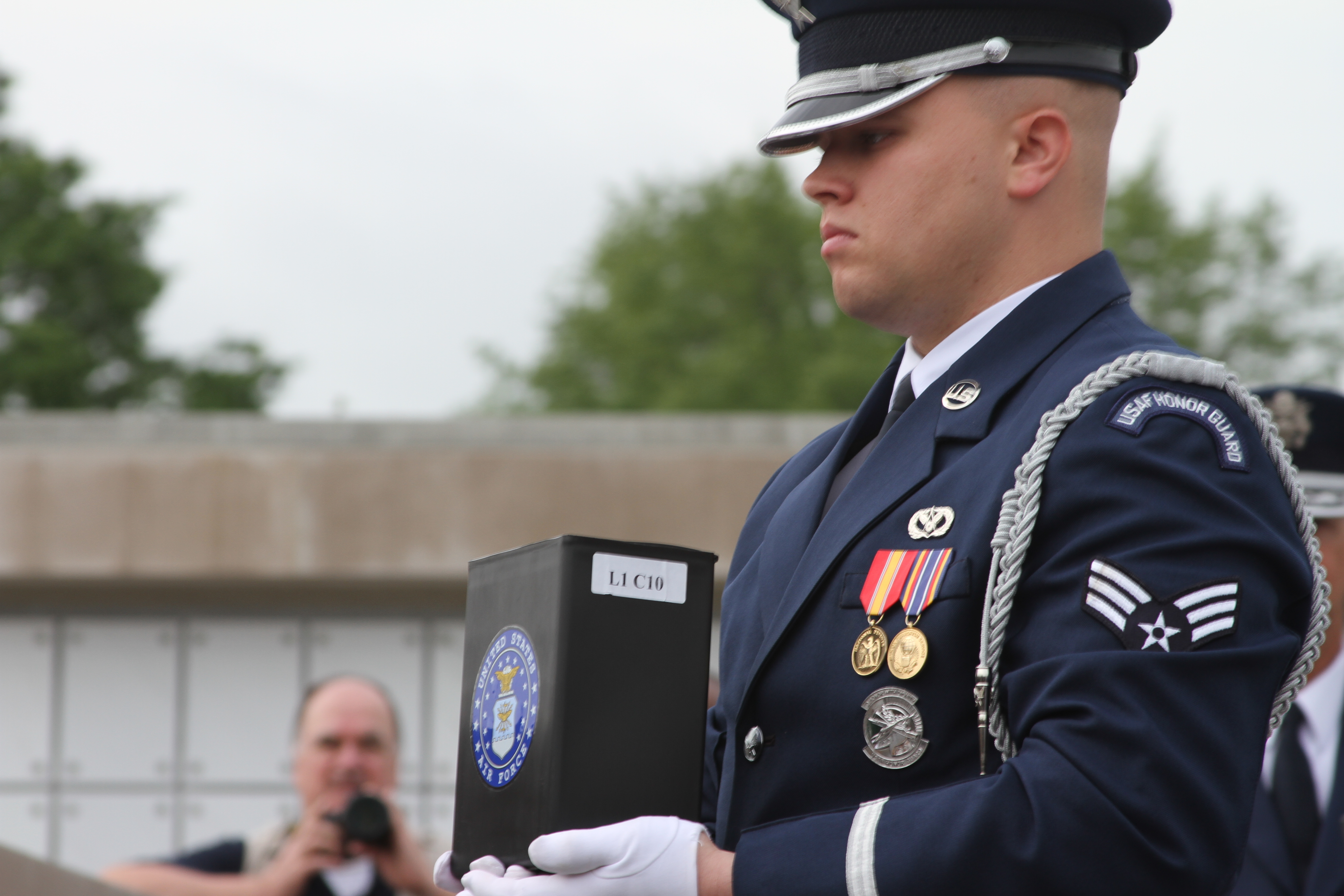
A U.S. Air Force honor guard member takes the remains of SSgt Dennis Banks to a niche at Arlington National Cemetery

The United States Air Force Honor Guard Badge is a military badge of the United States Air Force that is authorized for wear by all personnel who are assigned to the United States Air Force Honor Guard (USAF HG), or to active members of a Base Honor Guard (BHG). For males, the badge is worn as a decoration centered on the left uniform pocket, below standard awards and decorations. For females, it is worn on the right side, even with the bottom of their decorations.

The badge is derived from the emblem of the USAF Honor Guard that was created in 1976 by Malcolm Haynes. It is composed of crossed M1 Garand rifles with fixed bayonets silhouetted over a silver/gray Roman helmet adorned with a scarlet red horsehair festoon on a field of ultramarine blue with the attached organization motto. The Roman helmet is symbolic of the Praetorian Guard of the Roman Empire---the original Honor Guard of the Western World---whose duty it was to protect the reigning emperor. The red festoon denotes courage and valor. The silver/gray of the helmet proper represents the excellence expected of all USAF Honor Guard personnel. The crossed M1 rifles historically denote the unit's primary weapon (the M14 rifle became the unit's primary weapon in 2002; however the Honor Guard's Drill Team still continues to use the M1). The ultramarine blue background symbolizes the primary theater of Air Force operations - the sky and beyond. The attached motto, "To Honor With Dignity" best describes the unit's mission.

Some slight differences are apparent between the badges worn by members of the USAF HG, and those members of the BHGs. The USAF HG badge features the words "USAF HONOR GUARD" below and "TO HONOR WITH DIGNITY" above the main insignia and is polished silver. The BHG badge features the words "BASE HONOR GUARD" above and "TO HONOR WITH DIGNITY" below the main insignia and is multi-colored.

The badge is worn only while actively assigned to the USAF HG or BHG; upon completion of the member's tour of duty it must be removed. Prior to the full implementation of the Airman Battle Uniform (ABU) on 1 November 2011, a subdued patch version of the BHG badge was sewn onto the old battle dress uniform; but since unit and duty patches are not worn on the ABU, both the USAF HG unit patch and BHG patch have been relegated to history.

== See also ==
- Badges of the United States Air Force
- Obsolete badges of the United States military
- Uniforms of the United States Air Force
