= Navigator Badge =

US Air Force military qualification badge

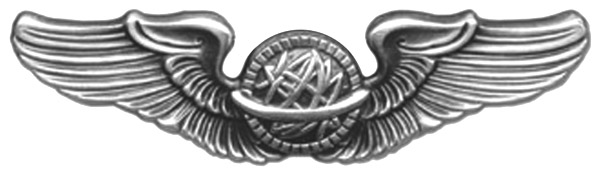
Original USAAF Navigator Badge

The Navigator Badge is a military qualification badge of the United States Air Force which was first created during the Second World War. The current USAF badge is designated by Air Force Instructions as the Navigator/Observer Badge and is issued to rated officers in both rating categories. In 2009, it was renamed as the Combat Systems Officer badge.

The badge recognizes the Aeronautical Rating of Navigator, now Combat Systems Officer. The original Navigator badge was a successor to the Observer Badge, which was issued to military aviation navigators in the 1920s and 1930s. With an increase in aircraft technology, however, the Navigator, Bombardier, Engineer, and Gunner badges were created to recognize the advanced training and qualifications required of various aircrew members.

The original Navigator badge was issued by the U.S. Army Air Forces and consisted of an armillary sphere centered between two wings. The badge was similar to the Aviator Badge and the Aircrew Badge. On July 26, 1947, the U.S. Air Force became a separate Branch of Service in the U.S. armed forces. and in late 1951 the Aircraft Observer, Navigator, and Bombardier badges were replaced with a single design, with the Air Force shield centered between two wings. At the same time, the aeronautical ratings of Navigator and Bombardier were merged into a single rating. The Aircraft Observer rating continued for Electronic Warfare Officers (EWOs), but eventually EWOs were awarded the Navigator-Bombardier aeronautical rating.

The current USAF Navigator/Combat Systems Officer/Observer Badge is issued in three degrees: Basic, Senior, and Master. The degree of the Navigator/Combat Systems Officer/Observer Badge is determined by years of flying service in the Air Force and by logged hours of flight time or flying duty assignment time. The degrees are annotated by a star alone (senior) and a star and wreath (master) centered above the badge.

There is also an astronaut version of the badge for those who have flown the NASA Space Shuttle and/or served on the International Space Station. Like its pilot astronaut counterpart, the Navigator/Observer Astronaut Badge is modified by the addition of the astronaut "shooting star" logo over the USAF shield on the wings. Navigator Astronauts or Combat Systems Officer Astronauts are those officers who have previously flown USAF aircraft as aeronautically rated Navigators / Combat Systems Officers and subsequently qualify as astronauts. A third variant of this same insignia is the Observer Astronaut. Today, the only personnel awarded the Observer rating are otherwise unrated U.S. Air Force officers who complete NASA Mission Specialist (astronaut) training and subsequently fly in space.

For Navy and Marine Corps officers, the equivalent of the Navigator Badge / Combat Systems Officer badge is known as the Naval Flight Officer insignia and is similar to the Naval Aviator insignia for pilots, being differentiated by two crossed fouled anchors behind the insignia's United States shield, versus the single upright fouled anchor of their USN, USMC and USCG pilot counterparts. The Coast Guard briefly had Naval Flight Officers when they operated E-2 Hawkeye aircraft bailed from the Navy. There is also an astronaut version of the badge for those who have flown the NASA Space Shuttle and/or served on the International Space Station. Like its Naval Aviator Astronaut counterpart, the Naval Flight Officer Astronaut Badge is modified by the addition of the astronaut "shooting star" logo over the US shield on the wings.

The Marine Corps also issues the Marine Aerial Navigator insignia to enlisted personnel trained as navigators for the KC-130. Unlike their USAF counterpart, the Navy, Marine Corps and Coast Guard aviation insignia have no basic, senior or master/command degrees. The Army has no equivalent to the Navigator Badge.

== Air Force Navigator Badge ==
=== Combat System Officer ratings ===
Combat System Officer badge

The Combat System Officer (CSO) awarded by the Commander or delegated wing commanders. Under a program that began in the fall of 2004 to replace the "Joint Specialized Undergraduate Navigator Training" course, portions of the previous navigator and electronic warfare officer training courses were combined into a curriculum with the objective of developing an aviator with cross-flow capability between the two positions on combat aircraft. The curriculum includes a wider range of topics, with an increased emphasis on warfighting, to develop leadership, decision-making and mission management skills. Navigators and CSOs wear identical badges. rating is awarded to individuals who entered the CSO Undergraduate Flying Training after 1 October 2004. The USAF awards combat system officer ratings at three levels: Combat System Officer, Senior Combat System Officer, and Master Combat System Officer, for active duty officers and officers considered rated assets in the Air Reserve Components. The insignia is identical to USAF Navigator, but rated navigators who are not CSO rated are not eligible for award of advanced CSO ratings. The following additional criteria are required for rating as a USAF Combat System Officer:

Rating	Basic requirement	Flight time	Alternative flight time
Master Combat System Officer	15 years as rated CSO, and; Permanent award of senior CSO rating, and	3000 total hours, or	2300 hours primary and instructor time, or; 144 months OFDA
Senior Combat System Officer	7 years as rated CSO, and; Permanent award of CSO rating, and	2000 total hours, or	1300 hours primary and instructor time, or; 72 months OFDA
Combat System Officer	Graduate of Combat System Officer Undergraduate Flying Training	No time required	

=== Navigator ratings ===
Navigator Badge

The USAF awards navigator ratings at three levels: Navigator, Senior Navigator, and Master Navigator, for active duty officers and officers considered "rated assets" in the Air Reserve Components. After 2009 only Combat System Operators receive ratings formerly awarded to navigators, as the occupational field is being phased out. The following additional criteria are required for rating as a USAF Navigator:

Rating	Basic requirement	Flight time	Alternative flight time
Master Navigator	15 years as rated navigator, and; Permanent award of senior navigator rating, and	3000 total hours, or	2300 hours primary and instructor time, or; 144 months OFDA
Senior Navigator	7 years as rated navigator; Permanent award of navigator rating, or; Interservice transfer to USAF (including Air Reserve Component) of any former USN or USMC Naval Flight Officer with 7 years and similar flight time totals as a designated NFO	2000 total hours	1300 hours primary and instructor time, or; 72 months OFDA
Navigator	Graduate of USAF Undergraduate Navigator Training (UNT) / USAF-USN Interservice Undergraduate Navigator Training (IUNT) / USAF-USN Specialized Undergraduate Navigator Training (SUNT), or; Graduate of USN/USMC Naval Flight Officer course, VT-86 (RIO, TN or OJN training pipelines); Graduate of USN Naval Flight Officer (NAV training pipeline) course at either: VT-29 (Advanced Navigation Training Course at NAS Corpus Christi); 323 FTW (Interservice Undergraduate Navigator Training (IUNT) at Mather AFB); or 12 FTW (Specialized Undergraduate Navigator Training (SUNT) at Randolph AFB)	400 hours primary navigator time	None Reviewed by Aeronautical Rating Board and approved by Major Command

=== Observer ratings ===
Observer Badge

The USAF awards observer ratings at three levels: Observer, Senior Observer, and Master Observer, for active duty officers and officers considered "rated assets" in the Air Reserve Components. The insignia is identical to USAF Navigator/CSO and is typically only awarded as an "observer" insignia with the Astronaut emblem to USAF officers who have completed training as NASA Mission Specialist Astronauts, have flown at least once in space in the Space Shuttle and/or served at the International Space Station, and are not otherwise rated as USAF Pilots or USAF Navigators/CSOs. The following additional criteria are required to be rated as a USAF Observer:

Rating	Basic requirement	Flight time	Alternative flight time
Master Observer	15 years as rated observer, and; Permanent award of senior observer rating, and	3000 total hours, or	2300 hours primary and instructor time, or; 144 months OFDA
Senior Observer	7 years as rated observer, and; Permanent award of observer rating. and	2000 total hours, or	1300 hours primary and instructor time, or; 72 months OFDA
Observer	Graduate of NASA Mission Specialist training	No time required	

== See also ==
- Badges of the United States Air Force
- Obsolete badges of the United States military
