= Cyber Defense Operations Badge =

The Cyber Defense Operations Badge, previously the Cyberspace Support Badge is a qualification award of the US Air Force for its Warfighter Communications career field and the US Space Force that has been awarded since November of 2009. The Cyberspace support mission is to prevent outside forces from using international networks to attack the United States in operations and support roles. The badge is issued in Basic, Senior and Master under Air Force Instruction CFETP 1D7XX/X Parts I and II. It is issued to only enlisted personnel in the 1D7X career fields: Enterprise Operations (1D7X1Q), Mission Defense Activities (1D7X1M), Data Operations (1D7X1P) and XCOMM or Expeditionary Communications (1D7X1W). From 2009 to 2023, this badge was called the Cyberspace Support Badge and the US Space Force seems to continue to call it by that name.

On 1 November 2021, all cyber enlisted Airmen transitioned from the 3DXXX Cyberspace Support Air Force Specialty Code (AFSC) to the 1D7XX Cyber Defense Operations AFSC.

In 2025, the Air Force renamed the 1D7XX career field from Cyber Defense Operations to Warfighter Communications, but the badge has not been renamed.

General officers wear the basic badge when they are in a headquarters staff or command position, unless they qualify for a higher-level badge. They can upgrade to the next level every 12 months. Officers (O-1 to O-6) wear the basic badge after graduating technical school or gaining a qualified AFSC. They can upgrade to senior after 7 years in the specialty and the master badge after 15 years.. Enlisted airmen wear the basic badge after completing technical school. They can upgrade to the senior badge after award of the 7-skill level, and the master badge as an E-7 (master sergeant) or above with 5 years in the specialty.

== Design ==
The badge is a wreathed badge with a globe in the center signifying projection of cyberspace power, with a mailed fist (gauntlet) representing the cyberspace commanders griping lightning bolts representing the forms of communication.

Cyber Defense Operations Badge
Basic	Senior	Master

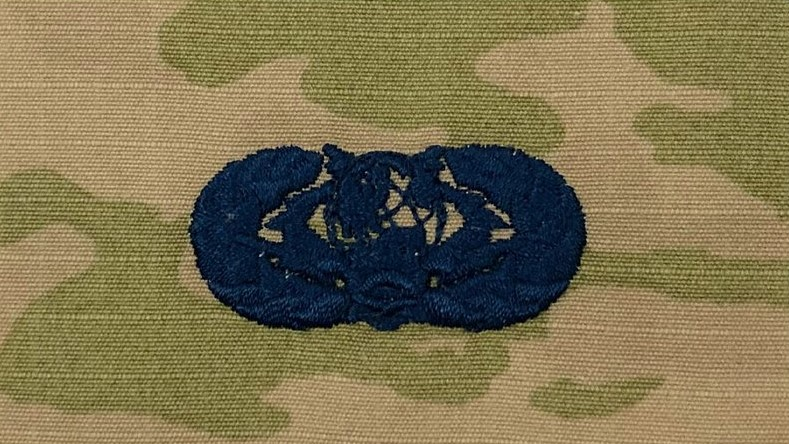
Basic Cyberspace Support Badge

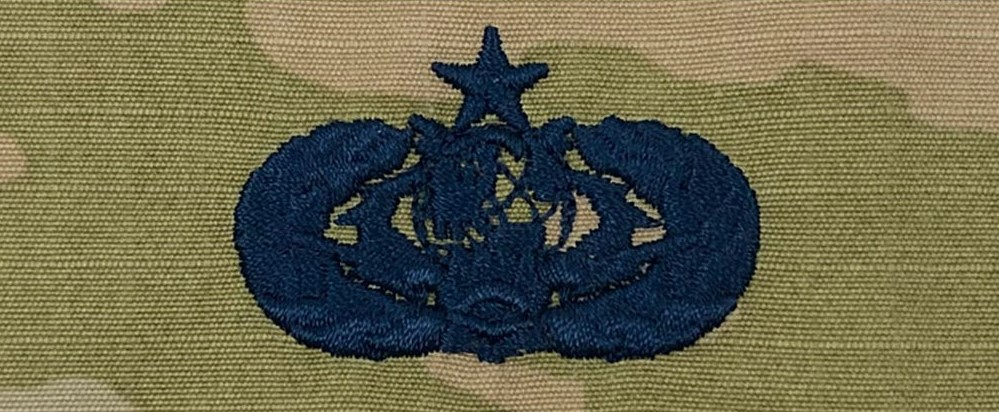
Senior Cyberspace Support Badge

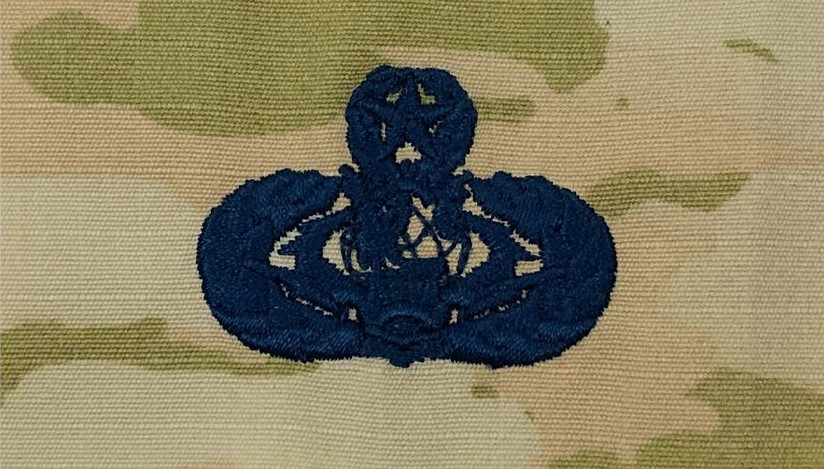
Master Cyberspace Support Badge
