= Air Force Commander's Insignia =

Insignia of the United States Air Force,

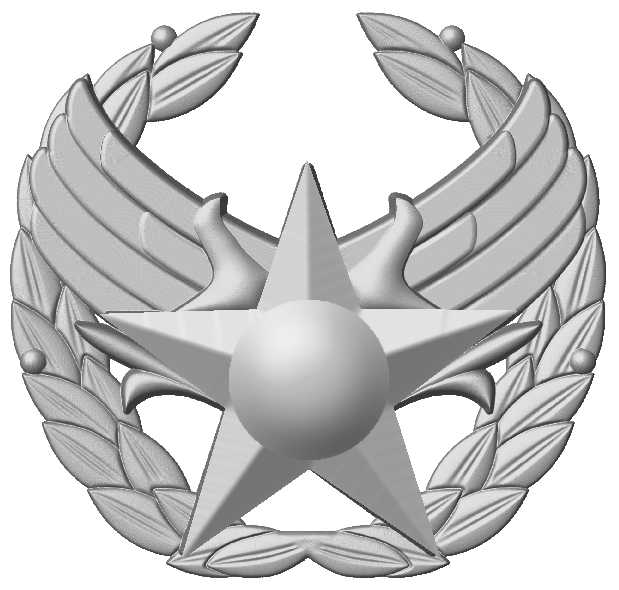
Air Force Commander's Insignia

The Air Force Commander's Insignia is an insignia of the United States Air Force and United States Space Force, that has been in existence since 2002. Also known as the USAF Commander's Badge, the Air Force Commander's Insignia is awarded to any Air Force officer who holds an established command billet within the United States Air Force.

To be eligible for the Air Force Commander's Insignia, an Air Force officer must hold a permanent assignment in a command billet, normally in the rank of Major or above. Examples of such billets would include any unit with a C-prefixed Commander including: Detachment, Squadron, Group, and Wing commanders, as well as the commanding officers of major Air Force installations such as Air Force bases. Commanders of Air Force Reserve Officer Training Corps (ROTC) Detachments are also authorized to wear the Air Force Commander's Badge. Commanders of a Numbered Air Force (NAF) or a Major Command (MAJCOM) do not wear the Command Insignia as it is only authorized for Colonels and below, and these commanders are typically General officers.

== Guidelines for wear ==
Below are some general guidelines for award of the Air Force Commander's Insignia:

On the Service Dress and Service Uniform, Current Commanders must wear the insignia above the name tag. The insignia may be worn below the name tag upon completion of such a command assignment.

On the OCP and Two Piece Flight Duty Uniform (2PFDU), current commanders must wear the commander’s insignia, embroidered in spice brown on OCP fabric, above their name tape on their right chest. Graduated commanders may wear the patch on the left shoulder panel above their MAJCOM patch.

On the Flight Duty Uniform (FDU or Flight Suit), current commanders are required to have the insignia embroidered on the wearers right side of the name tag. Graduated commanders do not wear the insignia on the FDU.

== Equivalents ==
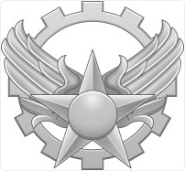

- The Air Force Materiel Leader's Insignia is equivalent to the Air Force Commander's Insignia. On 6 June 2025, AF/A1 signed an exception to policy (ETP) to authorize Materiel Leaders and Senior Materiel Leaders to wear the ML Insignia on Air Force uniforms. That ETP specified the ML "insignia will be worn in the same manner or area that current Command insignia pins are worn on Air Force uniforms. This exception to policy will remain in effect until the guidance is published in DAFI 36-2903, Dress and Personal Appearance of Department of the Air Force Personnel."
- As of June 2025, United States Space Force Commanders wear the Air Force Commander's Insignia. Space Force Materiel Leaders and Senior Materiel Leaders do not wear the Air Force Commander's Insignia. The Space Force has no equivalent for Materiel Leaders and Senior Materiel Leaders.
- The United States Navy and United States Coast Guard equivalents of the Air Force Commander's Insignia are the Command at Sea insignia and the Command Ashore insignia.
- The United States Marine Corps has no equivalent.
- The United States Army equivalent was the Leader's Identification Insignia, a green cloth loop worn by command leaders, commissioned and enlisted, on the shoulder loops of the obsoleted Army green service and BDU cold-weather field jackets.

== See also ==
- Military badges of the United States
