= Cyberspace Operator Badge =

Award of the US Air and Space Forces

The Cyberspace Operator Badge is a qualification award of the US Air Force and US Space Force it was first announced by USAF Chief of Staff Gen. Norton A. Schwartz in 2010 for cyberspace operators. The badge is issued in Basic, Senior and Master under Air Force Instruction 36–2903. It is issued to both enlisted and officers. Officers converting from career field 33S (communications-computer) to 17D (cyberspace warfare operator) were immediately eligible for the badge which will replace the Air Force Communications and Information Badge in those career fields. Additionally it was announced that the 12W (electronic warfare officer) would also be eligible. Enlisted operators with the 1B4X1 or 1B000 AFSC are also awarded the badge.

The badge was first proposed in 2008 when AFCYBER was first being created.

== Design ==
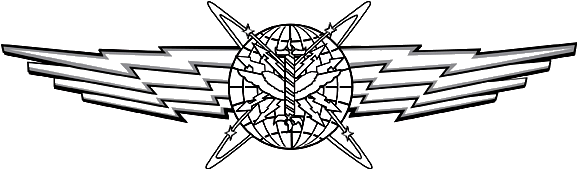
Cyberspace Operator Basic

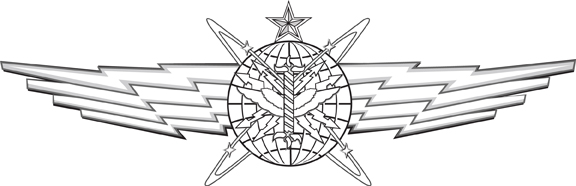
Cyberspace Operator Senior

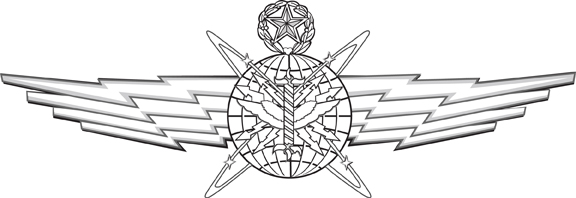
Cyberspace Operator Master

The lightning bolt wings signify the cyberspace domain and the globe signifies the projection of cyber power world-wide and the communications heritage. The bolted wings, centered on the globe, are a design element from the Air Force seal. The orbits signify the space dimension of the domain.
