= CATM =

CATM may refer to:

- Canadian Army Training Memorandum, a military bulletin
- Captive Air Training Missile, an inert air-to-air/ground dummy missile
- Center for Air Toxic Metals, a Center of Excellence of the Energy and Environmental Research Center
- Combat Arms Training and Maintenance, a United States Air Force military training organization
