= United States Air Force Honor Guard =

Official ceremonial unit of the United States Air Force

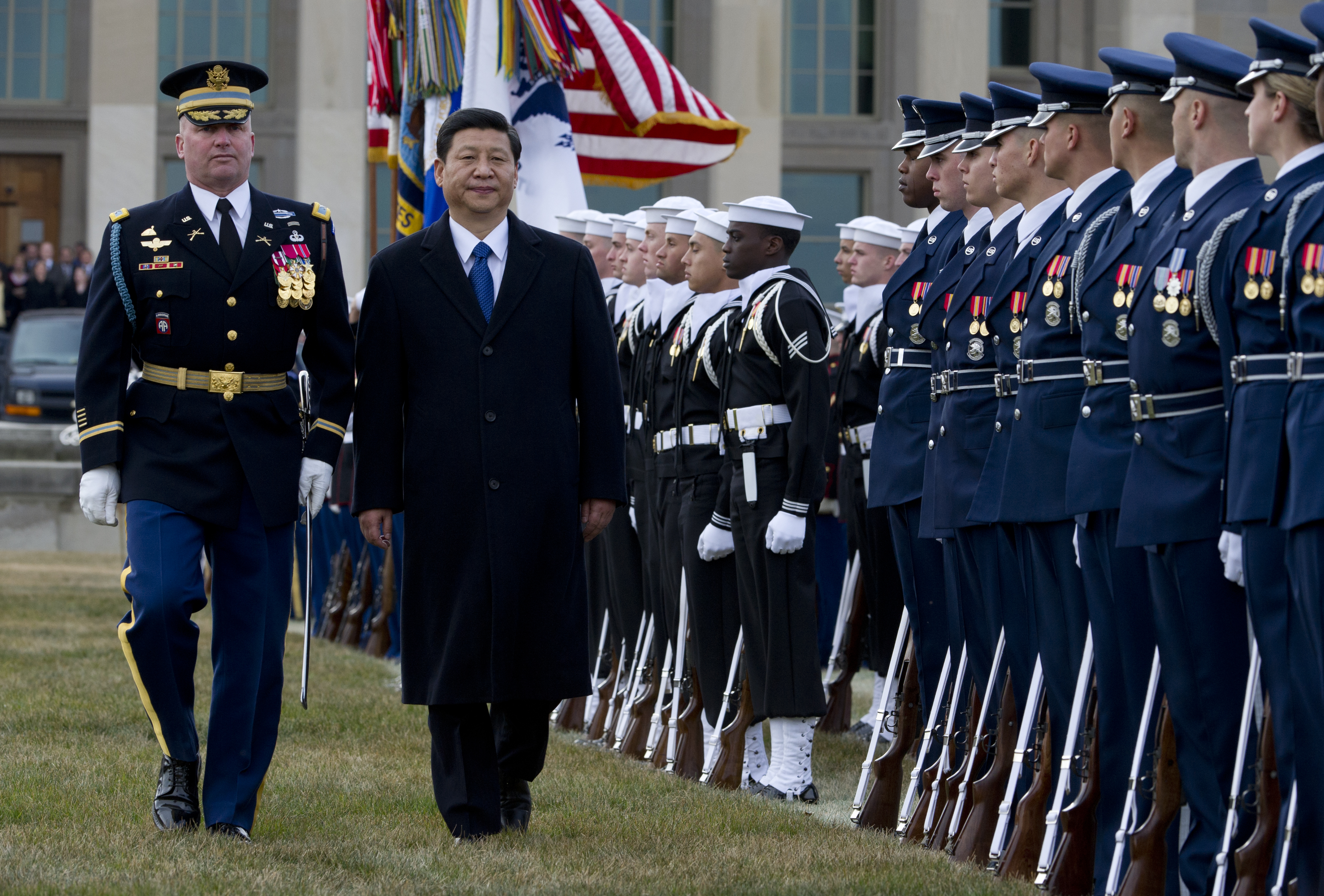
The United States Air Force Honor Guard is reviewed by then-Chinese Vice President Xi Jinping, during a Joint Services arrival ceremony at the Pentagon, 14 Feb. 2012.

The United States Air Force Honor Guard is the official ceremonial unit of the United States Air Force and is assigned to Joint Base Anacostia-Bolling, Washington D.C.

== Overview ==
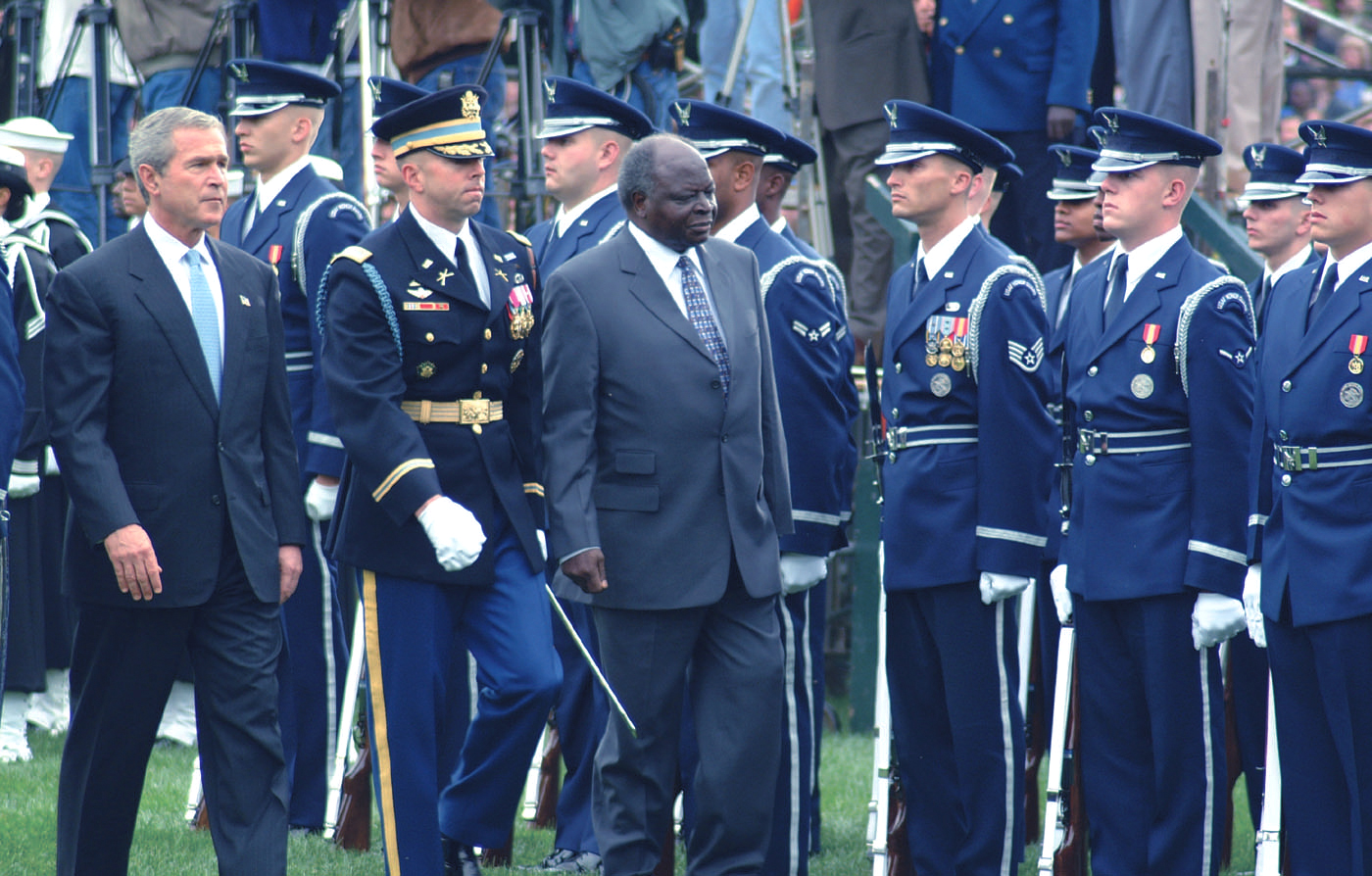
President George W. Bush and Mwai Kibaki, Kenya's head of state, pass in front of the USAF HG during an arrival ceremony on the south lawn of the White House.

The Honor Guard's primary mission is to represent the U.S. Air Force at all public and official ceremonies within the National Capital Region and abroad when directed by the Military District of Washington, Headquarters U.S. Air Force or subordinate commands. Ceremonies include those for visiting dignitaries and military officials, funerals for deceased Air Force personnel and their dependents, wreath-laying ceremonies at the Tomb of the Unknowns at Arlington National Cemetery, White House arrival ceremonies, receptions, and other state and military occasions which comprise the Honor Guards of all six armed services (U.S. Army, U.S. Navy, U.S. Marine Corps, U.S. Air Force, U.S. Space Force and U.S. Coast Guard). A posting to this unit is considered a special duty assignment, meaning that Air Force members worldwide from all career fields can apply. If selected, they are withdrawn from their career fields and reassigned to Bolling AFB for a standard tour of duty (normally 3 years; basic trainees are assigned for 2). An Honor Guard member is traditionally referred to as a Ceremonial Guardsman.

== Origins ==
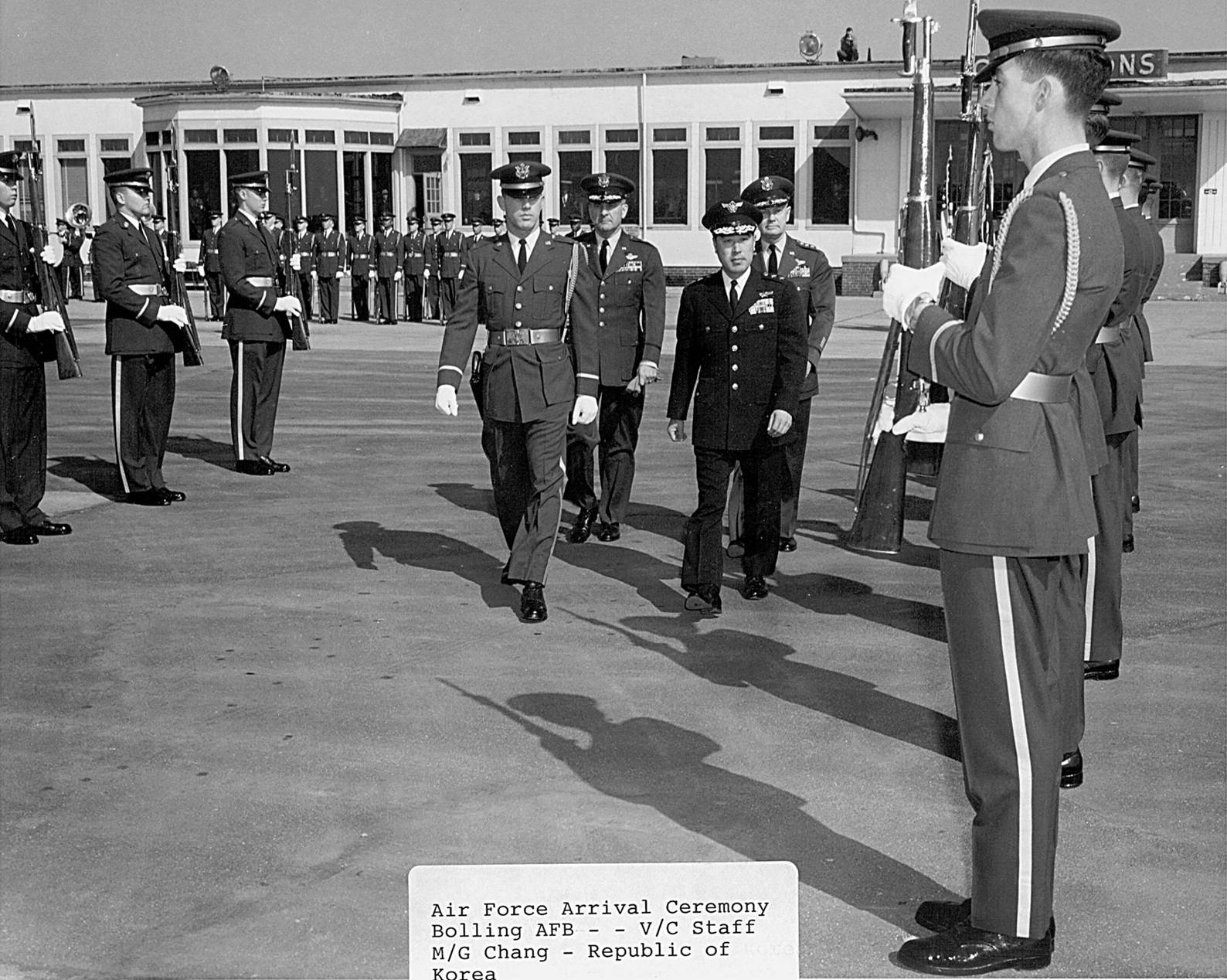
The 1100th Air Police Squadron Ceremonial Unit welcomes General Jang Do-young to Bolling AFB, Washington D.C. (circa 1960s).

The origins of the USAF Honor Guard can be traced to May 1948 when Headquarters Command, United States Air Force, directed the creation of an elite ceremonial unit comparable to that of the other services. A ceremonial unit was activated within the 1100th Air Police Squadron, USAF Air Police, at Bolling AFB with the responsibility of maintaining an Air Force ceremonial capability in the National Capital Region. The USAF HG officially became an Air Force squadron in 1972.

== Colors ==
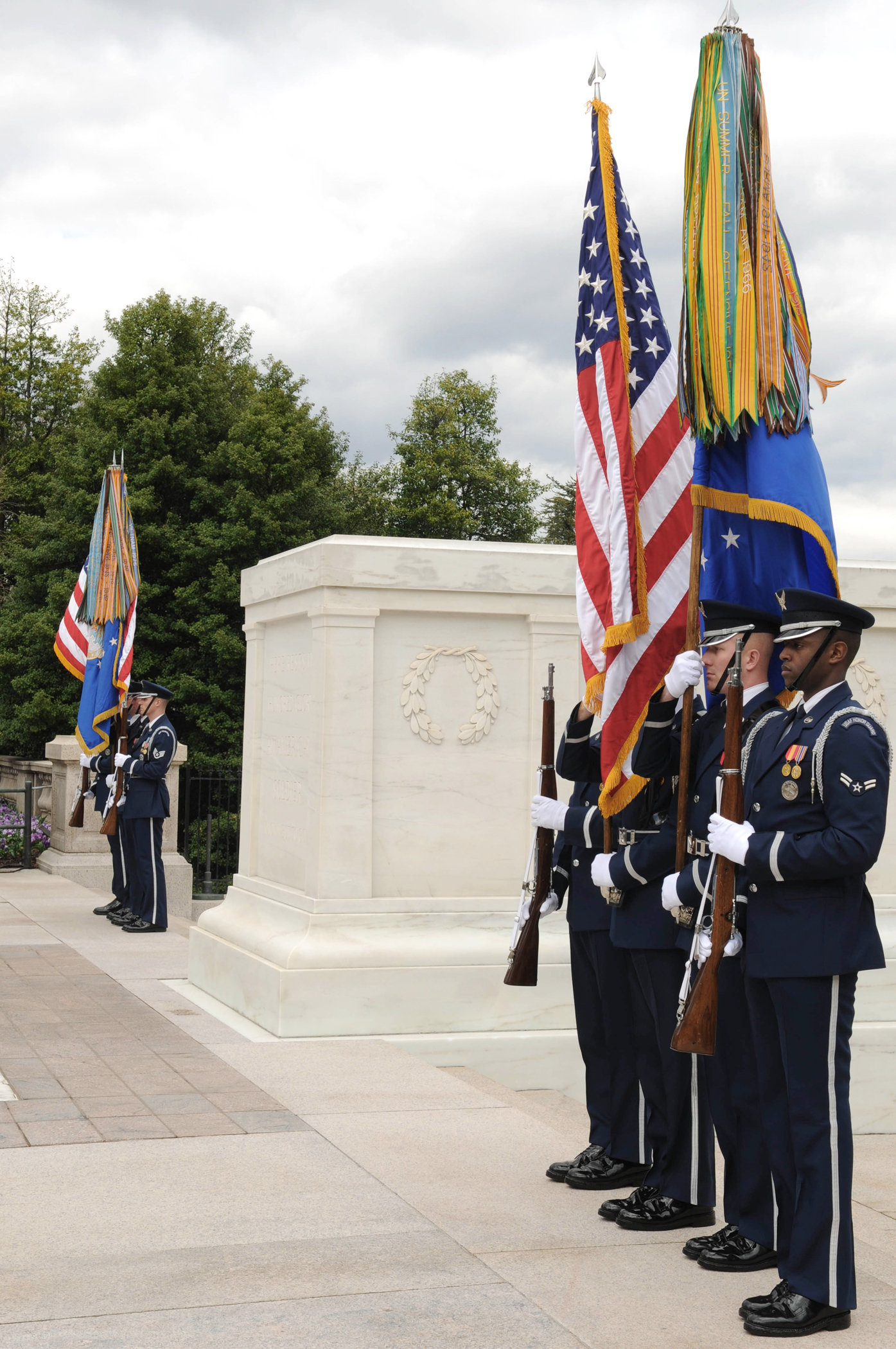
Two USAF HG color teams take part in an Air Force Wreath-Laying ceremony at the Tomb of the Unknowns at Arlington National Cemetery.

Colors' mission is to display and bear the Flag of the United States, the United States Air Force, Space Force, and the flags of other States, and organizations, as required. Members are also responsible for carrying the USAF Honor Guard guidon. A color team usually comprises four individuals: the Non-Commissioned Officer-in-charge (NCOIC) of the team (known as the NCT) who carries the National and commands the team, the Air Force flag bearer, and two rifle guards whose responsibility is to guard the flags. Color teams evolved from the custom of carrying the colors onto the battlefield during the 18th and 19th centuries to identify the location of the combatants and to inspire pride and confidence in them. The battle streamers that hang from the top of the Air Force flagstaff symbolically represent every conflict and campaign that the Air Force has participated in since its inception in 1907 as the U.S. Army Aeronautical Division. The streamers weigh in at nearly 40 pounds in addition to the weight of the flag and the staff. There are ceremonies in which additional flags are carried as well which can increase the size of a color team to as many as eight members or more.

== Pallbearers ==
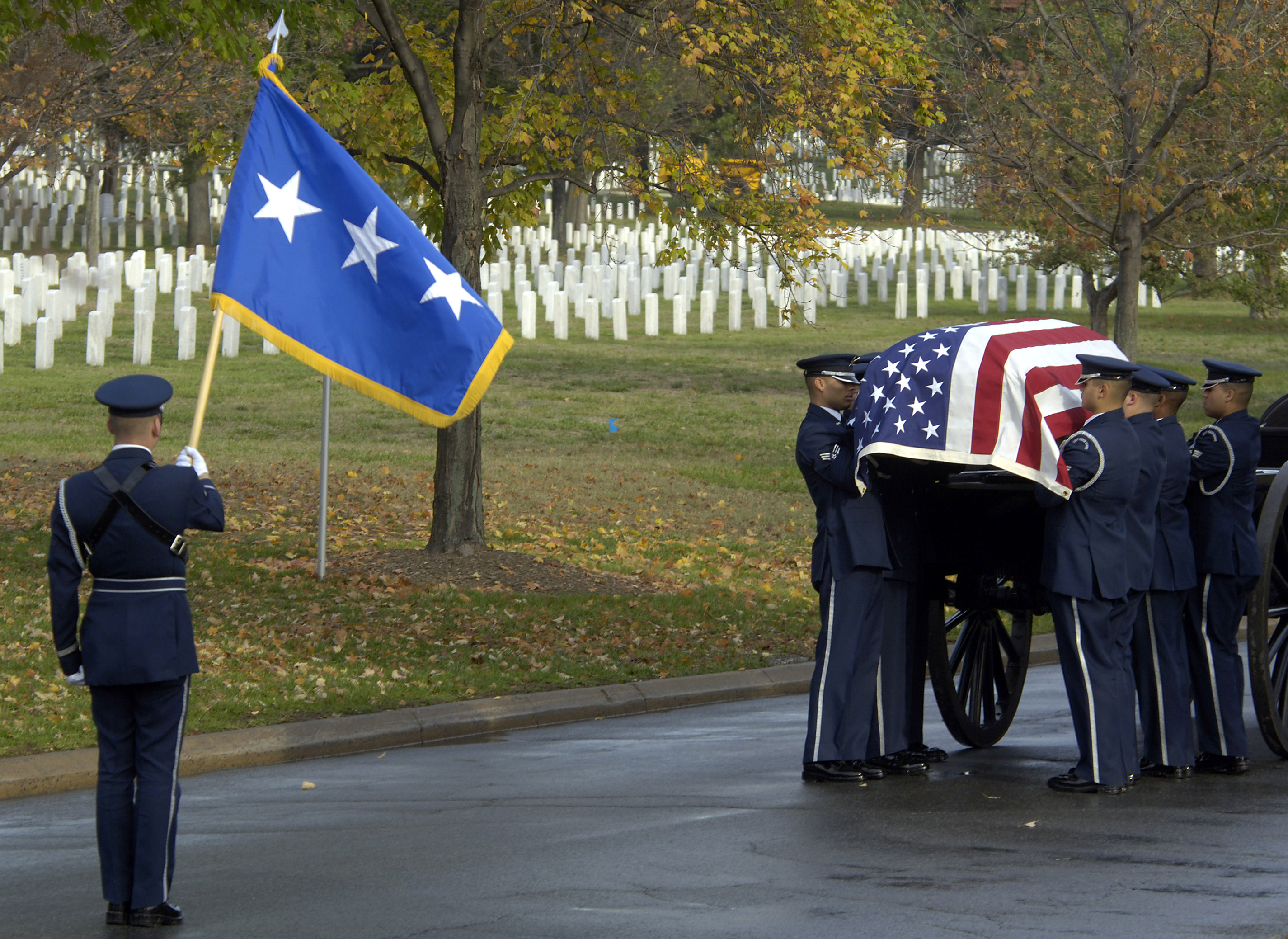
Pallbearers transfer the remains of a lieutenant general from the horse-drawn caisson to the gravesite during a funeral at Arlington National Cemetery.

Pallbearers participate in Air Force, Joint Service, and state funerals by bearing the remains of deceased service members, dependents, and senior and/or national leaders to their gravesites. During the US Civil War, the only wheeled vehicles available on the battlefield were usually artillery caissons, they were used transport the deceased to the grave, a custom which is practiced today in Arlington National Cemetery. As there were usually a lack of stretchers to carry the dead off the field, the practice of using flags to carry remains originated during the Napoleonic Wars and is represented today when a casket is draped with the American flag. The caskets generally weigh from 450 to 600 pounds, but there are exceptions, when some caskets have been known to exceed 900 pounds. The distance from caisson to grave usually comprises at least 60 yards. Once the gravesite is reached, the bearers' duties continue by holding the flag taut and level over the casket until the service is complete. The flag is then folded by the bearers and presented to the next-of-kin of the deceased.

== Firing Party ==
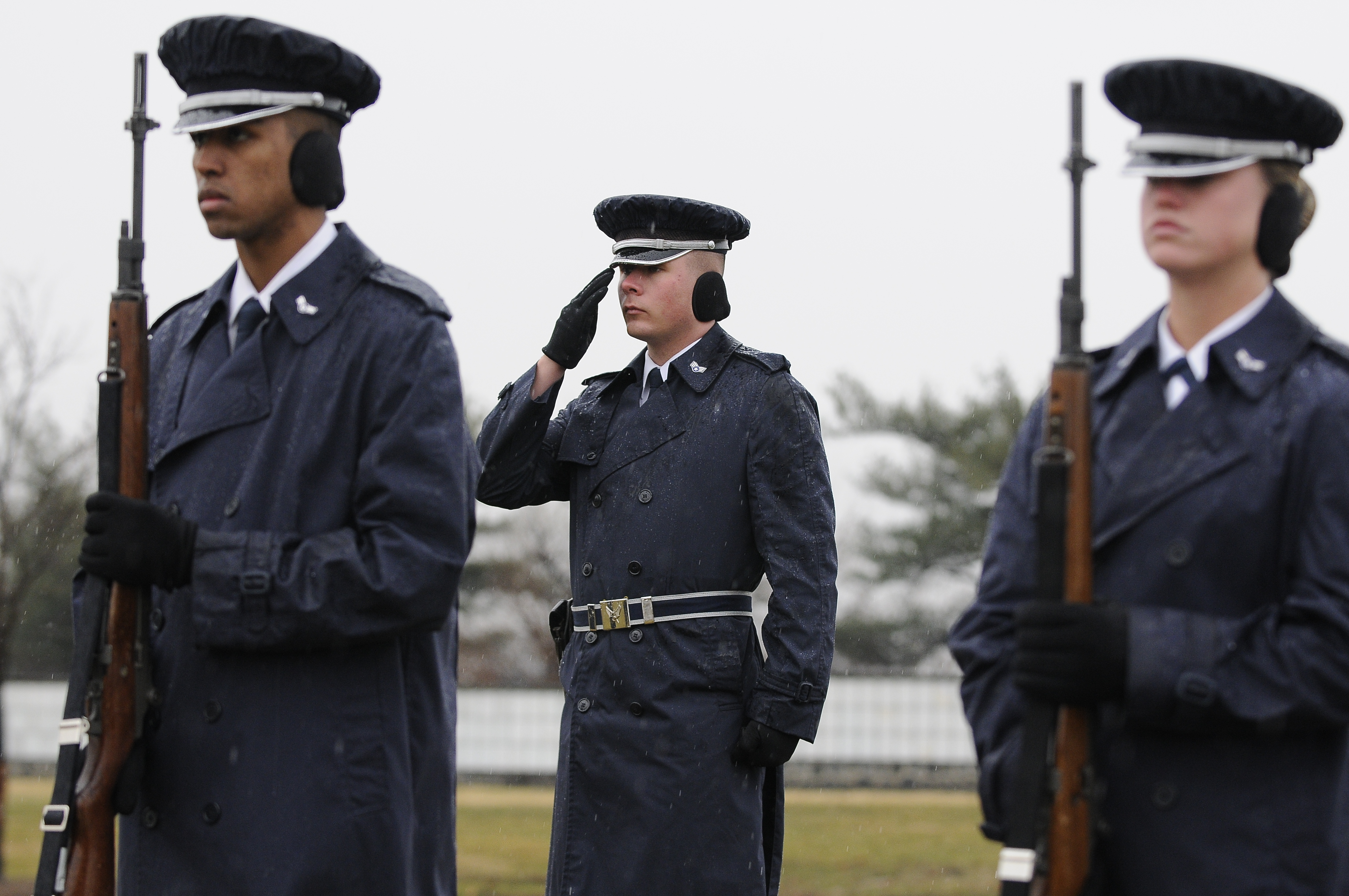
A USAF HG firing party renders honors during a funeral at Arlington National Cemetery.

The Firing Party fires three volleys of rifle fire at the gravesite to honor the deceased during funeral services. It is commonly thought that as there are seven members on the party (the NCOIC of the firing party is the eighth member and is known as the "NFP") with each firing three rounds. This is referred to as the "three-volley salute" which can be traced to the European Dynastic Wars. It is not to be confused with the "21-gun salute" which is reserved for heads of state and comes from Naval origin.

== Combat Guard ==
The Combat Guard undergoing training at Fort Dix, New Jersey in March 2001---six months before 9-11.

In early 2001, General John W. Handy, then-Air Force Vice Chief-of-Staff, directed that the unit be assigned a wartime contingency mission. Shortly thereafter, under the guidance of the squadron commander Lieutenant Colonel (now Brigadier General) Bradley Spacy, thirteen Ceremonial Guardsmen (four NCOs and nine Airmen) were selected to stand-up a squad consisting of three four-man fire teams and a squad leader. Its mission was to augment the 11th Security Forces Squadron (11th SFS) at Bolling AFB in case extra manpower was needed to secure and/or defend the base. In March of that same year, the squad traveled to Fort Dix, New Jersey to attend the Air Base Ground Defense Squad Operations Course where they received two weeks of mission-specific infantry training. At their graduation ceremony, General Handy personally presented certificates to each squad member. Handy's foresight proved to be well-founded; six months later the squad was activated when the Pentagon was attacked by terrorists on September 11, 2001. For approximately forty-five days, the squad was attached to the 11SFS and augmented their forces, helping secure and defend the base against possible follow-on attacks. The squad is no longer active.

== Unit Emblems, Guidon, and Symbology ==
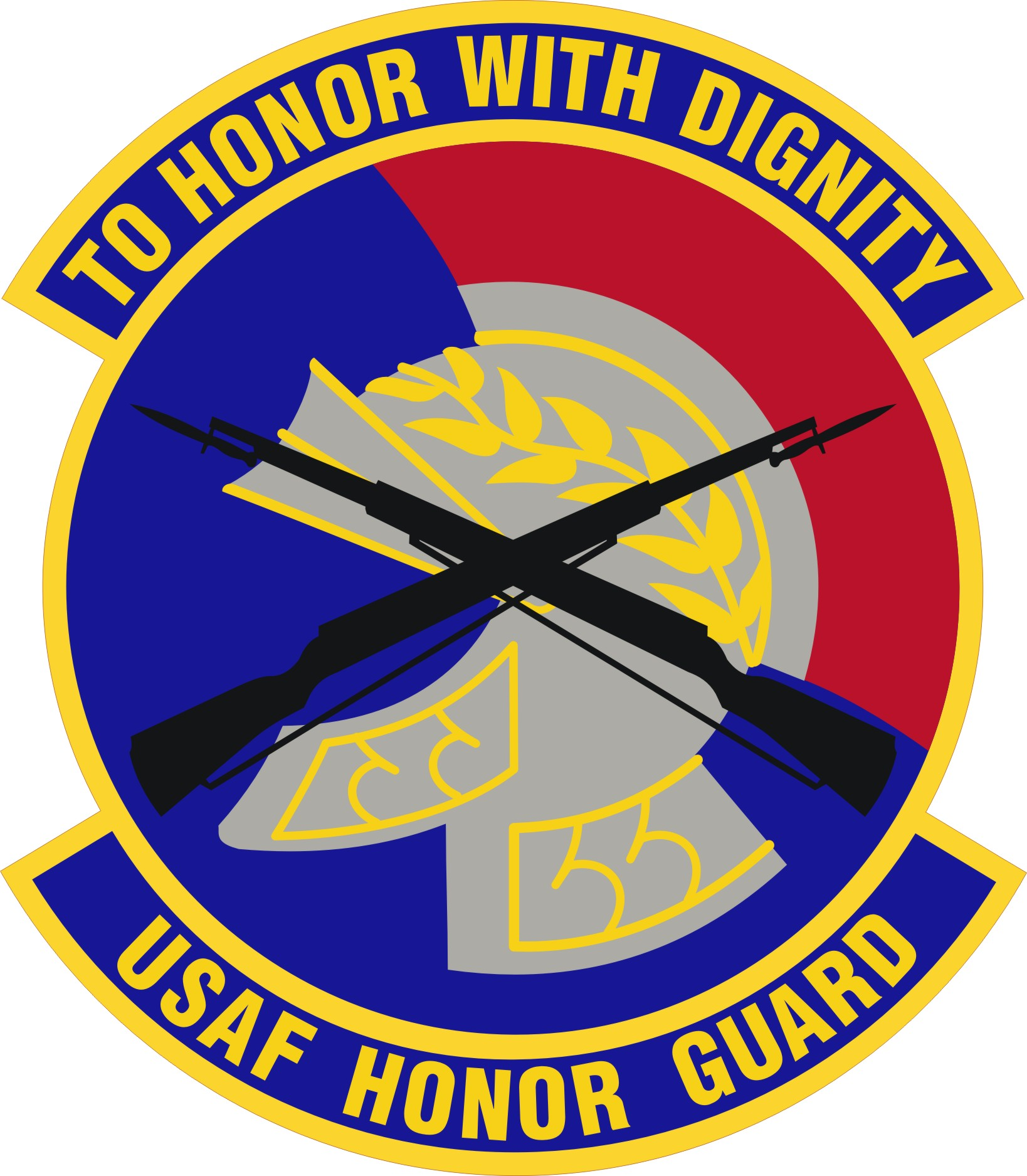
The emblem of the USAF HG, approved on 4 October 1976 and revised on 23 February 2011.

The unit emblem was designed by former superintendent Malcolm Haines prior to 1973. It is composed of crossed rifles with fixed bayonets silhouetted over a silver/gray Roman helmet adorned with a scarlet red horsehair festoon on a field of ultramarine blue with the attached organization motto. The Roman helmet is symbolic of the Praetorian Guard of the Roman Empire---the original Honor Guard of the Western World---whose duty it was to protect the reigning emperor. The red festoon denotes courage and valor. The silver/gray of the helmet proper represents the excellence expected of all USAF HG personnel. The crossed rifles historically denote the unit's primary weapon. The ultramarine blue background symbolizes the primary theater of Air Force operations—the sky and beyond. The attached motto, "To Honor With Dignity" best describes the unit's mission. The emblem is the centerpiece of the Air Force Honor Guard Badge, duty badges, that are worn by USAF HG personnel as well as Base Honor Guard members with slight differences between the two.

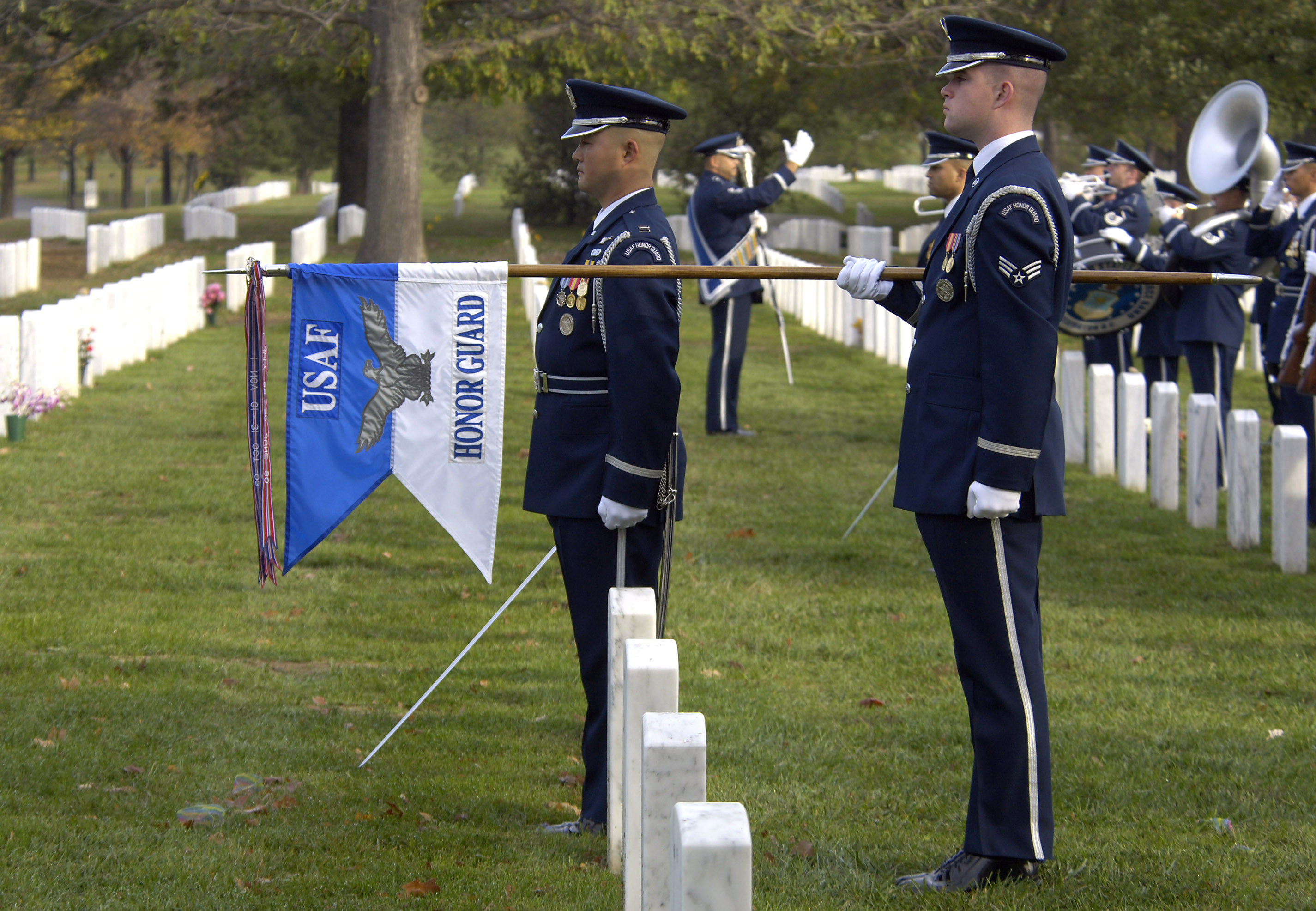
The USAF HG guidon, shown here during a funeral in Arlington National Cemetery, was created in 2000.

Historically, the purpose of a guidon was to mark the position of a particular unit on the battlefield. Today, its function is to represent a particular unit during ceremonies. The United States Air Force Honor Guard guidon is unique in comparison to other Air Force squadron guidons in that it is two-toned rather than one solid color. In 2000, Technical Sergeant Timothy Carney was tasked by Captain Leo Lawson, then-officer-in-charge of Ceremonial Flight, to develop a design for a guidon that would distinctly represent the USAF HG during ceremonies. The design is derived from the U.S. Army cavalry guidon of the 19th century. The blue and silver-white of the guidon represent the Air Force's colors---blue for the sky and silver-white for clouds and striking power in the medium of the air. The eagle represents the American eagle while the words "USAF Honor Guard" are self-explanatory.

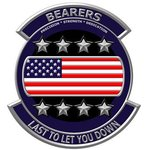
The Bearers logo created in 2000.

The Bearers' logo was created by an unidentified Bearer in 2000. Symbolically, it represents a casket draped with an American flag, flanked on both sides by eight stars which represent the number of body bearers required for a funeral with full military honors and the use of a caisson. The motto "Last To Let You Down" represents the loyalty and honor that the Bearers accords to a fallen service member as well as literally letting (setting) the casket of the deceased down at the gravesite.

The Firing Party logo, created in 2000.

The Firing Party logo was created in 2000 by Technical Sergeant Timothy Carney, then-NCOIC of the Firing Party. Symbolically, the colors of yellow, black and gray represent the components of gunpowder: yellow for sulfur, black for charcoal and gray for potassium nitrate. The crossed rifles represent the primary weapon of the Firing Party and the three seven-pointed star-bursts represent three volleys of seven fired in unison. The twenty-one stars that encircle the emblem represent twenty-one rounds fired in honor of a fallen service-member. The motto, "Excolo Per Ignis" is Latin for "to honor by fire" which is best represents the Firing Party mission.

== Base Honor Guard ==
Until 1995, the U.S. Air Force used the base detail method to provide military funeral honors for those who died in the geographic area that a particular Air Force base was responsible for. The Mortuary Affairs office would routinely task either the base's security police squadron or fledgling Honor Guard detachment with the burial detail. However, these detail members usually had little to no experience with burials, thus the quality of the ceremony suffered. To correct this, the USAF Honor Guard established the Protocol, Honors and Ceremonies course and instituted the Base Honor Guard (BHG) program in 1995. This provided BHG programs with written guidance and standardization on funeral procedures (as well as other military ceremonies) and standardized the wear of the ceremonial uniform at all Air Force bases worldwide. BHG members are Airmen, non-commissioned officers (sergeants) and officers assigned to the same base, but in different career fields. Although BHG members are not members of the Air Force Honor Guard, a majority of them apply and are frequently selected for duty due to their acquired experience and exceptional military bearing. The uniform worn by BHG and Air Force Honor Guard members is the same with the following exceptions: Air Force Honor Guard members wear a white shirt, full-size anodized medals, a chrome functional badge and a shoulder arc worded "USAF HONOR GUARD". BHG members wear standard Air Force blue shirts, service ribbons, a colorized enamel functional badge and a shoulder arc worded "BASE HONOR GUARD". Depending on the circumstances, a contingent of Airmen from an Air Force base may travel to Washington, D.C. for formal training conducted by United States Air Force Honor Guard's training flight or vice versa.

== The Charge ==
Before it was revised in 1999, the original United States Air Force Honor Guard "Creed," written by Staff Sergeant Al Turner in the 1980s, epitomized the pride, mindset and professionalism of every Ceremonial Guardsman; in order to preserve the history and tradition of the unit, it is important that it be presented here in its entirety:

I am a proud member of the United States Air Force Honor Guard. My standards of conduct and high level of professionalism place me above all others in my service. I have earned the right to wear the ceremonial uniform, one which is honored in a rich tradition and history. I am superbly conditioned to perfect all movements throughout every drill and ceremony. The level in which I perform will never be dictated by the type of ceremony, the severity of the temperature, nor the size of the crowd. I am constantly driven to excel by a strong sense of dedication that runs deeper than patriotism. While on ceremonies, I stand sharp and crisp, motionless by choice, for I have voluntarily chosen to represent every member past and present of the United States Air Force. I am a Ceremonial Guardsman.

Revised version is as follows.

"Handpicked to serve as a member of the United States Air Force Honor Guard, my standards of conduct and level of professionalism must be above reproach, for I represent all others in my service.

Others earned the right for me to wear the ceremonial uniform, one that is honored in a rich tradition and history. I will honor their memory by wearing it properly and proudly.

Never will I allow my performance to be dictated by the type of ceremony, severity of the temperature, or size of the crowd. I will remain superbly conditioned to perfect all movements throughout every drill and ceremony.

Obligated by my oath, I am constantly driven to excel by a deep devotion to duty and a strong sense of dedication.

Representing every member, past and present, of the United States Air Force, I vow to stand SHARP, CRISP and MOTIONLESS, for I am a ceremonial guardsman!"

== See also ==
- King's Colour Squadron

== Sources ==
- This text was taken from AFPAM 36-2241V1, pp. 120–121.1
