= Air Force Specialty Code =

Alphanumeric code used by the US Air Force to identify a specific job

The Air Force Specialty Code (AFSC) is an alphanumeric code used by the United States Air Force to identify a specific job. Officer AFSCs consist of four characters and enlisted AFSCs consist of five characters. A letter prefix or suffix may be used with an AFSC when more specific identification of position requirements and individual qualifications is necessary. The AFSC is similar to the military occupational specialty codes (MOS Codes) used by the United States Army and the United States Marine Corps or enlisted ratings and USN officer designators and Naval officer billet classifications (NOBCs) used by the United States Navy and enlisted ratings and USCG officer specialties used by the United States Coast Guard. The United States Space Force equivalent is known as the Space Force Specialty Code (SFSC).

== History ==
After the Air Force separated from the Army in 1947, it retained the Army's system of MOS occupation codes, modifying them in 1950. These were 5-digit codes; for example a maintenance data systems specialist was 39150 and a weather technician was 25170. In October 1993, the Air Force implemented a new system of AFSCs, aligning occupations with the force wide restructuring that was implemented under Merrill McPeak. These reduced officer AFSCs from 216 to 123 and enlisted AFSCs from 203 to 176.

== Enlisted AFSCs ==
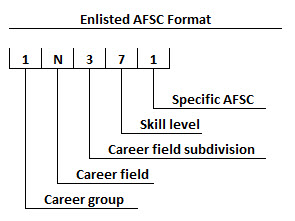

The enlisted AFSC consists of five alphanumeric characters:

- Career group (numerical)
  1. Operations
  2. Logistics & maintenance
  3. Support
  4. Medical
  5. Professional
  6. Acquisition
  7. Special investigations
  8. Special duty identifiers, typically used for Airmen chosen for specialized jobs
  9. Reporting identifiers, typically used for Airmen in transitive status: trainees, awaiting retraining, prisoner, etc. And occasionally for Airmen chosen for specialized jobs.
- Career field (alpha, different for each)
- Career field subdivision (numerical, different for each)
- Skill level

1 – Helper (recruits or trainees in technical school)
3 – Apprentice (technical school graduates applying and expanding their job skills)
5 – Journeyman (experienced airmen functioning as front-line technicians and initial trainers)
7 – Craftsman (airmen with many years of experience in the specialty, responsible for supervision and training)
9 – Superintendent (airmen in the grade of Senior Master Sergeant and above, with at least 14 years of experience, responsible for broad supervision)
0 – Chief enlisted manager (CEM) (airmen in the grade of Chief Master Sergeant responsible for policy and direction on a broad scale, from the individual squadron to HQ USAF levels)

- Specific AFSC (numeric, specialty within career field subdivision)

For example, in the AFSC 1N371:

- The career group is 1 (operations)
- The career field is 1N (intelligence)
- The career field subdivision is 1N3 (cryptologic linguist)
- The skill level is 7 (craftsman)
- The specific AFSC is 1N371 (crypto-linguist)

For some specialties, an alpha prefix is used to denote a special ability, skill, qualification or system designator not restricted to a single AFSC (such as "X" for an aircrew position). Additionally, an alpha suffix (a "shredout") denotes positions associated with particular equipment or functions within a single specialty (an Afrikaans specialist in the Germanic linguist field would have an "E" shredout). Using the above example, the AFSC X1N371E would refer to a Germanic cryptologic linguist who is aircrew qualified and specializes in Afrikaans.

Here is an extended listing of AFSC groups. Most categories have numerous actual AFSCs in them.

=== Operations ===
- 1A – Aircrew operations
  - 1A1X2 – Mobility force aviator
    - 1A1X2A – C-5 flight engineer
    - 1A1X2B – C-5 loadmaster
    - 1A1X2C – C-17 loadmaster
    - 1A1X2D – C-130J loadmaster
    - 1A1X2E – WC-130J loadmaster
    - 1A1X2F – E-3 flight engineer
    - 1A1X2G – KC-46 boom operator
    - 1A1X2H – KC-135 boom operator
    - 1A1X2I – KC-10 boom operator
    - 1A1X2J – KC-10 flight engineer
    - 1A1X2K – E-8 flight engineer
    - 1A1X2L – C-130H flight engineer
    - 1A1X2N – C-130H loadmaster
    - 1A1X2O – EC-130H flight engineer
    - 1A1X2Z – Data mask mobility force aviator
  - 1A1X3 – Special mission aviator
    - 1A1X3A – AC-130J gunner
    - 1A1X3B – CV-22 flight engineer
    - 1A1X3C – UH-1N flight engineer
    - 1A1X3D – HC-130J loadmaster
    - 1A1X3E – MC-130J loadmaster
    - 1A1X3F – HH-60 flight engineer
    - 1A1X3G – MH-139 flight engineer
    - 1A1X3H – C-146 loadmaster
    - 1A1X3Z – SMA data masked
  - 1A1X4 – Multi-Domain Operations Aviator
  - 1A1X8 – Executive mission aviator
    - 1A1X8A – C-32/C-40 flight attendant
    - 1A1X8B – C-32/C-40 communications systems operator
    - 1A1X8C – C-37 flight attendant
    - 1A1X8D – C-37 flight engineer
    - 1A1X8E – CEM executive mission aviator
    - 1A1X8F – C-37 communications systems operator
    - 1A1X8G – E-4 flight engineer
    - 1A1X8H – E-4 flight attendant
    - 1A1X8I – E-4 communications systems operator/technician/controller
    - 1A1X8J – Presidential Airlift Group, flight engineer
    - 1A1X8K – Presidential Airlift Group, flight attendant
    - 1A1X8L – Presidential Airlift Group, communication system operator
    - 1A1X8Z – EMA data mask
  - 1A3X1 – Airborne mission systems specialist
    - 1A3X1A – C-32/C-40
    - 1A3X1D – C-37
    - 1A3X1G – HC-130P/N
    - 1A3X1H – EC-130J
    - 1A3X1I – E-3
    - 1A3X1J – E-4
    - 1A3X1K – E-8
    - 1A3X1L – EC-130H
    - 1A3X1N – RC-135
    - 1A3X1O – RQ-4
    - 1A3X1T – MC-130P
  - 1A890 – SEL airborne intelligence, surveillance and reconnaissance (ISR)
  - 1A8X1 – Airborne cryptologic language analyst
    - 1A8X1F – Arabic
    - 1A8X1G – Chinese
    - 1A8X1H – Korean
    - 1A8X1I – Russian
    - 1A8X1J – Spanish
    - 1A8X1K – Persian
    - 1A8X1M – Pashto
    - 1A8X1Z – Divested languages
  - 1A8X2 – Airborne intelligence, surveillance, and reconnaissance operator
- 1B – Cyber warfare
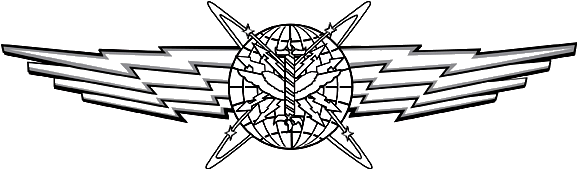
  - 1B4X1 – Cyber warfare operations
- 1C – Command and control systems operations
  - 1C0X2 – Aviation resource management
  - 1C1X1 – Air traffic control
  - 1C3X1 – All-domain command and control operations (C2 OPS)
  - 1C5X1 – Battle management ops
    - 1C5X1D – Weapons director
  - 1C6X1 – Space systems operations
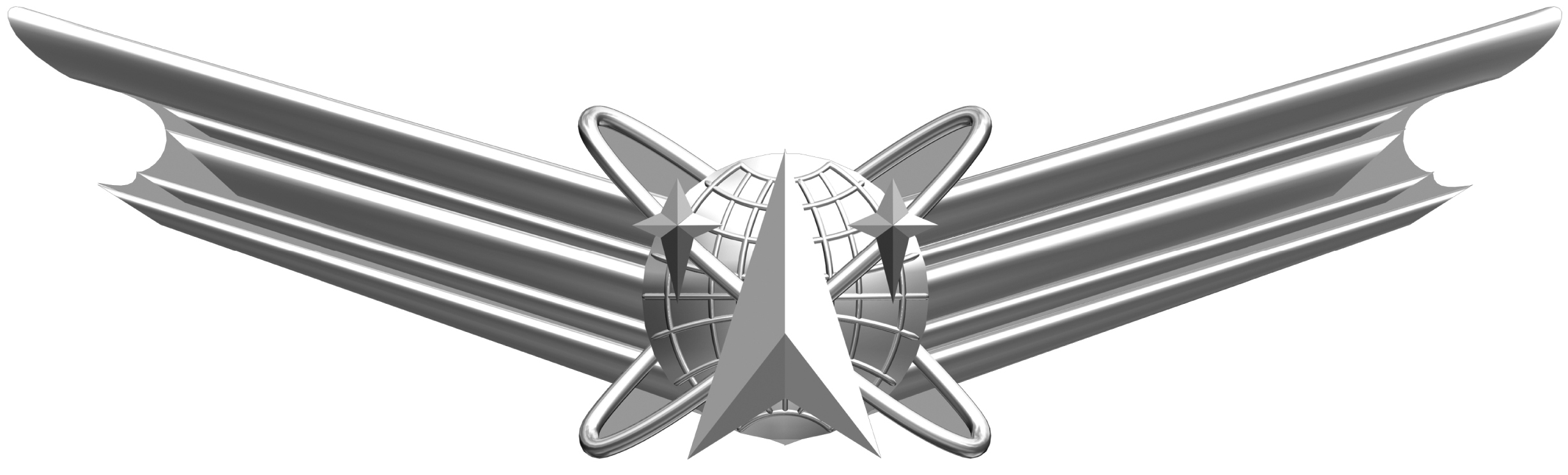
  - 1C7X1 – Airfield management
  - 1C8X3 – Radar, airfield & weather systems (RAWS)
- 1D – Warfighter Communication
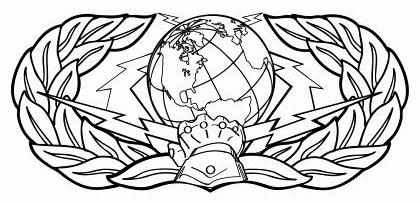
  - 1D7X1 – Information Technology Systems
    - 1D7X1A – Network Operations
    - 1D7X1B – Systems Administration
    - 1D7X1D – Security operations (to be phased out)
    - 1D7X1E – Client systems operations (to be phased out)
    - 1D7X1K – Knowledge operations (to be phased out)
    - 1D7X1M - Mission Defense Activities
    - 1D7X1P - Data Operations
    - 1D7X1Q - Enterprise Operations
    - 1D7X1W – Expeditionary communications (XCOMM)
    - 1D7X1Z – Software development operations (to be phased out)
  - 1D7X2 – Radio Frequency Transmissions and Electromagnetic Activities
    - 1D7X2F – Spectrum Operations
    - 1D7X2R – RF Transmissions
  - 1D7X3 – Cable and Antenna
  - 1D7X4 – Data Engineering
  - 1D7X5 – Cybersecurity
- 1H0X1 – Aerospace physiology
- 1N – Intelligence
  - 1N0X1 – All source intelligence analyst
  - 1N092 – Intelligence superintendent
  - 1N1X1 – Geospatial intelligence
    - 1N1X1A – Imagery analyst
  - 1N292 – Cryptologic intelligence superintendent
  - 1N2X1 – Signals intelligence
    - 1N2X1A – Electronic non-communications analyst
    - 1N2X1C – Communications analyst
  - 1N3X1 – Cryptologic language analyst
    - 1N3X1F – Arabic
    - 1N3X1G – Chinese
    - 1N3X1H – Korean
    - 1N3X1I – Russian
    - 1N3X1J – Spanish
    - 1N3X1K – Persian
    - 1N3X1M – Pashto
    - 1N3X1N – Urdu
    - 1N3X1Z – Divested languages
  - 1N4X1 – Cyber intelligence
    - 1N4X1A – Analyst
  - 1N4X2 – Cryptologic analyst & reporter
  - 1N7X1 – Human intelligence specialist
  - 1N8X1 – Targeting analyst

- 1P – Aircrew flight equipment
  - 1P0X1 – Aircrew flight equipment
    - 1P0X1A – Ejection seat aircraft
    - 1P0X1B – Non-ejection seat aircraft

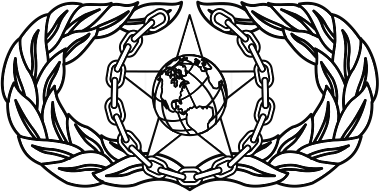

- 1S – Safety
  - 1S0X1 – Safety

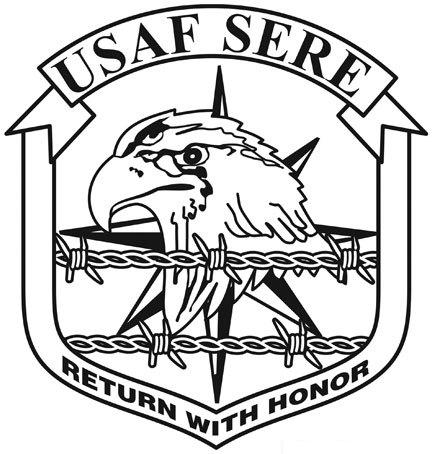

- 1T – Special warfare enabler
  - 1T0X1 – Survival, evasion, resistance, escape (SERE) specialist

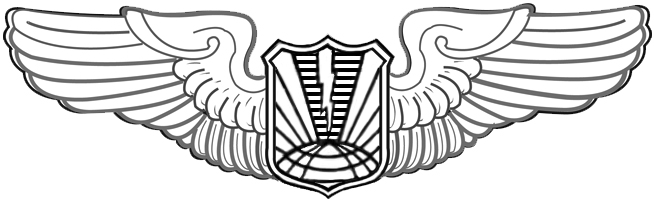

- 1U – Aircrew operations (RPA)
  - 1U1X1 – Remotely piloted aircraft (RPA) pilot
    - 1U1X1O – RQ-4
    - 1U1X1R – MQ-9

- 1W – Weather
  - 1W0X1 – Weather
    - 1W0X1A - Weather Forecaster

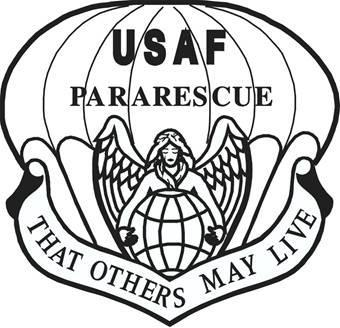

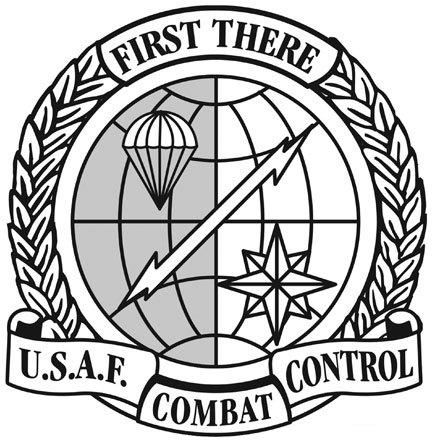

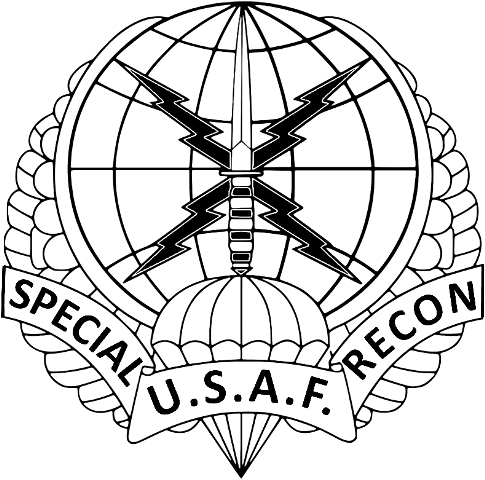

- 1Z – Special warfare
  - 1Z1X1 – Pararescue
  - 1Z2X1 – Combat control
  - 1Z3X1 – Tactical air control party (TACP)
  - 1Z4X1 – Special reconnaissance

=== Maintenance and logistics ===

- 2A – Aerospace maintenance
  - 2A090 – Avionics
  - 2A0X1 – Avionics test station, components, and electronic warfare systems
    - 2A0X1K – A-10/B-2/C-17/CV-22/F-16/AFSOC avionics systems
    - 2A0X1M – B-1/E-8/F-15 avionics systems
    - 2A0X1P – Avionics sensor systems and electronic warfare systems
  - 2A2X1 – MHU-139 electrical, environmental and avionics technician
  - 2A390 – Fighter/remotely piloted aircraft maintenance
  - 2A3X3 – Tactical aircraft maintenance
    - 2A3X3E – A-10/U-2
    - 2A3X3L – F-15
    - 2A3X3M – F-16
  - 2A3X4 – Fighter aircraft integrated avionics
    - 2A3X4A – A-10/U-2
    - 2A3X4B – F-15
    - 2A3X4C – F-16
  - 2A3X5 – Advanced fighter aircraft integrated avionics
    - 2A3X5A – F-22
    - 2A3X5B – F-35
    - 2A3X5C – MQ-1/MQ-9/RQ-4
  - 2A3X7 – Tactical aircraft maintenance (5th generation)
    - 2A3X7A – F-22
    - 2A3X7B – F-35
  - 2A3X8 – Remotely piloted aircraft maintenance
    - 2A3X8A – MQ-1/MQ-9
    - 2A3X8B – RQ-4
  - 2A5X1 – Airlift/special mission aircraft maintenance
    - 2A5X1A – C-20/C-21/C-22/C-37/C-40/E-4/VC-25
    - 2A5X1B – C-130/C-27J
    - 2A5X1C – C-5
    - 2A5X1D – C-17
  - 2A5X2 – Helicopter/tiltrotor aircraft maintenance
    - 2A5X2B – HH-60
    - 2A5X2D – CV-22
    - 2A5X2E – MHU-139
  - 2A5X4 – Refuel/bomber aircraft maintenance
    - 2A5X4A – Any C-135/E-3/E-8
    - 2A5X4B – KC-10
    - 2A5X4C – KC-46
    - 2A5X4D – B-52
    - 2A5X4E – B-1
    - 2A5X4F – B-2
    - 2A5X4H – B-21
  - 2A690 – Aircraft accessories
  - 2A6X1 – Aerospace propulsion
    - 2A6X1C – TF33, CF6, F103, F108, F117, TFE-731, TF39, PW 2040, F138 jet engines (airlift, special mission, and B-52 aircraft)
    - 2A6X1D – F100, F119, F135 jet engines (F-15, F16, F-22 aircraft)
    - 2A6X1E – F101, F110, F118, TF34 jet engines (A-10, B-1, B-2, F-16, U-2 aircraft)
    - 2A6X1F – F100, F101, F110, F118, F119, F135, TF34 jet engines (A-10, B-1, B-2, F-15, F-16, F-22, F-35, U-2 aircraft)
    - 2A6X1H – Turboprop and turboshaft propulsion (helicopter, propeller, tiltrotor aircraft)
  - 2A6X2 – Aerospace ground equipment (AGE)
  - 2A6X3 – Aircrew egress systems
  - 2A6X4 – Aircraft fuel systems
  - 2A6X5 – Aircraft hydraulic systems
  - 2A6X6 – Aircraft electrical and environmental systems
  - 2A790 – Aircraft fabrication
  - 2A7X1 – Aircraft metals technology
  - 2A7X2 – Nondestructive inspection
  - 2A7X3 – Aircraft structural maintenance
  - 2A7X5 – Low observable aircraft structural maintenance
  - 2A9X4 – Heavy aircraft integrated avionics
    - 2A9X4A – C4ISR mission systems (E-3, E-4, E-7, E-8, EC-130H, RC-135, VC-25)

- 2F – Fuels
  - 2F0X1 – Fuels

- 2G – Logistics plans
  - 2G0X1 – Logistics plans

- 2M – Missile and space systems maintenance
  - 2M090 – Missile and space systems maintenance superintendent
  - 2M0X1 – Missile and space systems electronic maintenance
    - 2M0X1A – ICBM
    - 2M0X1B – ALCM
  - 2M0X2 – Missile and space systems maintenance
  - 2M0X3 – Missile and space facilities
- 2P – Precision measurement equipment laboratory
  - 2P0X1 – Precision measurement equipment laboratory
- 2R – Maintenance management
  - 2R2X1 – Maintenance management
- 2S – Material management
  - 2S0X1 – Material management

- 2T – Transportation & vehicle management
  - 2T0X1 – Traffic management
  - 2T1X1 – Ground transportation
  - 2T2X1 – Air transportation
  - 2T390 – Vehicle management
  - 2T3X1 – Mission generation vehicular equipment maintenance
    - 2T3X1A – Firefighting and refueling vehicle & equipment maintenance
    - 2T3X1C – Material handling equipment (MHE)/463L maintenance
  - 2T3X7 – Fleet management and analysis

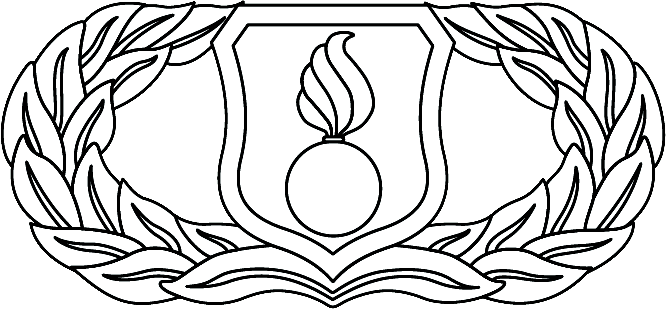

- 2W – Munitions & weapons
  - 2W0X1 – Munitions systems
  - 2W1X1 – Aircraft armament systems
    - 2W1X1C – A-10
    - 2W1X1E – F-15
    - 2W1X1F – F-16
    - 2W1X1J – F-35
    - 2W1X1K – B-52/B-2
    - 2W1X1L – B-1
    - 2W1X1N – F-22
    - 2W1X1Q – MQ-1/MQ-9
    - 2W1X1Z – All other
  - 2W2X1 – Nuclear weapons

=== Support ===

- 3E – Civil engineering
  - 3E090 – Facility systems
  - 3E0X1 – Electrical systems
  - 3E0X2 – Electrical power production
  - 3E1X1 – Heating, ventilation, AC, and refrigeration
  - 3E290 – Heavy repair
  - 3E2X1 – Pavements and construction equipment
  - 3E3X1 – Structural
  - 3E490 – Infrastructure systems
  - 3E4X1 – Water and fuel systems maintenance
    - 3E4X1A – Fuel systems maintenance
  - 3E4X3 – Pest management
  - 3E5X1 – Engineering
  - 3E6X1 – Operations management
  - 3E7X1 – Fire protection
  - 3E8X1 – Explosive ordnance disposal
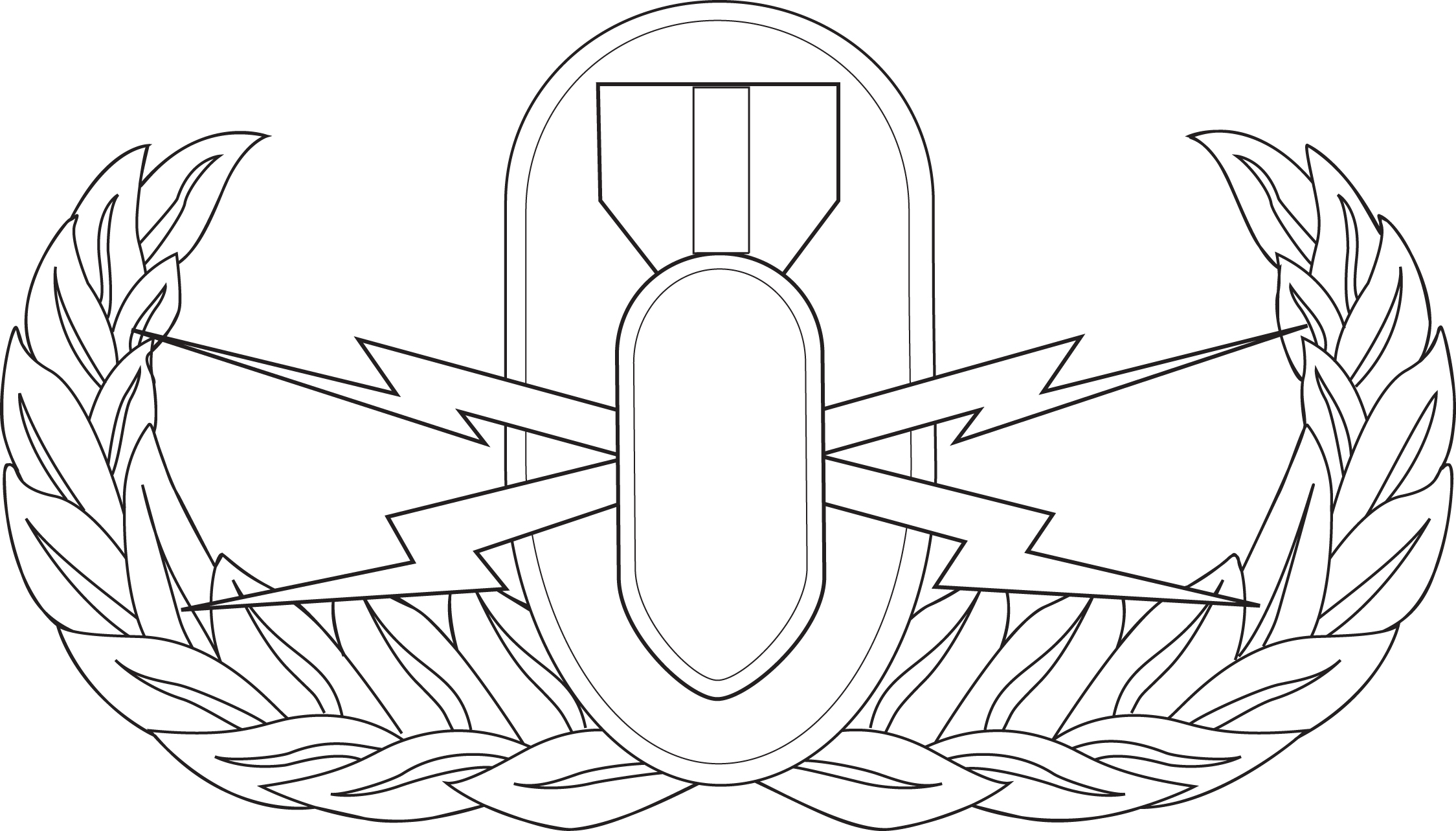
    USAF EOD Basic Occupational Badge
  - 3E9X1 – Emergency management
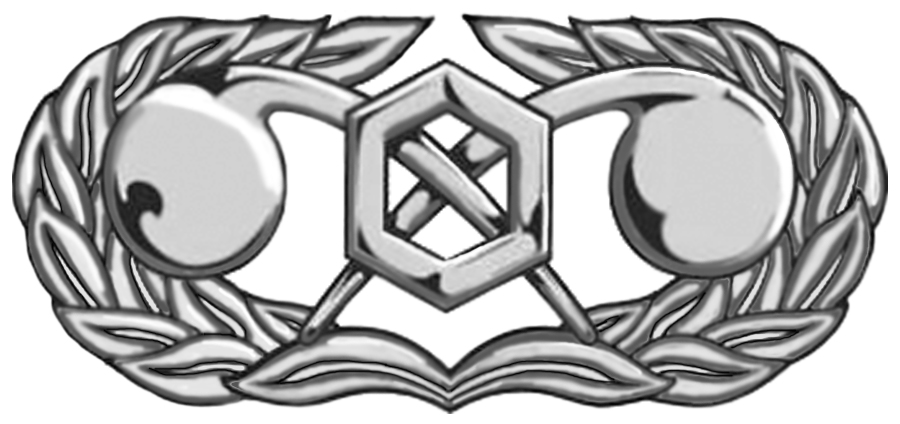
- 3F – Force support
  - 3F0X1 – Human Resources & Administration
  - 3F1X1 – Services
  - 3F2X1 – Education and training
  - 3F3X1 – Manpower
  - 3F4X1 – Equal opportunity
- 3G – Talent acquisition
  - 3G0X1 – Talent acquisition
- 3H – Historian
  - 3H0X1 – Historian
- 3N – Public affairs
  - 3N090 – Public affairs superintendent
  - 3N0X6 – Public affairs
  - 3N1X1 – Regional band
    - 3N1X1A – Clarinet
    - 3N1X1B – Saxophone
    - 3N1X1C – Bassoon
    - 3N1X1D – Oboe
    - 3N1X1E – Flute
    - 3N1X1F – Horn
    - 3N1X1G – Trumpet
    - 3N1X1H – Euphonium
    - 3N1X1J – Trombone
    - 3N1X1K – Tuba
    - 3N1X1L – Percussion
    - 3N1X1M – Piano
    - 3N1X1N – Guitar
    - 3N1X1P – Arranger
    - 3N1X1Q – Jazz trumpet
    - 3N1X1R – Vocalist
    - 3N1X1S – String/electric bass
    - 3N1X1U – Drum set
    - 3N1X1V – Audio engineer
    - 3N1X1Z – Instrumentalist, general (Air National Guard bands)
  - 3N2X1 – Premier band – The United States Air Force Band
  - 3N3X1 – Premier band – The United States Air Force Academy Band
- 3P – Security forces
  - 3P0X1 – Security forces
    - 3P0X1A – Military working dog handler
    - 3P0X1B – Combat arms

=== Medical ===

- Medical
  - 4A0X1 – Health services management
    - 4A0X1S – Health information technology
  - 4A1X1 – Medical material
  - 4A2X1 – Biomedical equipment
  - 4B0X1 – Bioenvironmental engineering
  - 4C0X1 – Mental health service
  - 4D0X1 – Diet therapy
  - 4E0X1 – Public health
  - 4H0X1 – Respiratory care practitioner
  - 4J0X2 – Physical medicine
    - 4J0X2A – Orthotics
  - 4N0X1 – Aerospace medical service
    - 4N0X1B – Neurodiagnostic medical technician
    - 4N0X1C – Independent duty medical technician
    - 4N0X1D – Allergy/immunization technician
    - 4N0X1F – Flight and operational medical technician
    - 4N0X1G – Aeromedical evacuation technician
    - 4N0X1H – National registry paramedic
  - 4N1X1 – Surgical technologist
    - 4N1X1B – Urology
    - 4N1X1C – Orthopedics
    - 4N1X1D – Otolaryngology
  - 4P0X1 – Pharmacy
  - 4R0X1 – Diagnostic imaging
    - 4R0X1A – Nuclear medicine
    - 4R0X1B – Diagnostic medical sonography
    - 4R0X1C – Magnetic resonance imaging
  - 4T090 – Medical laboratory
  - 4T0X1 – Medical laboratory
  - 4T0X2 – Histopathology
  - 4V0X1 – Ophthalmic
    - 4V0X1S – Ophthalmology
- Dental
  - 4Y090 – Dental
  - 4Y0X1 – Dental assistant
    - 4Y0X1H – Dental hygienist
  - 4Y0X2 – Dental laboratory

=== Professional ===

- 5J – Paralegal
  - 5J0X1 – Paralegal
- 5R – Religious affairs
  - 5R0X1 – Religious affairs

=== Acquisition ===

- 6C – Contracting
  - 6C0X1 – Contracting
- 6F – Financial
  - 6F0X1 – Financial management and comptroller

=== Special Investigations ===
- 7S – Special investigations (OSI)
  - 7S0X1 – Special investigations

=== Special duty identifiers ===
- 8A200 – Enlisted aide
- 8A300 – Protocol
- 8A400 – Talent management consultant
- 8B000 – Military training instructor
- 8B100 – Military Training leader
- 8B200 – Academy military training NCO
- 8B300 – Officer accessions instructor
- 8C000 – Military and family readiness non-commissioned officer (RNCO)
- 8D100 – Language & culture advisor
- 8F000 – First sergeant
- 8G000 – Premier honor guard
  - 8G000B – Pallbearer
  - 8G000C – Color guard
  - 8G000D – Drill team
- 8G100 – Base honor guard program manager
- 8H000 – Airmen dorm leader
- 8I000 – Superintendent, inspector general
- 8I100 – Inspections coordinator
- 8I200 – Complaints & resolution coordinator
- 8K000 – Software development specialist
- 8L100 – Air advisor basic
- 8L200 – Air advisor basic, team sergeant
- 8L300 – Air advisor basic, team leader
- 8L400 – Air advisor advanced
- 8L500 – Air advisor advanced, team sergeant
- 8L600 – Air advisor advanced, team leader
- 8L700 – Combat aviation advisor
- 8L800 – Combat aviation advisor team sergeant
- 8L900 – Combat aviation advisor team leader
- 8P000 – Courier
- 8P100 – Defense attaché
- 8R000 – Enlisted accessions recruiter
- 8R200 – Second-tier recruiter
- 8R300 – Third-tier recruiter
  - 8R300A – Flight chief
  - 8R300B – Graduated, flight chief
  - 8R300C – Production superintendent
  - 8R300E – Senior enlisted leader
- 8S000 – Missile facility manager
- 8S200 – Combat crew communications
- 8T000 – Professional military education instructor
- 8T100 – Enlisted professional military education instructional system designer
- 8T200 – Development advisor
- 8U000 – Unit deployment manager
- 8U100 – Weapons of mass destruction civil support team (WMD-CST)
- 8W000 – Weapons safety manager – wing level
- 8X100 – Operational STEM Specialist
- 8Y000 – Pathfinder

=== Reporting identifiers ===
- 9A000 – Enlisted airman/guardian – disqualified for reasons beyond control
- 9A100 – Enlisted airman/guardian – disqualified for reasons within control
- 9A200 – Enlisted airman/guardian awaiting discharge, separation, or retirement for reasons within their control
- 9A300 – Enlisted airman/guardian awaiting discharge, separation, or retirement for reasons beyond their control
- 9A400 – Disqualified airman/guardian, return to duty program
- 9A500 – Enlisted airman/guardian temporarily ineligible for retraining – disqualified for reasons beyond control
- 9B000 – Senior enlisted advisor to the chairman of the joint chiefs of staff
- 9B100 – Senior enlisted advisor to the chief of the National Guard Bureau
- 9C000 – Chief Master Sergeant of the Air Force
- 9C100 – Executive assistant to the Chief Master Sergeant of the Air Force
- 9D100 – AF developmental senior enlisted positions
- 9D200 – Key developmental senior enlisted positions
- 9E000 – Command Chief Master Sergeant
- 9E100 – Command chief executive assistant
- 9E200 – Individual Mobilization Augmentee to Command Chief Master Sergeant
- 9F000 – First term airmen center (FTAC) NCOIC
- 9G100 – Group senior enlisted leader
- 9H000 – Academic faculty instructor
- 9H100 – White House communications agency technician (WHCA)
- 9I000 – Futures airmen
- 9J000 – Prisoner
- 9L000 – Interpreter/translator
- 9L100 – Enlisted international affairs manager
- 9M000 – Military entrance processing command (MEPCOM) senior enlisted advisor
- 9M200 – International health specialists (IHS)
- 9M400 – Chief, medical enlisted force (CMEF)
- 9N000 – Secretary of the Air Force enlisted legislative fellows
- 9P000 – Patient
- 9Q000 – Reserve force generation and oversight NCO
- 9R000 – Civil Air Patrol (CAP) – USAF reserve assistance NCO

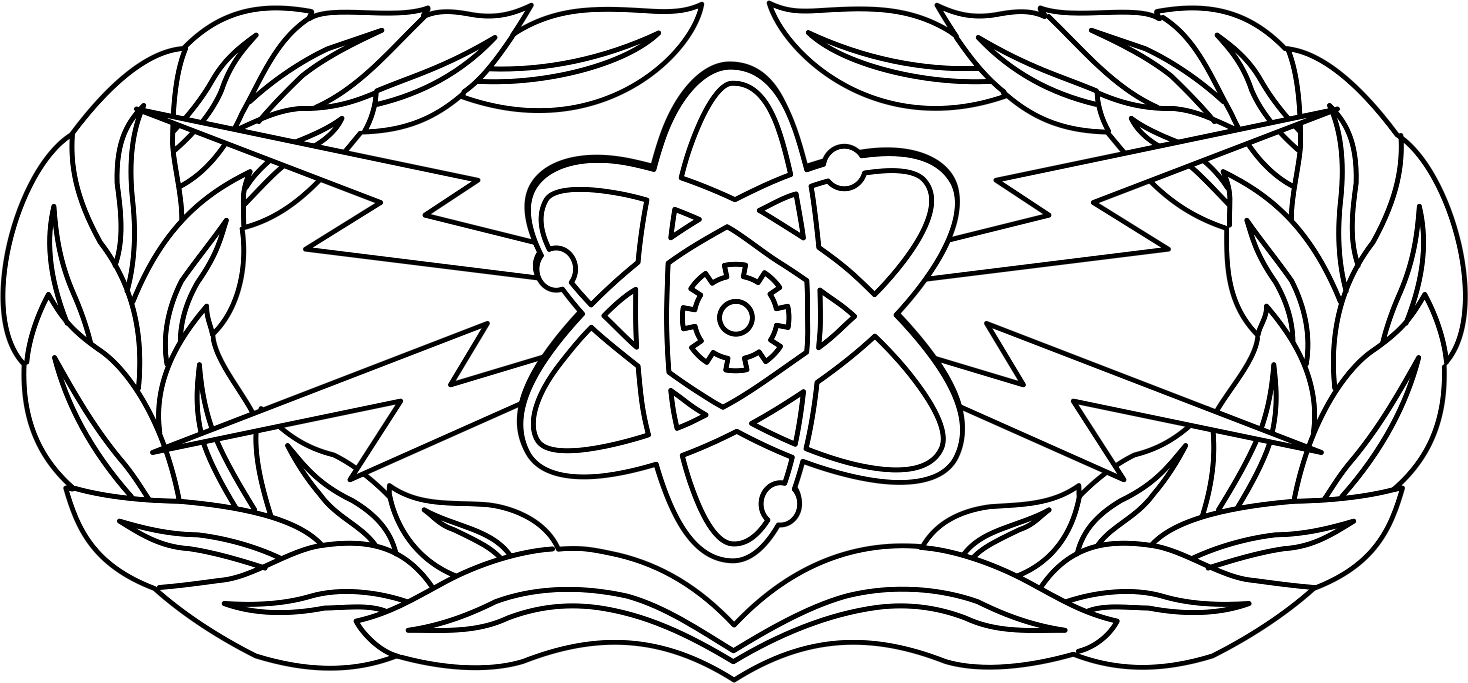

- 9S100 – Scientific applications specialist
- 9T000 – Basic enlisted airman
- 9T100 – Officer trainee
- 9T200 – Precadet assignee
- 9T400 – AFIT/EWI enlisted student
- 9T500 – Basic special warfare enlisted airman
- 9U000 – Enlisted airman/guardian ineligible for local utilization
- 9U100 – Unallotted enlisted authorization
- 9V000 – Key developmental joint senior enlisted position
- 9V100 – Executive assistant to the senior enlisted advisor to the chairman of the Joint Chiefs of Staff
- 9W000 – Combat wounded warrior
- 9W100 – Reserved for future use
- 9W200 – Combat wounded warrior with exemptions
- 9W300 – Non-combat wounded warrior
- 9W400 – Wounded warrior – limited assignment status (LAS)
- 9W500 – Reserved for future use
- 9W600 – Reserved for future use
- 9W700 – Reserved for future use
- 9W800 – Wounded warrior – ambassador
- 9W900 – Wounded warrior – project planner/officer
- 9Y000 – Air force parachute team (AFPT) instructor
- 9Z000 – Special warfare mission support (SWMS) career field manager (CFM) on headquarters Air Force staff, Air Force Special Warfare Division
- 9Z100 – Special warfare mission support (SWMS) senior enlisted leader, Air Force Special Warfare (AFSPECWAR)
- 9Z200 – Special warfare mission support (SWMS) superintendent, Air Force Special Warfare (AFSPECWAR)

=== No longer in use ===
- 1C0X1 – Airfield management
- 1C8X1 – Ground radar
- 1C8X2 – Airfield systems
- 1N5X1 – Electronic signals intelligence exploitation apprentice
- 1N6X1 – Electronic systems security assessment apprentice
- 1D7X1R – RF operations (shred eliminated May 2025)
- 1D7X1Q – Enterprise operations (shred eliminated May 2025)
- 1D7X1M – Mission defense activities, then cybersecurity in November 2024 (shred eliminated May 2025 after direct conversion to 1D7X5)
- 1D7X1P – Data operations (shred eliminated May 2025, became 1D7X4 data engineering)
- 1U0X1 – Sensor operator
  - 1U0X1N – RQ-4
  - 1U0X1Q – MQ-1
  - 1U0X1R – MQ-9
  - 1U0X1T – MC-12
  - 1U0X1U – AC-130U
  - 1U0X1V – AC-130J
  - 1U0X1W – AC-130W
  - 1U0X1Y – CAA
- 2A5X3 – Mobility air forces electronic warfare systems
- 2R0X1 – Maintenance management analysis (merged with 2R1X1 in 2024)
- 2R1X1 – Maintenance management production (merged with 2R0X1 in 2024)
- 3C – Communications (deactivated on 1 November 2009 and replaced by 3DXXX)
  - 3C0X1 – Communications – computer systems operations
  - 3C2X1 – Communications – computer systems control
- 3D – Cyberspace support (activated on 1 November 2009, merging 2EXXX, 3AXXX, and 3CXXX; deactivated on 1 November 2021 and replaced by 1D7XX)
  - 3D0X1 – Knowledge operations management
  - 3D0X2 – Cyber systems operations
  - 3D0X3 – Cyber surety (IA which includes COMSEC, EMSEC, and COMPUSEC)
  - 3D0X4 – Computer systems programming
  - 3D1X1 – Client systems
  - 3D1X2 – Cyber transport systems
    - 3D1X2R – Data links
  - 3D1X3 – RF transmission systems
  - 3D1X4 – Spectrum operations
  - 3D1X7 – Cable and antenna systems
  - 3D190 – Cyberspace support superintendent (merged with 3D090 in 2015)
  - 3D100 – Chief enlisted manager
- 3N0X2 – Broadcast journalist (merged with 3N0X6 effective 1 October 2020)
- 3N0X5 – Photojournalist (merged with 3N0X6 effective 1 October 2020)
- 4M0X1 – Aerospace and operational physiology (renamed 1H0X1)
- 8M000 – Postal service

== Officer AFSCs ==
The officer AFSC consists of four alphanumeric characters:

- Career group (numerical)
  - 1 (operations)
  - 2 (logistics)
  - 3 (support)
  - 4 (medical)
  - 5 (professional services)
  - 6 (acquisition)
  - 7 (special investigations)
  - 8 (special duty identifier)
  - 9 (reporting identifier)
- Utilization field (numerical, different for each)
- Functional area (alpha, different for each)
- Qualification level
  - 0 – Qualified commander (when used in conjunction with "C" in the 3rd position)
  - 1 – Entry (any AFSC)
  - 2 – Intermediate (is only used for pilots, bomber navigators, missile launch officers, and cyberspace officers)
  - 3 – Qualified (any AFSC)
  - 4 – Staff (relates only to the level of functional responsibility and is restricted to positions above wing level; it does not denote additional specialty qualifications)

For example, in the AFSC 11M4:

- The career group is 11 (pilot)
- The functional area is M (mobility)
- The qualification level is 4 (staff)

For example, in the AFSC T63A3:

- The career group is 63 (acquisition manager)
- The functional area is A (all 63 officers are "A")
- The qualification level is 3 (fully qualified)
- The prefix "T" designates a formal training instructor (other prefixes are available for other specialty positions)

For example, in the AFSC 45A1:

- The career group is 4 (medical)
- The utilization field is 5 (surgery)
- The functional area is A (anesthesiology)
- The qualification level is 1 (entry; in this case, denoting a medical resident undergoing graduate medical education in anesthesiology)

As with enlisted AFSCs, prefixes and suffixes may be applied to make the AFSC more specific.

=== Operations ===
- 10C0 – Operations commander
- 11 – Pilot
  - 11BX – Bomber pilot
    - 11BXA – B-1
    - 11BXB – B-2
    - 11BXC – B-52
    - 11BXD – B-21
    - 11BXU – Air liaison officer (ALO)
    - 11BXY – General
    - 11BXZ – Other
  - 11EX – Experimental test pilot
    - 11EXA – Airlift/tanker/bomber
    - 11EXB – Fighter
    - 11EXC – Helicopter/VSTOL
    - 11EXD – Airlift
    - 11EXE – Tanker
    - 11EXF – Bomber
    - 11EXG – RPA
    - 11EXQ – Mission support (T-38, etc.)
    - 11EXY – General
    - 11EXZ – Other
  - 11FX – Fighter pilot
    - 11FXB – A-10
    - 11FXF – F-15
    - 11FXG – F-15E
    - 11FXH – F-16
    - 11FXJ – F-22
    - 11FXN – F-35
    - 11FXQ – IFF (AT-38/T-38C)
    - 11FXU – Air liaison officer (ALO)
    - 11FXY – General
    - 11FXZ – Other
  - 11GX – Generalist pilot
  - 11HX – Rescue pilot
    - 11HXC – UH-1N
    - 11HXE – HH-60
    - 11HXF – CSAR-X
    - 11HXG – MH-139
    - 11HXJ – HC-130J
    - 11HXP – HC-130P/N
    - 11HXW – Combat search and rescue, general
    - 11HXY – General
    - 11HXZ – Other
  - 11KX – Trainer pilot
    - 11KXA – T-1
    - 11KXD – T-38
    - 11KXF – T-6
    - 11KXH – T-44/TC-12
    - 11KXJ – SUPT-H
    - 11KXM – AETC air mobility fundamentals course instructor
    - 11KXQ – T-7
    - 11KXY – General
    - 11KXZ – Other
  - 11MX – Mobility pilot
    - 11MXA – C-5
    - 11MXB – C-130E/H
    - 11MXC – C-130J
    - 11MXD – C-27J (JCA)
    - 11MXE – VC-25
    - 11MXF – KC-135
    - 11MXG – KC-10
    - 11MXJ – C-12
    - 11MXK – C-17
    - 11MXL – C-20/C-37
    - 11MXM – C-21
    - 11MXN – C-26
    - 11MXP – C-32
    - 11MXQ – C-40
    - 11MXR – KC-46
    - 11MXS – Airlift, general
    - 11MXT – Tanker, general
    - 11MXU – Air mobility liaison officer
    - 11MXV – Inter-theater airlift, general
    - 11MXW – Intra-theater airlift, general
    - 11MXY – General
    - 11MXZ – Other
  - 11RX – Reconnaissance/surveillance/electronic warfare pilot
    - 11RXA – E-3
    - 11RXB – E-4
    - 11RXC – EC-130
    - 11RXE – WC-130
    - 11RXG – RC-135
    - 11RXH – WC/OC-135
    - 11RXJ – TR-1/U-2
    - 11RXL – E-8
    - 11RXM – MC-12
    - 11RXN – RC-26B
    - 11RXS – E-7
    - 11RXY – General
    - 11RXZ – Other
  - 11SX – Special operations pilot
    - 11SXC – AC-130H
    - 11SXD – AC-130U
    - 11SXE – MC-130P
    - 11SXF – MC-130E
    - 11SXG – MC-130H
    - 11SXI – CAA (fixed wing)
    - 11SXJ – CV-22
    - 11SXM – Air commando (NSAv, DM)
    - 11SXN – AC-130W
    - 11SXP – MC-130J
    - 11SXQ – AC-130J
    - 11SXS – EC-130J
    - 11SXU – Air liaison officer (ALO)
    - 11SXX – U-28
    - 11SXY – General
    - 11SXZ – Other
  - 11TX – Student pilot
    - 11TXA – T-1
    - 11TXD – T-38
    - 11TXF – T-6
    - 11TXG – T-7
    - 11TXH – T-96
    - 11TXJ – TH-1
    - 11TXZ – Other
  - 11UX – Remotely piloted aircraft (RPA) pilot
    - 11UXA – MQ-1
    - 11UXB – MQ-9
    - 11UXC – RQ-4
    - 11UXE – RQ-170
    - 11UXS – Special operations
    - 11UXU – Air liaison officer (ALO)
  - 11UXY – General
    - 11UXZ – Other
- 12 – Combat system officer
  - 12BX – Bomber combat systems officer
    - 12BXC – B-1 WSO
    - 12BXD – B-52 EWO
    - 12BXE – B-52 WSO
    - 12BXU – Air liaison officer (ALO)
    - 12BXW – EWO, general
    - 12BXY – General
    - 12BXZ – Other
  - 12EX – Experimental test combat systems officer
    - 12EXA – Airlift/tanker/bomber
    - 12EXB – Fighter
    - 12EXD – Airlift
    - 12EXE – Tanker
    - 12EXF – Bomber
    - 12EXG – RPA
    - 12EXW – EWO, general
    - 12EXY – General
    - 12EXZ – Other
  - 12FX – Fighter weapon systems officer
    - 12FXF – F-15E WSO
    - 12FXG – F-15E EWO
    - 12FXQ – T-7
    - 12FXU – Air liaison officer (ALO)
    - 12FXV – EA-18G
    - 12FXW – EWO, general
    - 12FXY – General
    - 12FXZ – Other
  - 12GX – Generalist combat systems officer
    - 12GXW – EWO
  - 12HX – Rescue combat systems officer
    - 12HXJ – HC-130J
    - 12HXP – HC-130
    - 12HXY – General
    - 12HXZ – Other
  - 12KX – Trainer combat systems officer
    - 12KXA – SUNT, navigator general
    - 12KXB – SUNT, EWO
    - 12KXC – SUNT, WSO
    - 12KXD – Instructor, undergraduate CSO training
    - 12KXY – General
    - 12KXZ – Other
  - 12MX – Mobility combat systems officer
    - 12MXB – C-130E/H
    - 12MXE – VC-25
    - 12MXF – KC-135
    - 12MXS – Airlift, general
    - 12MXT – Tanker, general
    - 12MXU – Air mobility liaison officer (AMLO)
    - 12MXV – Inter-theater airlift, general
    - 12MXW – Intra-theater airlift, general
    - 12MXY – General
    - 12MXZ – Other
  - 12RX – Reconnaissance/surveillance/electronic warfare combat systems officer
    - 12RXA – E-3
    - 12RXB – E-4
    - 12RXC – EC-130 EWO
    - 12RXD – EC-130
    - 12RXF – WC-130
    - 12RXH – RC-135 EWO
    - 12RXJ – RC-135
    - 12RXK – WC/OC-135
    - 12RXL – E-8
    - 12RXN – RC-26B
    - 12RXS – E-7 EWO
    - 12RXW – EWO, general
    - 12RXY – General
    - 12RXZ – Other
  - 12SX – Special operations combat systems officer
    - 12SXA – AC-130H EWO
    - 12SXB – AC-130H FCO
    - 12SXC – AC-130H
    - 12SXD – AC-130U EWO
    - 12SXE – AC-130U FCO
    - 12SXF – AC-130U
    - 12SXG – MC-130P
    - 12SXH – MC-130E EWO
    - 12SXJ – MC-130E
    - 12SXK – MC-130H EWO
    - 12SXL – MC-130H
    - 12SXM – Air commando (CAA, NSAv, DM)
    - 12SXN – AC-130W
    - 12SXO – AC-130W FCO
    - 12SXP – MC-130J
    - 12SXQ – AC-130J CSO
    - 12SXR – AC-130J WSO
    - 12SXS – EC-130J
    - 12SXU – Air liaison officer
    - 12SXW – EWO, general
    - 12SXX – U-28
    - 12SXY – General
    - 12SXZ – Other
  - 12UX – Remotely piloted aircraft (RPA)
    - 12UXA – MQ-1
    - 12UXB – MQ-9
    - 12UXC – RQ-4
    - 12UXE – RQ-170
    - 12UXS – Special operations
    - 12UXU – Air liaison officer
    - 12UXY – General
    - 12UXZ – Other
- 13 – Space, nuclear and missile operations, & command and control
  - 13AX – Astronaut
  - 13BX – Air battle manager
    - 13BXB – AWACS
    - 13BXC – Air defense
    - 13BXD – Mobile air control
    - 13BXE – Flight test
    - 13BXK – JSTARS
    - 13BXM – Trainer (UABMT)
    - 13BXS – E-7
    - 13BXU – Air liaison officer (ALO)
    - 13BXY – General
    - 13BXZ – Other

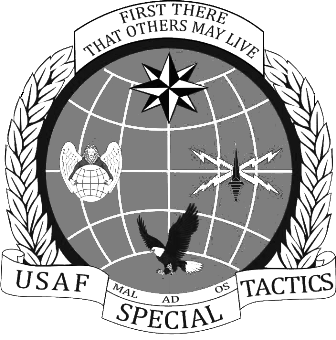
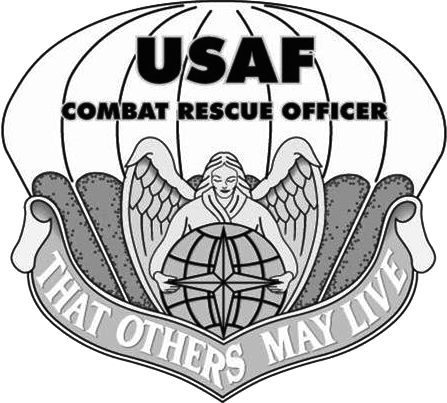

  - 13HX – Aerospace physiologist
  - 13MX – Airfield operations
  - 13NX – Nuclear and missile operations

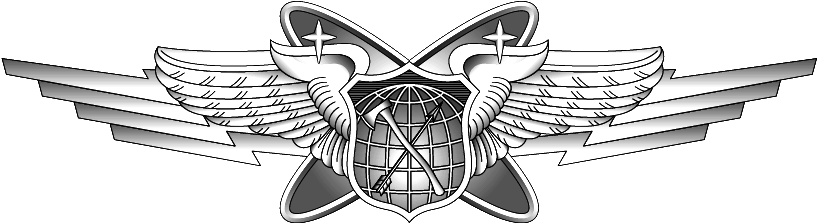

  - 13OX – Multi-domain warfare officer
  - 13SX – Space operations
    - 13SXA – Orbital warfare
    - 13SXB – Space electronic warfare
    - 13SXD – Space battle management
    - 13SXE – Space access and sustainment
  - 13ZX – Rated multi-domain warfare officer

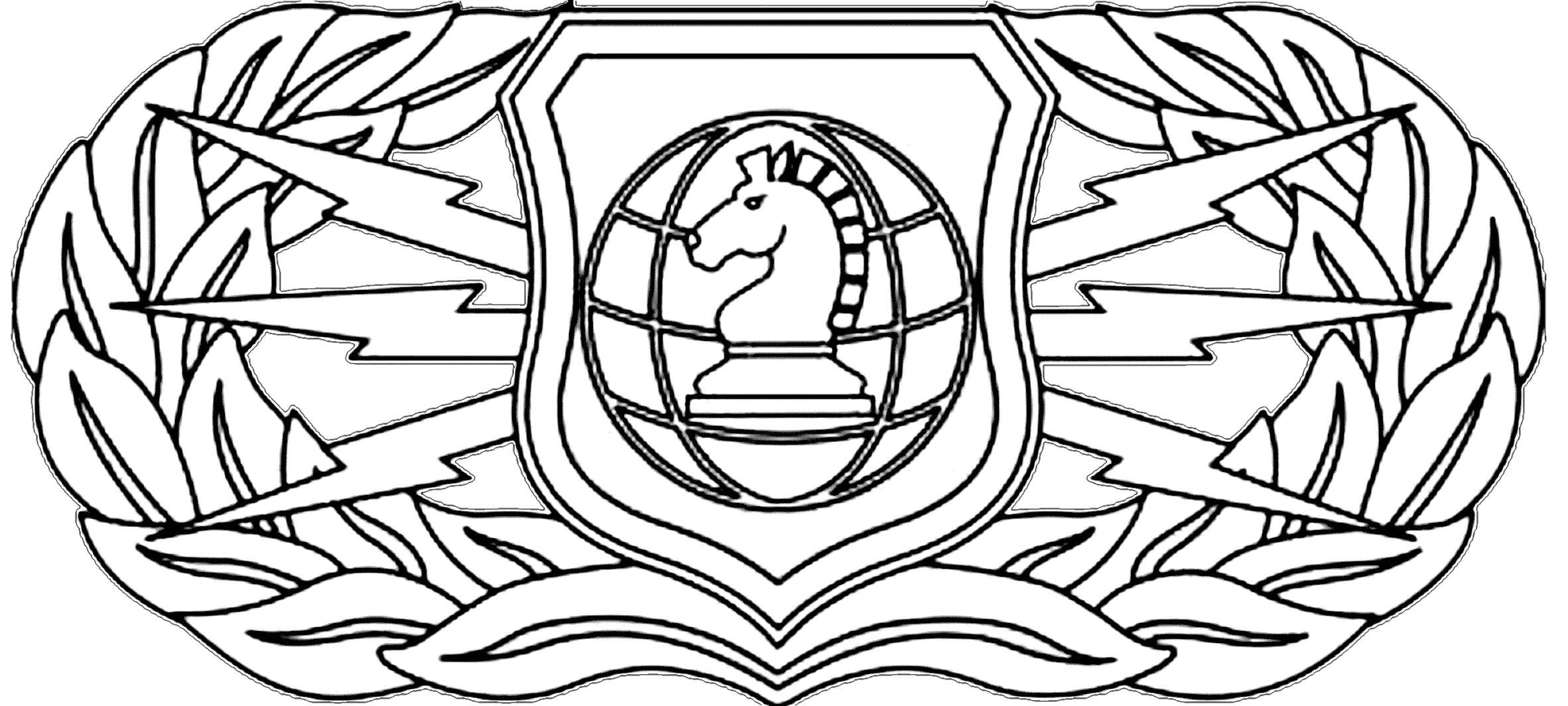

- 14F – Information operations
  - 14FX – Information operations
- 14N – Intelligence
  - 14NX – Intelligence

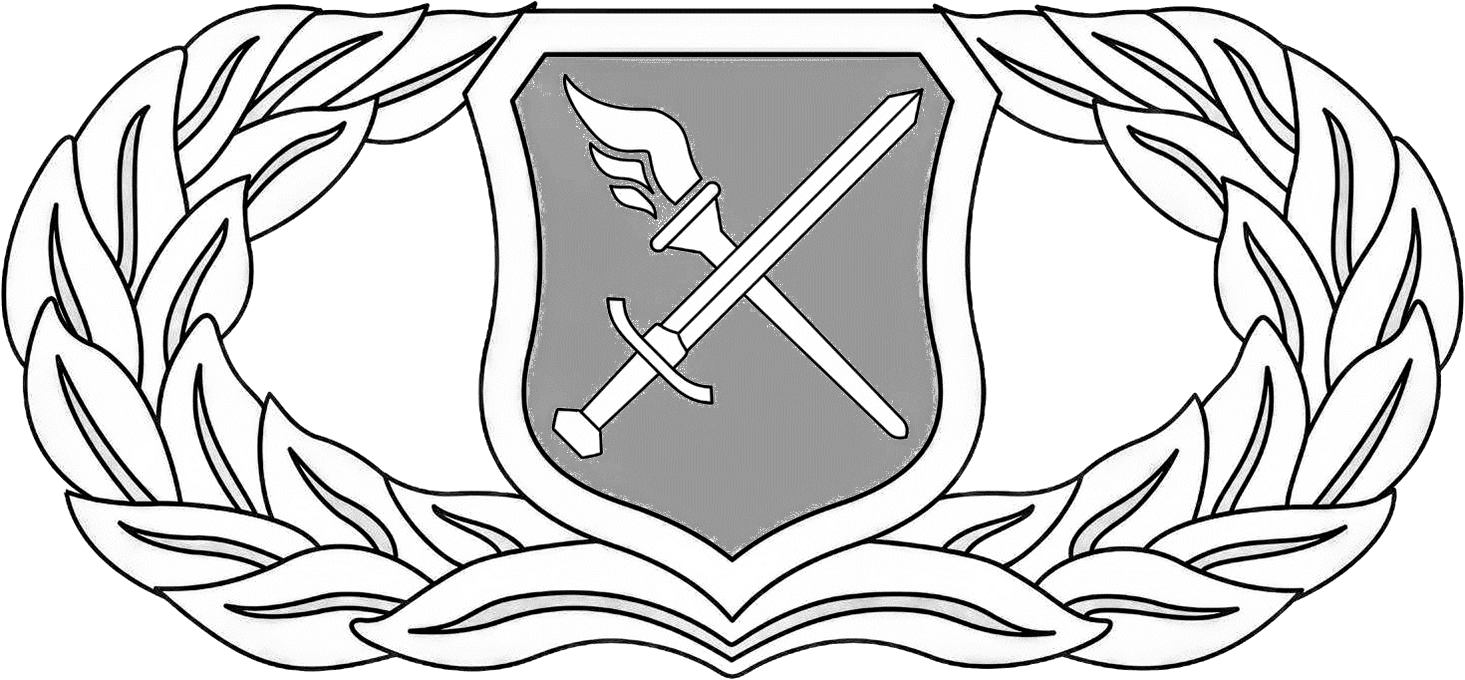

- 15A – Operations analysis and data science
  - 15AX – Operations analysis officer

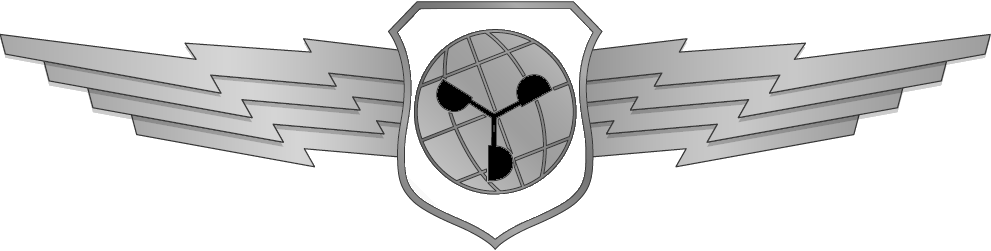

- 15W – Weather and environmental sciences
  - 15WX – Weather and environmental sciences
    - 15WXA – Advanced weather activities
- 16 – Operations support
  - 16FX – Foreign area officer (FAO)
    - 16FXC – SOUTHCOM
    - 16FXD – INDOPACOM
    - 16FXF – CENTCOM
    - 16FXG – AFRICOM
    - 16FXH – EUCOM
    - 16FXL – Generalist
  - 16GX – Air force operations staff officer
  - 16KX – Software development officer (SDO)
    - 16KXD – Product designer
    - 16KXE – Software engineer
    - 16KXM – Product manager
    - 16KXS – Data scientist
  - 16PX – Political-military affairs strategist (PAS)
  - 16RX – Planning and programming
  - 16ZX – Rated foreign area officer (FAO)
    - 16ZXC – SOUTHCOM
    - 16ZXD – INDOPACOM
    - 16ZXF – CENTCOM
    - 16ZXG – AFRICOM
    - 16ZXH – EUCOM
    - 16ZXL – Generalist (applies only to billets)
- 17 – Cyberspace warfare operations
  - 17CX – Cyberspace warfare operations commander
  - 17DX – Warfighter communications operations
    - 17DXA – Network operations
    - 17DXB – Expeditionary communications operations
    - 17DXT – Technical track
    - 17DXY – General
  - 17SX – Cyberspace effects operations
    - 17SXA – Offensive cyberspace operator
    - 17SXB – Defensive cyberspace operator
    - 17SXT – Technical track
  - 17WX – Warfighter communications & IT systems operations
    - 17WXC – Cybersecurity specialist
    - 17WXD – Data operations specialist
    - 17WXI – Information technology specialist
  - 17YX – Cyber effects & warfare
    - 17YXA – Cyber warfare analyst
    - 17YXC – Cyber capability developer
    - 17YXD – Cyber threat defense analyst
    - 17YXO – Cyber attack operator
    - 17YXI – Cyber threat defense integrator
- 18 – Remotely piloted aircraft pilot
  - 18AX – Attack remotely piloted aircraft pilot
    - 18AXA – MQ-1
    - 18AXB – MQ-9
    - 18AXU – Air liaison officer (ALO)
    - 18AXY – General
    - 18AXZ – Other
  - 18EX – Experimental test remotely piloted aircraft pilot
    - 18EXA – Attack
    - 18EXB – Reconnaissance
    - 18EXC – Special operations
    - 18EXY – General
    - 18EXZ – Other
  - 18GX – Generalist remotely piloted aircraft pilot
  - 18RX – Reconnaissance remotely piloted aircraft pilot
    - 18RXC – RQ-4
    - 18RXE – RQ-170
    - 18RXY – General
    - 18RXZ – Other
  - 18SX – Special operations remotely piloted aircraft pilot
    - 18SXA – MQ-1
    - 18SXB – MQ-9
    - 18SXU – Air liaison officer (ALO)
    - 18SXY – General
    - 18SXZ – Other
- 19 – Air Force special warfare
  - 19ZX – Special warfare
    - 19ZXA – Special tactics
    - 19ZXB – Tactical air control party
    - 19ZXC – Combat rescue

=== Logistics ===
- 20C0 – Logistics commander
- 21AX – Aircraft maintenance
- 21MX – Munitions and missile maintenance
  - 21MXA – Conventional
  - 21MXI – ICBM
  - 21MXN – Nuclear
- 21RX – Logistics readiness

=== Support ===
- 30C0 – Support commander
- 31PX – Security forces
- 32EX – Civil engineer
  - 32EXA – Architect/architectural engineer
  - 32EXB – Readiness & emergency management engineer
  - 32EXB – Civil engineer
  - 32EXE – Electrical engineer
  - 32EXF – Mechanical engineer
  - 32EXG – General engineer
  - 32EXH – Explosive ordnance disposal engineer
  - 32EXI – Industrial engineer
  - 32EXJ – Environmental engineer
- 35BX – Band
- 35PX – Public affairs

- 38FX – Force support
  - 38FXA – Analyst
  - 38FXQ – Section commander

=== Medical ===
- 40C0 – Medical commander

- 41XX – Health Services Utilization Field
  - 41AX – Health services administrator
    - 41AXA – Health facilities architect/engineer/construction manager
- 42XX – Biomedical Clinician Utilization Field
  - 42BX – Physical therapist
    - 42BXZ – Special warfare
  - 42EX – Optometrist
  - 42FX – Podiatric surgeon
  - 42GX – Physician assistant
    - 42GXA – Orthopedics
    - 42GXB – Otolaryngology
    - 42GXC – General surgery
    - 42GXE – Emergency medicine
    - 42GXN – Psychiatry
    - 42GXP – Aeromedical
  - 42NX – Audiologist
  - 42PX – Clinical psychologist
    - 42PXA – Clinical neuropsychologist
    - 42PXB – Clinical health psychologist
    - 42PXC – Child & adolescent psychologist
    - 42PXD – Aviation psychologist
    - 42PXE – Operational psychologist
    - 42PXF – Investigative psychologist
  - 42SX – Clinical social worker
  - 42TX – Occupational therapist
  - 43BX – Biomedical scientist
- 43XX – Biomedical Specialists Utilization Field
  - 43DX – Dietitian
  - 43EX – Bioenvironmental engineer
    - 43EXA – General
    - 43EXB – Industrial hygiene
    - 43EXD – Environmental engineering and science
    - 43EXG – Health physics
    - 43EXM – Medical physics
    - 43EXR – Radiation
  - 43HX – Public health officer
    - 43HXE – Medical entomologist
  - 43PX – Pharmacist
    - 43PXA – Clinical pharmacy
  - 43TX – Biomedical laboratory
    - 43TXA – Biomedical laboratory science
    - 43TXB – Microbiology
    - 43TXC – Clinical chemistry
    - 43TXD – Environmental and industrial hygiene chemistry
    - 43TXE – Blood bank
    - 43TXF – Toxicologist
    - 43TXH – Hematology
- 44XX – Physician Utilization Field
  - 44AX – Chief of medical staff
  - 44BX – Preventive medicine physician
  - 44DX – Pathologist
    - 44DXA – Hematology
    - 44DXB – Cytology
    - 44DXC – Gynecology
    - 44DXD – Forensic
    - 44DXE – Neuropathology
    - 44DXF – Pediatric
    - 44DXG – Transfusion medicine
    - 44DXK – Dermatology
  - 44EX – Emergency services physician
    - 44EXA – Emergency medicine specialist
    - 44EXE – Emergency medicine services physician
  - 44FX – Family physician
    - 44FXA – Sports medicine
    - 44FXB – Obstetrics
    - 44FXC – Pain management
  - 44GX – General practice physician
  - 44HX – Nuclear medicine physician
  - 44JX – Medical geneticist and genomicist
  - 44KX – Pediatrician
    - 44KXA – Adolescent medicine
    - 44KXB – Cardiology
    - 44KXC – Developmental pediatrics
    - 44KXD – Endocrinology
    - 44KXE – Neonatology
    - 44KXF – Gastroenterology
    - 44KXG – Hematology
    - 44KXH – Neurology
    - 44KXJ – Pulmonology
    - 44KXK – Infectious diseases
    - 44KXM – Nephrology
    - 44KXN – Child abuse
    - 44KXP – Sleep medicine
  - 44MX – Internal medicine physician
    - 44MXA – Hematology/oncology
    - 44MXB – Cardiology
    - 44MXC – Endocrinology
    - 44MXD – Gastroenterology
    - 44MXE – Hematology
    - 44MXF – Rheumatology
    - 44MXG – Pulmonary diseases
    - 44MXH – Infectious diseases
    - 44MXJ – Nephrology
    - 44MXK – Geriatrics/palliative care medicine
    - 44MXL – Sleep medicine
  - 44NX – Neurologist
    - 44NXA – Sleep medicine
    - 44NXB – Pain management
  - 44OX – Physician (reserved for positions requiring a physician without specific specialty training).
  - 44PX – Psychiatrist
    - 44PXA – Child psychiatry
    - 44PXB – Forensic psychiatry
    - 44PXC – Addictions psychiatry
    - 44PXD – Psychosomatic psychiatry
    - 44PXE – Neuropsychiatry
    - 44PXF – Sleep pathology
  - 44RX – Radiologist
    - 44RXA – Neuroradiology
    - 44RXB – Special procedures
    - 44RXC – Pediatric
    - 44RXD – Nuclear medicine
    - 44RXE – Musculoskeletal
    - 44RXF – Magnetic resonance imaging (MRI)
    - 44RXG – Body imaging
    - 44RXH – Cardiothoracic imaging
    - 44RXJ – Women's imaging
  - 44SX – Dermatologist
    - 44SXA – Dermatologic surgery
    - 44SXB – Dermatopathology
    - 44SXC – Pediatric dermatology
  - 44TX – Radiation oncologist
  - 44UX – Occupational medicine physician
  - 44YX – Critical care medicine physician
    - 44YXA – Anesthesia
    - 44YXE – Emergency medicine
    - 44YXK – Pediatrics
    - 44YXM – Internal medicine
    - 44YXN – Neurology
    - 44YXS – Surgery
  - 44ZX – Allergist and immunologist
- 45XX – Surgery Utilization Field
  - 45AX – Anesthesiologist
    - 45AXA – Cardiothoracic
    - 45AXB – Pain management
  - 45BX – Orthopedic surgeon
    - 45BXA – Hand surgery
    - 45BXA – Pediatrics
    - 45BXA – Sports medicine
    - 45BXA – Spine surgery
    - 45BXA – Oncology
    - 45BXA – Replacement arthroplasty
    - 45BXA – Traumatology
  - 45EX – Ophthalmologist
    - 45EXA – Oculoplastics
    - 45EXB – Comea/external disease
    - 45EXC – Glaucoma
    - 45EXD – Neuro-ophthalmology
    - 45EXE – Pathology
    - 45EXF – Strabismus/pediatrics
    - 45EXG – Vitreous/retina
  - 45GX – Gynecologic surgery and obstetrics
    - 45GXA – Endocrinology
    - 45GXB – Oncology
    - 45GXD – Maternal–fetal medicine
    - 45GXE – Urogynecology/pelvic reconstructive surgery
    - 45GXF – Minimally invasive gynecologic surgery (MIGS)
  - 45NX – Otolaryngologist – head and neck surgeon
    - 45NXA – Otology/neurotology
    - 45NXB – Head & neck surgical oncology
    - 45NXC – Pediatric otolaryngology
    - 45NXD – Facial plastic surgery
    - 45NXE – Rhinology & cranial base surgery
    - 45NXF – Laryngology
    - 45NXG – Sleep surgeon
  - 45PX – Physical medicine physician
  - 45SX – Surgeon
    - 45SXA – Thoracic
    - 45SXB – Colon and rectal
    - 45SXC – Cardiac
    - 45SXD – Pediatric
    - 45SXE – Peripheral vascular
    - 45SXF – Neurological
    - 45SXG – Plastic
    - 45SXH – Oncology
    - 45SXK – Trauma/critical care
  - 45UX – Urologist
    - 45UXA – Pediatrics
    - 45UXB – Oncology
    - 45UXD – Endourology/robotics
    - 45UXE – Female urology/reconstruction
- 46XX – Nurse Utilization Field
  - 46AX – Nurse administrator
  - 46FX – Flight nurse
  - 46NX – Clinical nurse
    - 46NXD – Staff development
    - 46NXE – Critical care
    - 46NXF – Neonatal intensive care
    - 46NXG – Obstetrical
    - 46NXJ – Emergency/trauma
    - 46NXR – Post-anesthesia care unit
  - 46PX – Mental health nurse
  - 46SX – Operating room nurse
  - 46YX – Advanced practice registered nurse (APRN)
    - 46YXA – Women's health care nurse practitioner
    - 46YXB – Pediatric nurse practitioner
    - 46YXC – Acute care nurse practitioner
    - 46YXF – Aeromedical nurse practitioner
    - 46YXG – Certified nurse midwife
    - 46YXH – Family nurse practitioner
    - 46YXM – Certified registered nurse anesthetist
    - 46YXP – Adult psychiatric & mental health nurse practitioner
- 47XX – Dental Utilization Field
  - 47BX – Orthodontist
  - 47DX – Oral and maxillofacial pathologist
  - 47EX – Endodontist
  - 47GX – Dentist
    - 47GXA – Comprehensive
    - 47GXB – Advanced clinical
    - 47GXC – General clinical
    - 47GXD – Public health
    - 47GXE – Dental materials science
    - 47GXF – Oral and maxillofacial radiology
    - 47GXG – Temporomandibular disorders
    - 47GXH – Hospital dentistry
  - 47HX – Periodontist
  - 47KX – Pediatric dentist
  - 47PX – Prosthodontist
    - 47PXA – Maxillofacial prosthetics
    - 47PXB – Area dental laboratory
    - 47PXC – Dental materials
  - 47SX – Oral and maxillofacial surgeon
    - 47SXA – Temporomandibular joint
    - 47SXB – Facial esthetics
    - 47SXC – Maxillofacial reconstruction
- 48XX – Aerospace Medicine Utilization Field
  - 48AX – Aerospace medicine physician specialist
    - 48AXX – Space medical operations experienced
  - 48GX – General medical officer (GMO), flight surgeon
    - 48GXX – Space medical operations experienced
  - 48OX – Aeromedical physician
  - 48RX – Residency trained flight surgeon
    - 48RXE – Board eligible in emergency medicine
    - 48RXF – Board eligible in family medicine
    - 48RXK – Board eligible in pediatric medicine
    - 48RXM – Board eligible in internal medicine
    - 48RXX – Space medical operations experienced
  - 48VX – Pilot-physician

=== Professional ===

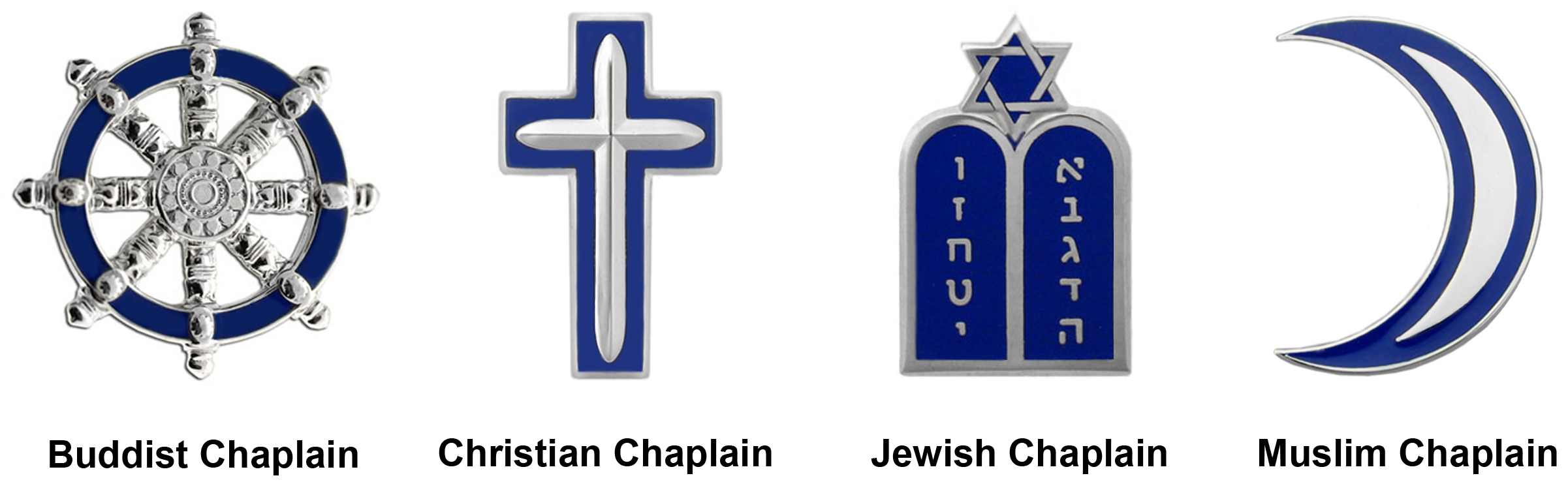

- 51JX – Judge advocate
- 52RX – Chaplain

=== Acquisition ===
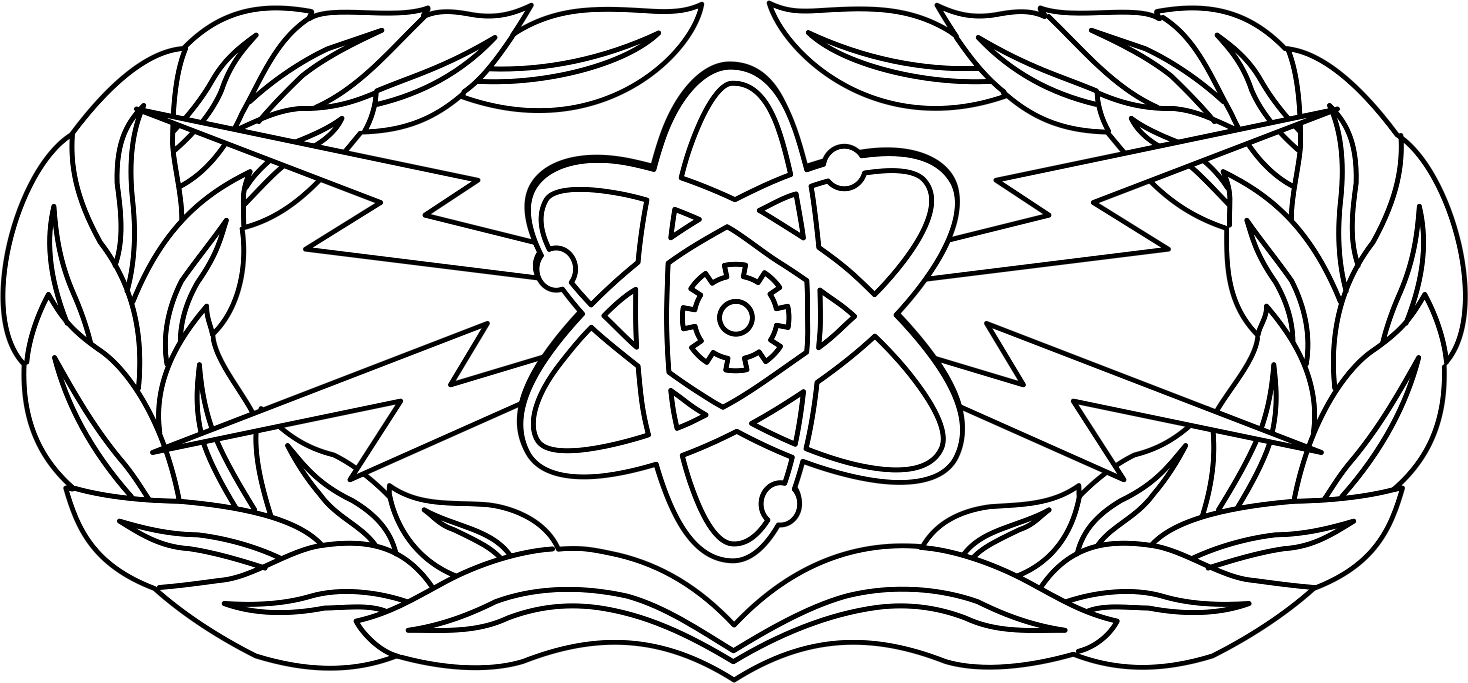

- 60C0 – Senior material leader – upper echelon
- 61CX – Chemist/nuclear chemist
  - 61CXN – Nuclear
- 61DX – Physicist/nuclear engineer
  - 61DXN – Nuclear
- 62EX – Developmental engineer
  - 62EXA – Aeronautical
  - 62EXB – Astronautical
  - 62EXC – Computer systems
  - 62EXE – Electrical/electronic
  - 62EXF – Flight test
  - 62EXG – Project
  - 62EXH – Mechanical
  - 62EXI – Systems/industrial/human factors
- 62S0 – Materiel leader
- 63AX – Acquisition manager
- 63G0 – Senior materiel leader – lower echelon
- 63S0 – Materiel leader
- 64PX – Contracting
- 65FX – Financial management
- 65WX – Cost analysis

=== Special investigations ===
- 71SX – Special investigator

=== Special duty identifiers ===
- 80C0 – Commander, cadet squadron, USAF academy
- 81C0 – Instructor, officer training school
- 81D0 – Air Force reserve officer training corps detachment commander and professor of aerospace studies
- 81L0 – Education and training leader
- 81T0 – Instructor
- 82A0 – Academic program manager
- 83R0 – Recruiting service
- 84H0 – Historian
- 85G0 – USAF Honor Guard
- 86M0 – Operations management
- 86P0 – Command and control
- 87G0 – Wing inspector general
- 87I0 – Director, wing inspections
- 87Q0 – Director, complaints resolution
- 88A0 – Aide-de-camp
- 88B0 – Protocol officer
- 88C0 – Sexual assault response coordinator
- 88I0 – Innovation officer
- 88M0 – United States Air Force medical pinnacle position
- 88Y0 – Pathfinder officer
- 89A0 – Air advisor (basic)
- 89B0 – Air advisor (basic) team leader
- 89C0 – Air advisor (basic) mission commander
- 89D0 – Air advisor (advanced)
- 89E0 – Air advisor (advanced) team leader
- 89F0 – Air advisor (advanced) mission commander
- 89G0 – Combat aviation advisor
- 89H0 – Combat aviation advisor team leader
- 89I0 – Combat aviation advisor mission commander
- 89W0 – Weapons of mass destruction civil support team (WMD-CST)

=== Reporting identifiers ===
- 90G0 – General officer
- 91C0 – Commander
- 91E0 – Wing commander equivalent
- 91W0 – Wing commander
- 92F0 – Foreign area officer (FAO) trainee
- 92J0 – Non-designated lawyer
- 92J1 – AFROTC educational delay law student
- 92J2 – Funded legal education program law student
- 92J3 – Excess leave law student
- 92M0 – Health Professions Scholarship Program (HPSP) medical student
- 92M1 – Uniformed Services University of Health Sciences (USUHS) student
- 92M2 – HPSP biomedical science student
- 92P0 – Physician assistant student
- 92R0 – Chaplain candidate
- 92S0 – Student officer authorization
- 92T0 – Pilot trainee
- 92T1 – Combat systems officer trainee
- 92T2 – Air battle manager trainee
- 92T3 – Remotely piloted aircraft pilot trainee
- 92W0 – Combat wounded warrior
- 92W1 – Reserved for future use
- 92W2 – Combat wounded warrior with exemptions
- 92W3 – Non-combat wounded warrior
- 92W4 – Wounded warrior – limited assignment status (LAS)
- 92W5 – Wounded warrior – retired/discharged
- 92W6 – Reserved for future use
- 92W7 – Reserved for future use
- 92W8 – Wounded warrior – ambassador
- 92W9 – Wounded warrior – project planner/officer
- 93P0 – Patient
- 94N0 – Nuclear weapons custodian
- 95A0 – Non-EAD USAFR academy liaison officer (ALO) or civil air patrol reserve assistance program (CAPRAP) officer
- 96A0 – Disqualified officer, reasons beyond their control
- 96B0 – Disqualified officer, reasons within their control
- 96D0 – Officer not available in awarded AFSC for cause
- 96U0 – Unclassified officer
- 96V0 – Un-allotted
- 97E0 – Executive officer
- 99A0 – Unspecified AFSC
- 99G0 – Gold bar diversity recruiter

== Additional information ==
During the course of their Air Force careers, Airmen sometimes switch jobs and receive multiple AFSCs to denote training in multiple specialties. A Primary AFSC (PAFSC) is the designation for the specialty in which the individual possesses the highest skill level and is, therefore, the AFSC that he or she is best qualified to perform. The Duty AFSC (DAFSC) reflects the actual manpower position the Airman is assigned to. The Control AFSC (CAFSC) is a management tool to make assignments, assist in determining training requirements, and consider individuals for promotion. Often an enlisted Airman's PAFSC will reflect a higher skill level than his or her CAFSC since the CAFSC skill level is tied to rank while the PAFSC skill level is tied to performance and education.

Usually, the PAFSC, DAFSC, and CAFSC will be the same. However, situations such as retraining, special duties, or Air Force-level changes necessitate these distinctions. Additionally, Airmen that have retrained into multiple specialties will have several Secondary AFSCs (2AFSC, 3AFSC, etc.). Air Force officers are limited to 3 AFSCs in MilPDS while Enlisted may have 4 AFSCs on record.

Special Experience Identifiers (SEIs) are established to identify special experience and training. The Air Force Enlisted Classification Directory (AFECD) and Air Force Officer Classification Directory (AFOCD) Section III contains the complete list of authorized SEIs and includes designation criteria and authorized AFSC combinations. (AFMAN 36–2100)

Enlisted personnel may wear the master badge as a Master Sergeant or above with 5 years in the specialty from award of the 7-skill level. Officers wear the master badge after 15 years in the specialty.

== See also ==
- Badges of the United States Air Force
- List of United States Army careers
- List of United States Marine Corps MOS
- List of United States Naval officer designators
- List of United States Navy ratings
- List of United States Navy staff corps
- List of United States Coast Guard ratings
- Military education and training
