= Combat Arms Training and Maintenance =

Combat Arms Training and Maintenance (CATM), or simply Combat Arms, are United States Air Force Security Forces personnel who train base populace on the use of small arms, oversee, maintain and repair all small arms in the U.S. Air Force inventory. AFSC 3P0X1B, SEI 312 (TSgt and above) are Security Forces personnel who completed the 10 week Combat Arms Apprentice Course (Lackland AFB) and conduct marksmanship training to prepare all Air Force personnel for home station and deployment operations. Combat Arms specialists lead, manage, supervise and implement small arms weapons training programs. Their duties include operating firing ranges and associated facilities, enforcing range safety, inspecting/repairing weaponry, performing preventative maintenance, developing/utilizing training aides and determining training/maintenance resource requirements. Combat Arms personnel also provide training in safeguarding weapons, ammunition and equipment; instructing small arms weapons qualification training and providing guidance on weapons placement to SF and other ground defense force commanders. Combat Arms Instructors are the Air Forces small arms weapons Subject Matter Experts (SME).

== History ==
The internal defense of USAF bases and the survival of downed aircrew members may be dependent upon individual proficiency with assigned firearms. All Air Force personnel have defense responsibilities against overt and covert enemy action. To discharge these responsibilities, the fundamental military concept of competency with firearms must be reinstated within the Air Force.

— General Curtis E. LeMay

During the Korean War, several incidents occurred which called attention to the small arms training provided to Air Force personnel. The most significant was the tragedy at Kimpo Air Base, Korea, which was overrun by a numerically superior Chinese communist force. The Air Police Squadron was so overwhelmed that they were forced to fight a rear guard action before being annihilated. The general base population was then easily defeated before reinforcements arrived to drive the enemy back. The remaining personnel found alive by the Chinese were hanged in the main hangar on Kimpo. This hangar still stands today as a memorial to those who died without a chance to fight.

The resulting investigation revealed serious deficiencies in the way small arms training was perceived and carried out in the Air Force. Prior to the Korean War, no formal program of weapons training existed. One result was the inability of the majority of personnel at Kimpo to successfully defend themselves and the base. The majority of the base weapons were inoperable due to lack of maintenance. The few serviceable ones were of little use as personnel were not trained in their use, unable to even load or aim them. Only the Air Police were routinely trained in marksmanship and maintenance of small arms.

Please note not everyone agrees the "Kimpo Massacre" occurred. The US Air Force Police Alumni Association website addresses this claim on their website. http://www.usafpolice.org/korea.html

The experience of the Korean War encouraged General LeMay, then Vice Chief of Staff and former Strategic Air Command commander, to pursue a course that was to change the way weapons training was received by Air Force personnel. In 1958, twenty-five experienced USAF competitive shooters were selected to become the initial instructor cadre of the USAF Marksmanship Center located at Lackland Air Force Base, Texas. The marksmanship program was designed by Colonel Tom Kelly, former Commander of Holloman Air Force Base, New Mexico, and under the direction of Colonel Peter W. Agnell. The initial cadre attended the U.S. Army's advanced rifle marksmanship coaches class at Fort Benning, Georgia from 26 January to 15 February 1958. The three-week training course included coaching techniques, range management, and procedures for the preparation of marksmanship training programs. The purpose of the initial cadre was to train Small Arms instructors and gunsmiths for assignment to all Air Force bases. With these personnel as a core for the newly formed USAF Marksmanship Center, bases throughout the world began selecting personnel to be sent to the center for training. On 5 November 1958, the first class was conducted consisting of 32 students. The initial course was 12 weeks in duration and graduated qualified Small Arms instructors who returned to their bases to establish local Marksmanship Programs. The new instructors were awarded the Air Force Specialty Code (AFSC) 753X0 and the expanded program included intensive training for aircrews, Air Police, Air Base Defense personnel to improve the overall weapons capability of all Air Force personnel.

In 1965, the USAF Marksmanship unit's name was formally changed to Small Arms Marksmanship Training Unit (SAMTU). This change designated what weapons the career field was responsible to train. Besides meeting local training objectives and conducting competitive rifle and pistol matches, Small Arms specialists set up and operated specialty courses. The USAF Sniper School, located at Fort Campbell, Kentucky, was one of these and existed from 1965 to 1967. Its purpose was to train personnel to carry out their assigned duties effectively in the Republic of Vietnam. There was also a 72-hour Southeast Asia (SEA) course in operation through 1971. Its purpose was to prepare all Air Force personnel en route to Southeast Asia. [NOTE: Some Air Force Snipers, who were assigned to the Air Commando units and were not instructors, were sent to the Marine Sniper School during 1965-1968.]

Control of the marksmanship program moved from Washington D.C. to Randolph Air Force Base, Texas, in 1978. This move was to enhance the program management. The career field again felt another change in 1982 when it was functionally restructured to report to the Air Force Office of Security Police. With this change came the re designation to "Combat Arms Training and Maintenance" (CATM).

On November 1, 1993, the AFSC was changed to more closely align the career field with the Security Police career field. The new designation was 3P1X1 for CATM instructors and 3P1X1A for gunsmiths. The career field also shared the same functional badge with Security Police and the Office of Special Investigations (OSI), which designated the basic level, the 7-level, and Senior NCO Academy graduate level. Since then the career field again changed and Combat Arms instructors were merged with Security Forces in 1997, with the first graduating "Security Forces" Class on 10 April 1997, becoming Security Forces first and Combat Arms as a "shred-out" of the AFSC. The new inclusive Security Apprentice course )L3ABR3P031-000) became the norm with training at Lackland AFB, San Antonio, Texas. CATM instructors now have the AFSC of 3P0X1B through the rank of SSgt and are designed SEI 312 as TSgt and above.

== The Combat Arms Instructor's Creed ==
Since the introduction of the Airmans Creed in 2007 by General T. Michael Mosele, all other creeds are officially unrecognized by the Air Force. This also includes the Security Forces Creed.

I am an Air Force Combat Arms Instructor.

My country's strength lies in the men and women I train and their weapons which I maintain.
My students hold faith and place great trust in me. Their lives depend on my ability and their confidence in my integrity for in a time of war their talent will be needed.
They are to be treated with fairness and discretion for my country's resources are entrusted to their watchful eye, and their survival is in my hands.
My students I MUST NOT FAIL, My students I WILL NOT FAIL. For mine is a proud heritage and fostering it is my responsibility.
I am an Air Force Combat Arms Instructor "ours is the profession of arms"

We train in peace, to prepare for war.
