= Blue Dress =

Blue Dress or blue dress may refer to:

== Clothing ==
- Blue Dress uniform of the United States Marine Corps
- Army Service Uniform, blue military uniform worn by United States Army personnel
- Blue dress worn by Monica Lewinsky during the Clinton–Lewinsky scandal
- Engagement announcement dress of Catherine Middleton, worn in 2010
- Navy blue Guy Laroche dress of Hilary Swank, worn to the Academy Awards in 2005
- The dress, a 2015 viral internet sensation
- Alice in Wonderland dress, commonly depicted in blue

== Songs ==
- "Blue Dress", 1963 song by The Murmaids on the B-side of "Popsicles and Icicles"
- "Blue Dress", 1990 song by Depeche Mode on Violator
- "Blue Dress", 2003 song by The Number Twelve Looks Like You on Put on Your Rosy Red Glasses
- "Vestido Azul" (lit. '"Blue Dress"'), 2003 song by La Oreja de Van Gogh on Lo Que te Conté Mientras te Hacías la Dormida
- "Blue Dress", 2006 recording by Mike Doughty on The Lo-Fi Lodge
- "Blue Dress", 2010 song by Walk the Moon on I Want! I Want!
- "Blue Dress", 2010 song by Chomet from The Illusionist: Music from the Motion Picture
- "The Blue Dress", 2012 song by Wild Nothing on Nocturne
- "Sineye Plat'e" (Russian: "Синее платье"; lit. '"Blue Dress"'), 2013 song by NikitA
- "Blue Dress", 2018 song by Gillian Hills
- "Blue Dress", 2019 song by Benjamin Francis Leftwich on Gratitude

== Literature ==
- The Blue Dress, 1991 young adult novel by Libby Hathorn
- The Blue Dress, 2003 poetry collection by Alison Townsend
- La Robe bleue (lit. 'The Blue Dress'), 2004 novel by Michèle Desbordes
- The Blue Dress, short story by Lynda Myles

== Art ==
- The Blue Dress, 1911 painting by Walter Westley Russell
- Blue Dress, 1990 sculpture by Karen LaMonte
- "The Man Who Sang and The Woman Who Kept Silent" (colloquially known as "The Blue Dress"), 1998 artwork by Judith Mason

== Other ==
- "Blue Dress", 1985 G&L guitar used by Jerry Cantrell
- "The Blue Dress", 2006 episode of Young American Bodies
- Blue Dress Park, urban space in Milwaukee, Wisconsin
