= Near Here =

Work of public art by Paul Druecke

Coordinates: 43°03′29.9″N 87°53′08.8″W

- Artist: Paul Druecke
- Year: 2011
- Type: bronze
- Location: Institute of Visual Arts; Milwaukee, Wisconsin

Near Here is a public art work by American artist Paul Druecke, originally located on the facade of the Peck School of the Arts Kenilworth Building, part of University of Wisconsin–Milwaukee on the east side of Milwaukee, Wisconsin. The artwork is a bronze plaque with a poetic text created by Donna Stonecipher. It was located at 2155 North Prospect Avenue. The temporary installation has been relocated to The Green Gallery at 1500 N Farwell Ave, Milwaukee.
