= Urban Rangers =

Urban Rangers may refer to:

- A fictional scouting group on the show Ed, Edd n Eddy
- Los Angeles Urban Rangers
- Urban Rangers (film), a 1995 Philippine film directed by Jose Balagtas
