= Stonecipher =

Stonecipher is a surname, also appearing as Stonecypher. Notable people with the surname include:

- Donna Stonecipher (fl. since 1992), American poet
- Harry Stonecipher (born 1936), American chief executive

== See also ==
- Stonesifer
