= Blue Dress Park =

Artwork by Paul Druecke

Coordinates: 43°3′19.76″N 87°54′19.93″W

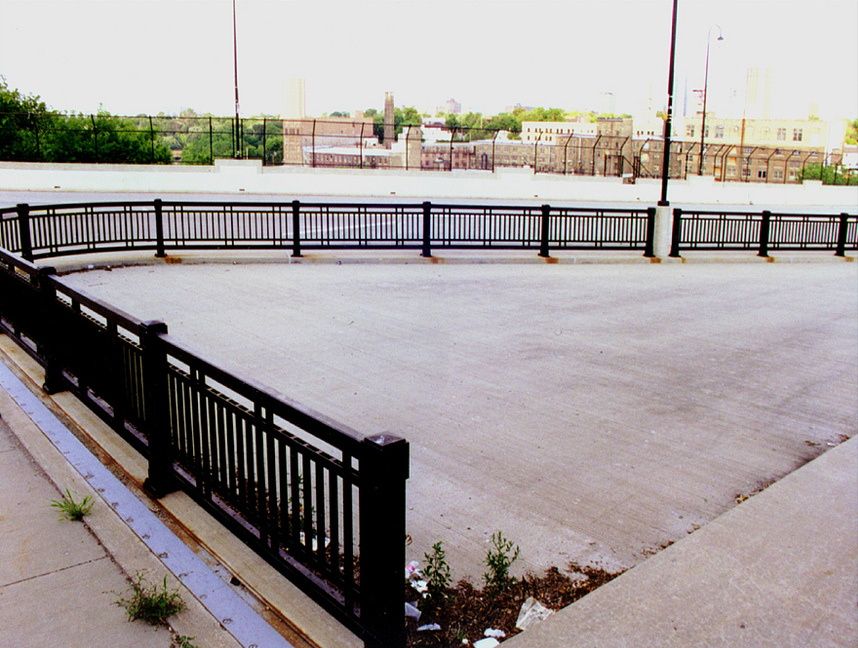
- Artist: Paul Druecke
- Year: 2000
- Type: site-specific intervention
- Location: Milwaukee, Wisconsin

Blue Dress Park is the name given to a derelict piece of urban space in the city of Milwaukee, Wisconsin, by conceptual artist Paul Druecke in 2000. The site is located on the northwest edge of the Holton Street Bridge, where it connects the Milwaukee East Side neighborhoods of Brewer's Hill, Riverwest, and Brady Street, and is a large concrete expanse surrounded by a low iron fence. In the summer of 2000, Druecke staged a "christening celebration" with champagne and chamber music on the site, temporarily transforming it into a "crowded meeting place".

In 2010, Druecke formed a collaborative effort with Los Angeles–based artist Sara Daleiden, a founding member of the LA Urban Rangers, to create the Friends of Blue Dress Park. Board members include Anna-Marie Opgenorth, Brian Reilly, John Riepenhoff, Wendy Slocum, Karin Wolf, and Steve Wetzel. Druecke serves as Creative Liaison for the informal organization. The Friends of Blue Dress Park held "Condiments Provided," a community gathering and brat tasting event on May 21, 2011.
