= Uniforms of the United States Army =

The uniforms of the United States Army distinguish soldiers from other service members. The two primary uniforms of the U.S. Army are the Army Combat Uniform, used in operational environments, and the Army Green Service Uniform, worn during everyday professional wear and during formal and ceremonial occasions that do not warrant the wear of the more formal blue service uniform.

== History ==
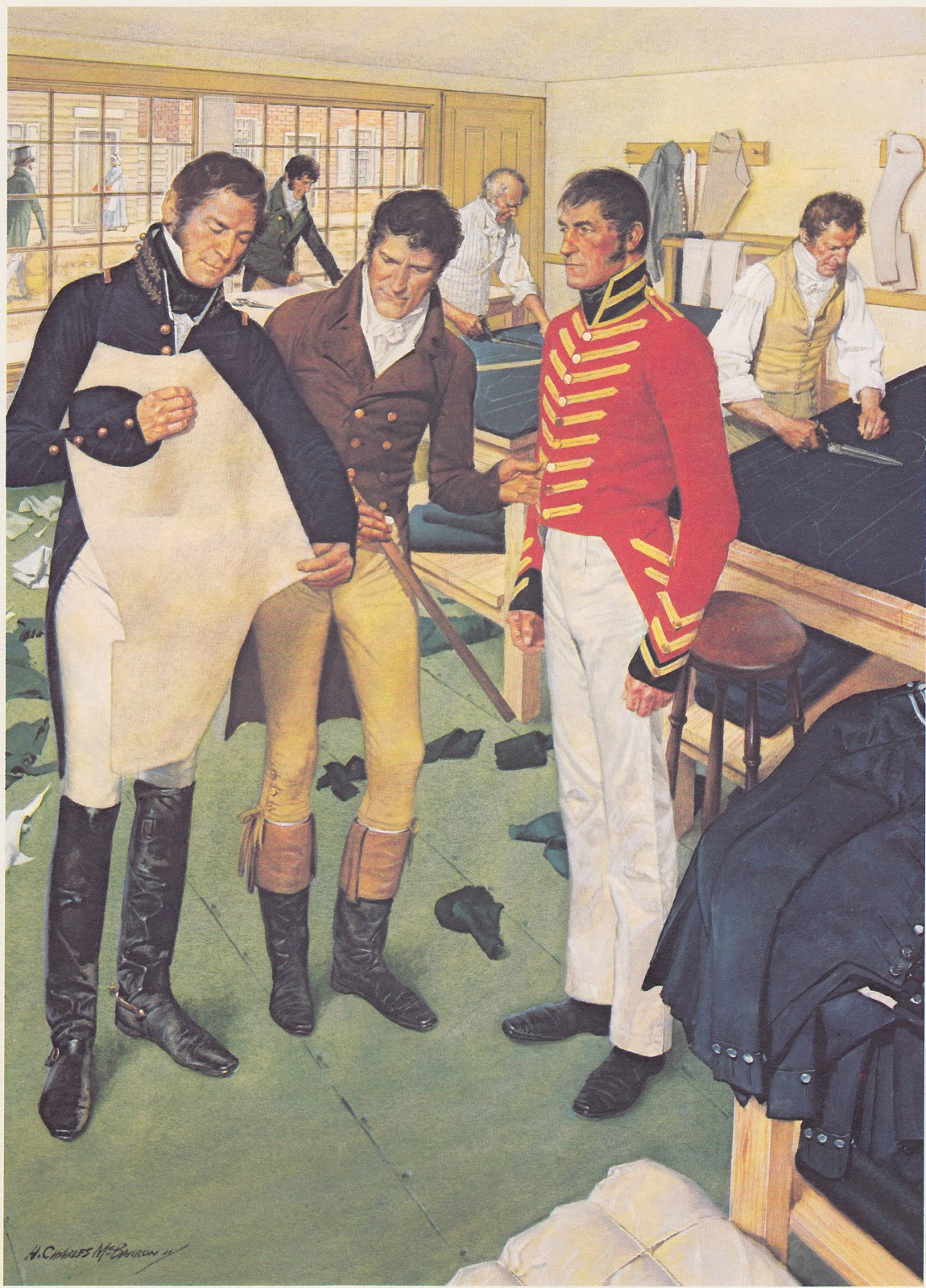
Uniforms for the War of 1812 were made in Philadelphia.

The design of early army uniforms was influenced by both British and French traditions. One of the first Army-wide regulations, adopted in 1789, prescribed blue coats with colored facings to identify a unit's region of origin: New England units wore white facings, southern units wore blue facings, and units from Mid-Atlantic states wore red facings. Bandsmen wore red uniforms to make them more easily identifiable to commanders on the field of battle. Pantaloons were originally white, following British uniforms, but were changed to gray in 1821 and sky blue in 1832. Infantry wore tricorne hats, with different cover prescribed for cavalry and specialist troops depending on function.

The original Revolutionary War enlisted uniform jacket was dark blue with state-specific facing colors. This was worn with a white waistcoat and breeches and black shoes. All ranks wore a black tricorne hat with a black cockade; later a white cockade was inset to represent the American alliance with Bourbon France. From 1782, Regulars had red facings. Foot regiments (infantry, artillery, and supporting units) wore gold-metal buttons and lace. Horse regiments (cavalry, light dragoons, and horse artillery) wore white-metal buttons and lace.

From 1810, the uniform changed to follow European trends. The tight-fitting and short-skirted double-breasted coatee replaced the single-breasted coat, and the waistcoat was discontinued. Militia wore gray coatees, still worn as a ceremonial uniform at West Point today. Regulars wore national blue (dark-blue) coatees, except for musicians, who wore reversed red coatees with blue facings. Enlisted ranks wore the coatee with a black stovepipe shako, white or gray trousers with matching button-up spats, and black short boots.

Facings and buttonhole trim were discontinued in 1813. From the early days of the Continental Army, the wearing of a sword and a worsted crimson sash served as a badge of rank for all sergeant grades. By 1820, the worsted sash became a privilege of first sergeants and above only. From 1781, until 1833, the "first sergeant" was simply the senior sergeant in a company or battery and was not a separate grade of rank.

Beginning in the 1850s, U.S. military began to place an increased emphasis on French army tactics and styles, influenced, in part, by the rise of Napoleon III. The most extreme adoption of French military fashion was in the use of zouave uniforms by some U.S. Army infantry regiments, and the purchase of 10,000 chasseurs à pied uniforms to outfit the Excelsior Brigade. More subtle French styling – including frock coats, kepi hats, and collar ornaments – were more common for uniforms of the Union Army during and after the American Civil War.

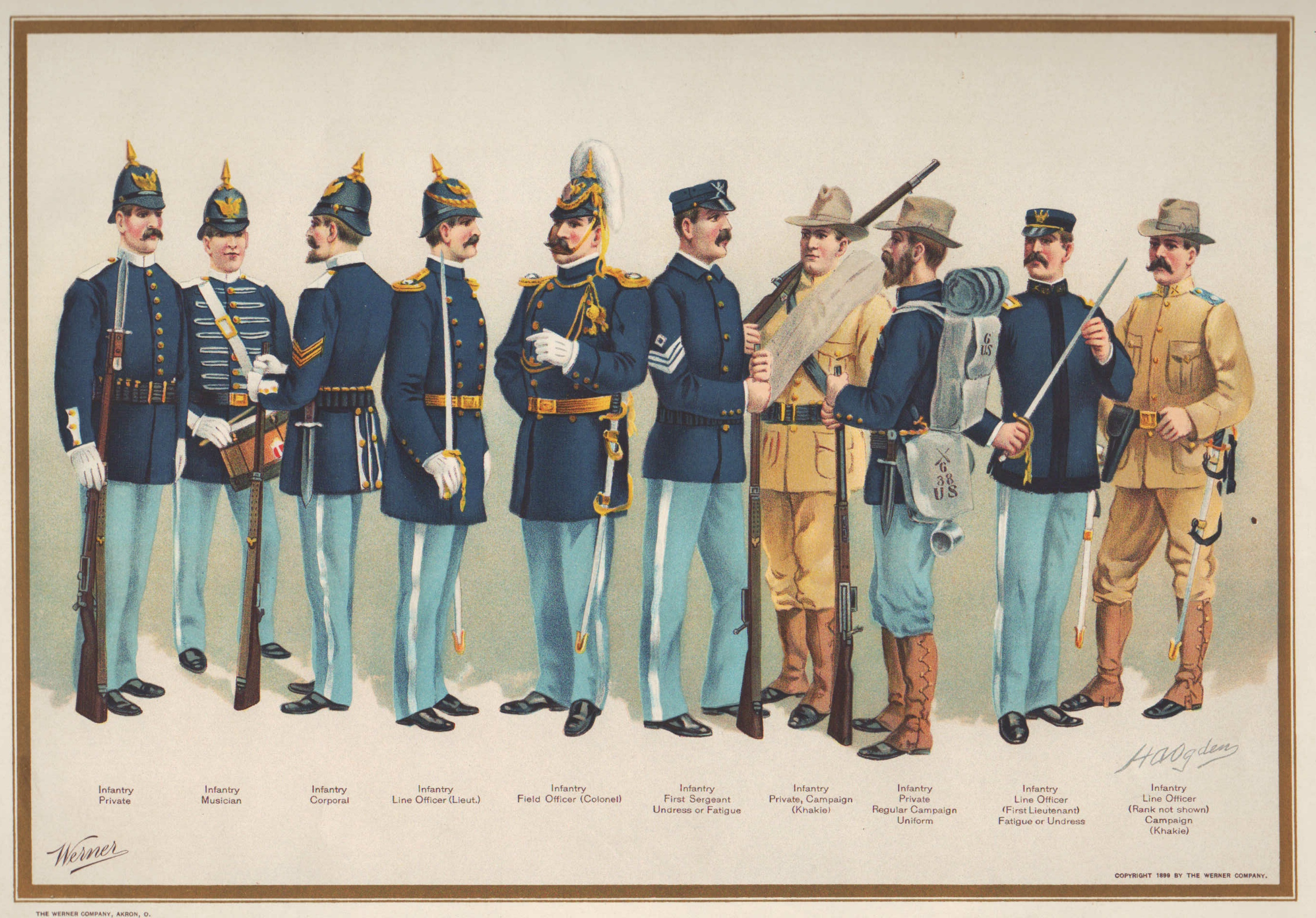
Infantry uniforms in 1899

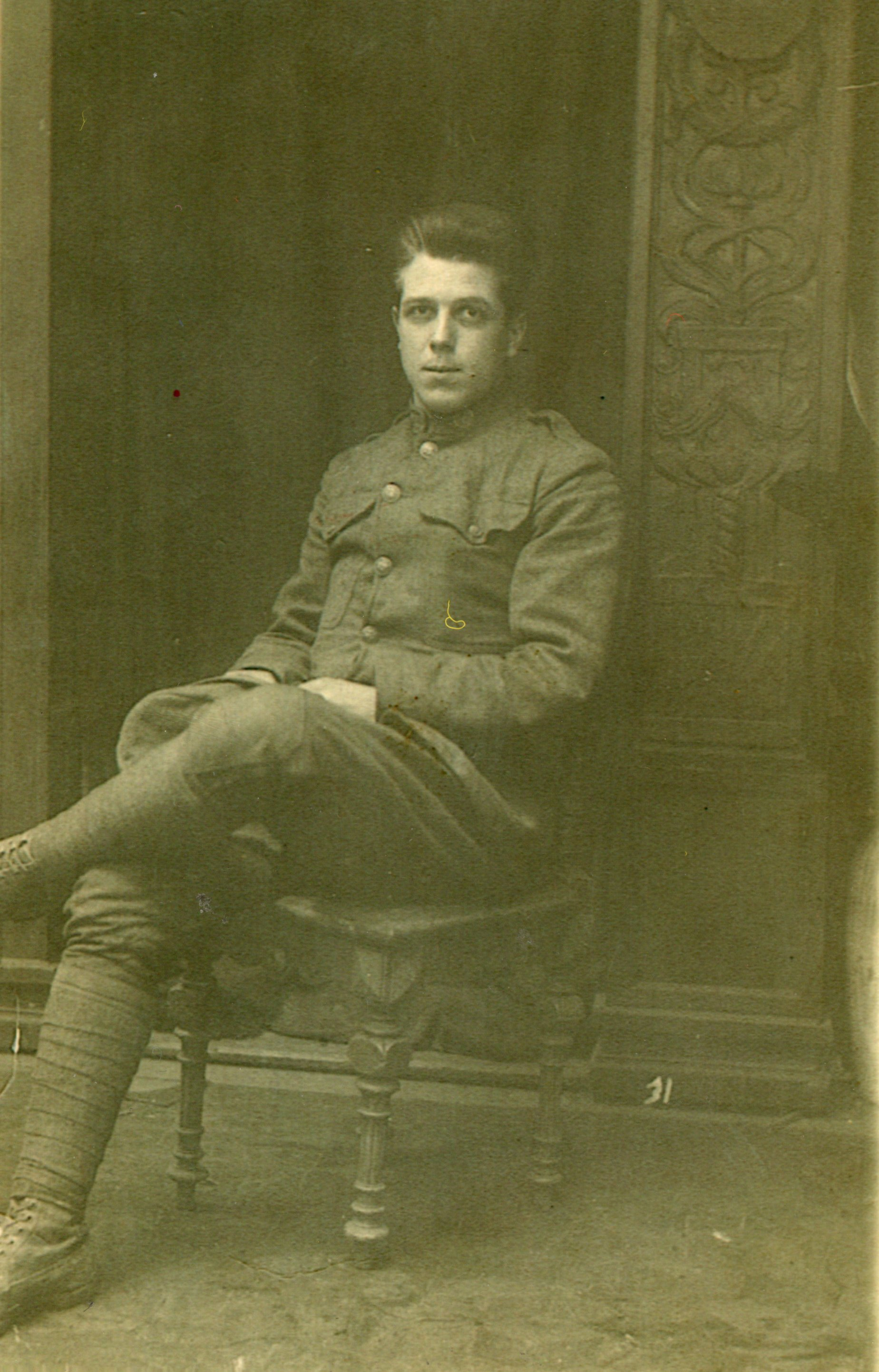
World War I soldier in his army uniform (1920)

Beginning in 1902, the Army made khaki and olive drab field uniforms standard issue, having seen their effectiveness in limited use during the Spanish–American War. The traditional blue was reserved for dress uniforms. Uniforms used during World War I remained substantially similar to the 1902 patterns. Blue uniforms were suspended during the conflict. During the inter-war period, piecemeal modifications were made to the designs, such as the introduction of open-collar coats, straight-legged trousers, and collared shirts with ties, resulting in uniforms that by the end of the 1930s were entirely different. A blue dress uniform was reintroduced in 1937.

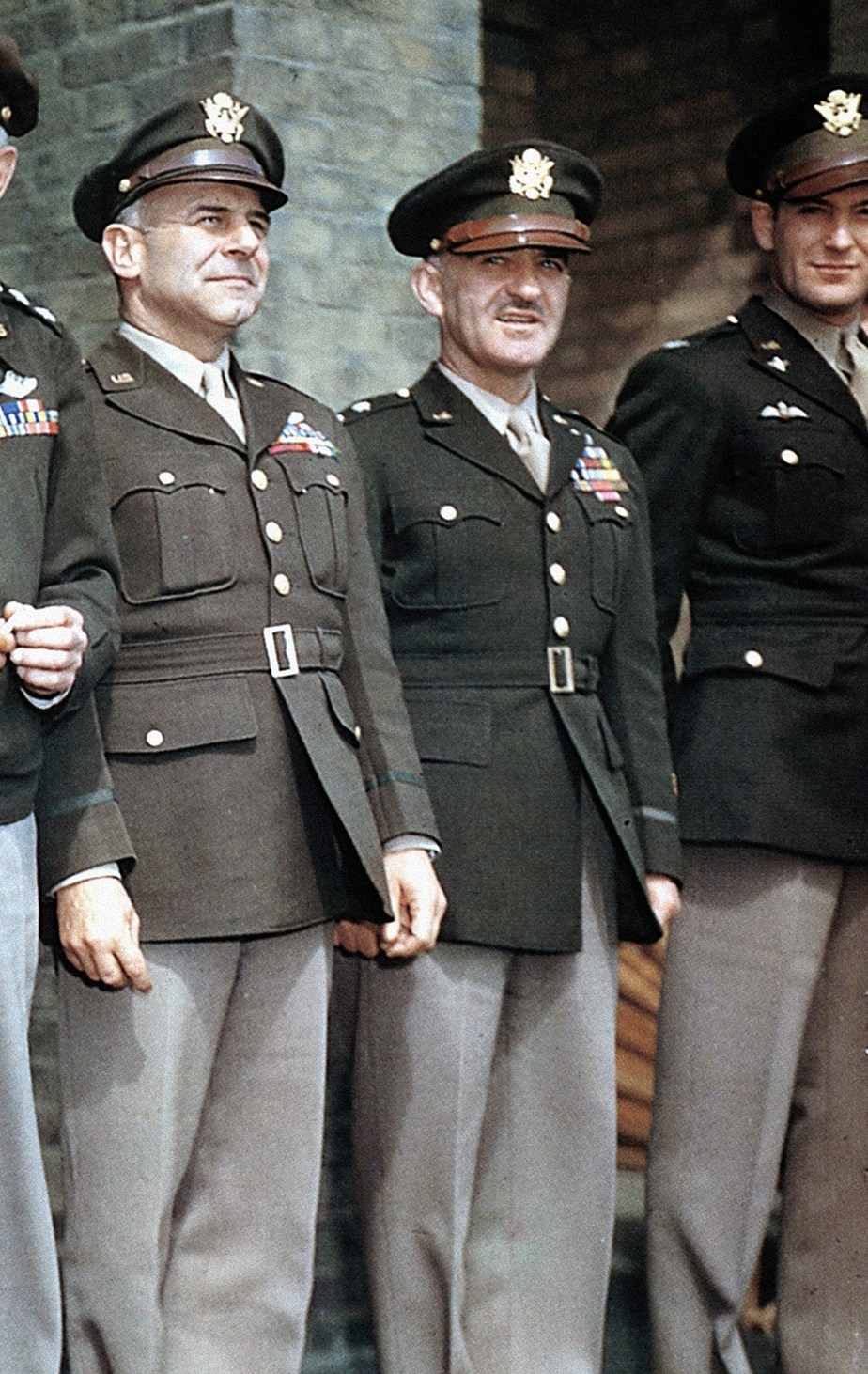
U.S. Army Air Forces officers wearing the "pinks and greens" uniform used during World War II

The U.S. Army uniforms used during World War II saw a divergence between field and garrison service elements. The latter necessitated by the suspension of the blue dress uniform again, leading to them becoming separate classes of uniforms by the end of the war. These uniforms continued in use into the Korean War.

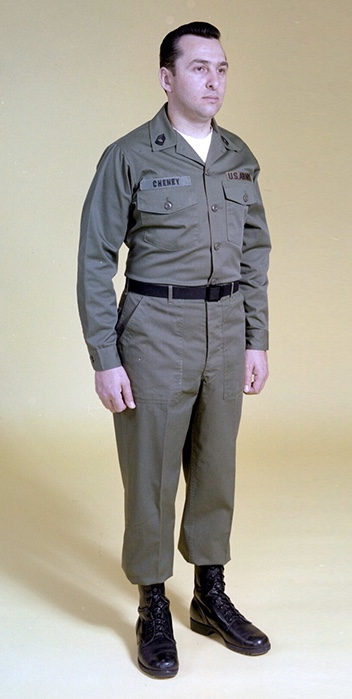
The OG-107 field uniform was used for nearly thirty years.

The OG-107 combat uniform was introduced as the new standard field uniform during the Korean War, and continued as the standard fatigue duty uniform for almost three decades. It saw minor changes through its lifespan.

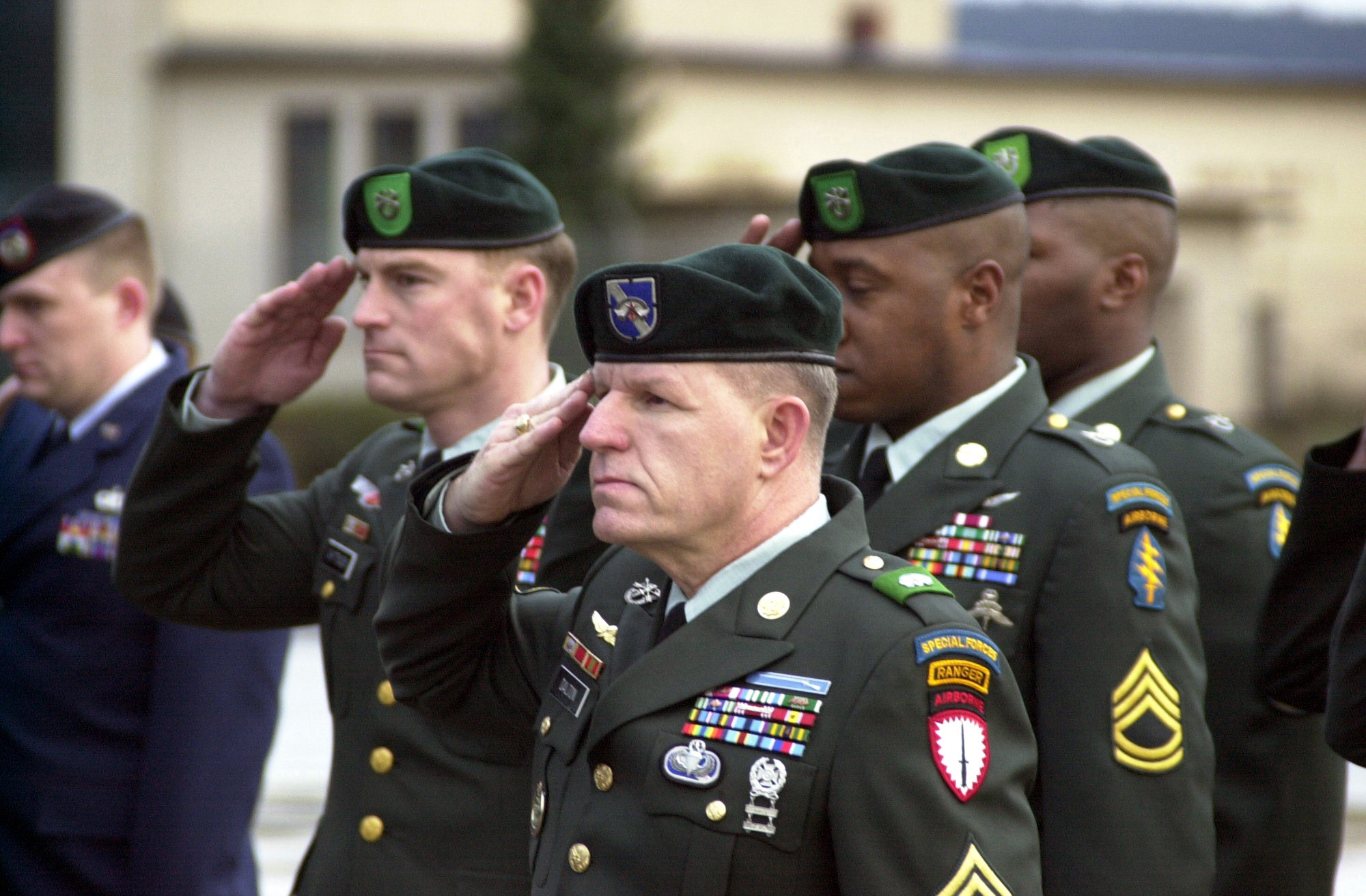
Army green Class "A" service uniforms, introduced in 1954 and retired in 2015

In 1954, the Army Green Uniform, also called the "Class A" uniform, was introduced for garrison dress. An alternate semi-dress uniform for the summer months, the Army Tan Uniform, continued in use until 1985, though was relegated to Class B status following the mid 1960s. The blue dress uniform, now mandatory for officers and an authorized option for enlisted soldiers, was reinstated in 1957.

The OG-107 field uniform was replaced in 1981 by the Battle Dress Uniform and Desert Battle Dress Uniform, later the Desert Camouflage Uniform, which saw use during the Gulf War. These were replaced by the Army Combat Uniform (ACU) in the mid-2000s, during the War in Afghanistan and War in Iraq. When initially introduced, the ACU used the Universal Camouflage Pattern. This proved to be an ineffective pattern and was replaced beginning in 2014 with the more effective Operational Camouflage Pattern. As of 2021, the ACU in OCP is the standard issue field uniform of the Army.

Beginning in 2010, the blue Army Service Uniform (ASU), previously used as a formal dress uniform, displaced the green Class A uniform as the daily wear service uniform. This move proved unpopular, and in 2018 a new Army Green Service Uniform (AGSU) modeled after World War II-era officers garrison uniforms was announced. By October 1, 2027, all soldiers will be required to wear the AGSU as office attire. The blue uniform will remain the ceremonial and formal dress uniform.

== Current designs ==
=== Standard uniforms ===
==== Army Combat Uniform ====
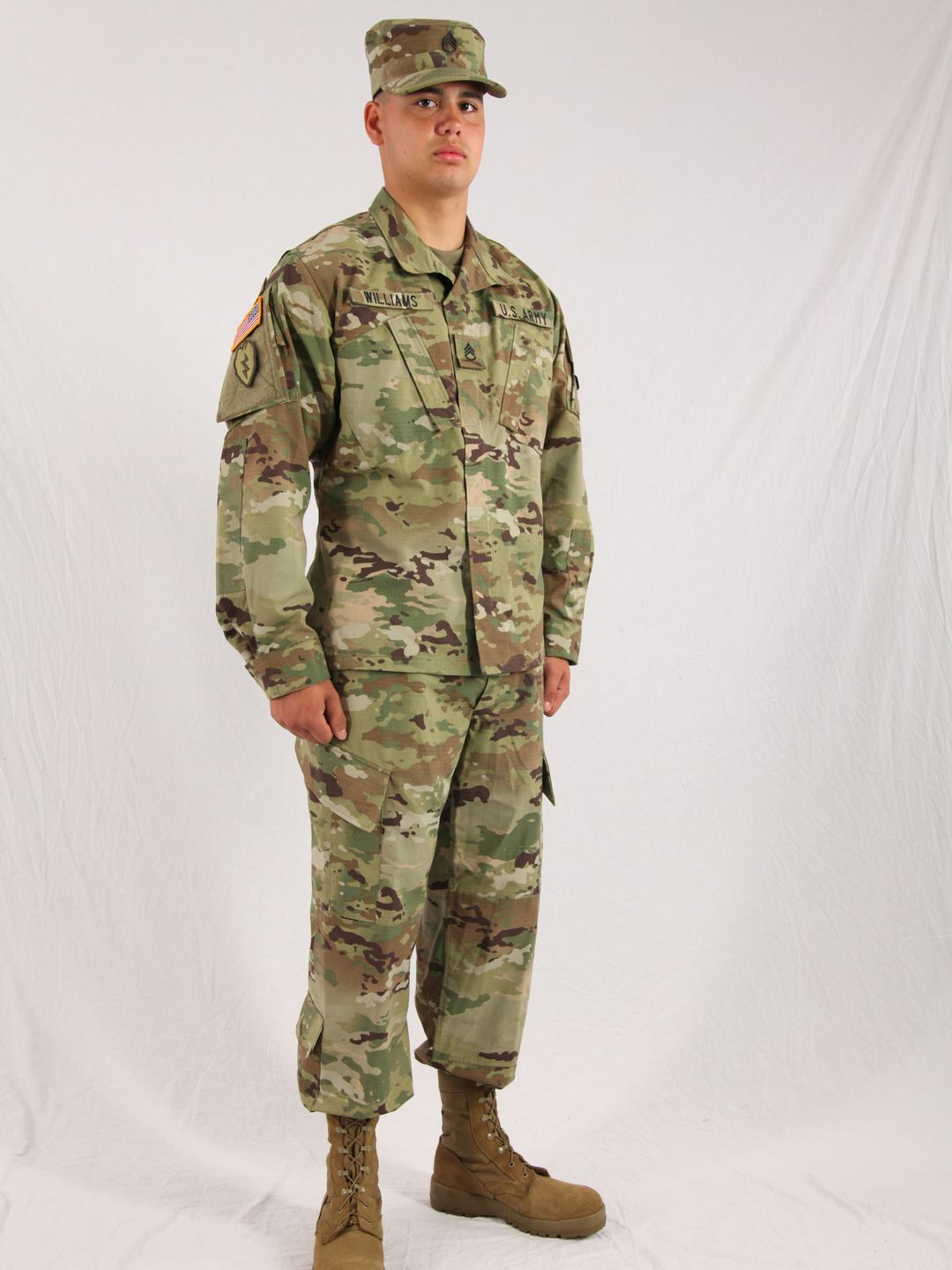
A soldier wearing the Army Combat Uniform

The Army Combat Uniform (ACU) is the utility uniform worn in garrison and in combat zones by the U.S. Army. It consists of a jacket and trousers in the Operational Camouflage Pattern (OCP), worn with combat boots and a t-shirt. In the field, the jacket may be replaced by the flame resistant Army Combat Shirt when worn directly under a tactical vest. A matching patrol cap is worn when other headgear is not in use.

The ACU was introduced in 2005, replacing the previous Battle Dress Uniform and Desert Camouflage Uniform. The uniform originally featured a pixelated camouflage pattern, known as the Universal Camouflage Pattern (UCP), which was designed for use in woodland, desert, and urban environments, and was worn with a black beret. The black beret was replaced for wear with the ACU by the patrol cap in July 2011; the beret remained in use with the Army Service Uniform. UCP was found to perform poorly in the field, and beginning in 2010, most soldiers operating in Afghanistan were issued ACUs using the commercial MultiCam pattern, which was found to be better suited to that country's terrain. Subsequently, OCP, which is similar to MultiCam, was adopted Army-wide starting in 2015, with UCP fully retired in 2019.

The ACU jacket bears name tapes, rank insignia, and shoulder patches and tabs, as well as recognition devices such as a U.S. flag patch and the infrared (IR) tab. Two U.S. flag insignia are authorized for wear with the ACU, full-color and subdued IR. The U.S. flag insignia is worn on the right shoulder pocket flap of the ACU coat. Unit patches are worn on the left shoulder, while combat patches are worn on the right. The name tapes, rank, and skill badges are either secured with hook-and-loop fasteners or can optionally be sewn on.

==== Maternity Work Uniform ====
The ACU maternity work uniform in the OCP is a daily work and utility uniform for pregnant Soldiers.

==== Aircrew Uniform ====
The Army aircrew combat uniform (A2CU) in the OCP is a daily work, utility, and field uniform for aircrew members and the Fire Resistant Environmental Ensemble (FREE) is designed to be worn with the prescribed duty uniform to provide aviators and CVC with modular, flame-resistant protection.

==== Garrison Culinary Uniform ====
The garrison culinary uniform is the daily work uniform for all enlisted Soldiers in career management field (CMF) 92 who hold the culinary specialist MOS when prescribed by CTA 50–900 and by the commander (see figs 7–1 and 7–2). The culinary management noncommissioned officer (NCO) and dining facility manager uniform are variations.

==== Combat Vehicle Crewman Uniform ====
The CVC uniform in the OCP is a daily work, utility, and field uniform for CVC. The FREE version is designed to be worn with the standard duty uniform to provide aviators and CVC with modular, flame-resistant protection.

==== Physical Fitness Uniform ====
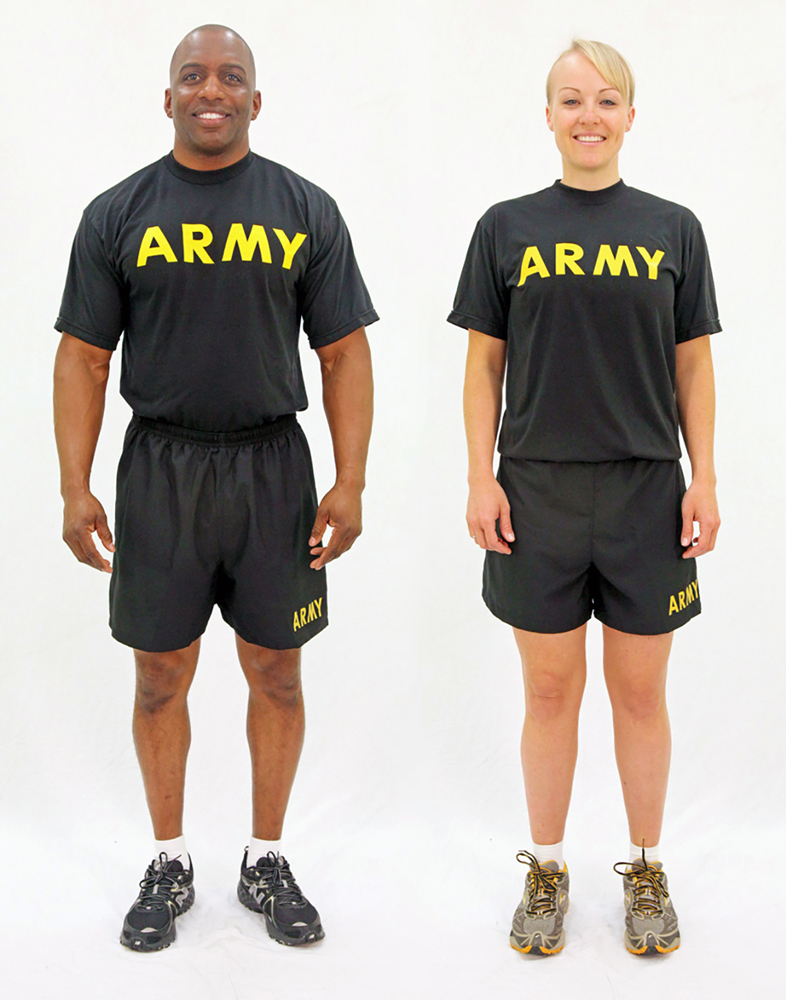
The Army Physical Fitness Uniform in warm-weather configuration

The Army Physical Fitness Uniform (APFU), manufactured by UNICOR and adopted in 2013, is modular, with individual pieces that can be combined or eliminated depending on physical training conditions. All parts of the uniform are styled in black and gold and include track jacket, short-sleeve and long-sleeve T-shirts, track pants, and stretchable running trunks. The uniform was released in October 2014. No standard shoe style is specified to be worn. Soldiers are expected simply to purchase commercial running shoes. Shoes with profane or vulgar logos, as well as "toe shoes", such as the Vibram FiveFingers running shoe, are prohibited.

==== Army Service uniform ====
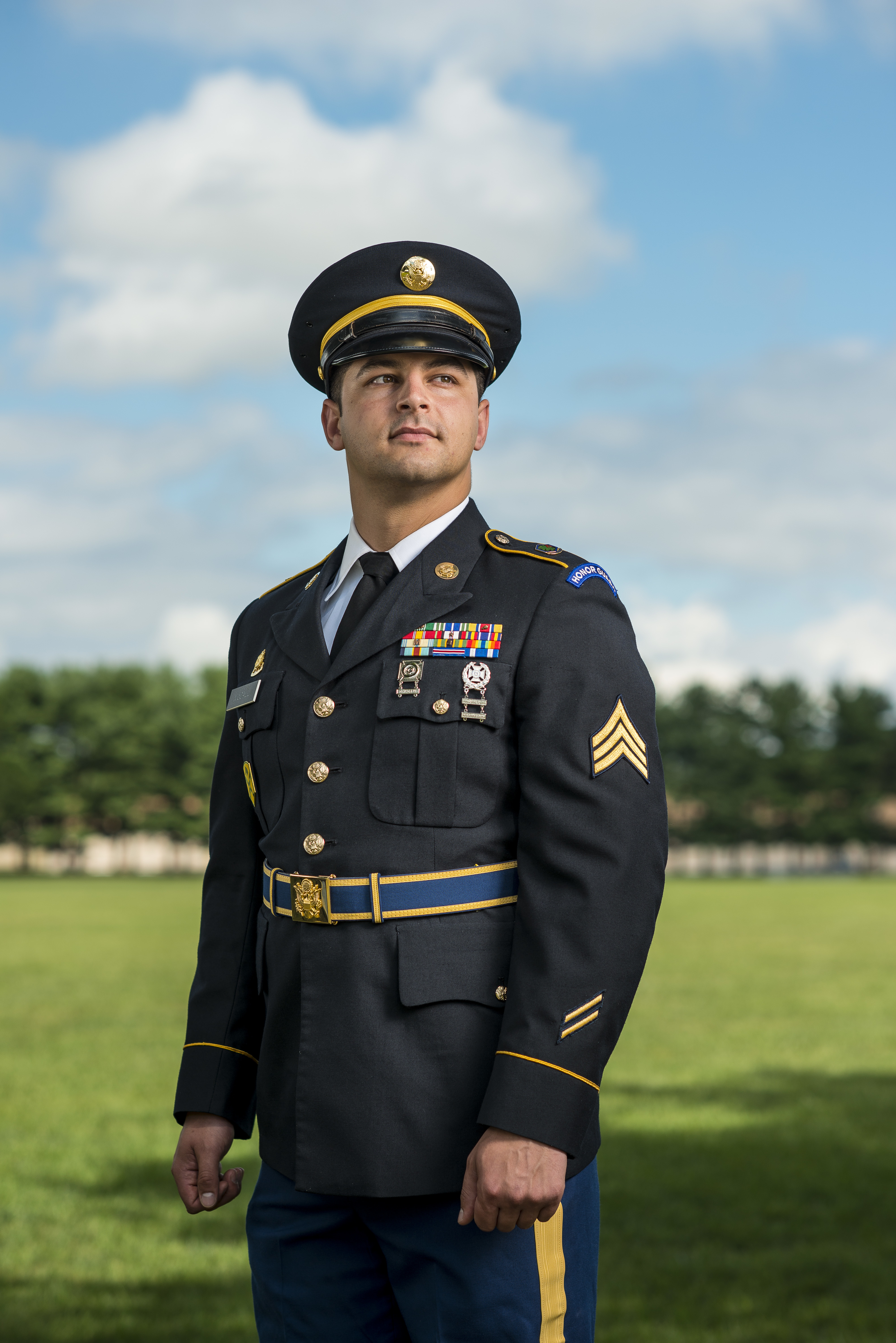
The Army Blue Service Uniform. The blue and gold ceremonial belt is not generally worn by all units

From 2010 to 2020, a blue uniform, known as the Army (Blue) Service Uniform, was used as the daily wear service uniform, replacing in daily wear the previous green service uniform used by all officers and enlisted personnel introduced in 1956. The Army has a tradition of blue uniforms dating to the Revolutionary War. With the introduction of the current green service uniform, the blue uniform returns to its previous position as a formal dress and ceremonial uniform.

==== Army Green Service Uniform ====
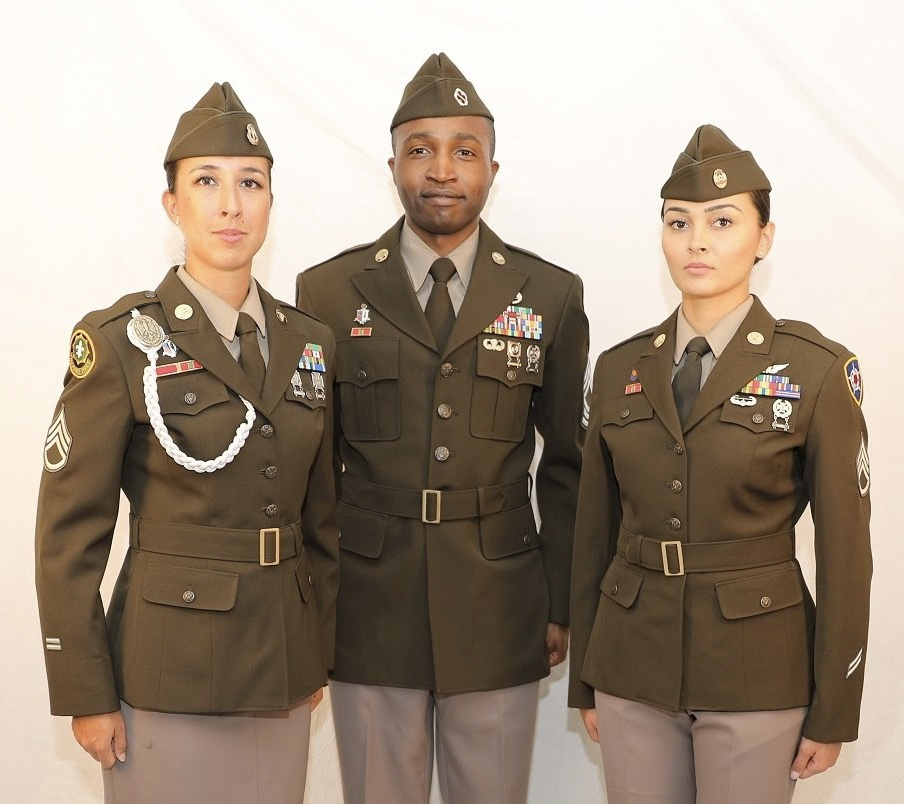
The Army Green Service Uniform

The current garrison service uniform is known as the Army Green Service Uniform. Introduced in late 2018, it is based on the "pinks and greens" officers' service uniform worn in World War II and the Korean War. The service uniform includes a dark olive drab coat, light drab trousers, a tan shirt, an olive drab tie, and brown leather shoes for both men and women, with women having the option to wear a pencil skirt and pumps instead. The uniform became available to soldiers in mid-2020.

==== Blue Mess uniform ====
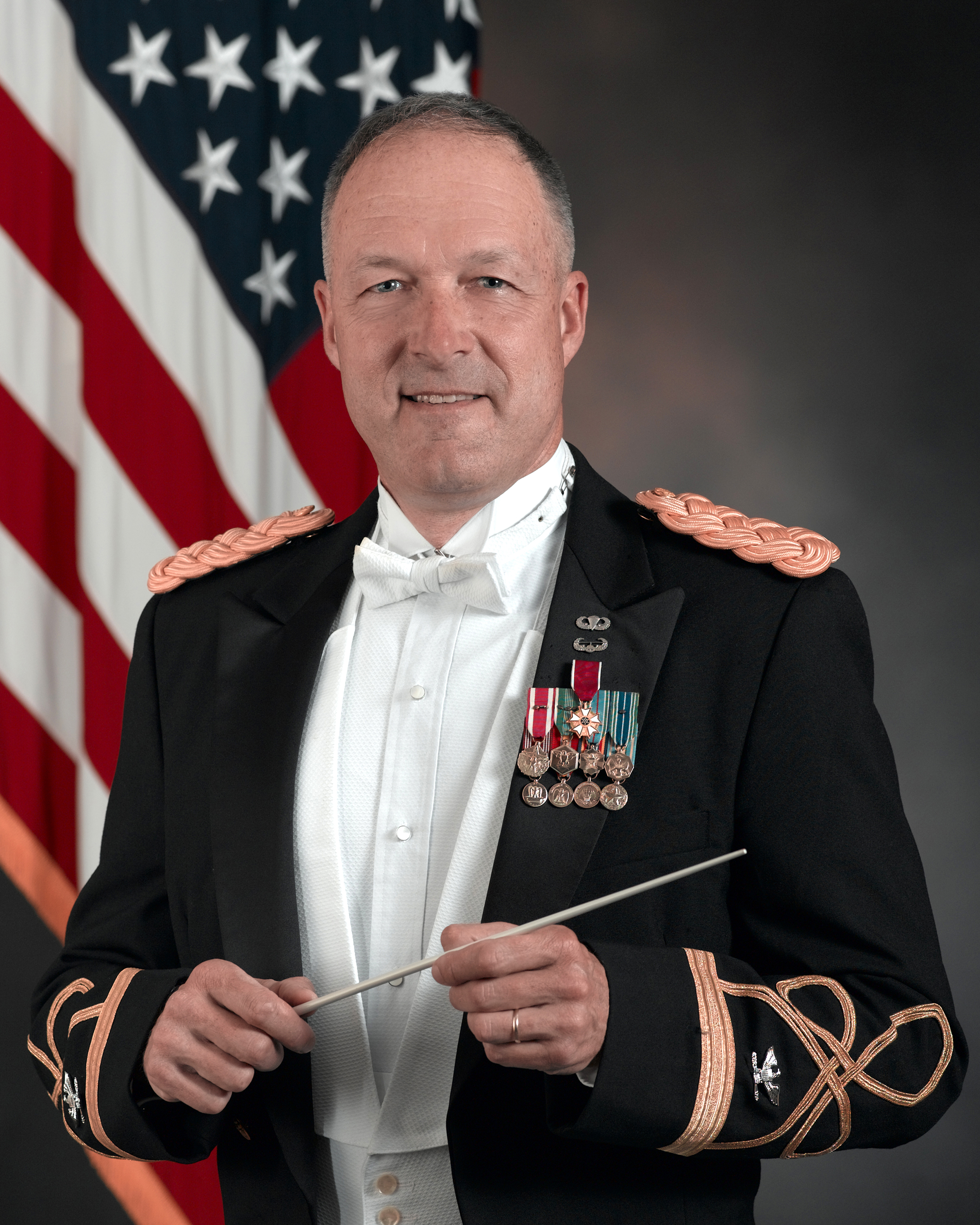
Colonel Palmatier in the "Army Blue Evening Mess Dress", worn as an optional alternative to the Army Blue Mess Uniform by officers from 1902 to the present.

Mess dress is the military term for the formal evening dress worn in the mess or at other formal occasions. This is generally worn as the military equivalent of white tie or black tie. The Army has two versions, a blue winter version and a white summer version, each worn with different accessories depending on the formality of the occasion.

The Army blue mess uniform is considered equivalent to black tie, and consists of the mess jacket, trousers, white semiformal dress shirt with a turndown collar, black bow tie, and black cummerbund. The Army blue evening mess uniform is considered equivalent to white tie/tails, and consists of the same jacket and trousers, but with a white formal dress shirt with a wing collar, white single-breasted vest, and white bow tie.[32]

==== White Mess uniform ====
The Army white mess uniform is a tropical equivalent of the blue mess uniform, and consists of the white mess jacket, trousers, white semiformal dress shirt with a turndown collar, black bow tie, and black cummerbund. The Army white evening mess uniform is a tropical equivalent of the white tie/tails, and consists of the white jacket and trousers, but with a white formal dress shirt with a wing collar, white single-breasted vest, and white bow tie.[32]

General officers wear pants of the same color as the jacket, with two ½–inch, gold-colored braids, spaced ½ inch apart. Current stated uniform regulation for mess dress is that all other officers and enlisted personnel wear lighter blue trousers with a single 1 ½ inch, gold-colored braid. When worn for white tie events, it is worn with a white formal dress shirt with a wing collar, white waistcoat, and white bow tie instead of the black tie versions.

=== Special ceremonial units ===
U.S. Army uniform regulations define a class of "special ceremonial units" (SCUs), which include guards units and bands, that are authorized to wear distinctive uniforms – in lieu of the Army Service Uniform – for public duties, including state arrivals, official funerals, change-of-command and retirement ceremonies, and the presidential inaugural parade.

Examples of SCU uniforms

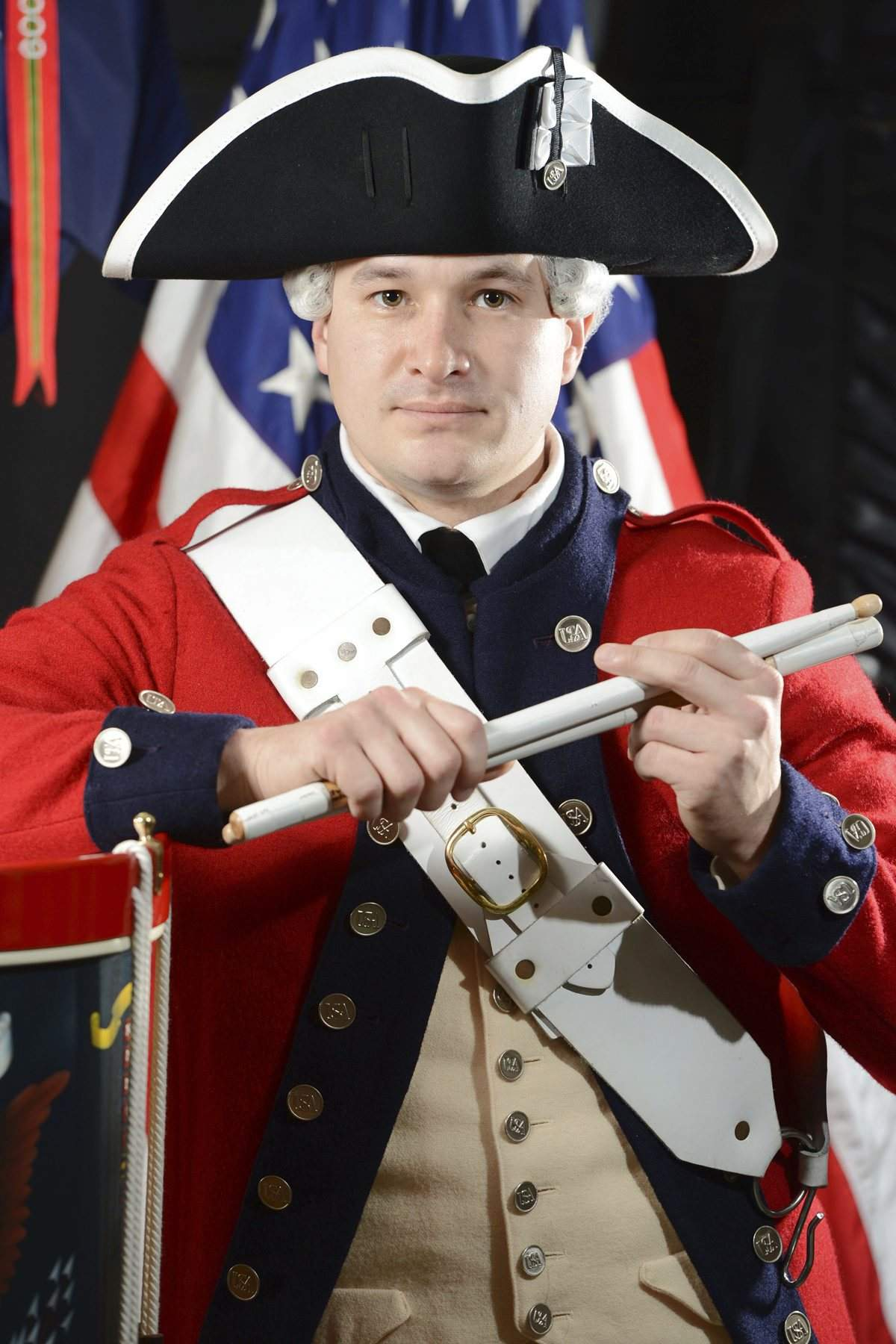
Uniform of a drummer in the Old Guard Fife and Drum Corps (3rd US Infantry Regiment)

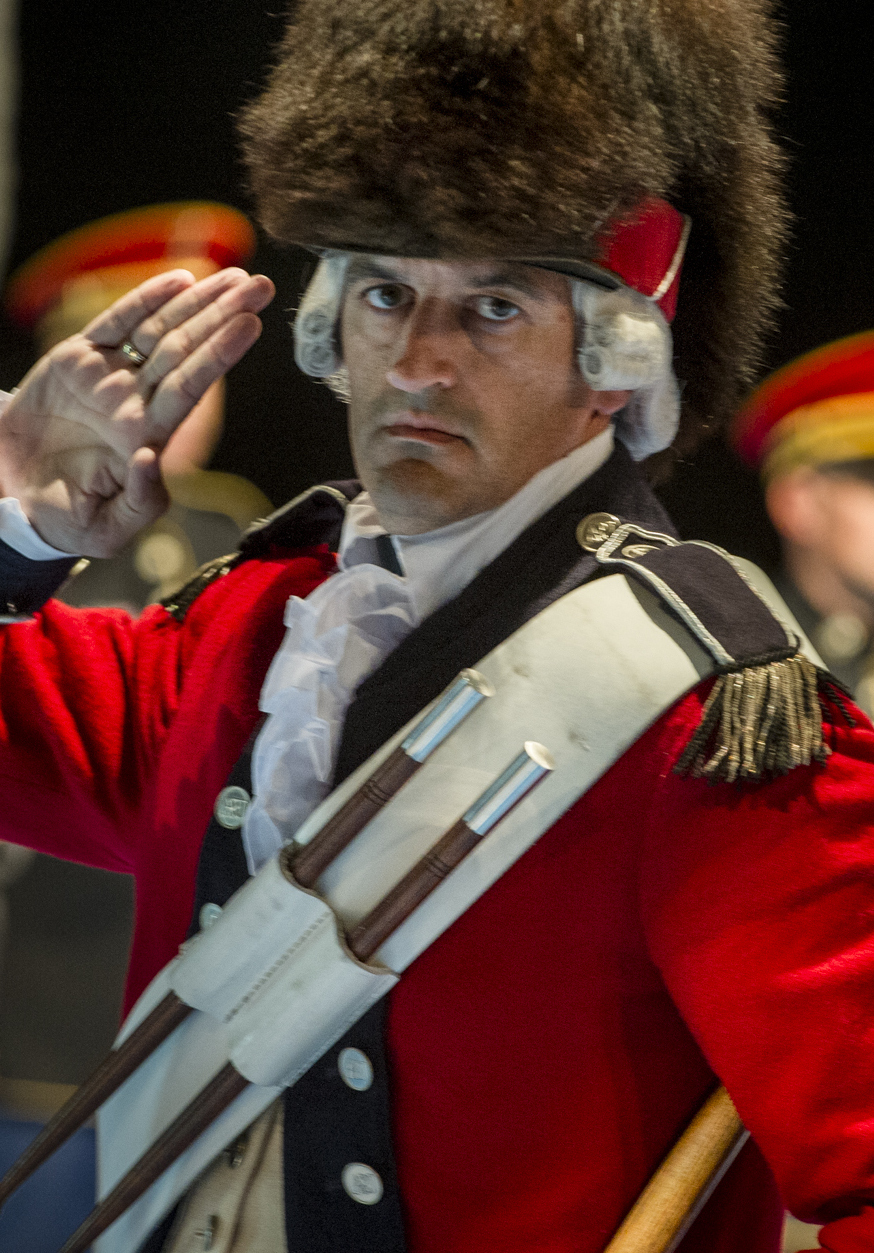
Uniform of a drum major in the Old Guard Fife and Drum Corps

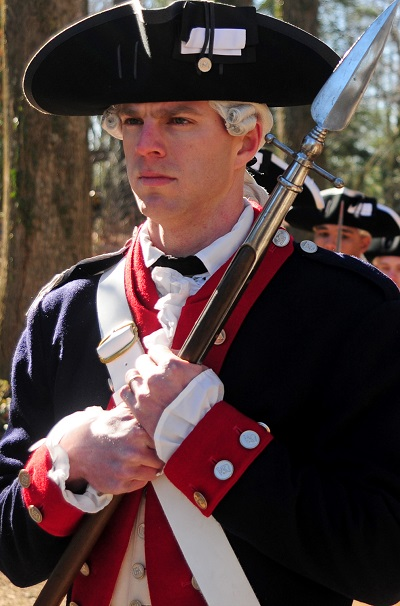
Uniform of a sergeant in the Commander-in-Chief's Guard

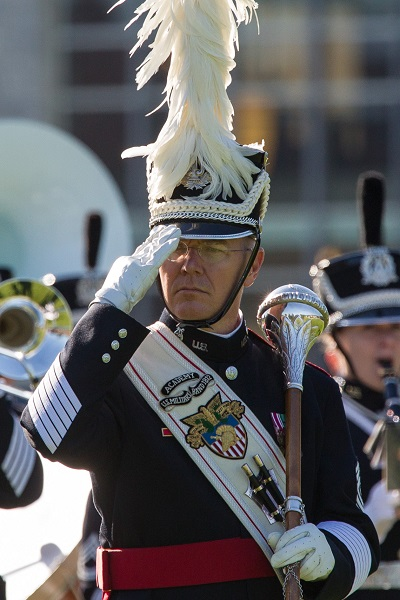
Uniform of a drum major in the West Point Band

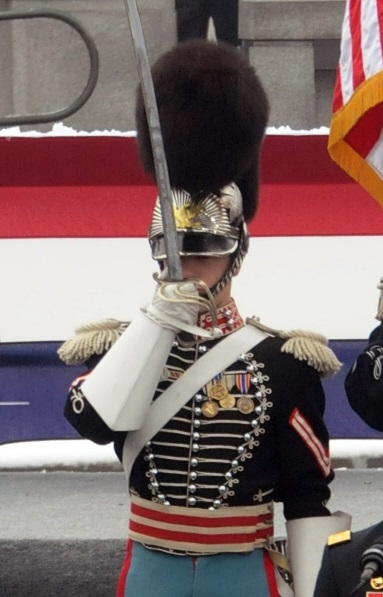
Uniform of a corporal in the First Troop Philadelphia City Cavalry

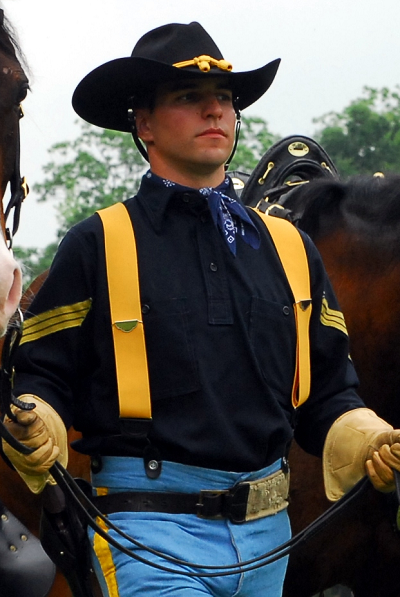
Uniform of a sergeant in the 1st Cavalry Division Horse Cavalry Detachment

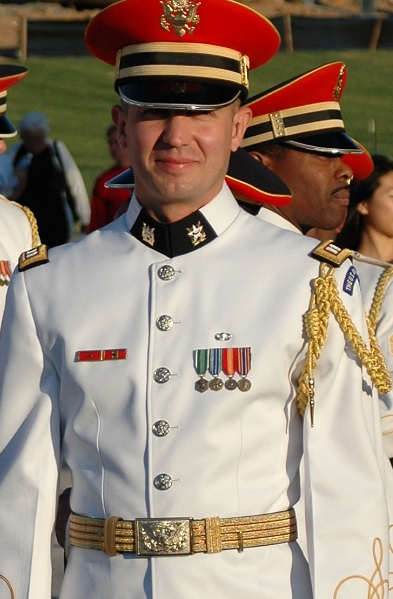
Uniform of a U.S. Army Herald Trumpeter

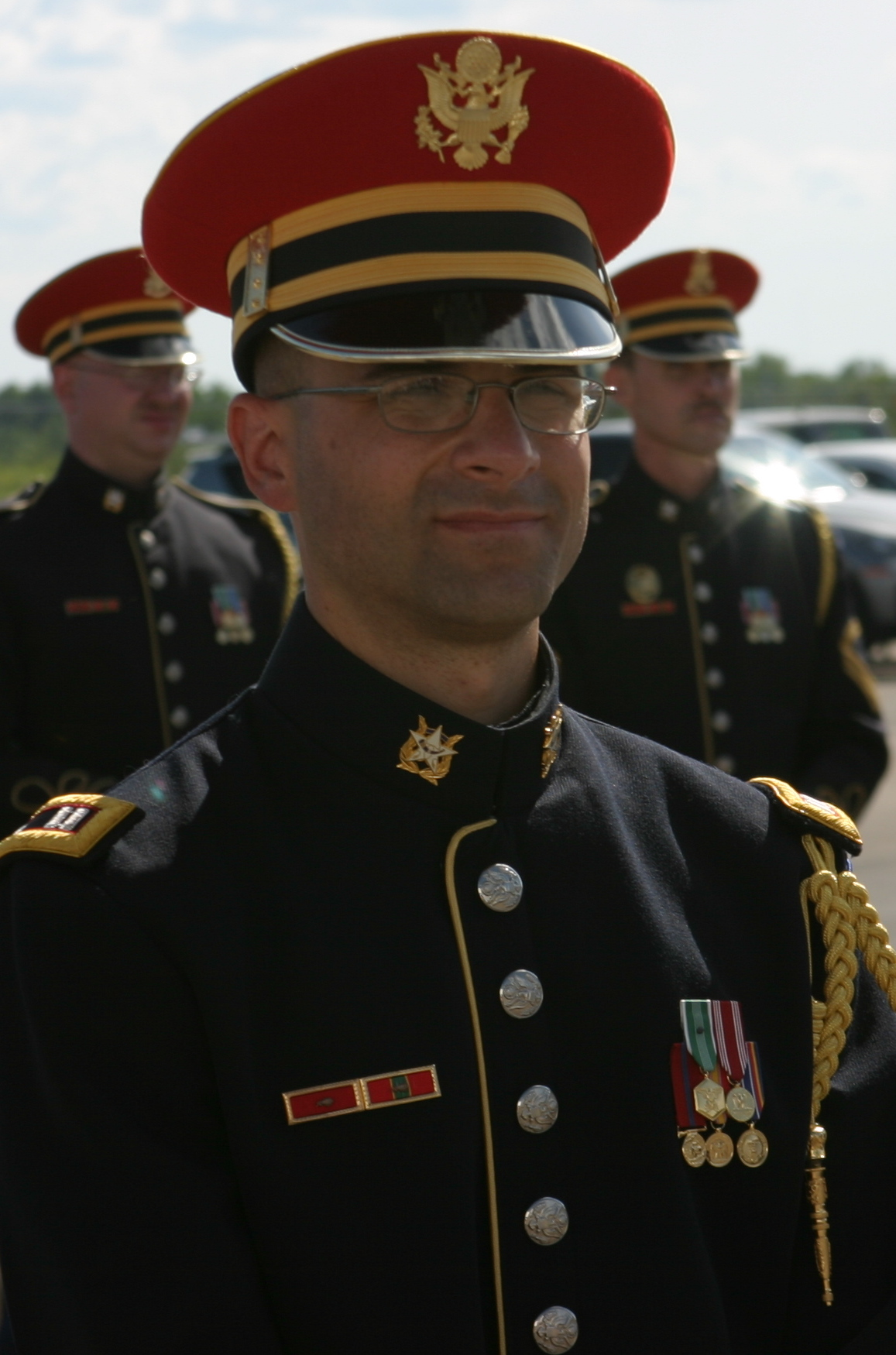
Uniform of a U.S. Army Special Bandsman

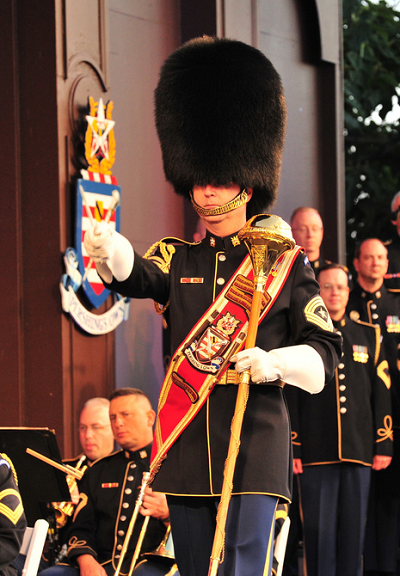
Uniform of a U.S. Army Special Band drum major

==== Bands ====
The U.S. Army has 34 active-duty bands and more than 50 reserve bands. Most of these units wear the Army Service Uniform for public duties; however, certain units – primarily located in the National Capital Region – have unit-specific uniforms that are used for special occasions. Unlike the Army Service Uniform, these specialized uniforms are, for budgetary reasons, generally issued to units – instead of individuals – and returned to the unit following the soldier's departure.

The U.S. Army Band "Pershing's Own", the U.S. Army Field Band, and the U.S. Army Herald Trumpets wear a parade uniform designed by the U.S. Army Institute of Heraldry and introduced in 1969 for the inauguration of Richard Nixon. The uniform blouse has a choker-style collar, instead of the open collar used on the Army Service Uniform, and eight buttons, representing the eight notes of the musical scale. Decorative gold braid adorns the cuffs and standard army cover is replaced by a crimson peaked hat, while drum majors wear a bearskin helmet. A summer white blouse is also available. In the 1950s "Pershing's Own" briefly wore a yellow and black uniform known as "the Lion Tamer" due to its resemblance to a circus costume. Before World War II, the band's uniform was a grey variation of the standard dress blue uniform.

The 3rd Infantry Regiment Fife and Drum Corps wear red, open-front regimental coats, white coveralls, and black tri-corner hats.

The U.S. Military Academy Band—a full-time band assigned to the U.S. Military Academy at West Point—wears distinctive, high-collared navy jackets with white accessories and dark shakos. From 1875 to 1890 the band wore pickelhaube instead of shakos.

==== Guards ====
The Commander-in-Chief's Guard, part of the 3rd Infantry Regiment, uses a special dress uniform that is evocative of the uniform worn by Gen. George Washington's life guard. It consists of open-front, blue regimental coats, white coveralls, and black tricorner hats.

The First Troop Philadelphia City Cavalry (a Pennsylvania National Guard unit) has a special full-dress uniform known for its distinctive helmet with extravagant bearskin roach.

The 1st Cavalry Division's Horse Detachment was given status as a Special Ceremonial Unit in 1972. Their parade uniform consists of a navy "fireman's shirt", worn with Columbia blue trousers with yellow piping. Accoutrements include a divisional kerchief worn around the neck and yellow suspenders. Cover is the Cavalry Stetson.

Other non-band SCU units with distinctive uniforms include the 54th Massachusetts Volunteer Infantry.

=== Cadet uniforms ===
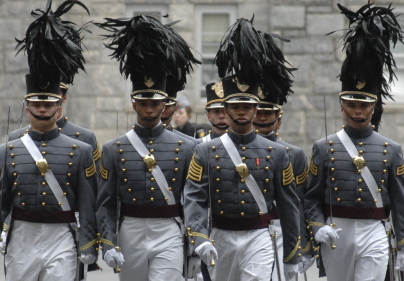
U.S. Military Academy cadets in spring parade uniform

==== West Point ====
Cadets enrolled at the United States Military Academy at West Point wear standard Army uniforms, including the Army Combat Uniform and the Army Physical Fitness Uniform, but also use several unique uniforms for drills and daily wear in lieu of the Army Service Uniform. Since 1816, West Point cadet uniforms have been styled in cadet grey which continues to be the primary color used in academy dress.

Spring parade dress consists of cadet grey swallow-tail coats with 21-gold buttons, a standing collar, white trousers, and black shakos (known as a "tarbucket hat" in U.S. Army nomenclature). Winter parade dress is similar to spring parade dress, though trousers are colored cadet gray instead of white. This same uniform is worn without the black shakos hat and with the gray or white peaked service cap depending on the season when not parading but still required for formal events. For evening formal events, no headgear is worn.

Summer dress ("India Whites") consist of a white overblouse with a standing collar, white trousers and white peaked service caps. Service dress (“white over gray”) consists of grey trousers, short sleeve white shirts with shoulder boards, and white peaked caps. "Dress Gray" uniforms consist of gray blouses with a standing collar and trimmed with a one-inch black mohair braid band, gray trousers and gray peaked caps. In cold weather, a gray Long Overcoat is worn over the uniform. The daily service uniform ("As for Class") consists of gray trousers, charcoal gray shirts in long sleeve and short sleeve variants and garrison caps.

==== Senior military colleges ====
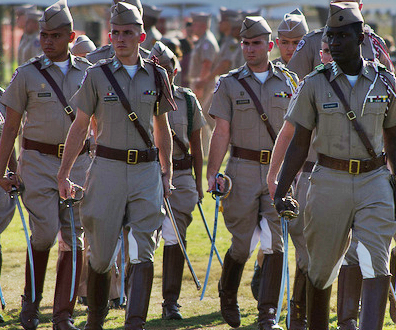
Officers of the Texas A&M University Corps of Cadets in "Class Bravos (Summer)," the daily garrison uniform

Cadets at senior military colleges are authorized, under Army Regulation 670–1, to wear uniforms developed by their institutions. Regular U.S. Army personnel assigned to those units as instructors may also wear institutionally developed uniforms in lieu of standard army dress. Most corps of cadets at senior military colleges wear uniforms loosely patterned on that of the U.S. Military Academy at West Point. One exception is Texas A&M University which has several styles of cadet dress uniforms modeled after Army officers uniforms of World War II. The corps' special ceremonial unit, the Ross Volunteers, wear an all-white parade uniform with peaked hat, and the Fish Drill Team, the corps' all-freshman rifle drill squad, wears the "Midnight" uniform with black "paratrooper" boots, white belts, and black polished combat helmet with chromed brass.

==== ROTC and Junior ROTC units ====
Reserve Officer Training Corps (ROTC) and Junior ROTC (JROTC) cadets wear the Army Service Uniform (ASU), the Army Combat Uniform and the Physical Training Uniform with some differences in rank, insignia and headgear for the JROTC cadet ASU. Junior ROTC cadets wear grey shirts instead of white shirts and grey berets instead of black berets with their Army service uniform. Some ROTC programs do not use the ASU regularly or at all, as it partially depends on if the ROTC battalion is well-funded or not.

=== Special uniform situations ===
==== Special covers ====
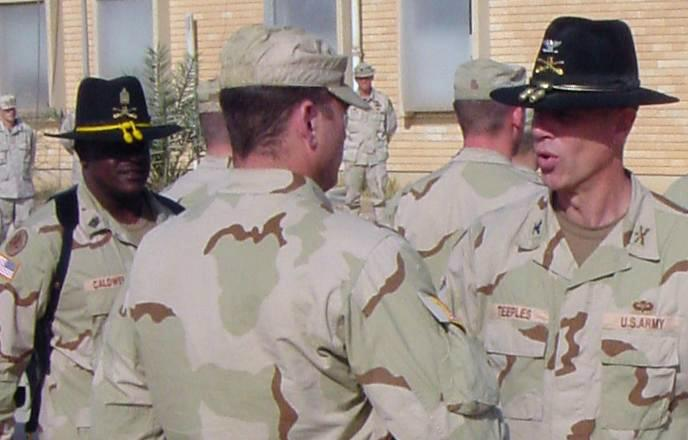
An officer and NCO with the 3rd Armored Cavalry Regiment wearing Cavalry Stetsons

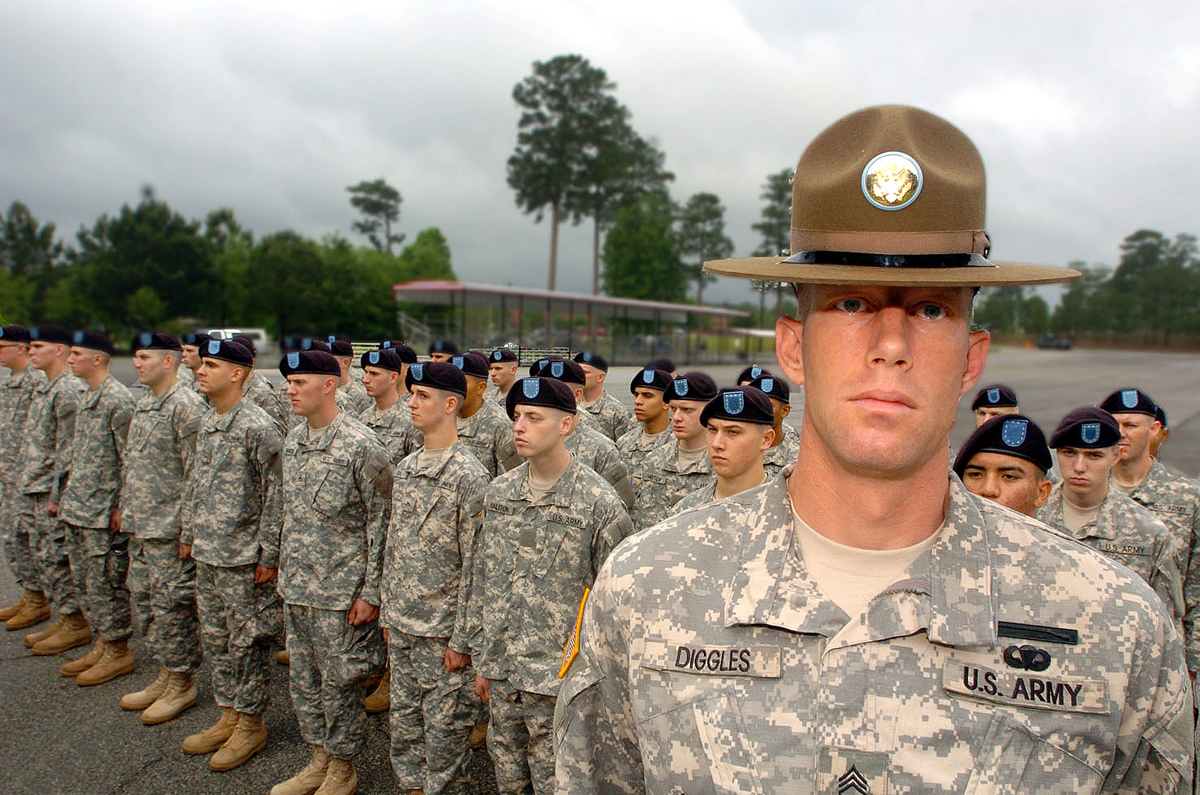
A Drill Sergeant wearing a campaign cover.

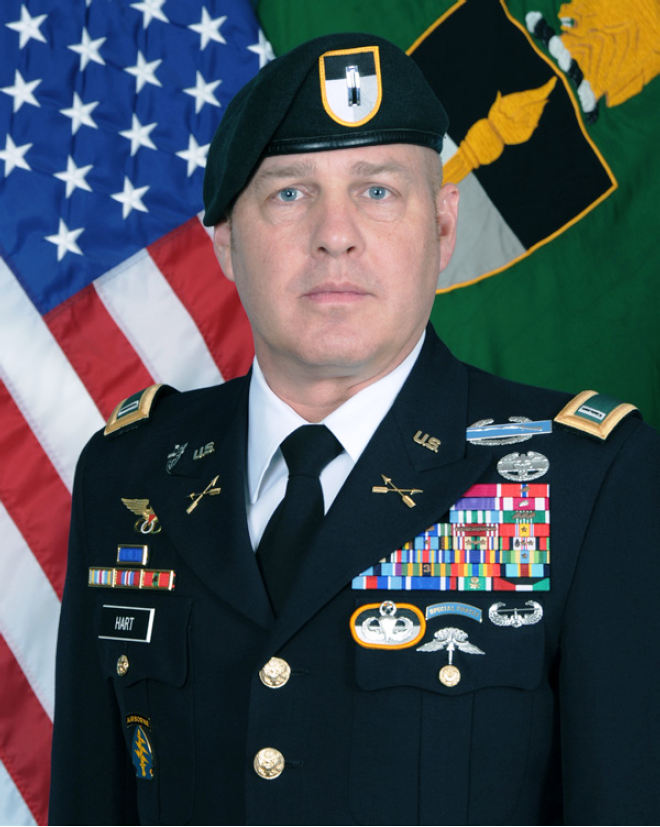
A warrant officer with the JFK Special Warfare Center and School wearing a green beret.

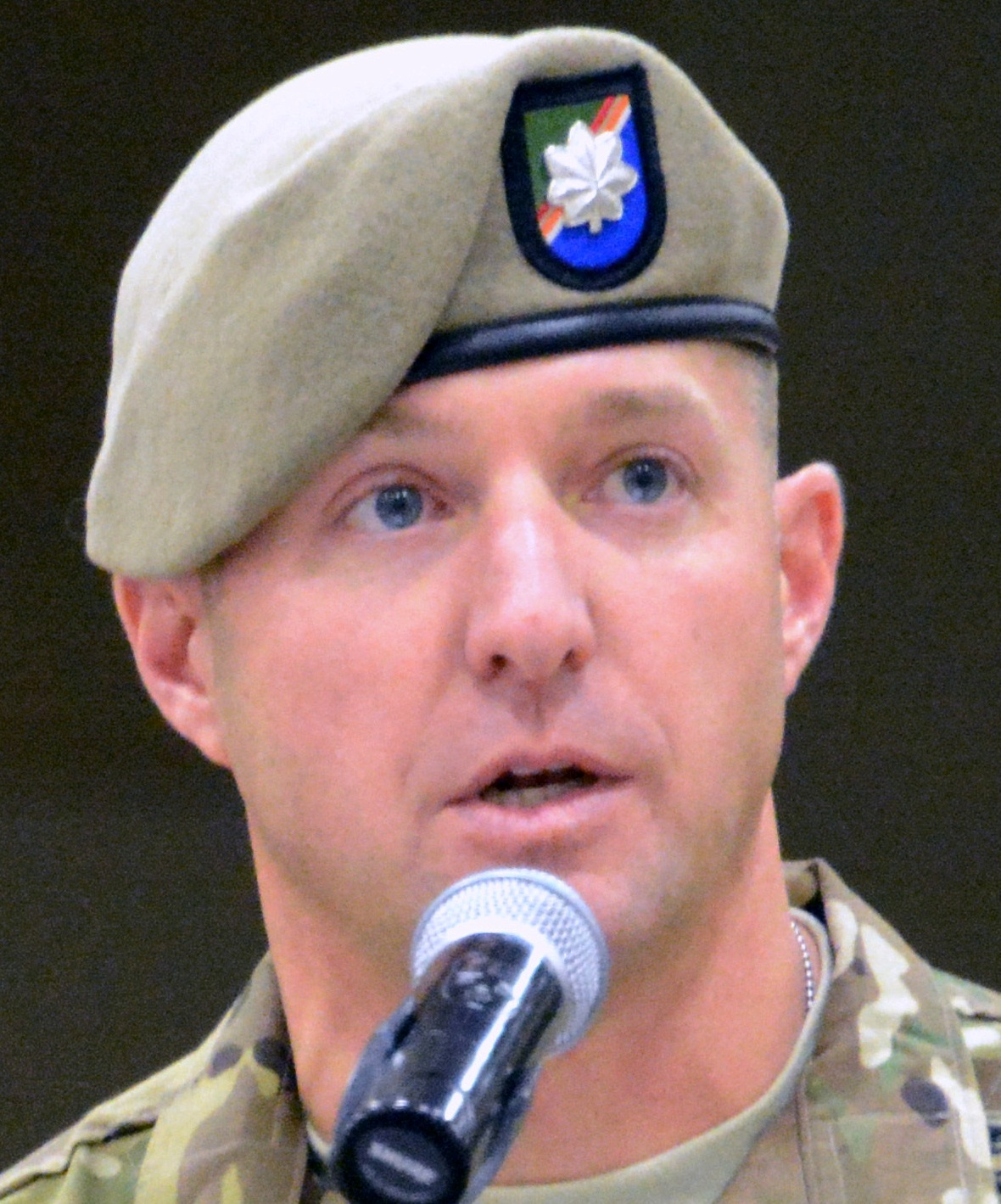
An officer with the 75th Ranger Regiment wearing a tan beret.

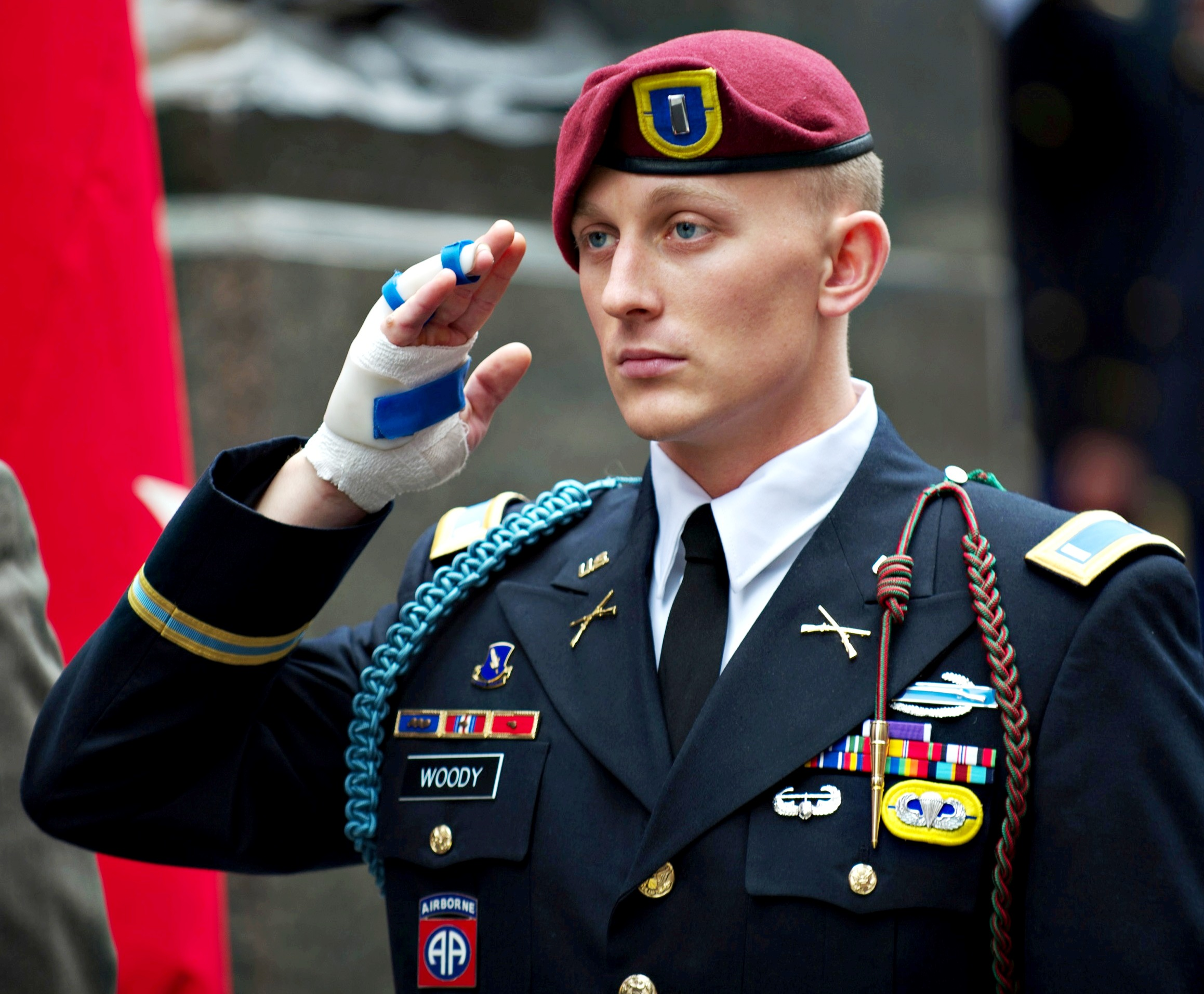
An officer with the 82nd Airborne Division wearing a maroon beret. Take note of the French Fourragère (seen on his left shoulder), a unit-specific uniform decoration.

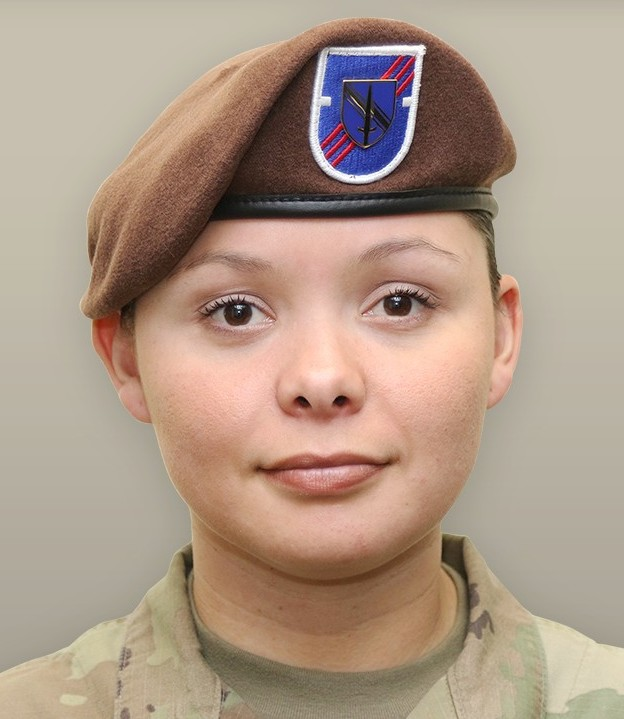
A soldier with 1st Security Force Assistance Brigade wearing a brown beret.

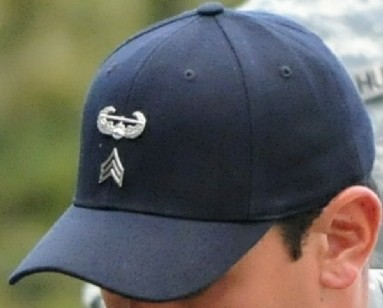
An Air Assault instructor wearing a special skills instructor cap.

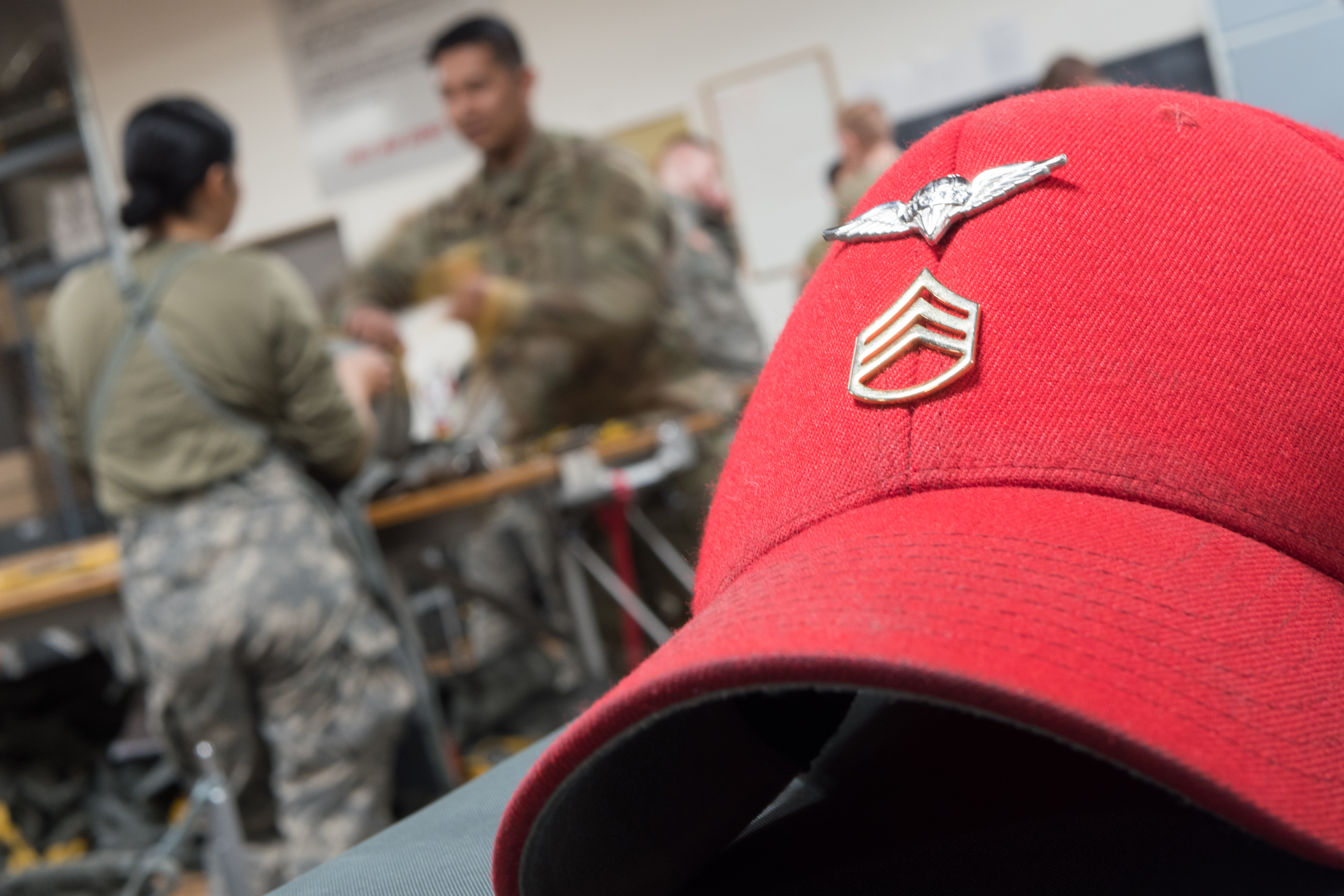
An Army special skills parachute rigger cap.

Soldiers assigned to the cavalry units may, during certain divisional functions, replace their standard army soft cover with the “Cavalry Stetson”, a black Stetson with yellow braid (gold for officers) and cavalry branch insignia.

U.S. Army Drill Sergeants are authorized to wear a campaign hat while in the Army Combat Uniform. First adopted in 1911, the campaign hat was abandoned for drill instructor use during World War II, but readopted in 1964. Army campaign hats are olive green with the Great Seal of the United States centered on the front of the hat on a gold disc.

Several berets in alternate colors to the Army standard black beret are also used. Personnel assigned to units trained and equipped for parachute infiltration, known as airborne forces—such as the 82nd Airborne Division—are authorized to wear a maroon beret while soldiers assigned to the 75th Ranger Regiment wear tan berets. Soldiers who graduate from the Special Forces Qualification Course are authorized to wear a green beret. The Army's newest units, the Security Force Assistance Brigades (SFABs), are authorized to wear a dark brown beret.

The U.S. Army has also authorized the wear of distinctive baseball-style caps for some personnel. Special skill instructors are authorized the wear of black hats, while parachute riggers are allowed red caps. In addition, platoon trainers for the Army National Guard's Officer Candidate School and Warrant Officer Candidate school wear a Black patrol cap, with a non subdued rank insignia and a name embroidered in gold lettering.

==== Highland dress ====
The U.S. Army tartan, designed by Strathmore Woollen Company, is black, khaki, blue, gold, and two shades of green. The United States Army Psychological Operations Regiment has a separate tartan of green, black, red, gray and white. However, there are currently no U.S. Army units that use Highland dress and the wearing of the kilt with U.S. Army uniforms is not permitted by Army regulations. Among armies in the five UKUSA Agreement nations, only the United States and New Zealand do not actively field Scottish units, though both nations have done so in the past.

Nonetheless, in keeping with U.S. Army uniform regulations that permit cadet commands at the U.S. Military Academy and the senior military colleges to introduce institution-specific uniforms, members of the bagpipe bands at the United States Military Academy, The Citadel, Norwich University, the Virginia Military Institute, and the Virginia Tech Corps of Cadets wear a Highland uniform while performing as part of their respective ensembles. These uniforms are patterned on collegiate tartans instead of the U.S. Army tartan. The Oregon Civil Defense Force (OSDF) fielded a pipe band, until 2015, that wore a modified Highland uniform, including kilt and sporran, authorized by the Oregon Military Department.

== See also ==
- Berets of the United States Army
- Uniforms of the United States Armed Forces
