= Benjamin Francis Leftwich =

English singer-songwriter

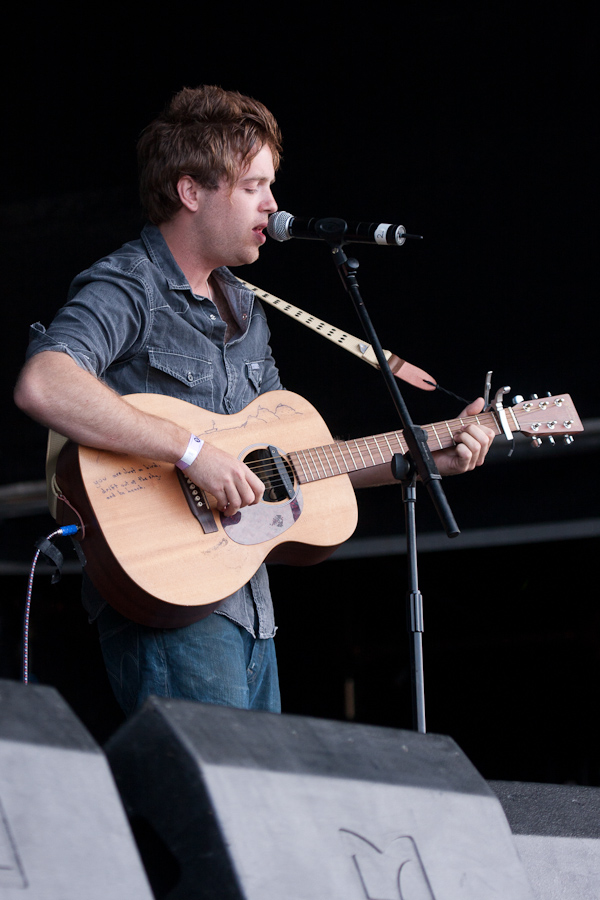
- Performing at Jersey Live in 2011

Background information
- Origin: York, England
- Genres: Indie folk, acoustic
- Occupations: Singer, songwriter
- Instruments: Vocals, guitar, piano
- Years active: 2006–present
- Label: Dirty Hit
- Website: benjaminfrancisleftwich.com

Benjamin Francis Leftwich is an English singer-songwriter from York. He released his first album Last Smoke Before the Snowstorm in 2011, which peaked at #35 on the UK charts. He has released four further albums since, the most recent in February 2024. Leftwich has also co-written with other artists, including The 1975, Holly Humberstone, and CMAT.

== Early life and influences ==
Benjamin Francis Leftwich's father was Adrian Leftwich.

Leftwich began playing at the age of ten and grew up listening to the Rolling Stones and Nina Simone, later discovering Nick Drake, Bob Dylan, and Elliott Smith. He cites Cher, Arcade Fire, Ryan Adams, and Bruce Springsteen as inspirations.

== Career ==
Leftwich's debut album, the Ian Grimble-produced Last Smoke Before the Snowstorm, was released in July 2011. The Fly called it "a majestic debut" The Skinny, while the Sunday Express called it "lovely". Hazel Sheffield, writing in The Guardian, gave it a 3/5 rating, as did David Pollock, writing for The Scotsman, who drew comparisons to Damien Rice and José González. Leftwich's "Shine" was named Spotify's most addictive track of 2014, the most repeat-played song of the year. Leftwich sold more than 100,000 copies of Last Smoke and received over 150 million global Spotify plays. "Atlas Hands" was featured in Zillow's TV Commercial 'Lake House' in 2015 In this same year, Benjamin Francis Leftwich co-wrote "Grow" with British artist Frances which featured in the Amazon UK TV advert.

His second album, After the Rain, was released in August 2016. Performing songs off this album and the previous one, Leftwich toured extensively from April 2016 to August 2017, covering the UK, Canada, USA, China, Sweden, Denmark, Germany, the Netherlands, and throughout Asia (e.g., Hong Kong, Singapore, Indonesia).

Albums Gratitude, To Carry A Whale and Some Things Break followed in 2019, 2021, and 2024 respectively.

As well as writing and recording his own music, Leftwich co-writes with other artists, and has collaborated with The 1975, Holly Humberstone, and CMAT, among others.

== Personal life ==
In February 2024, Leftwich said that he had previously had problems with alcohol and drug addiction, but had been sober since 2019.

== Discography ==
=== Albums ===
Title	Details	Chart positions
Title	Details	UK
Last Smoke Before the Snowstorm	Released: 3 July 2011; Label: Dirty Hit; Format: CD, LP, digital download	35
After the Rain	Released: 19 August 2016; Label: Dirty Hit; Format: CD, LP, digital download	53
Gratitude	Released: 15 March 2019; Label: Dirty Hit; Format: CD, LP, digital download	–
To Carry a Whale	Released: 18 June 2021; Label: Dirty Hit; Format: CD, LP, digital download	–
Some Things Break	Released: 9 February 2024; Label: Dirty Hit; Format:: CD, LP, digital download	–

=== EPs ===
Title	Details
A Million Miles Out	Released: 24 October 2010; Label: Dirty Hit; Format: Digital download
Pictures	Released: 6 March 2011; Label: Dirty Hit; Format: Digital download
In the Open	Released: 19 October 2012; Label: Dirty Hit; Format: Digital download
Elephant	Released: 8 November 2019; Label: Dirty Hit; Format: Digital download

=== Singles ===
Year	Single	Peak chart positions	Album
Year	Single	UK	Album
2011	"Box of Stones"	195	Last Smoke Before the Snowstorm
2011	"Atlas Hands"	—	Last Smoke Before the Snowstorm
2012	"Pictures"	—	Last Smoke Before the Snowstorm
2014	"Shine"	—	Last Smoke Before the Snowstorm
2016	"Tilikum"	—	After the Rain
2016	"Mayflies"	—	After the Rain
2016	"Summer"	—	After the Rain
2016	"Groves"	—	After the Rain
2017	"Pure Morning" cover	—	
2017	"Because of Toledo" cover	—	
