= Last Smoke Before the Snowstorm =

Studio album by Benjamin Francis Leftwich
- Released: 3 July 2011
- Recorded: 2010–11
- Genre: Alternative
- Length: 31:20
- Label: Dirty Hit

Benjamin Francis Leftwich chronology
Last Smoke Before the Snowstorm (2011)	After the Rain (2016)

Singles from Last Smoke Before the Snowstorm
- 1. "Box of Stones" Released: 19 June 2011; 2. "Atlas Hands" Released: 5 September 2011; 3. "Pictures" Released: 20 February 2012; 4. "Shine" Released: April 2014

Last Smoke Before the Snowstorm is the debut studio album from English singer-songwriter Benjamin Francis Leftwich, it was released on 3 July 2011 in the United Kingdom. It peaked at No. 35 on the UK Albums Chart

== Singles ==
- "Box of Stones" was released as the first single on 19 June 2011. It peaked at No. 195 on the UK Singles Chart.
- "Atlas Hands" was released as the second single on 5 September 2011.
- "Pictures" was released as the third single on 20 February 2012.
- Years later, "Shine" was released as the fourth single in April 2014, when Norwegian electronic musician Kygo made a remix of the track.

== Track listing ==
No.	Title	Length
1.	"Pictures"	2:57
2.	"Box of Stones"	2:41
3.	"1904"	4:03
4.	"Butterfly Culture"	2:57
5.	"Atlas Hands"	2:53
6.	"Stole You Away"	3:36
7.	"Shine"	2:58
8.	"Snowship"	2:14
9.	"Last Smoke Before the Snowstorm"	3:07
10.	"Don't Go Slow"	3:54

iTunes Bonus tracks
No.	Title	Length
11.	"Bottle Baby"	2:36
12.	"Atlas Hands" (Music video)	2:49
13.	"Pictures" (Music video)	2:57

== Chart performance ==
On 10 July 2011, Last Smoke Before the Snowstorm entered the UK Albums Chart at number 35.

Chart (2011)	Peak position
UK Albums Chart	35

== Release history ==
Country	Date	Format	Label
United Kingdom	3 July 2011	Digital download	Dirty Hit
United Kingdom	4 July 2011	CD	Dirty Hit
