= Stonesifer =

Stonesifer is a surname. Notable people with the surname include:

- Don Stonesifer (born 1927), American football player
- Patty Stonesifer (born 1956), American business executive
- Richard J. Stonesifer (1922–1999), fifth President of Monmouth University

== See also ==
- Stonecipher
