= Box of Stones =

Single by Benjamin Francis Leftwich

from the album Last Smoke Before the Snowstorm
- Released: 19 June 2011
- Recorded: 2010–11
- Genre: Alternative
- Length: 2:47
- Label: Dirty Hit
- Songwriter(s): Leftwich

Benjamin Francis Leftwich singles chronology
"Box of Stones" (2011)	"Atlas Hands" (2011)

"Box of Stones" is the debut single by English singer-songwriter Benjamin Francis Leftwich, from his debut studio album Last Smoke Before the Snowstorm (2011). It was released on 19 June 2011 as a digital download in the United Kingdom. The song has peaked to number 195 on the UK Singles Chart and number 24 on the UK Indie Chart.

== Music video ==
A music video to accompany the release of "Box of Stones" was first released onto YouTube on 3 May 2011 at a total length of three minutes.

== Track listing ==
Digital download
No.	Title	Length
1.	"Box of Stones"	2:47

== Chart performance ==
Chart (2011)	Peak position
UK Indie (OCC)	24
UK Singles (The Official Charts Company)	195

== Release history ==
Region	Date	Format	Label
United Kingdom	19 June 2011	Digital download	Dirty Hit
