= Gratitude (Benjamin Francis Leftwich album) =

Studio album by Benjamin Francis Leftwich
- Released: 15 March 2019
- Genre: Singer-songwriter
- Length: 40:32
- Label: Dirty Hit
- Producer: Beatriz Artola

Benjamin Francis Leftwich chronology
After the Rain (2016)	Gratitude (2019)	To Carry a Whale (2021)

Professional ratings
Review scores
Source	Rating
Drowned in Sound	6/10
The Skinny	2/5 stars

Gratitude is the third studio album by English singer-songwriter Benjamin Francis Leftwich. It was released in March 2019 under Dirty Hit.

== Track listing ==
No.	Title	Length
1.	"Gratitude"	2:49
2.	"Look Ma!"	2:56
3.	"Sometimes"	3:54
4.	"Big Fish"	4:03
5.	"Tell Me You Started to Pray"	3:00
6.	"Luzern"	3:07
7.	"I Got You"	3:56
8.	"Real Friends"	3:16
9.	"Blue Dress"	3:30
10.	"Miracle Sister"	2:52
11.	"Roísín"	3:42
12.	"The Mess We Make"	3:27
