= Toe shoe =

Toe shoe may refer to:

- Pointe shoe, used by ballet dancers when dancing on the tips of toes
- Vibram FiveFingers, a type of shoe with individual toe pockets
- Minimalist shoe, a shoe designed to mimic barefoot conditions, some of which feature individual toe pockets
- Peep-toe shoe, a shoe with an opening near the toe
- Steel-toe boot, a shoe with protective steel shell
