= Paul Druecke =

American artist (born 1964)

- Born: 1964 (age 61–62); Milwaukee, Wisconsin, U.S.
- Education: Milwaukee Institute of Art & Design (BFA)
- Occupation: Artist
- Website: www.pauldruecke.com

Paul Druecke (born 1964, Milwaukee, Wisconsin) is an American artist who works at the intersections of poetry, sculpture, video, and photography. His work was included in the 2014 Whitney Biennial at the Whitney Museum of American Art and anthologized in Wiley Blackwell’s Companion to Public Art. His project, A Social Event Archive (1997 – 2007) foreshadowed the role of social media in blurring boundaries between personal and public. The Archive was the focus of a solo exhibition at the Milwaukee Art Museum (2017) on the 20th anniversary of its inception.

== Life ==
Paul Druecke received a B.F.A. in 1987 from the Milwaukee Institute of Art & Design. Between 1996–2001, Druecke's one-person organization, Art Street Window, oversaw an innovative series of site-specific installations in vacant downtown storefronts. Druecke received a Mary L. Nohl Fellowship for Established Artists in 2010. His work was included in the 2014 Whitney Biennial at the Whitney Museum of American Art. In 2015 he was invited to throw out the first pitch for the Milwaukee Brewers in recognition of artistic contributions.

== Work ==
Paul Druecke works with a variety of materials and approaches: landmarks, snapshots, beacons, litter, and kitchen routines become sculptures, books, cooking programs, and public interventions.

Matt Wild writes of Druecke's YouTube series “Milwaukee Kitchen is the antidote for modern cooking shows (and everything else).” Andrew Goldstein, writes “A Social Event Archive is viewed as having prefigured social sites like Instagram by inviting people to give him personal snapshots that he then displayed.” David Robbins describes the Archive as “a People’s Photography,” and writes “... Paul Druecke is fascinated by the collective mind. The platform he’s invented employs both pictorial and structural means to present it.” Mary L. Schumacher writes about Blue Dress Park, "I've come to believe that idiosyncratic, creative form of can-do spirit on the part of some of Milwaukee's more independent minded artists is one of our city's more defining assets." Ned Marto writes of his recent project “America Pastime is unique in that it represents perhaps one of the first social practice-based art projects in the age of quarantine.” Donna Stonecipher summarizes Druecke's nuanced art practice in her essay Garden Path (2014), “As such, the work fits perfectly into Druecke's body of work, which ingeniously and tenaciously examines the fault lines of social space using a variety of idiosyncratic approaches.”

A discussion of Druecke's work, co-authored with Amanda Douberley, is included in the anthology, Blackwell Companion to Public Art (2016). Druecke has published two books, Life and Death on the Bluffs (2014) and The Last Days of John Budgen Jr. (2010), with Green Gallery Press.

== Exhibiting Venues ==
Whitney Museum of American Art Marlborough Chelsea Kolnischer Kunstverein Outpost for Contemporary Art Milwaukee Art Museum Contemporary Art Museum Houston Project Row Houses Indianapolis Museum of Art INOVA Lynden Sculpture Garden The Poor Farm Many Mini Residency Aurora Picture Show The Green Gallery Hermetic Gallery Liverpool Biennial

== Publications ==
- Life and Death on the Bluffs, 2014 Green Gallery Press

Review by John Gurda, "A journal, a novel, but mostly a journal: entries cryptic and profound looped to create a fabric with recurring characters and repeated themes, notably the precious eternal interplay between land and life realized in a luminous piece of real estate on Milwaukee's East Side."

- The Last Days of John Budgen Jr., 2010 Green Gallery Press
