= Army Service Uniform =

Military uniform worn by United States Army personnel

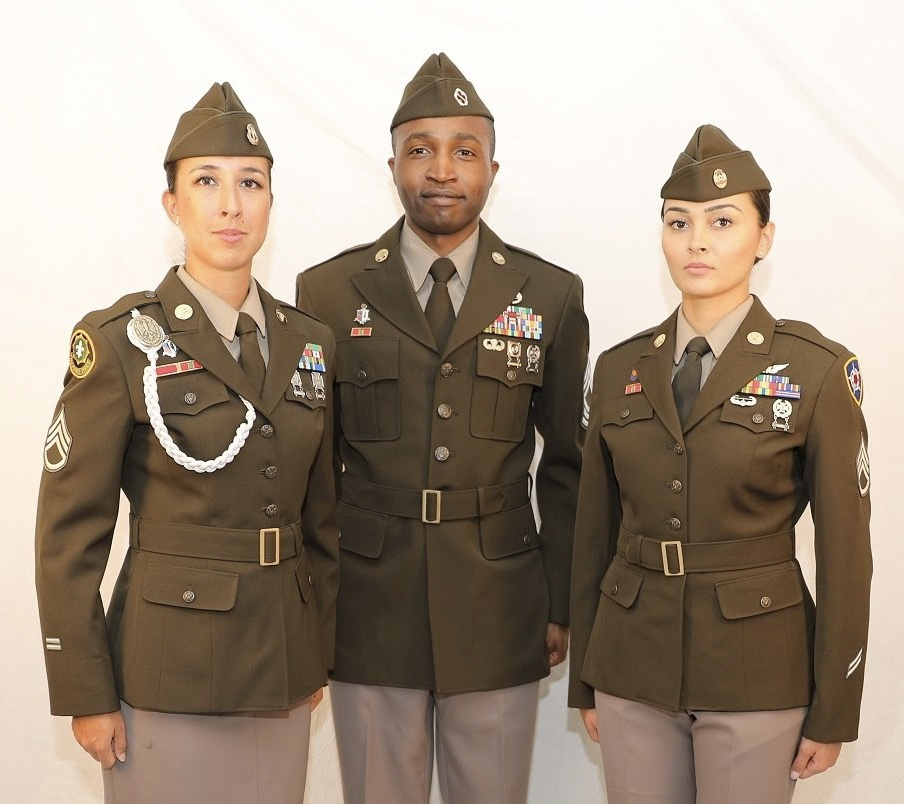
Army Green Service Uniform (AGSU)

The Army Service Uniform (ASU) is a military uniform for wear by United States Army personnel in garrison posts and at most public functions where the Army Combat Uniform is inappropriate. As of 2021, the Army has two service uniforms for use by its personnel. The Army Green Service Uniform, announced in 2018 and authorized in 2020, is used primarily for daily use in situations where civilians wear business attire, such as office settings or official meetings.

The Army Blue Service Uniform, which was the sole service uniform between 2015 and 2020, is used primarily as a dress uniform for ceremonial occasions or formal social situations. Over history, a number of different non-combat service uniforms have been authorized by the Army.

== History ==
In the early days of the U.S. Army, the uniform worn in combat was essentially the same as that worn for everyday duties, as was the common practice with most armies of the time. This changed in modern times, as field uniforms were developed that were more suited for battle.

During the 19th century, Army uniforms were relatively simple. Combat soldiers in the American Civil War wore a standard dark blue coat and light blue trousers, just like personnel in garrisons or in army offices and headquarters. Uniform standards were relaxed during the war years, especially on campaign, as conditions demanded.

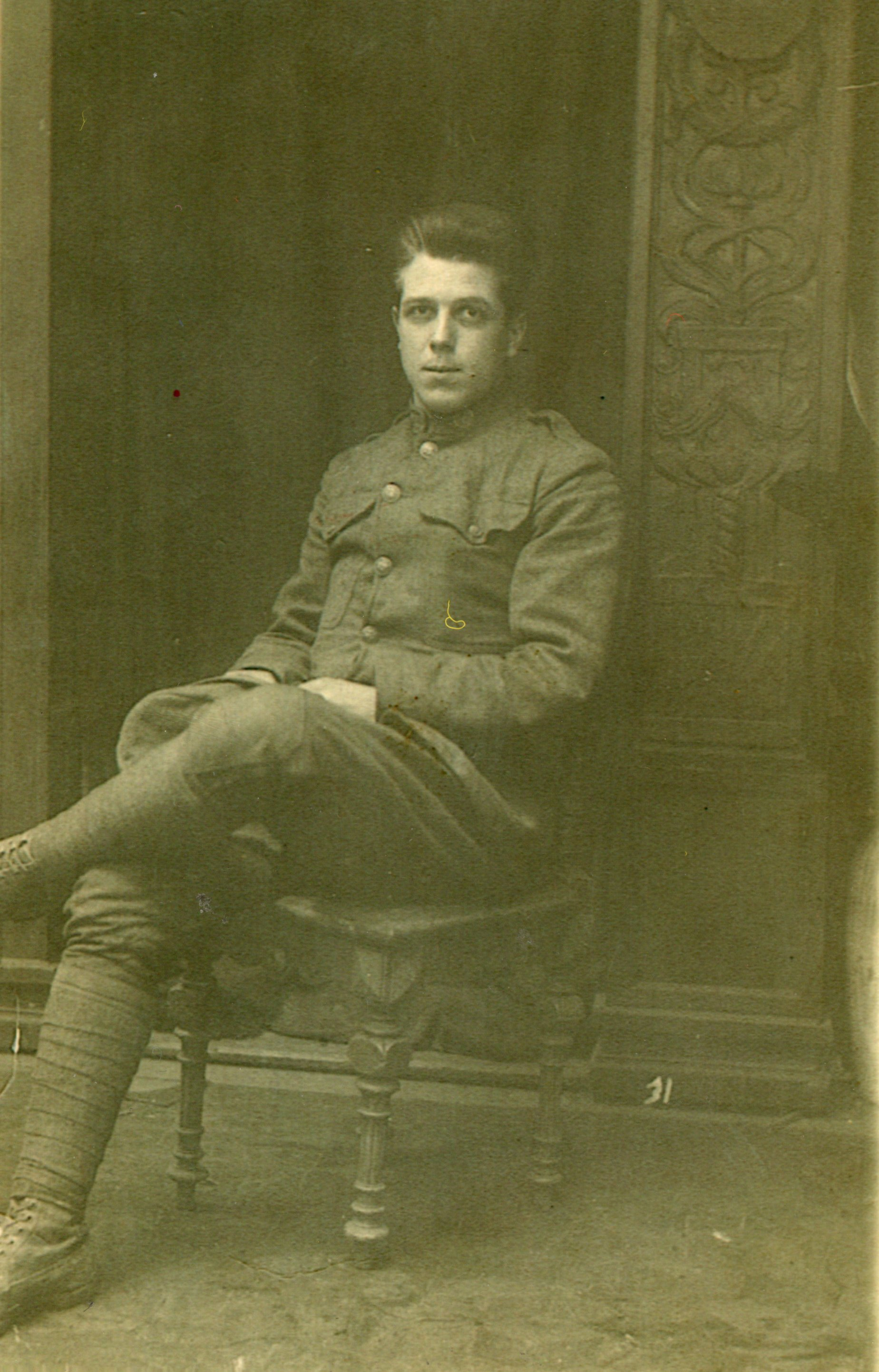
American Expeditionary Force soldier in uniform

The 1899 Army Uniform Regulations provided for a cotton khaki uniform for field service, drawing on the experience of the Spanish–American War when both blue and khaki clothing had been worn. From 1902 to 1917, the army had three uniforms: a service uniform of olive drab wool cloth for use by soldiers in the field, a khaki cotton version used for hot weather, and a blue dress uniform used for ceremonies and off-post wear by enlisted men. The blue uniforms were dropped in 1917 prompted by the exigencies of World War I.

In 1926, the previous stand collar service coat was replaced with an open-collared coat worn with a collared shirt and necktie. In 1937, breeches were replaced with straight-legged trousers. Dress uniforms of dark blue coats and light blue trousers in a modernized form with an open collar, white shirt, and necktie were reintroduced for officers in 1937.

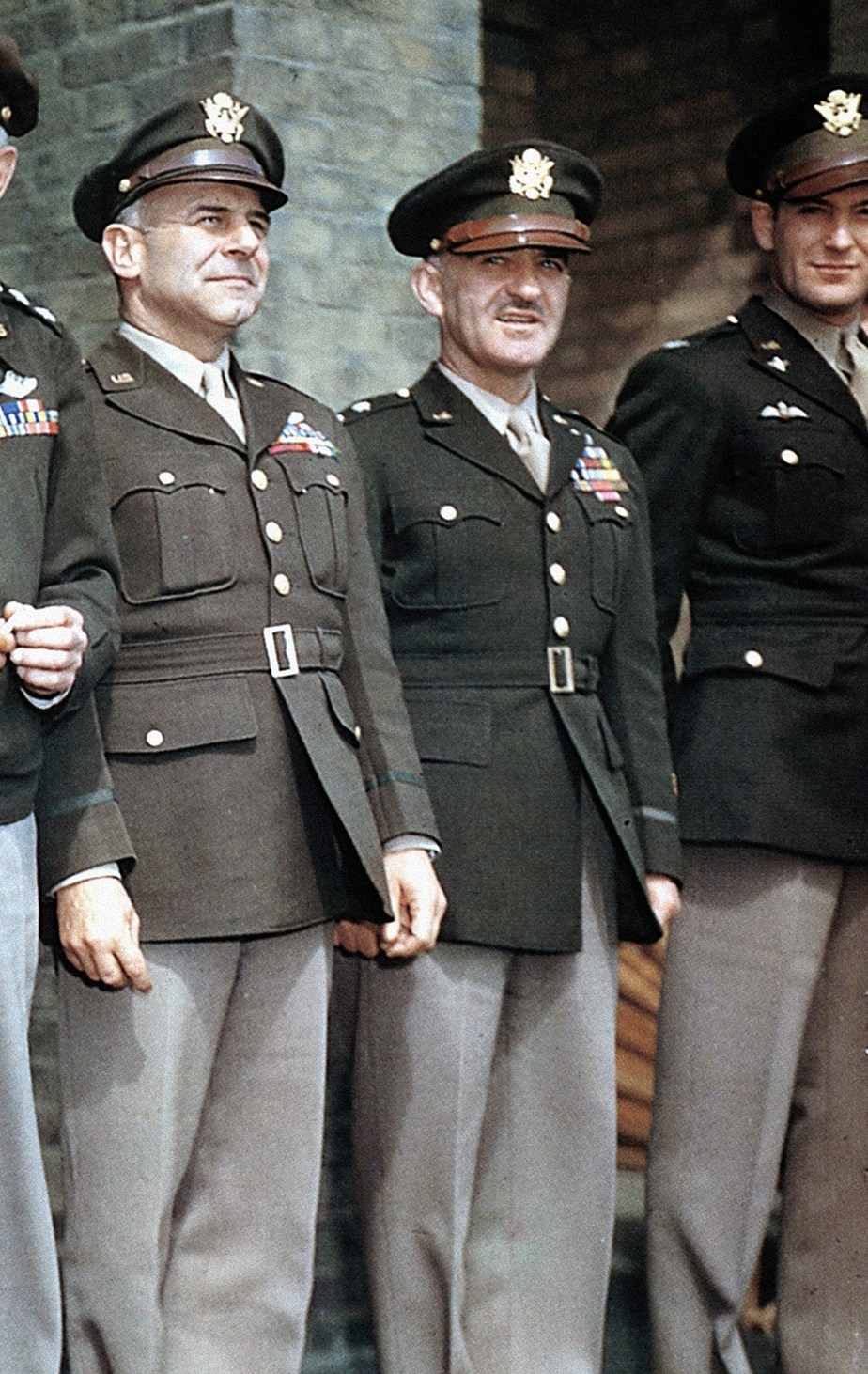
Officers wearing the "pinks and greens" service uniform combination during World War II.

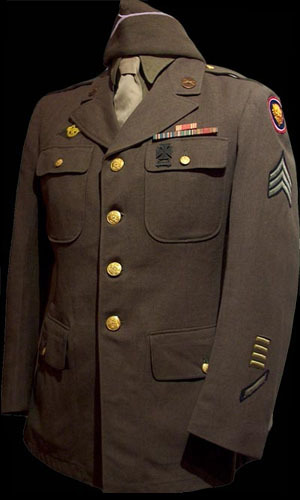
All-purpose service coat issued to enlisted soldiers at the onset of World War II.

United States Army uniforms in World War II initially included service uniforms that were intended for both field and garrison use, though some parts, such as the open-collared service coat, were used only in garrison, while items such as the M1941 field jacket were specifically for use in the field and not meant to be worn in garrison. By the latter part of the war, the introduction of the M1943 field uniform acknowledged the distinction between field and garrison wear.

Garrison uniforms included olive drab uniforms with coat and tie, which were distinct for officers and enlisted soldiers. The officers' version had a darker, belted coat that could be worn with trousers of either matching color or a contrasting light taupe, a combination known as "pinks and greens". The enlisted service coat was unbelted and lighter in shade, and was worn with the issued field uniform trousers. Service coats would be worn with either the respective wool shirt in matching olive drab or the tan shirt from the summer uniform.

A summer service uniform consisting of a khaki cotton shirt and trousers was also issued to enlisted soldiers. Officers' khaki service uniforms could be made from tropical-weight worsted wool instead of cotton and had an optional unbelted khaki service coat, though these were less common as conserving wool for winter uniforms was encouraged. Unlike the winter uniforms, parts of which continued to be widely used as field uniforms, the khaki summer uniforms were quickly relegated only for garrison wear as the herringbone twill utility uniform became the preferred warm-weather field uniform. Late in the war the Eisenhower jacket was introduced, originally intended for both field and garrison wear, though it too became used only for garrison wear shortly after the war. These uniforms remained in use through the Korean War.

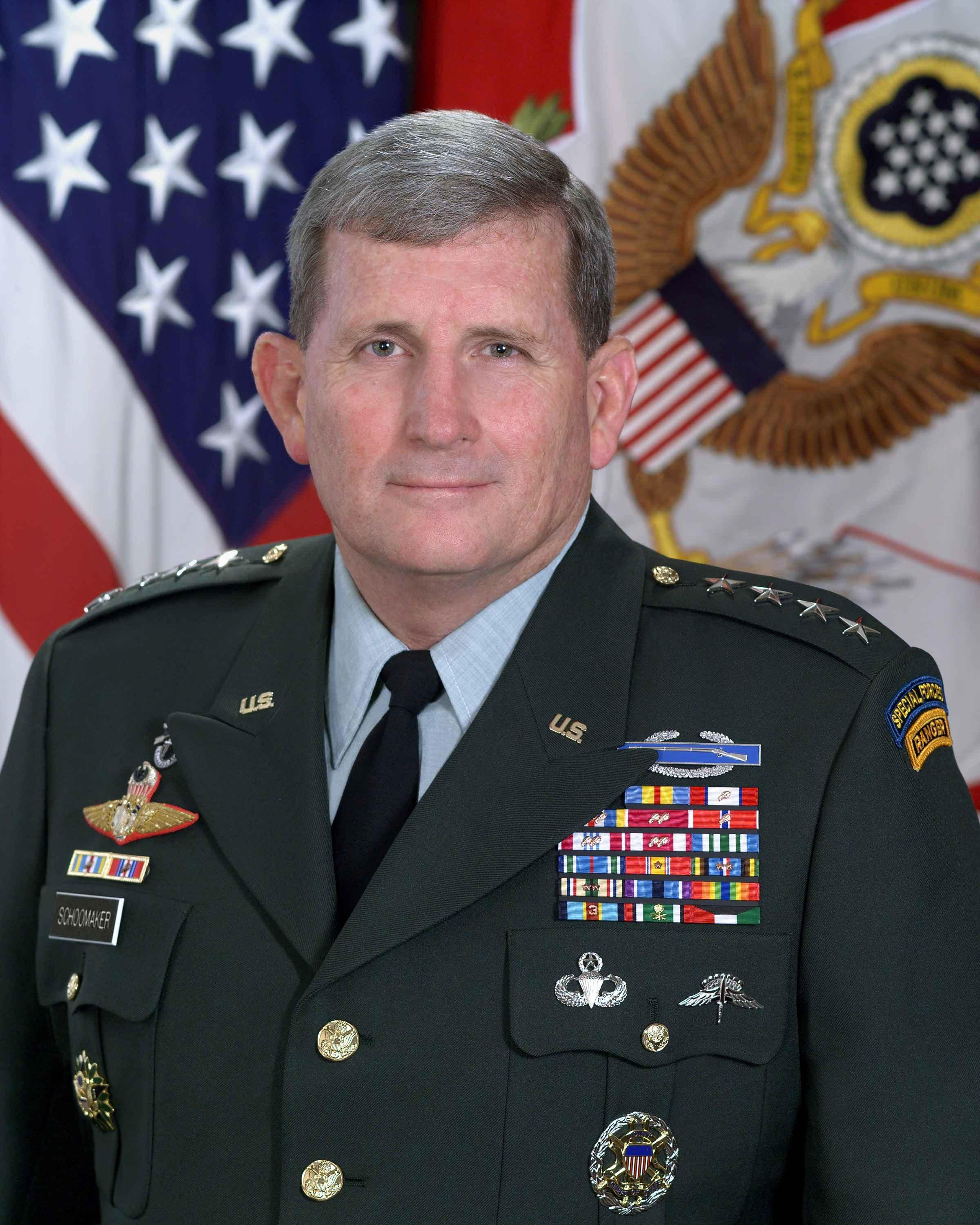
The green "Class A" service uniform, worn by former Army Chief of Staff General Peter Schoomaker.

Because of the widespread use of army surplus clothing after World War II, a fresh, distinct uniform was seen as needed. In 1954, the Army introduced a new, all-ranks "Class A" service uniform in Army Green shade 44. This grey-green shade was adopted in order to provide a color that had a distinct military appearance from various uniforms of civilian service workers. Originally worn with a tan shirt, the shirt was switched to a pale green-grey shade in 1979.

The tan summer service uniform was retained with a matching coat reintroduced, but following the introduction of a tropical weight version of the "Class A" Army Green Shade 344 (AG-344) poly-wool serge blend jacket on 13 July 1964, the tan uniform was relegated to a "Class B" uniform with a short-sleeved shirt and no tie. The tan "Class B" uniform was phased out in the early 1980s when the green uniform with a short-sleeved shirt became the standard Class B uniform.

In the mid 1950s, the blue dress uniform was reintroduced as an option for enlisted soldiers. A white dress uniform for use in tropical areas, last worn in the early 20th century, was reintroduced, but was rarely used, as it was only required for officers. It was retired in 2014.

In 2006, Army Chief of Staff General Peter Schoomaker announced that a version of the dress blue uniform would be adopted as the sole service uniform for all ranks, combining ceremonial, dress, and service uniforms through wear stipulations to reduce the number of uniforms needed. The blue Army Service Uniform made its debut at the 2007 State of the Union Address, when Schoomaker attended the address in it. In 2010, it started being issued to all soldiers. Possession and use of the blue ASU became mandatory for all soldiers in October 2015, when the green Class A uniform was fully retired.

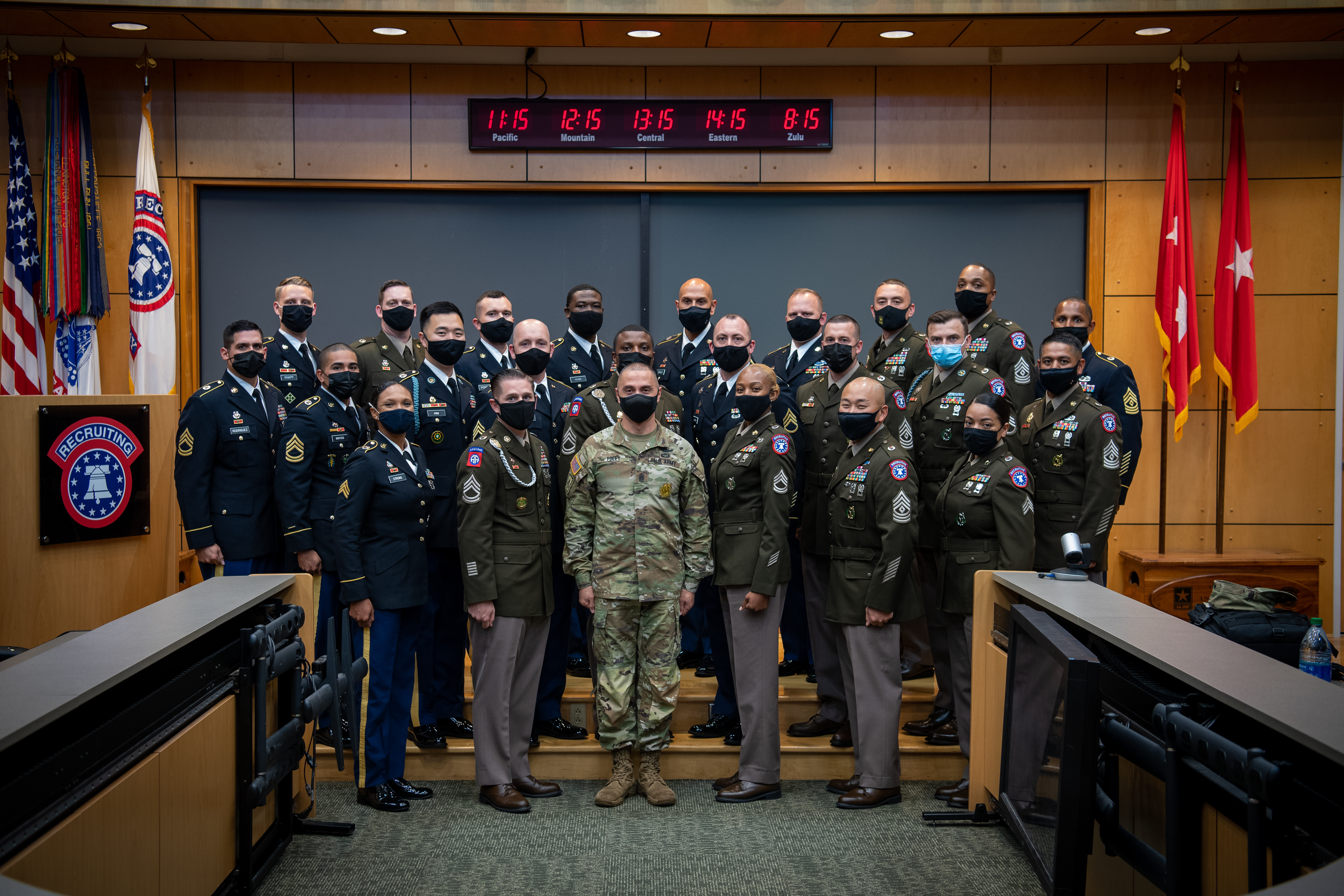
Attendees at a conference of Army recruiters wearing both the blue and green service uniforms

On Veterans Day 2018, the Army announced that a new Army Green Service Uniform, based on the "pinks and greens" officers' service uniform worn in World War II and the Korean War, would be introduced as the everyday service uniform for all ranks starting in 2020. The uniform became available to soldiers in mid-2020. By early 2021, the uniform became available for purchase at all Army and Air Force Exchange Service locations, with soldiers required to purchase them by October 1, 2027. The Army Blue Service Uniform returns to its former use as a formal dress uniform.

== Current versions ==
=== Army Green Service Uniform ===
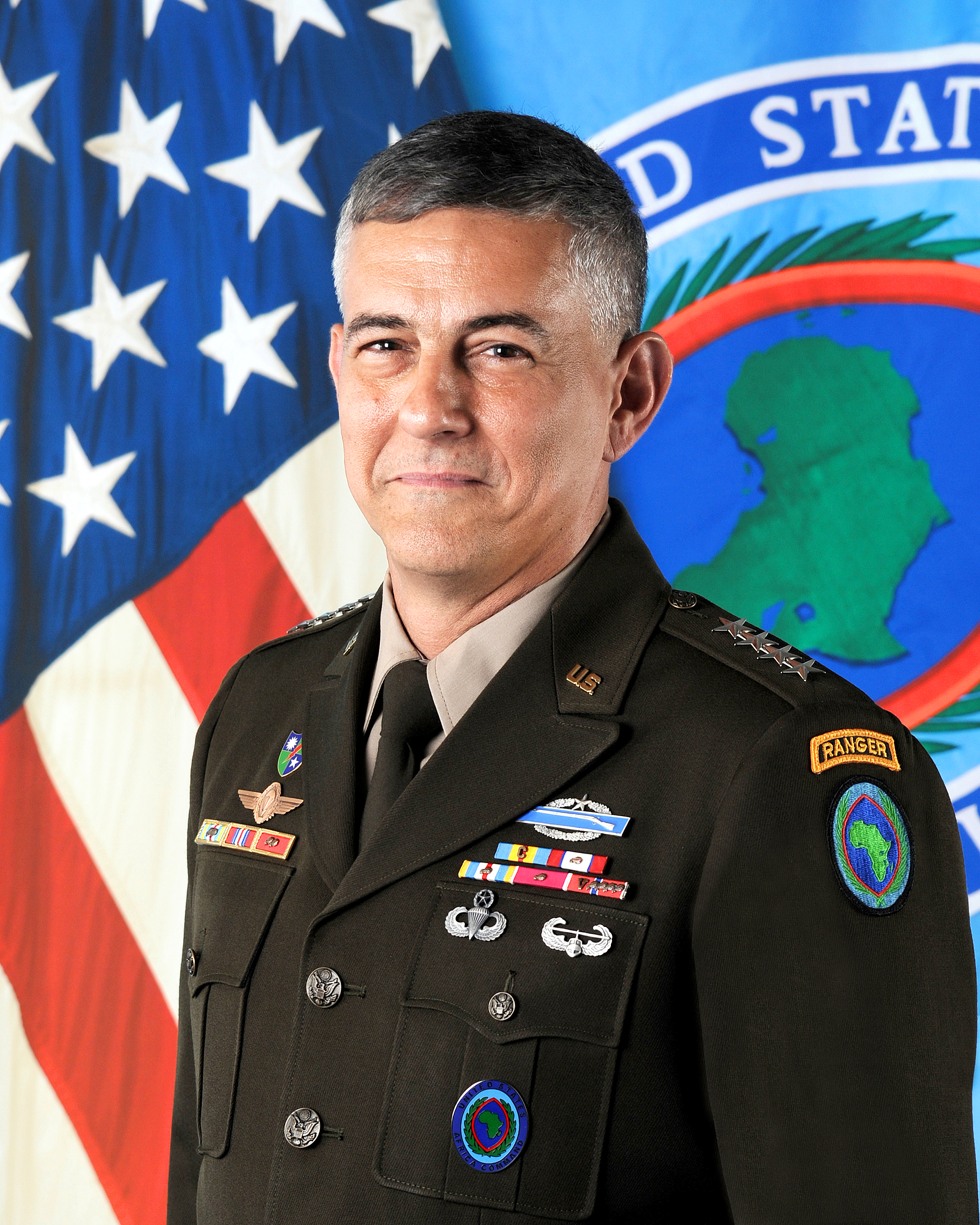
The Army Green Service Uniform, as worn by General Stephen J. Townsend

The Army Green Service Uniform includes a dark olive drab four-pocket coat with belted waist, taupe trousers or slacks, tan shirt, olive tie, and brown leather oxfords for both men and women. Women have the option to wear a pencil skirt and pumps instead. Headwear consists of an olive garrison cap or an olive peaked service cap with brown visor; units with distinctive colored berets continue to wear them. An olive trench coat is the standard all-weather overcoat with the uniform. Enlisted rank is indicated by chevrons worn on the upper sleeve. Officer rank is indicated by pins on the shoulder straps.

In class B configuration, the service coat is omitted, and the necktie is optional if a short-sleeved shirt is worn. An olive pullover sweater is authorized with the class B uniform, while optional jackets include an olive zip-front windbreaker, an olive Eisenhower jacket, and a brown leather bomber jacket.

=== Army Blue Service Uniform ===
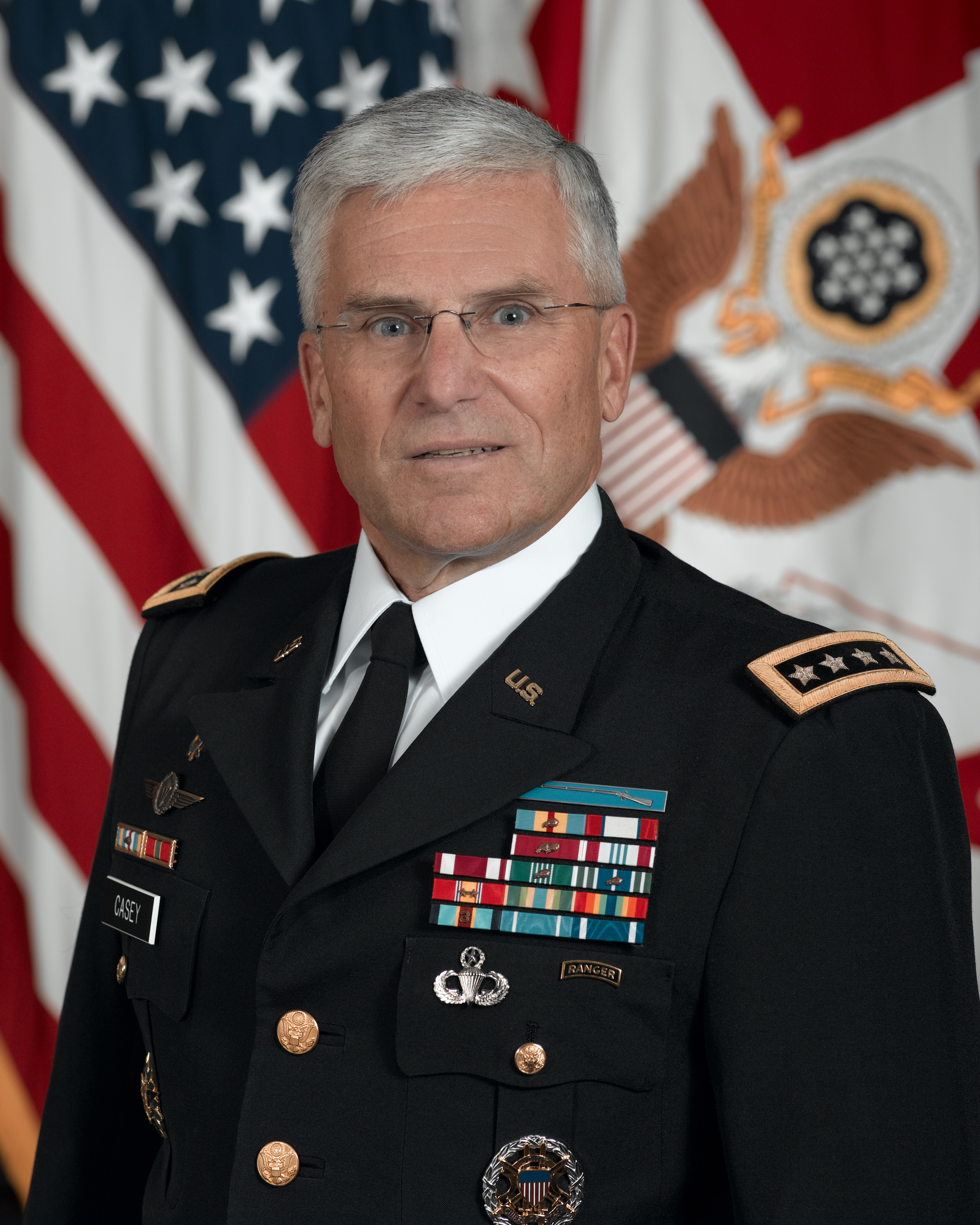
The Army Blue Service Uniform for officers, as worn by General George W. Casey Jr.

The Army Blue Service Uniform includes a midnight blue coat worn with lighter blue trousers for male soldiers and a midnight blue coat worn with either lighter blue slacks or midnight blue skirt for female soldiers. The trousers/slacks for non-commissioned and commissioned officers include a stripe of gold braid on the outer side of the leg. Generals wear midnight blue trousers/slacks with gold braid instead of the lighter blue used in lower ranks.

The blue service uniform is worn with a white shirt, a black four-in-hand necktie for males or black neck tab for females, and black leather shoes. Headwear includes a matching service cap with branch-of-service colors on the hat band or a beret, with black remaining the default color unless the soldier is authorized a distinctive colored beret. Enlisted rank is also indicated by chevrons on the upper sleeve, while officer rank is indicated by passant shoulder straps with branch-of-service color backing.

Combat boots and organizational items, such as brassards, military police accessories, or distinctive unit insignia, are not worn when used as ceremonial dress. When the blue uniform is worn for social events in the evening, men may wear a black bow tie rather than a black four-in-hand necktie, and commanders may direct that headwear is not required.

== See also ==
- Uniforms of the United States Army
