= Los Angeles Urban Rangers =

American artist collective

The Los Angeles Urban Rangers is a group of American scholars and artists who interpret domestic and international urban landscapes using the perspective of the United States National Park Service. Founded in 2003, they are best known for their Malibu Public Beach Safari, an urban safari tour of the affluent Malibu beach area of Los Angeles. In 2011 the group also led tours of the LA river.

The Urban Rangers' Portable Ranger Station was shown at the 2009 International Architecture Biennale Rotterdam in the Netherlands Architecture Institute. Their work was included in "Actions: What You Can Do With The City", at The Graham Foundation in Chicago, and in the Experimental Geography on the road show. In 2009 the Urban Rangers received a 2009 Emerging Artist Fellowship award from the CA Community Foundation in conjunction with the Getty Trust.
