= Donna Stonecipher =

American poet

- Education: Iowa Writers' Workshop (MFA); University of Georgia (PhD)
- Occupation: Poet

Donna Stonecipher is an American poet.

== Life ==
She grew up in Seattle and Tehran, and lived in Prague from 1994 to 1998. She graduated from the University of Iowa Writers' Workshop, with an MFA in 2001. She completed her PhD in English and Creative Writing at the University of Georgia.

She has published five books of poetry and one of prose, as well as several translations. Her poems have appeared in Paris Review, Denver Quarterly, the Indiana Review, New American Writing, SAND Journal and Conjunctions.

She translates from French and German. Her translations have appeared in Circumference, Action Yes, and chicagopostmodernpoetry.

The New York Times named her 2018 collection Transaction Histories one of the 10 best poetry books of the year.

In 2020, her book Model City sold hundreds of copies after an enthusiastic review in Frank Skinner's Poetry Podcast. A bilingual version, translated in French by Jérémy Victor Robert, was published in February 2021.

Her 2023 collection The Ruins of Nostalgia was listed by NPR as a best book of the year in their "Books We Love" feature.

She lives in Berlin, Germany.

== Awards, Distinctions ==
- 2023 NPR Best Books of 2023, "Books We Love"
- 2018 New York Times 10 Best Poetry Collections 2018
- 2015 NEA Translation Grant
- 2007 National Poetry Series
- 2002 Contemporary Poetry Series

== Works ==
=== Collections ===
- The Reservoir. University of Georgia Press. 2002. ISBN 978-0-8203-2463-0.
- Souvenir de Constantinople. Instance Press. 2007. ISBN 978-0-9679854-5-9.
- The Cosmopolitan. Coffee House Press. 2008. ISBN 978-1-56689-221-6.
- Model City. Shearsman. 2015. ISBN 978-1-84861-388-1.
- Transaction Histories. University of Iowa Press. 2018. ISBN 978-1-60938-602-3.
- Cité modèle (in French and English). Translated by Jérémy Victor Robert. joca seria. 2021. ISBN 978-2-84809-346-8.
- The Ruins of Nostalgia. Wesleyan University Press. 2023. ISBN 978-0-81950-084-7.

=== Poems ===
- "Inlay (Kafka)", Gut Cult Issue 7
- "White Mouth", Conjunctions
- "Model City", Paris Review

=== Translations ===
- Friederike Mayröcker (2024). cahier. Seagull Press. ISBN 978-1-803093260.
- Friederike Mayröcker (2020). études. Seagull Press. ISBN 978-0-857426567.
- Ludwig Hohl (2012). Ascent. Black Square Editions. ISBN 978-0986005015.
- "My Private Leningrad", No Man's Land, Andrej Glusgold
- "Landscape", No Man's Land, Andrej Glusgold
- Wayne Miller; Kevin Prufer, eds. (2008). New European poets. Graywolf Press. ISBN 978-1-55597-492-3.

=== Criticism ===
- Prose Poetry and the City. Parlor Press. 2018. ISBN 978-1602359994.
- "On Cole Swensen’s Ours", Jacket 26, 2008

=== Anthologies ===
- H.L. Hix, ed. (2008). New Voices: Contemporary Poetry from the United States. Irish Pages. ISBN 978-0-9544257-9-1.
