= Field jacket =

Field jacket can refer to any one of several US Military jackets:

- M-1941 field jacket, worn from 1941 till 1943
- M-1943 field jacket, worn from 1943 till 1951
- M-1951 field jacket, worn from 1951 till 1965
- M-1965 field jacket, worn from 1965 till 2009
