= List of equipment uniforms of the Philippine Commonwealth Army =

The list of all various military uniforms by used of the Philippine Commonwealth Army during the Second World War.

== Army and military service uniforms ==
=== Military headgear ===
Military cap

- (United States) peaked cap (1935–1946)
- (United States) garrison cap (1935–1946)
- (United States) overseas cap (1935–1946)

== Army and military combat uniforms ==
=== Military headgear ===
Military helmets

- (United States) (United Kingdom) Brodie helmet (in US M1917 helmet) (1935–1946)
- (United States) M1 helmet (1942–1946)
- (United States) American M1938 tanker helmet (1942–1946)

Military lightweight cloth-covered helmet

- (Commonwealth of the Philippines) Guinit sun helmets (1935–1942)
- (United States) sun helmet (1935–1946)

Military garrison caps

- (United States) garrison cap (1935–1946)
- (United States) overseas cap (1935–1946)

Military caps, hats, and hood

- (United States) M1941 American field cap (1942–1946)
- (United States) American HBT cap (1942–1946)
- (United States) American tanker hood (1942–1946)
- (United States) American jeep cap (1942–1946)
- (United States) M1940 blue denim work hat (1940–1942)

=== Military coats/jackets/shirts ===
Military coat

- (United States) M1940 blue denim work coat (1935–1942)

Military jackets

- (United States) M1940 blue denim work uniform/jacket (1940–1942)
- (United States) U.S. Army M-1943 uniform/Jacket (1943–1946)
- (United States) M-1938 field jacket (1938–1946)
- (United States) M-1941 field jacket (1941–1946)
- (United States) American tanker jacket (1942–1946)
- (United States) American HBT jacket (1942–1946)

Military shirts

- (United States) American khaki cotton summer uniform/shirt (1935–1942)
- (United Kingdom) British khaki drill uniform/shirt (1935–1942)
- (United States) American mustard wool uniform/shirt (1942–1946)
- (United States) American M-1937 wool shirt (1942–1946)
- (United States) American M-1937 OD wool shirt (1942–1946)

=== Military trousers/shorts ===
Military trousers

- (United States) American khaki cotton summer uniform/trousers (1935–1942)
- (United States) M1940 blue denim work uniform/trousers (1935–1942)
- (United States) American mustard wool uniform/trousers (1942–1946)
- (United States) U.S. Army M-1943 uniform/trousers (1943–1946)
- (United States) American M-1937 woolen trousers (1942–1946)
- (United States) American M-1937 OD wool trousers (1942–1946)
- (United States) American HBT trousers (1942–1946)

Military shorts

- (United Kingdom) British khaki drill uniform/shorts (1935–1942)

=== Military tanker overalls and trousers ===
Military overalls

- (United States) American HBT overalls (1942–1946)

Military tanker trousers

- (United States) American tanker trousers (1935–1946)

=== Military footwear ===
Military leggings

- (United States) M-1938 leggings (1938–1946)

Military shoes

- (United States) Type 1 service shoe (1935–1946)
- (United States) Type 2 service shoe (1935–1946)

Military boots

- (United States) American two-buckle boots (1942–1946)
- (United States) M-1944 combat boot (1944–1946)
