= U.S. Army M1943 uniform =

U.S. Army combat uniform

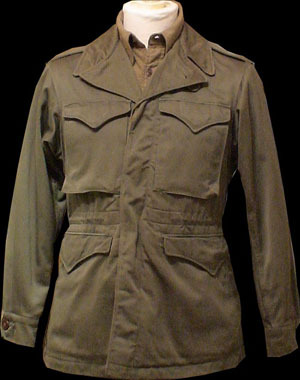
M-43 field jacket

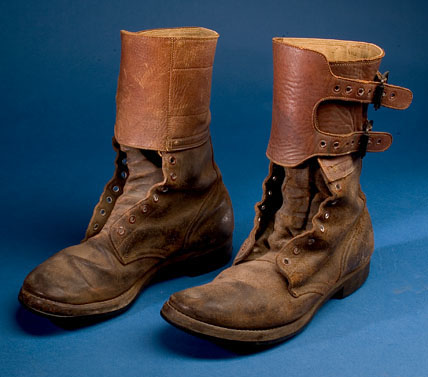
M-1943 Combat Service Boots

The U.S. Army's M1943 uniform was a combat uniform manufactured in windproof cotton sateen cloth introduced in 1943 to replace a variety of other specialist uniforms and some inadequate garments, such as the M1941 field jacket. It was used through the remainder of World War II and into the Korean War with modifications before being replaced by the OG-107 uniform beginning in 1952.

== Pre-1943 ==
By 1941, soldiers wore an olive drab wool flannel shirt and wool serge trousers in winter and a cotton khaki shirt and trousers in summer, both worn with ankle-high russet brown leather service shoes and light OD canvas leggings. The winter uniform was often worn with the light olive drab shade no. 3 (OD3) cotton M1941 field jacket.

A two-piece light sage green herringbone twill (HBT) utility uniform, which replaced a previous blue denim one, also saw use in combat, especially in tropical environments where the wool uniforms were too heavy. Armored units still used wool riding breeches and wore high-lacing boots in some cases, and paratroopers were forced to use a general-issue HBT coverall with no real suitable footwear.

As a result of this lack of proper and suitable clothing, the armored units were issued general infantry uniforms, although by 1942 winter coveralls and winter "tanker" jacket had been produced with them in mind. These articles of clothing were made of OD3 cotton lined with wool kersey.

Paratroopers also received their own unique uniform in 1942, the M-1942 Paratrooper uniform. It was constructed of OD3 cotton twill, with four front pockets and two pant-leg cargo pockets. They also were issued a new boot design of their own, of similar construction to the infantry shoe, only being mid-shin high and laced all the way up, known as jump boots.

There were many issues with these uniforms. The OD3 shade was found to be too lightly colored to provide adequate concealment in European woodlands. The combat wool, khaki, and paratrooper trousers all did not have adequate locking stitches in the crotch resulting in frequent tears at that stress point. Paratrooper uniforms also often tore at the knees and elbows; they were often reinforced with canvas patches added by soldiers. The infantry uniform was lacking in functionality compared to the paratrooper uniform, and the tanker winter uniforms were sought after by almost every branch in the Army, making supply and production often difficult. Generally, these uniforms were seen as inadequate, and the Army sought to standardize a better uniform.

== Initial design ==
The most recognizable part of the uniform is the standardized field jacket. It was longer than the M1941 jacket, coming down to the upper thighs, had a detachable hood, drawstring waist, two large breast pockets and two skirt pockets. It was colored olive drab shade no. 7 (OD7), a darker and greener shade than the previous field jacket.

The trousers were made out of the same cotton sateen material. They were made similarly to the khaki trousers, but featured a looser fit for mobility and durability, and included button tabs at the waist in order to cinch the waist in.

The herringbone twill fatigue uniform was also changed to OD7, with the trousers redesigned to have two large cargo pockets on the side. The latter was done as eliminating the previous side and back pockets saved costs and time in manufacture. These items were designed to be layered either under the M1943 winter uniform or alone as a warm-weather garment.

To replace the separate canvas leggings, new M-1943 Combat Service Boots included an integrated leather cuff that was fastened by two buckles.

The uniform was designed to be warm in winter by use of separate liners for the jackets and trousers, both made of faux fur "pile". The trouser pile liners were dropped from the final system in favor of the previous wool trousers. The jacket liner was a separate cotton-shell jacket with two slash pockets and button and loop fasteners, but it was rarely issued in practice during World War II as it was intended to be replaced by the M-1944 Eisenhower jacket, though that was made a garrison-only item before the Korean War.

== Wartime use ==
The uniform was tested in Italy in 1943 by the 45th Infantry Division and the 3rd Infantry Division but some GIs (including Technician Third Grade Bill Mauldin) claim that non-combatant officers and enlisted personnel would use their position in the rear to get the new uniform, delaying the ultimate field testing in Italy for some time longer. This, along with shipping delays after D-Day kept this uniform from widespread use in Europe until late 1944. After D-Day, Paratroopers were issued complete M1943 uniforms, and infantry units began getting the uniform parts here and there.

Paratroopers were generally the only ones to modify the uniform, as they would sometimes add their own trouser cargo pockets. They kept their older "Corcoran" paratrooper boots instead of the new M43 buckle boots because they were less likely to snag on their parachute when it deployed.

The cotton sateen trousers were modified in 1944 with the addition of trouser cuff tabs and again in a 1945 pattern with minor cut modifications and a move from stud to plastic buttons.

== Postwar impact ==
A new uniform, known as the OG-107 fatigue uniform, was first introduced in 1952. By the beginning of the Vietnam War, it had completely replaced the M-1943 uniform as the standard in the Army.

The 1943 pattern jacket was issued to soldiers all the way through the Korean War but was superseded by the 1950 pattern which changed to a button-in liner, then further modified as the 1951 pattern which added bi-swing shoulder pleats, and the use of zippers and snap fastener. The latest version of the jacket, the M-1965 field jacket, is still in service, though now made of a tougher cotton/nylon blend with polyester fill in the liner, and comes in the modern Army Operational Camouflage Pattern. It is no longer used for combat operations having been superseded by the Gen II and Gen III Gore-Tex parkas.

The French military copied this jacket, with some minor differences, as part of the Tenue Toutes Armes Modèle 47 uniform, with modifications in the 47/52 jacket. These differences include a lack of a button-in hood or liner. There was also a "mountain" version with said hood, and a light climate version without hip pockets. The normal and light jackets were also issued in camouflage, mainly for use in the Algerian War. This jacket was superseded by the "Satin 300" or Modèle 64 uniform, first issued in 1964.

The Norwegian military also copied the jacket post-war, with it first being issued in olive drab, later in the M/75 camouflage pattern. It was used up until its replacement by the M/98 jacket, which was more similar in cut to the American Battle Dress Uniform, in the late 1990s.

The Greek military's version of the M1943 came in multiple variants - examples exist with and without buttons to attach a hood, with a zipper or button closure, and both fur and quilted nylon liners. It was most likely replaced at some point in the 1970s.

== See also ==
- Uniforms of the United States Army
- M-1951 field jacket
- M-1965 field jacket
- United States Army uniforms in World War II
