= Eisenhower jacket =

Type of waist-length jacket

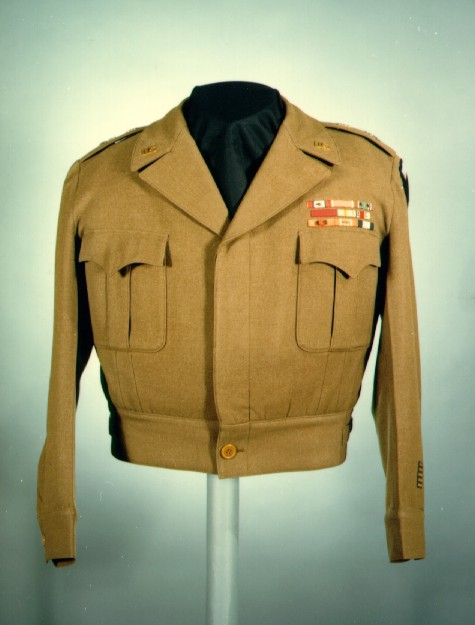
WWII-era Eisenhower jacket worn by Dwight Eisenhower

The Eisenhower jacket or "Ike" jacket, officially known as the M-1944 Jacket, Field, Wool, Olive Drab, is a type of waist-length jacket developed for the U.S. Army during the later stages of World War II and named after Dwight D. Eisenhower. Intended to be worn on its own or as an insulating layer beneath the M-1943 field jacket and over the standard wool flannel shirt and wool sweater, it featured a pleated back, adjustable waist band, fly-front buttons, bellows chest pockets, slash side pockets, and shoulder straps.

== Background ==
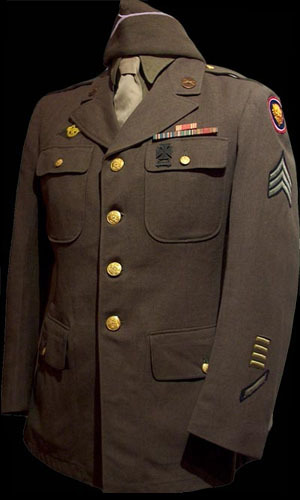
All-purpose service coat issued to enlisted soldiers at the onset of World War II

Until the late 1930s, the United States Army’s field uniform consisted of a wool flannel shirt and trousers, a mid-hip-length service coat also used as a dress coat, and a wool overcoat. Save for its waist that featured a leather waist belt for enlisted men or a Sam Browne belt for officers, the single-breasted service coat resembled a suit or sport coat of the time; little about the design changed since the mid-1920s; it featured notched lapels and four brass buttons from its open collar to its belted waist. Made of wool fabric, it touted two flapped and button-through patch pockets at the breast and two identically-styled patch pockets below its waist – its four pockets either box-pleated or bellows-styled-pleats.

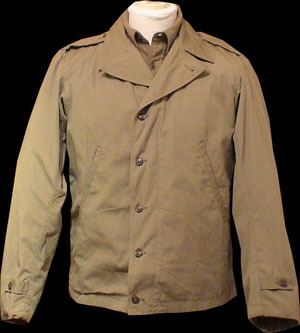
Olive drab "Parsons Jacket"

Finding the service coat to be impractical for field use, the Army began a four-year study in 1935 to develop a more practical and effective combat jacket to replace the service coat. The service coat was eventually relegated to garrison and parade duty, and was simplified to eliminate the belt entirely in the case of enlisted men, or replace it with a matching cloth belt for officers.

In 1940, the Army adopted the first-pattern field jacket, the Jacket, Field, Olive Drab, or "Parsons jacket", named for Major General James K. Parsons who helped with its development. This was quickly followed by an updated pattern, using the same nomenclature. Simply designed and modeled after a civilian windbreaker made by John Rissman & Sons of Chicago, it was a short, button-front weatherproof jacket with a tight fitting waist and two flapped and button-through front pockets.

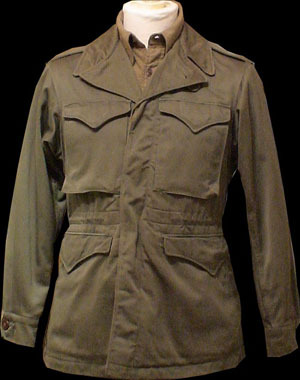
M-1943 field jacket

By 1943, front-line skirmishes in North Africa and Europe proved the Parsons jacket insufficient and it was replaced by a completely redesigned field jacket. Built around the layering principle, the M-1943 became the basic building block of a multi-environment, all-season combat uniform being developed by the Office of the Quartermaster General (OQMG) for worldwide combat. The Air Transport Command (ATC) recommended development of a waist-length wool field jacket that could be worn under the M-1943 jacket as an added insulating layer. During autumn 1943, the Army Air Corps' prototype jacket was sent to Chief Quartermaster of the European Theater of Operations for review and possible adoption by ETO commanding general, Dwight D. Eisenhower.

Eisenhower had already requested a waist-cropped style stemming from his appreciation of the functionality of the British Battledress jacket. According to Carlo D'Este, citing an eyewitness account by James Parton, while visiting the VII Bomber Command in England in 1942, Eisenhower openly admired a uniform jacket worn by Major General Ira C. Eaker. Eaker's jacket had been specially made by a London tailor, modeled after the standard dress of the British armed forces. He gave Eisenhower the jacket, which fit Eisenhower. Thereafter Eisenhower had similar jackets made in the same style. D’Este credits Eaker for actually creating the Eisenhower jacket.

== Design and construction ==
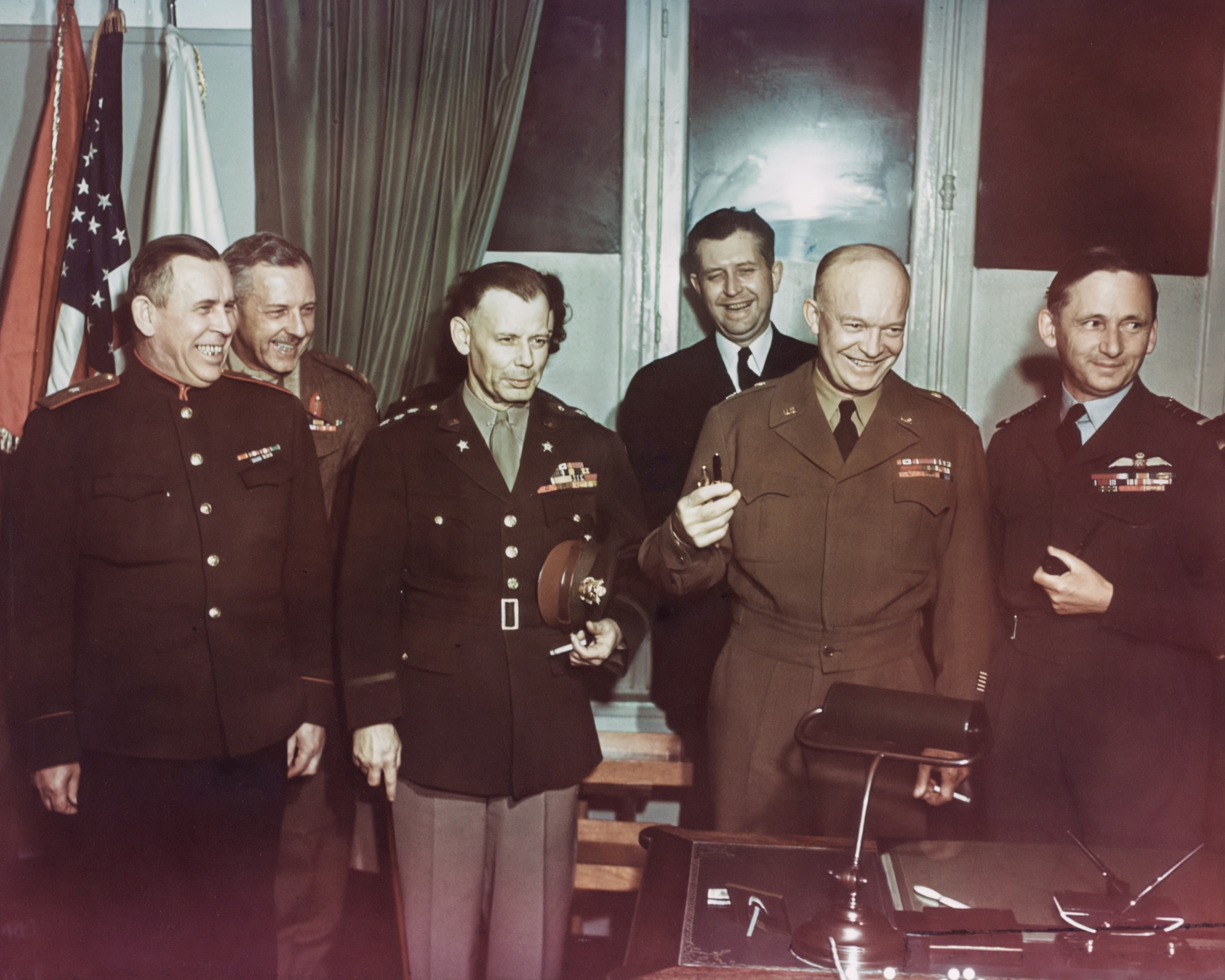
Eisenhower, wearing his M44 jacket, with some Allied commanders following the signing of the German Instrument of Surrender at Reims

The jacket that emerged was waist-length, and made of 18-ounce olive drab wool serge. It featured notched lapels, a closable "storm collar", snag-free fly front buttons and flapped, bellows breast pockets, shoulder straps for gear retention, and roomy sleeves to accommodate insulating layers.

Staggered cuff buttons adjusted for layering or allowed a loose fit in warmer conditions, as did adjustable waist buckles. A pair of "action-back" pleats extended from shoulder to waistband, providing freedom of movement with a slim fit. Intended to be worn on its own or underneath the M-1943 jacket, the "Ike jacket", was classified standard issue in November 1944, and additionally designated as the Army’s dress and parade uniform.

According to Paul Fussell’s Uniforms, "Eisenhower had a reputation among his troops as an eminently decent man, friendly and sympathetic", an admiration that Ike elevated even further, tells Fussell, by having the bravado to casually rest his hands inside his pocket and "violate the sacred Army injunction." That anecdote, Fussell says, explains why Eisenhower refused to adorn his personal jacket with gilded buttons: He considered his jacket an every-warrior’s combat uniform. Eisenhower died in 1969 and was buried dressed in his famous short green jacket.

== US Marine Corps and the "Vandegrift jacket" ==
Following the Guadalcanal Campaign, the 1st Marine Division under Major General Alexander Vandegrift were posted to the cooler climate of Melbourne, Australia. As the Marines had only their utility and tan summer uniforms, they were issued Australian army battle dress with the Marines calling the short jacket the "Vandegrift jacket". An American-made, forest green version was issued to officers in December 1944 and to enlisted Marines in August 1945.

== Post–World War II redesigns and adaptations ==
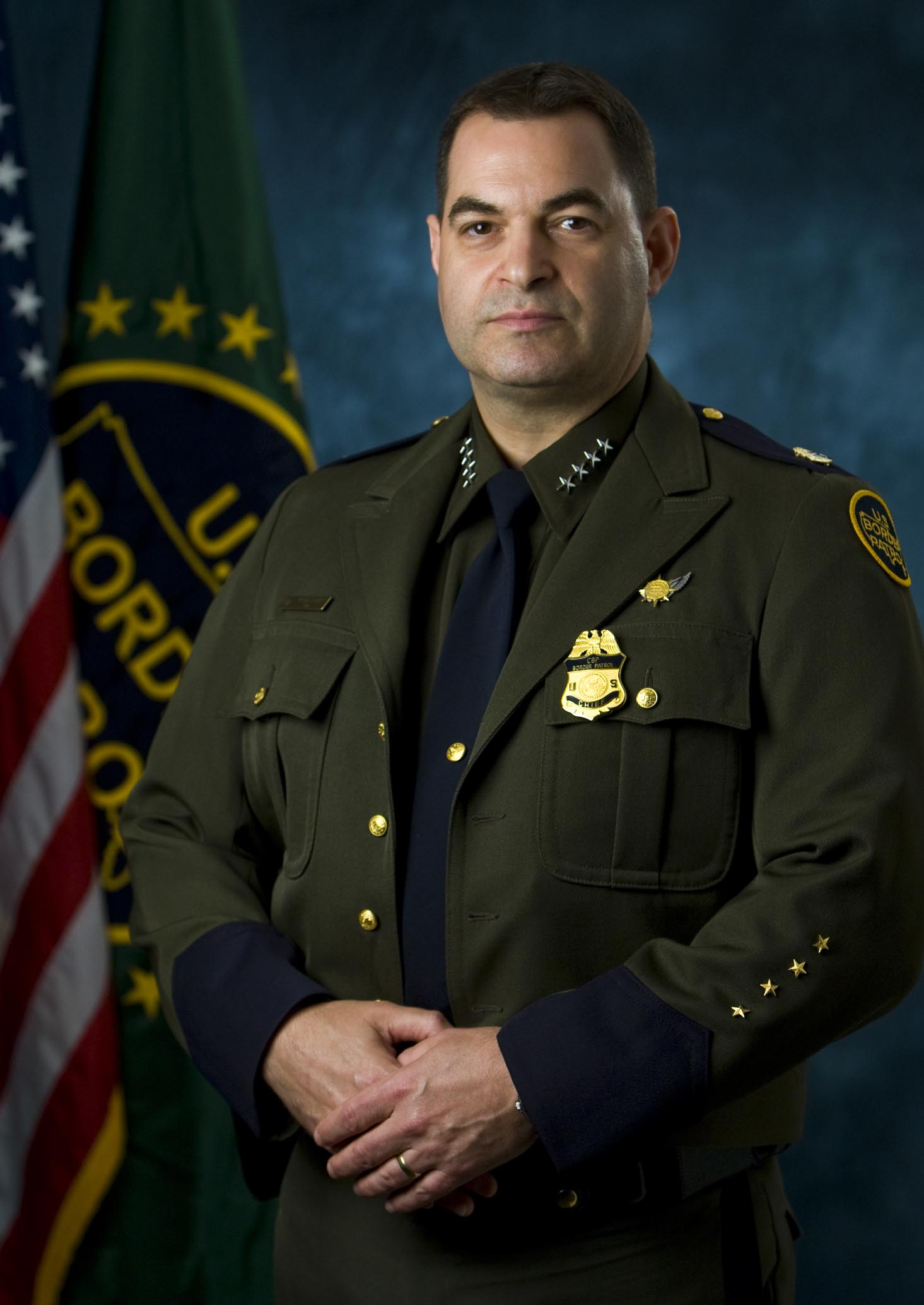
Former Chief of the U.S. Border Patrol Michael J. Fisher wearing the Border Patrol's version of the Ike jacket with peaked lapel

In 1947, the Army introduced a more closely tailored version of the Eisenhower jacket which was designated solely as a dress and parade uniform; the jacket was again modified in 1950 without button cuffs. With the later introduction of the Army Green "Class-A" service uniform in 1957, the Ike jacket gradually began to disappear domestically but was still a uniform option for troops stationed in international theaters, but not in formation.

In 1949, the United States Air Force (USAF), which had been spun off as a separate service in 1947, included an Eisenhower jacket in its new "Air Force blue" uniform color; it remained in use by the USAF until being retired in 1964.

Thanks to its greater comfort and the unobstructed ease it offered while operating a vehicle or carrying a sidearm, the Ike jacket design became a popular post-WWII uniform staple among federal, state, and local law enforcement agencies throughout the United States. Uniforms of the U.S. Border Patrol, the broader U.S. Customs and Border Protection, and the National Park Service use dress jackets that are based on the Eisenhower jacket.

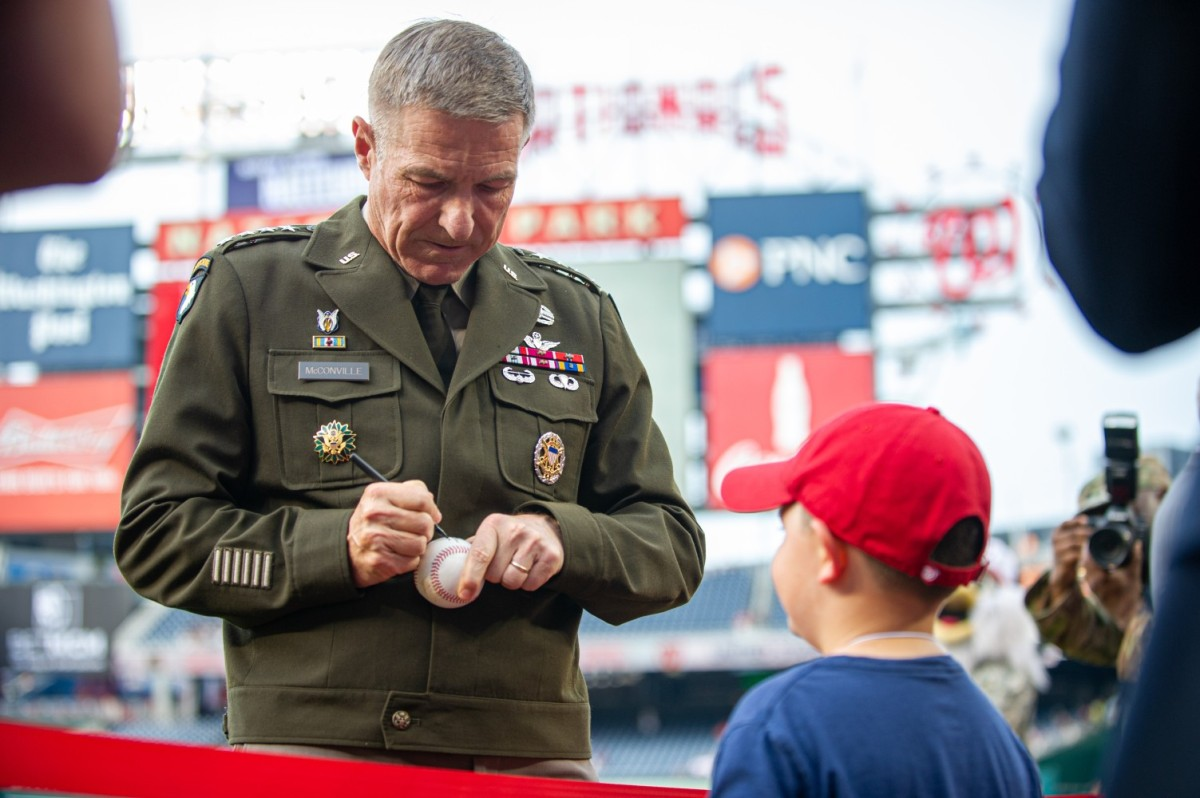
US Army Chief of Staff General James C. McConville wearing an Eisenhower jacket at a public event in 2022

The new Army Green Service Uniform, announced in 2018 and made available in 2020, allows for the wear of an Eisenhower jacket as an optional item when the service coat is not worn.

== See also ==
- British Battledress jacket
- M42 jacket – used by US paratroopers
- Flight jacket
- Shell jacket
