= M-1965 field jacket =

American cold-weather military jacket

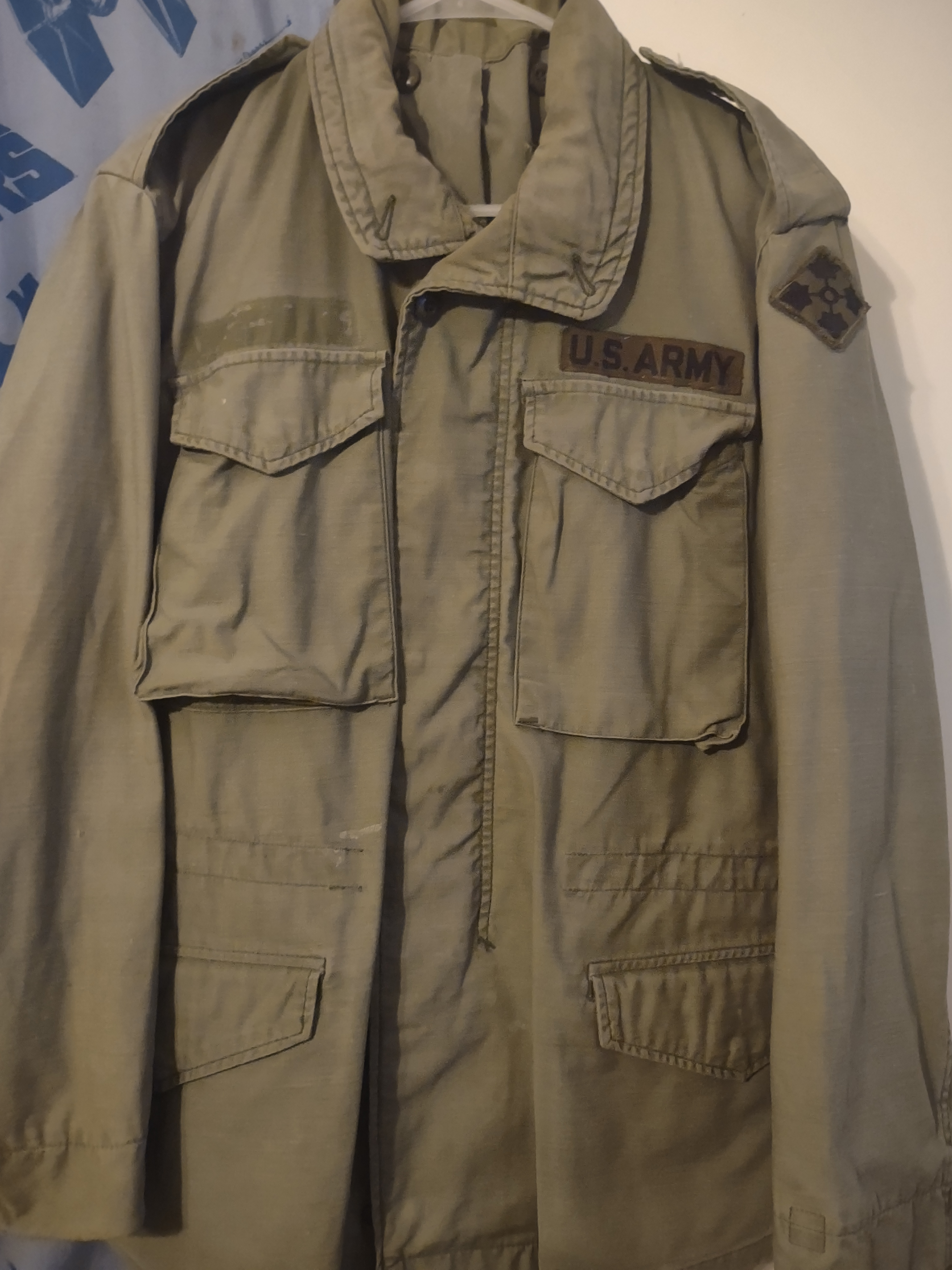
- M-1965 field jacket in olive drab, with wearer's last name redacted and 4th Infantry Division patch on the sleeve.
- Type: Coat
- Place of origin: United States

Service history
- In service: 1965–2009
- Used by: United States Armed Forces
- Wars: Vietnam War

Production history
- Designer: Alpha Industries
- Designed: 1965
- Produced: 1965–2020
- Variants: Olive drab, woodland camouflage, 6-color desert camouflage, 3-color desert camouflage, universal camouflage

The M-1965 field jacket, officially Coat, Cold Weather, Field (also known as M65, M-65 field jacket, and Coat, Cold Weather, Man's Field), named for the year it was introduced, was a popular military field jacket which for decades was issued to supplement fatigues and BDUs for colder or wetter conditions.

The M65 field jacket was widely fielded and used by the United States' forces during the Vietnam War, in which the jacket became useful for troops serving in the Central Highlands of South Vietnam due to its wind and rain resistance, especially in the monsoon season and after. It was a standard issue to U.S. troops in several other wars all around the globe as well, due to its long service life. Variations of the jacket are still used in countries like Austria or South Korea. The U.S. ceased issuing the M65 field jacket in 2009, with the final variant utilizing the Universal Camouflage Pattern.

== History ==
Initially designed for the United States Army under the MIL-C-43455 standard by Alpha Industries. It was introduced into U.S. military service in 1965 to replace the previous M-1951 field jacket, itself an improvement on the M-1943 field jacket introduced during World War II, although the M-51 continued to be issued for quite some time.

Because the jacket was so widely issued out during the Vietnam War, the jacket ended being worn by veteran protestors of the war. The jacket has also been produced for civilian use since at least the early 1970s, and has been available in many different colors and patterns, many of which were never used by the United States Army or any other armed service. Official jackets formally produced for the U.S. military came in solid olive green, four-color woodland camouflage, six-color desert camouflage (until 1991), three-color desert camouflage, and the Universal Camouflage Pattern (from 2007).

== Designs ==
The front portion of the jacket has two large hip pockets and two medium-sized breast pockets. The collar of the jacket features a zipper which houses a protective hood. The M-1965 field jacket can be combined with a button-in insulated lining for cold-weather wear, as well as a button-on fur trimmed winter hood. The jacket was fastened with a large aluminum chrome zipper (1966–1971), with a storm flap fastened with snaps covering it. The zipper was later changed to brass (1972–1986), and then nylon (1986–2008).

The jacket is constructed of a durable cotton or cotton-nylon or cotton-polyester blend sateen fabric, which was windproof due to its tight weave and water-resistant due to that and chemical treatment, originally in OG-107. Like many other uniform items at the time and in the past, Marine Corps examples were stamped with "USMC". The jacket was one of the first mainstream garments to incorporate Velcro in its design, on the cuffs and collar.

As early as 1966, the OG-107 jackets were made of manufactured with a 50/50 Cotton/Nylon (Nyco) outershell. These models continued as late as 1989. The period of 1966–1989 featured chemical treatment, likely Quarpel.

Later, the jacket was issued in the four-color Woodland camouflage pattern beginning in 1981, coinciding with the introduction of the Battle Dress Uniform (BDU). Later versions were made using the camouflage patterns of the six-color Desert Battle Dress Uniform (DBDU), its replacement three-color Desert Camouflage Uniform (DCU) and the Universal Camouflage Pattern (UCP). Versions found in tiger stripe camouflage are commercial products, and were not part of military contracts.

The final variant (coat, cold weather, field universal pattern) was made in the UCP pattern, and had the addition of hook-and-loop fasteners for name tape, rank insignia and unit patches, with the shoulder straps used in the previous versions removed and also had a redesigned collar. This version was also made with waterproof material and from the introduction of the UCP pattern until the late 2000s it was standard issue along with other clothing. Commercial versions have also been made in the MultiCam pattern.

The M65 has since been replaced by the Gen II Extended Cold Weather Clothing System (ECWCS).

As of 2025, some new aftermarket M-65s, including a "Heritage" model by the original manufacturer, are Cotton/Nylon (Nyco) Twill instead of sateen.

== See also ==
- Uniforms of the United States Army
- Extended Cold Weather Clothing System
- Battle Dress Uniform
- 1951 Field Jacket
- "M65" Parka, Extended Cold Weather ("Fishtail Parka"), a similar and larger coat adopted in the same year.
- Doobon coat
