= M-1951 field jacket =

U.S. Army jacket

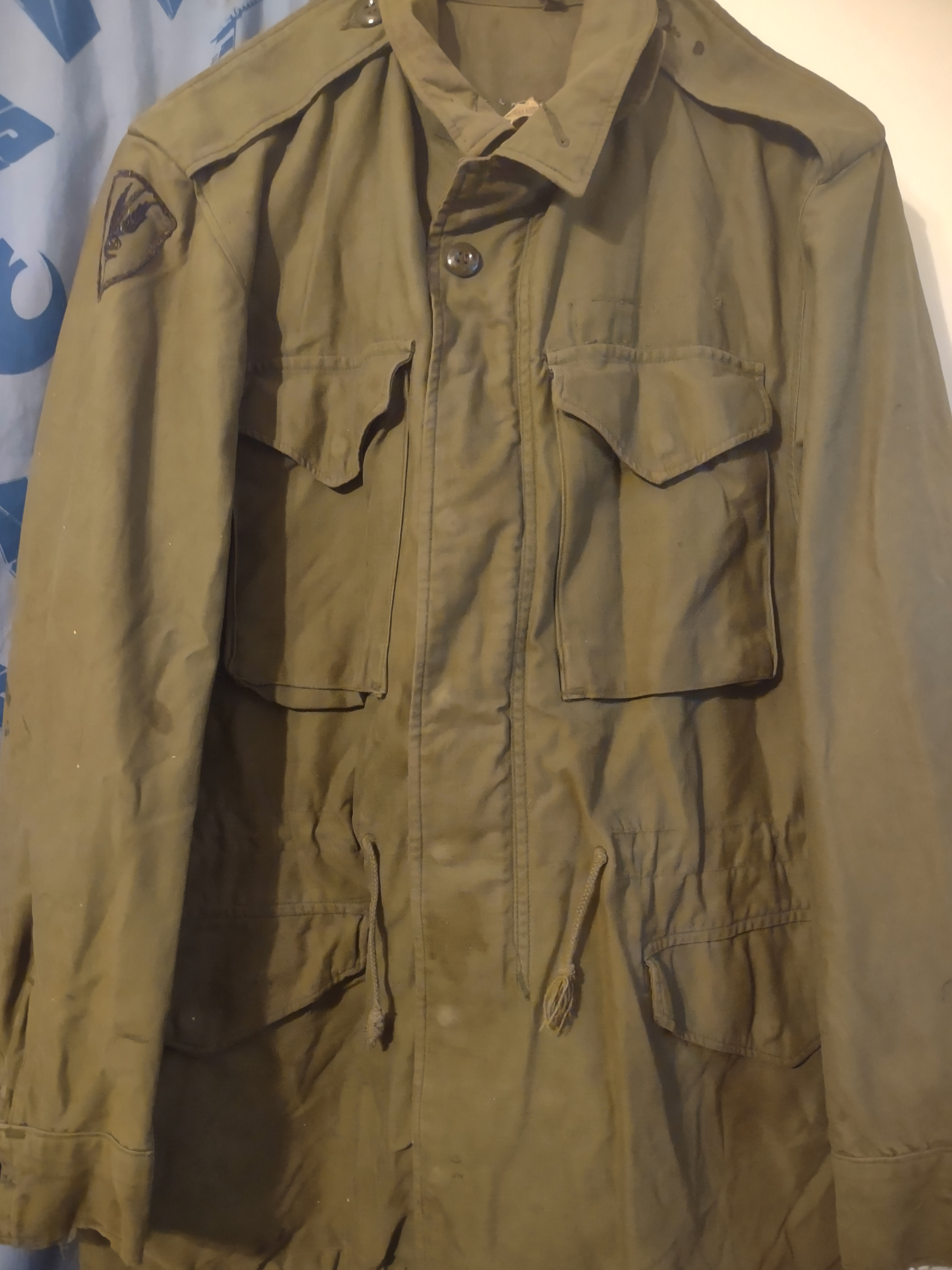
M-1951 field jacket with a 1st Aviation Brigade patch

The M-1951 field jacket was a U.S. Army four pocket jacket made of 9-ounce wind resistant, water repellent treated cotton sateen cloth in Olive Green Shade 107 (OG 107). Originally called Jacket, Shell, Field M-1951 it was redesignated as the M-1951 field coat in November 1956.

== Description ==
The M-1951 field jacket was based on the M-1943 field jacket. The M-1951 was given snap fasteners instead of buttons and an aluminium zipper. Earlier issue M-1951s had larger, brown buttons like on the M-1943, and later jackets had smaller brown, then green buttons as used on the M-1965 field jacket and later OG-107 fatigues. Unlike the later M-1965 that replaced it, the M-1951 had button cuffs, a pointed collar and had a separate hood that buttoned on to the collar (the latter of which could also be fit to the m-65). It also added a second drawstring to the bottom hem, and added holes to allow adjustment of the waist drawstring from the outside of the jacket, a feature which was later removed in the M-1965 model. In addition; it also added buttons for an internal wool-pile liner, a feature introduced in the largely forgotten M-1950 jacket, which itself was similar to the m-1943 with the exception mentioned prior and a change in sizing; although those liners are incompatible due to different sizing and button patterns. The M-51 is also compatible with the button spacing of most quilted nylon M-65 liners, though there will be unused buttons when used with the M-1951.

M-1951 field trousers were made of the same material and were also in the OG 107 color. They had six pockets similar to the M-1941 jumpsuit and were issued at the same time as the field jacket in organizational issue. Like the jacket, it had a separate cold weather wool pile liner that could be buttoned in. The trousers had drawstrings on the trouser cuffs and waist and cloth straps inside the cargo pockets that could be used to support heavy items. Suspenders could also be worn with the field trousers.

== See also ==
- Uniforms of the United States Army
