= United States Army uniforms in World War II =

The United States Army in World War II used a variety of standard and non-standard dress and battle uniforms, which often changed depending upon the theater of war, climatic environment, and supply exigencies.

== Men's service uniforms ==
U.S. Army basic service uniforms consisted of a winter service uniform of olive drab wool worn in temperate weather, and a summer service uniform of khaki cotton fabric worn in tropical weather. In addition to the service uniforms worn for ordinary duty and dress purposes there were a variety of fatigue and combat uniforms. Summer and winter service uniforms were worn during their respective seasons in the continental United States. During the war, the European Theater of Operations (Northwestern Europe) was considered a year-round temperate zone and the Pacific Theater of Operations a year-round tropical uniform zone. In the Mediterranean Theater of Operations, U.S. soldiers wore both seasonal uniforms.

=== Enlisted men's service uniforms ===
==== Winter uniforms ====
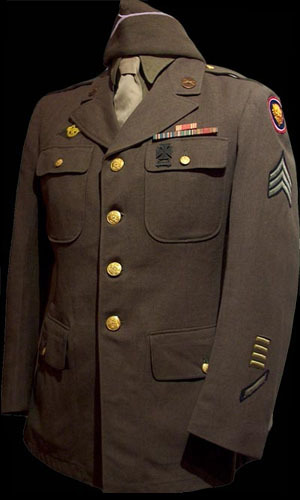
Army Enlisted Men's Winter Service Uniform

The enlisted men's winter service uniform in 1941 consisted of a wool serge four-button coat with four pockets in olive drab shade no. 33 (OD 33), wool trousers, and a long-sleeved wool shirt, both in olive drab shade 32 (OD 32). A russet brown leather belt with a brass buckle was worn with the coat until 1941, when it ceased being standard issue as a leather conservation measure, with the belt hooks on the coat being eliminated as well. Many enlisted men continued to fit belt hooks to their coats and privately purchased their own belts, and they can often be seen being worn long after the 1941 termination date.

Shirts, which featured two patch pockets and no shoulder straps, were either OD 32 wool flannel or khaki cotton chino cloth. Either color of shirt could be worn under the coat, but the cotton shirt could not be worn as an outer garment with the wool trousers when the coat was not worn. The initial shirt design had a stand-up collar like a typical dress shirt. In 1941, the shirt was redesigned with the collar band removed so the collar would lie flat when worn without a necktie in the field. In 1944, the color of the shirt and trousers was changed to OD 33.

In 1941, the necktie for the winter uniform was black wool and the summer necktie was khaki cotton. In February 1942, a universal mohair wool necktie in olive drab shade no. 3 (OD 3) replaced both previous neckties. The OD 3 necktie was shortly superseded by a khaki cotton–wool blend necktie. The khaki necktie was mandated for wear with both summer and winter service uniforms. Whenever a shirt was worn as an outer garment, the necktie was tucked between the first and second exposed buttons of the shirt.

==== Summer uniforms ====
The enlisted men's summer service uniform consisted of the cotton khaki uniform shirt with matching trousers; the issue of the coat for this uniform was discontinued for enlisted men in the 1930s. As was the case for the wear of the winter uniform without a coat, the necktie was tucked between the first and second exposed buttons of the shirt. Although originally used as a summer combat uniform as well as a summer dress uniform, after the invasion of the Philippines in 1942 the khaki uniform was largely replaced as a summer combat uniform by the herringbone twill utility uniform.

==== Headgear ====
The peaked cap was discontinued for official issue to most enlisted soldiers after the end of 1941, but remained a popular item for private purchase. Thereafter, only the garrison cap in either olive drab for winter or khaki for summer wear with piping in the color of the soldier's branch of service was the designated enlisted service headgear. The soldier's distinctive unit insignia (DUI) was worn on the left front of the curtain if the unit issued one. However, after 1943 the manufacture of new DUIs under government contract was suspended for the duration of the war.

World War II U.S. Army branch piping colors
Branch	Color(s)
Adjutant General's Department	Dark blue and scarlet
Air Corps	Ultramarine blue and golden orange
Armored Center and units	Green and white
Cavalry	Yellow
Chaplain Corps	Black
Chemical Warfare Service	Cobalt blue and golden yellow
Coast and Antiaircraft Artillery	Scarlet
Corps of Engineers	Scarlet and white
Detached Enlisted Men's List	Green
Field Artillery	Scarlet
Finance Department	Silver gray and golden yellow
Infantry	Light (Saxony) blue
Inspector General's Department	Dark blue and light blue
Judge Advocate General's Department	Dark blue and white
Medical Department	Maroon and white
Military Intelligence	Golden yellow and purple
Military Police	Green and golden yellow
National Guard Bureau	Dark blue
Ordnance Department	Crimson and yellow
Permanent professors of the United States Military Academy	Scarlet and silver grey
Quartermaster Corps	Buff
Signal Corps	Orange and white
Specialist Reserve	Brown and golden yellow
Tank Destroyer Center and units	Orange and black
Transportation Corps	Brick red and golden yellow
Women's Army Corps	Mosstone green and old gold
Warrant officers	Brown
Warrant officers and flight officers (after 1940)	Silver and black
Officers (after 1940)	Gold and black
General officers (after 1940)	Gold

==== Footwear ====
Issue footwear consisted of russet brown low-quarter leather cap toe boots. For more on Army footwear see combat uniforms below.

=== Officer's service uniforms ===
==== Winter uniforms ====
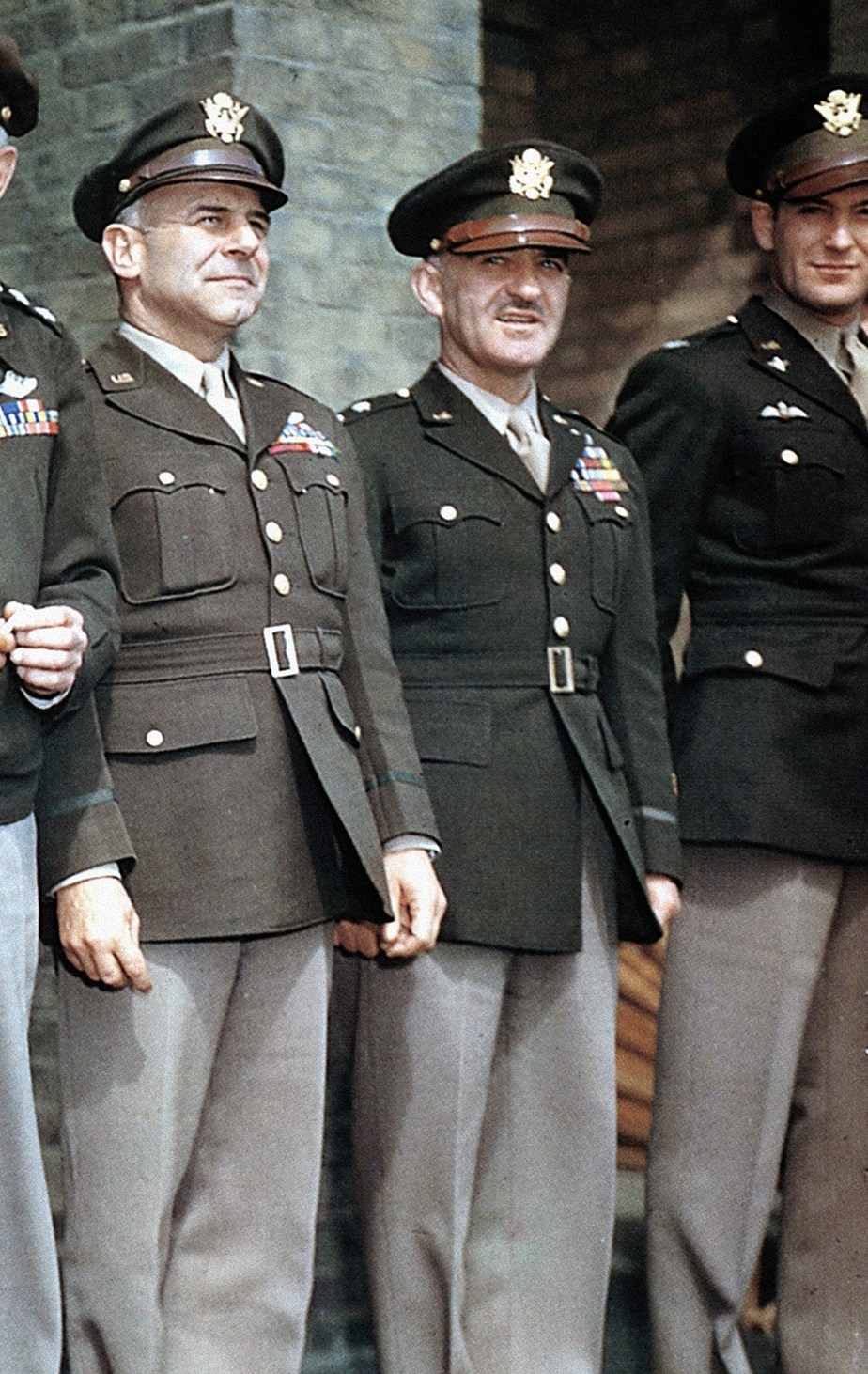
U.S. Army Air Forces officers wearing the "pinks and greens" service uniform combination

The male officer's winter service uniform in 1941 consisted of a four-button, four-pocket coat of finer wool fabric in olive drab shade no. 51 (OD 51), a very dark olive green with brownish hue. The coat was worn with a russet brown leather Sam Browne belt until 1942 when the leather belt was replaced by a cloth belt of matching fabric. Officers could wear trousers matching the color and fabric of the coat, or optionally they were allowed trousers of a contrasting pinkish taupe, officially called drab shade no. 54, of the same material as the coat. The combination was commonly called "pinks and greens". Officers were also authorized to use the more durable OD 33 enlisted uniforms, except for the enlisted men's four pocket service coat, as long as they were not mixed with OD 51 or taupe clothing.

Officers' shirts, unlike the enlisted shirts, included buttoned shoulder straps. Officers had additional shirt color and fabric options. In 1941 these shirts included cotton or tropical worsted wool khaki shirts that could be worn with either the summer or winter service uniforms and wool shirts in OD 33 or OD 51 with the winter uniform. Additionally, in 1944, taupe shirts matching the trousers were authorized. Officers wore black and khaki neckties with winter and summer uniforms respectively, like enlisted soldiers, until after February 1942 when the universal neckties were changed to khaki for all ranks. As with enlisted men, officers could not wear khaki shirts as an outer garment with the wool trousers. The shirt had to be either the same shade OD 51 as the trousers or the OD 51 shirt with the taupe trousers.

==== Summer uniforms ====
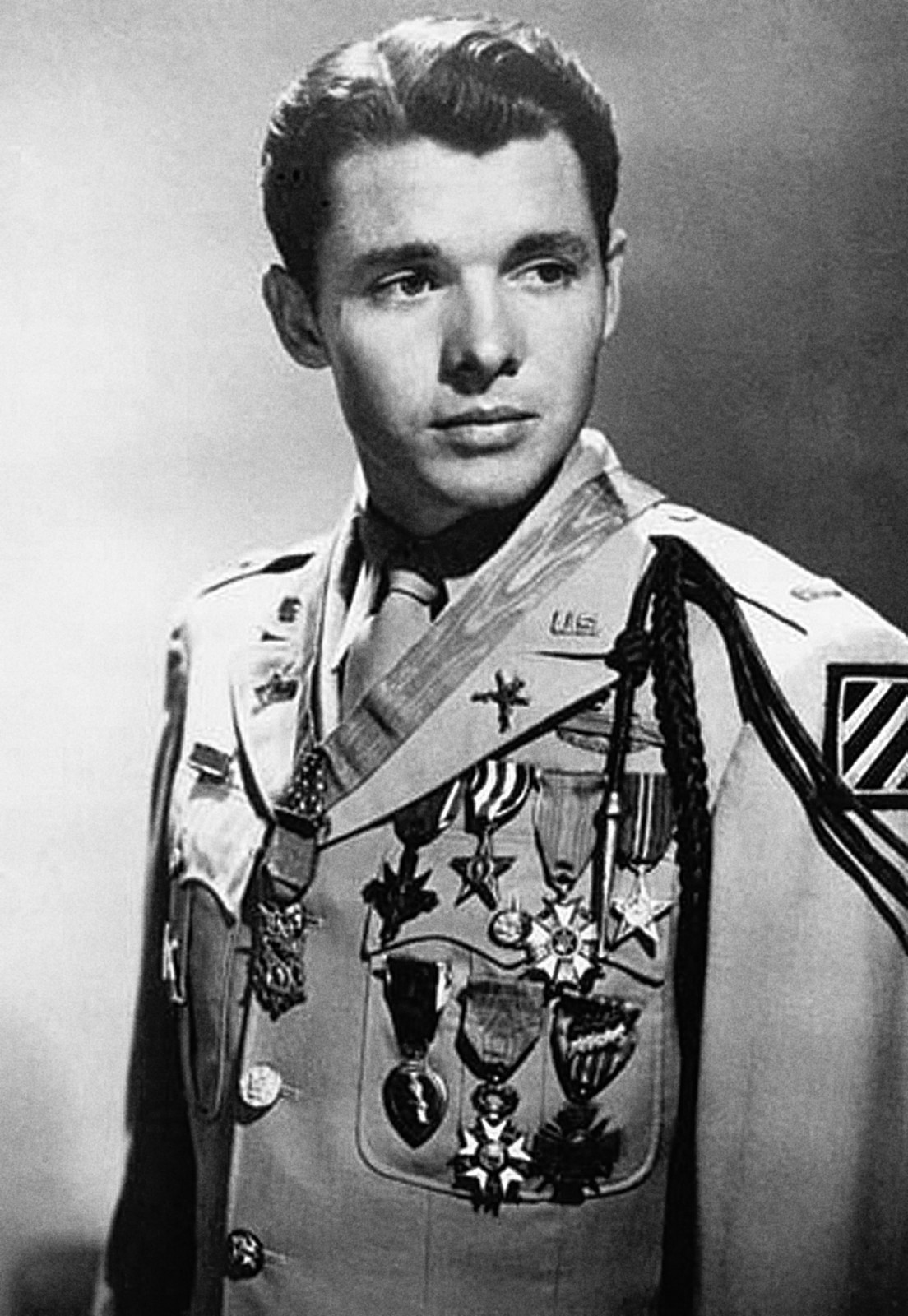
Audie Murphy photographed in 1948 wearing the U.S. Army khaki summer service uniform with full-size medals.

Male officer's summer service uniforms usually consisted of a wash-and-wear cotton khaki uniforms similar to those of enlisted men but with shoulder straps added. However, officers also had the option of purchasing a khaki summer service uniform of tropical-weight worsted suiting fabric, commonly called "TWs", which included a coat. The coat of the TW uniform was identical in cut to the winter officers' uniform but omitted the cloth belt of the winter service coat.

==== Headgear ====
Officer's headgear for the winter uniform consisted of either an OD 51 peaked service cap with a russet leather visor or a garrison cap matching the OD fabric shade worn. The garrison cap for officers was piped around the curtain with black and gold cord except for general officers whose piping was all gold. The officer's rank insignia was worn on the left front side of the garrison cap. The service cap was also available in khaki tan with a removable top to be worn with the khaki summer uniform. Optionally khaki garrison caps were worn with the summer khaki uniform with the same piping as the winter OD version.

==== Footwear ====
Footwear normally consisted of the same type of russet brown leather shoes used by enlisted soldiers.

=== Eisenhower jacket ===
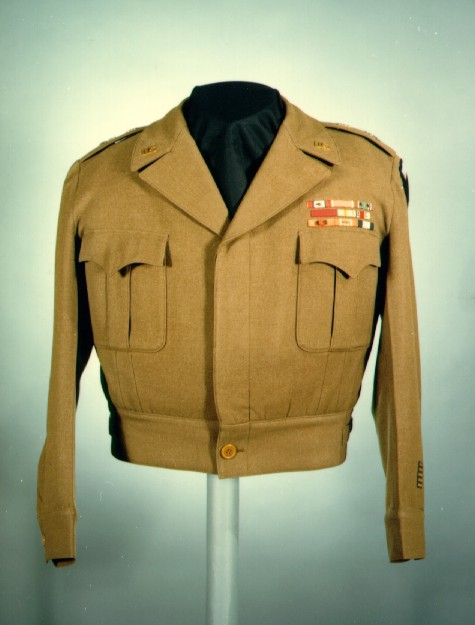
One of General Eisenhower's personal jackets

During the war in Europe a short jacket was adopted by General Dwight D. Eisenhower as an alternative to the 4 pocket service coat. The "Eisenhower jacket", or "Ike jacket", was popular. It closely resembled the short British Battle Dress jacket that inspired it. However, development and approval by the Army was slow. Except for small runs of jackets made for soldiers in England, the U.S. Army did not provide the jacket as an issue item to enlisted soldiers until the war in Europe was almost over.

Two forerunner jackets were manufactured in England and issued to troops in the European Theatre of Operations (ETO) before the Ike jacket was approved Army-wide. The first of these was essentially a wool version of the 1941 pattern poplin field jacket, while the second more closely resembled the final Ike jacket in form. These jackets were authorized only in the ETO, and are commonly called "ETO jackets". There were also non-standard conversions of service costs made for soldiers, particularly officers, by tailors in the United Kingdom with degrees of variation.

The standard-issue M44 wool field jacket, made of fine-quality OD 33 wool, was originally designed as a liner to be worn under the M1943 combat jacket. While originally intended as a field or combat jacket, it was nearly always reserved for service or dress wear. The full phase-out of the enlisted service coat was only completed after the war was over, though it had returned by the Korean War.

=== Wear of insignia and badges ===
With the service uniform, the enlisted arm of service insignia was embossed on circular pins, while the officer's insignia was "free work" (i.e., open design with no backing). Officers' arm of service pins ("U.S." for the Regular Army) were worn on the upper lapels and their branch of service pins were worn on their lower lapels. Enlisted men wore the U.S. disk on the right and the branch disk on the left upper lapel. The rank of officers was worn on the outer edge of the shoulder loops whereas enlisted soldiers wore rank chevrons three inches wide points-up on both upper arms. Organizational patches were worn on the left upper shoulder only.

When the coat was worn, no insignia was worn on the shirts except sew-on patches. When the shirt was worn as an outer garment, officers wore pin on insignia on the shirt. Until 1942, the officers' U.S. pin was worn on the right collar point and the officers' branch insignia was worn on the left. The officers' rank was worn on the outer ends of the shoulder loops as on the coat. After September 1942, the U.S. pin was deleted, and the rank of the wearer was displayed on the right collar point.

Distinctive Unit Insignia pins (featuring the unit's coat-of-arms) were worn in the center of the epaulet for officers and on the lower lapels for enlisted men. These devices were relatively uncommon during the war as a metal-conservation measure.

Wound Chevrons (awarded from 1918 to 1932 for wounds in combat) were worn on the lower right sleeve between the cuff and the elbow. Service stripes, or "hash marks", (awarded for every 3 years of service) were worn on the lower left sleeve. World War I Overseas Chevrons (created 1918) and/or World War II Overseas Bars, or "hershey bars" (created 1944) (awarded for each six months of service overseas) were worn on the lower left sleeve between the elbow and lower sleeve, but above the Service Stripes. The World War II Bars were worn over the World War I Chevrons. After 1953 the Service Stripes were kept on the lower left sleeve and the Overseas Service Stripes were moved to the lower right sleeve.

Parachutist's Wings, Pilot's Wings, the Expert Infantryman Badge, the Combat Infantryman Badge, or the Combat Medical Badge were worn above the left pocket. Discharged soldiers returning home wore the embroidered Honorable Discharge Emblem (or "Ruptured duck") on the uniform over the right pocket on a diamond-shaped olive drab cloth backing. American and foreign medals or medal ribbons were worn above the left pocket. American and foreign Unit citation ribbons are worn over the right top tunic pocket. The Meritorious Unit Commendation patch (created 1944), awarded to a unit for at least six months of exemplary combat service or combat support, is worn on the lower right sleeve above the cuff and below the Wound Chevrons.

== Women's service uniforms ==
Female members of the U.S. Army during WWII were assigned to either the Army Nurse Corps (ANC) or the Women's Auxiliary Army Corps (WAAC/WAC). The ANC preceded the WAAC/WAC so the two branches had separate uniform distinctions.

=== Army Nurse Corps uniforms ===
Prior to 1943, the ANC winter service uniform consisted of the ANC pattern dark blue cap or garrison cap with maroon piping, suit jacket with maroon cuff braid and gold army buttons, light blue or white shirt, black tie and light blue skirt; shoes were black or white. The ANC summer service uniform consisted of a similar suit in beige with maroon shoulder strap piping and cuff braid, beige ANC cap or beige garrison cap with maroon piping, white shirt, and black four-in-hand tie. During World War II the first flight nurses uniform consisted of a blue wool battle dress jacket, blue wool trousers and a blue wool men's style maroon piped garrison cap. The uniform was worn with either the ANC light blue or white shirt and black tie. After 1943 the ANC adopted olive drab service uniforms similar to the newly formed WAC. Nurses wore Army hospital whites on ward duty.

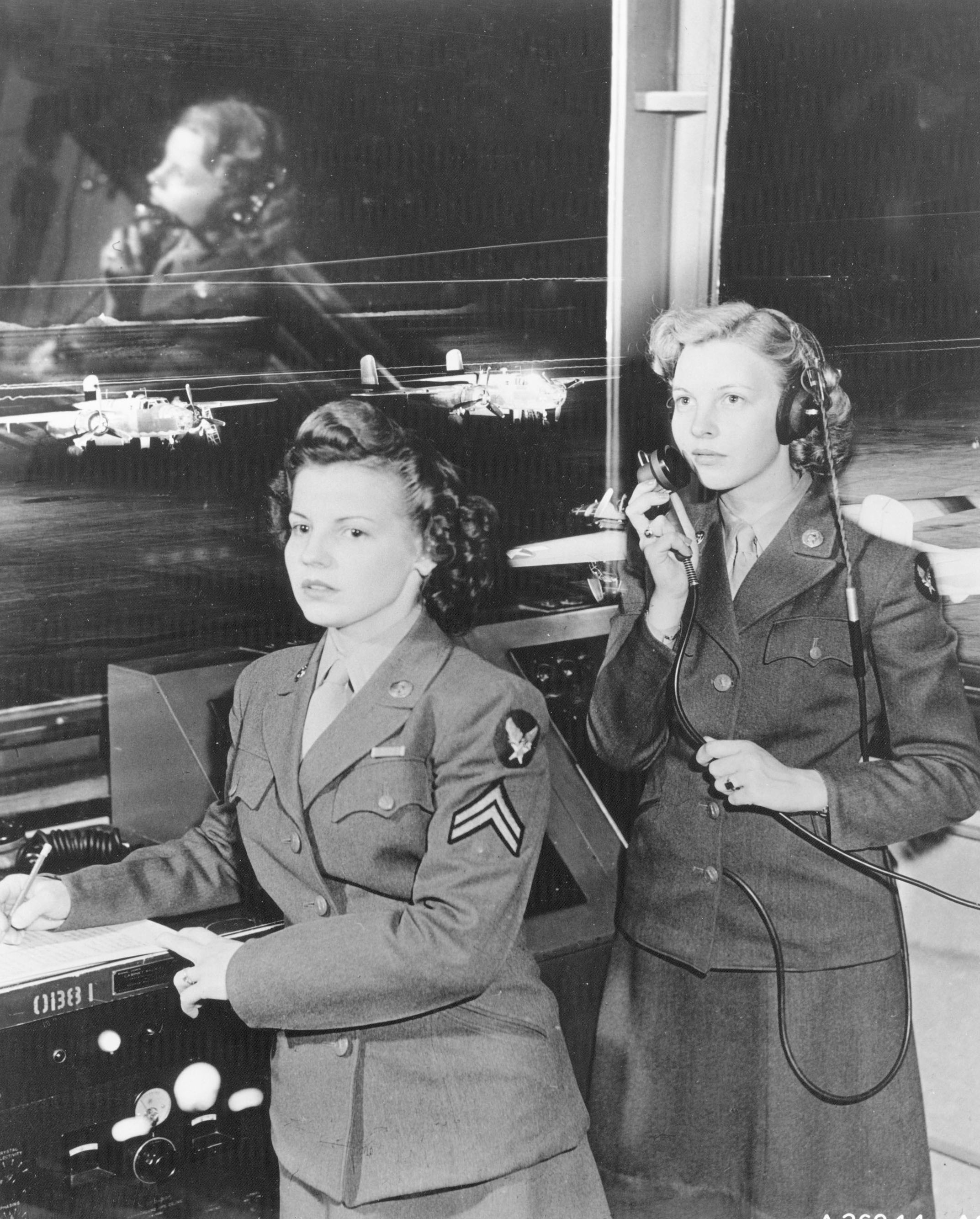
Female service dress in OD shade 33 at Randolph Field, 1944

=== WAAC and WAC Uniforms ===
In May 1942 Congress approved the creation of the Women's Auxiliary Army Corps. Although the ANC were actual service members of the U.S. Army, the members of the WAAC were not, so they wore Army style uniforms with distinctly different insignia than U.S. Army service members. In the summer of 1943 the WAAC was converted to the Women's Army Corps (WAC). From that point the WAC were U.S. Army service members and their insignia was changed to that of the regular army.

Female service dress went through an evolution of patterns over the course of the war years, however throughout the period the service uniforms both summer and winter generally consisted of the WAC pattern "Hobby" hat or women's garrison cap, a women's suit coat, shirtwaist, four-in-hand tie, skirt, russet leather women's service shoes and hand bag. The women's olive drab wool "Ike jacket" was also worn as were women's service trousers. The colors essentially mirrored those of their male counterparts of corresponding rank in the equivalent service uniform although fabrics differed. There were also special off-duty dresses of summer beige and winter tan.

After the WAC were established the ANC adopted the WAC officer's uniforms, except for the ANC pattern hat and the ANC pattern handbag. However, those items were changed to olive drab and russet leather respectively. The ANC off duty dress was a separate ANC pattern in olive drab shade 51 or beige. The previous ANC beige summer service uniform with maroon trim was retained except that the tie was changed to maroon.

== Combat and utility uniform ==
The U.S. Army during the inter-war period followed the previous model of having a standard uniform that combined elements of both the service uniform and field uniform. By combining the uniforms, it was thought that time and money could be saved. The temperate climate field configuration consisted of the olive drab wool trousers, shirt, and russet brown shoes from the service uniform worn with canvas leggings, helmet and web gear. An outer jacket or coat, either the Model 1938 "Overcoat, Mackinaw, Roll Collar" or the M1941 field jacket, nicknamed the "Parson jacket" after its designer, in OD 3 was issued. At the outset of the war, the khaki cotton summer uniform was intended to serve as a tropical climate field uniform.

In the European Theater of Operations, the basic wool uniform saw the most use and had the greatest functionality, being able to keep the soldier warm in the winter with its insulation and relatively cool and breathable in Northern European summer weather. However, the M1941 field jacket received considerable criticism; it was poorly insulated and the light cotton shell provided little protection from wind or rain. In addition, the light OD 3 coloring was deemed inappropriate for use in northern Europe, as it stood out against most backdrops, making soldiers more visible targets.

=== Herringbone twill uniform ===
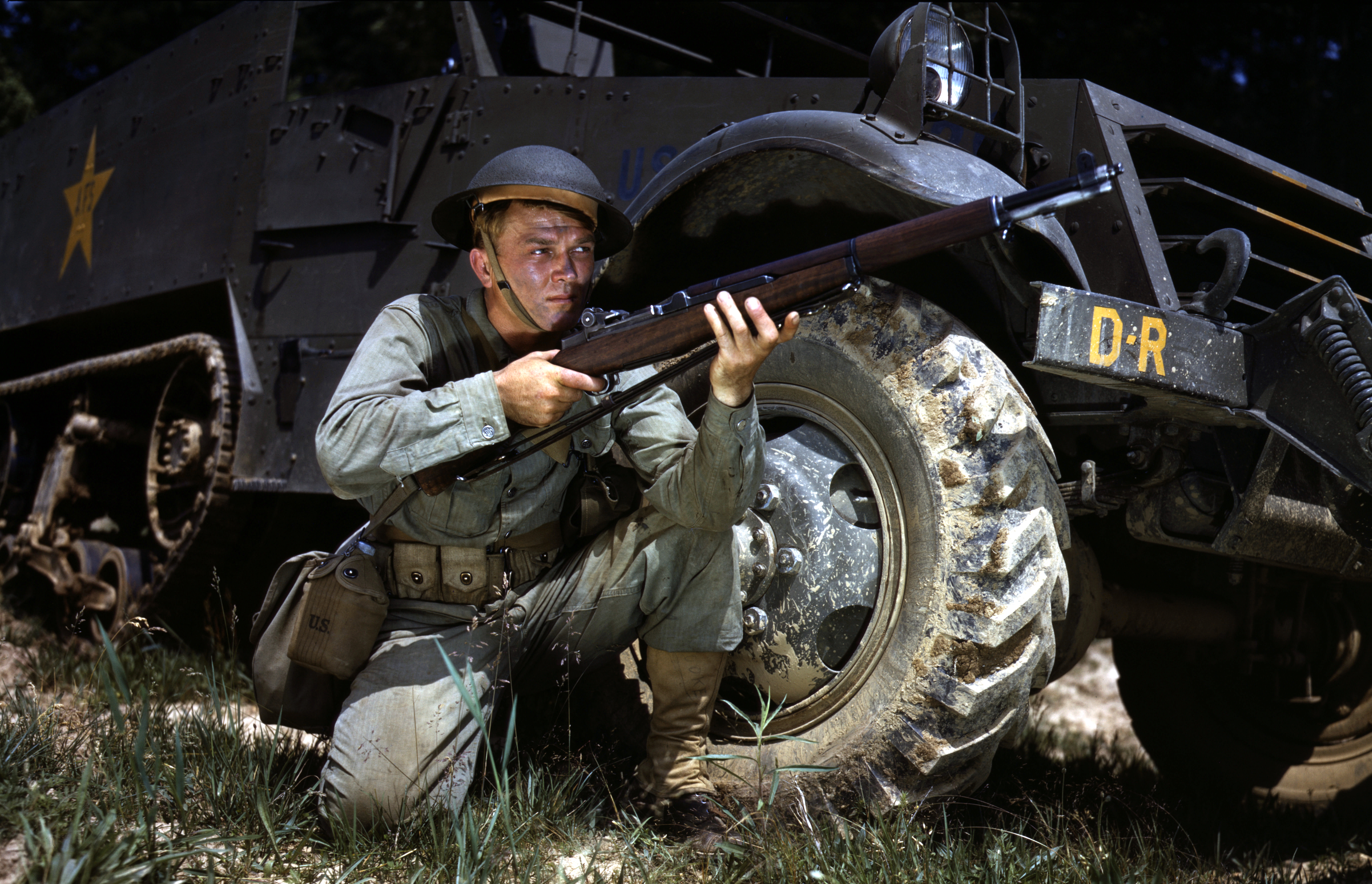
An infantryman wearing the first-pattern herringbone twill uniform.

Additionally, a fatigue-duty uniform made of 8.2-ounce heavy cotton herringbone twill (HBT) cloth was issued. The uniform consisted of a shirt, trousers, and a hat. Initially, this was a circular-brimmed "clamdigger"-style hat which was later replaced by a billed cap that was based on a design used by railroad workers. It was intended to be worn over the basic wool or cotton uniforms to provide protection during fatigue duties, but it proved to be much better material than the primary wool uniform for hot weather and so saw use as a combat uniform in nearly all of the major theaters of combat in which the US was involved.

The original 1941 version came in a light sage green color that faded with repeated washing. As a local measure for operations in New Guinea during 1942, uniforms were dyed a darker green. The later 1943 version had small changes in tailoring and came in a darker olive drab shade No. 7, matching the new M1943 version of the field jacket.

=== Paratrooper uniform ===
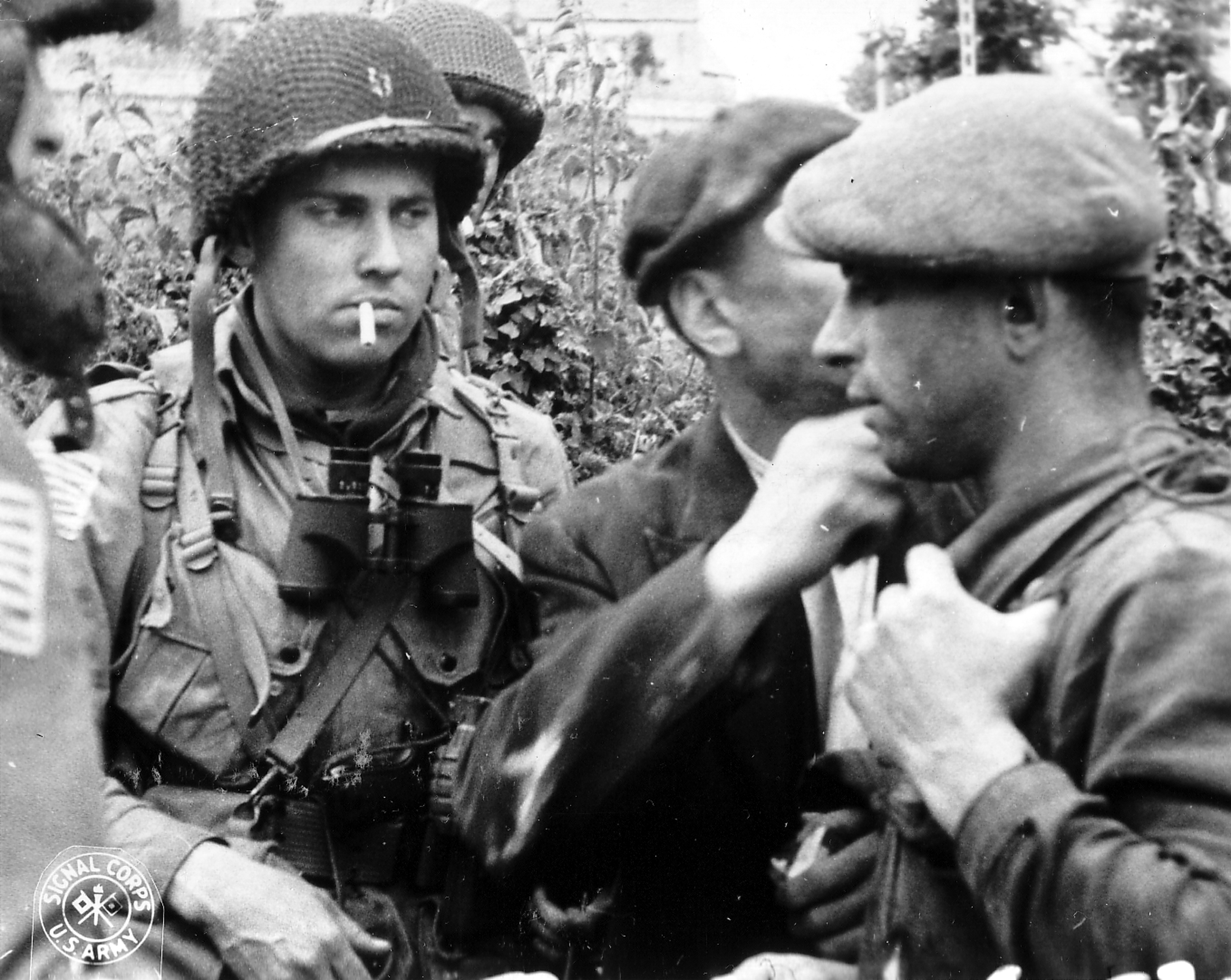
U.S. paratroopers wearing M42 paratrooper uniforms reporting on the situation during the Battle of Normandy in 1944.

Paratroopers assigned to airborne units during the earlier parts of the war wore a distinct field uniform intended to provide for the distinct conditions of airborne combat. The M42 Parachute Jumper uniform consisted of a coat with four front patch pockets with two snap fasteners on each, along with a unique dual-zippered knife pocket located on the upper lapel, which was designed to contain a switchblade pocketknife. The trousers had five internal pockets and a large patch pocket on each thigh. The thigh pockets were closed by two snaps like the coat pockets. After the 82nd's jumps into Italy, they found that the trousers and jacket tore often at the elbows and knees. Before Normandy, the Reinforced M42 Jump Uniform was issued, with canvas patches at the elbows, knees, and shins. The uniform was worn with distinct jump boots instead of the low-quarter shoes and canvas leggings used by standard infantry. It was replaced by the M1943 Uniform, though M42 uniforms continued to be worn through the Battle of Normandy and by most troopers until the end of the war.

=== The M1943 field uniform ===
The M1943 uniform came into service in the later half of World War II. The uniform was designed as a layered system, meant to be worn over the wool shirt and trousers, and in conjunction with a wool sweater and liners in colder weather.

The most recognizable part of the uniform is the standardized M1943 field jacket. It was longer than the earlier 1941 field jacket, coming down to the upper thighs. It was made of windproof cotton sateen and was issued in a new darker olive drab color, OD 7. The jacket also had a detachable hood, drawstring waist, two large breast pockets, and two lower skirt pockets.

The trousers were made out of the same OD 7 cotton sateen material were equipped with neither front nor rear pockets, but a more economical large cargo pocket sewn to each side. They also had buttoned tabs at the waist in order to cinch the waist.

In the ETO, initial issuance of the M1943 was slowed as a consequence of opposition by some U.S. commanders. However, as U.S. and Allied troops pushed into Germany, more M1943 uniforms or components of the uniform were issued as the supply situation (including replacements directly from stateside arrived) and the weather became harsher as winter arrived.

In use, the M1943 was very popular with the men in the field, being relatively comfortable and having large amounts of pocket space.

=== Experimental tropical uniform ===
In 1943, after extensive testing in the swamplands and jungles of Florida and Panama, the U.S. Army determined that an experimental tropical uniform made of Byrd Cloth (known in Britain as Grenfell Cloth), would best protect soldiers from insects and disease while cooling the body and minimizing losses from perspiration. Byrd Cloth, as used in the Experimental Tropical Uniform, was a single-layer uniform of untreated OD long-staple Egyptian cotton, made in a tightly woven herringbone twill to prevent mosquito bites. In use, the uniform was intended to cool the wearer even when continuously wetted, as might be expected in a humid, rainy jungle environment. The uniform featured a short-tailed shirt, trousers with cuffs fitted with half-inch boottop fastening tapes, and a flap-protected fly to keep out crawling insects such as leeches, ticks, and chiggers. Pockets were shallow and kept to a minimum to increase cooling; users carried all their gear in load-bearing belts, suspenders, or in low-mounted field packs designed to minimize body contact (jungle packs). The uniform, always in short supply because of a shortage of Byrd Cloth, was used in combat by members of the Office of Strategic Services (OSS) and the Mars Task Force (Army 5332nd Brigade-Provisional) in Burma.

Because of the shortage of suitable weaving machines and resultant cost of weaving Byrd Cloth, a less expensive 5-ounce OD cotton poplin shirt and trouser were issued on an experimental basis in 1944 for use in jungle and tropical regions; while reports were favorable, existing HBT stockpiles were deemed adequate, and the uniform was not adopted.

=== Women's fatigue uniforms ===
Nurses wore Army hospital whites on ward duty although a seersucker version with brown and white stripes was created because the whites were hard to maintain in some overseas areas. This dress was inspired by a WAC seersucker version the same color. Sage green fatigue uniforms of herringbone cotton twill for women, along with women's combat boots, field jackets and flight clothing, were manufactured by the U.S. Army during World War II. However, when women's versions of these items were not available, as was often the case in overseas areas, men's issue work/fatigue clothing was used instead. The M1942 HBT "clamdigger" utility hat was used extensively by the Women's Army Auxiliary Corps. They wore it with the back of the brim flipped up and the front of the brim pulled down and nicknamed it the "Daisy Mae Cap". It replaced the WAACs' distinctive "Hobby Hat" kepi for field use and fatigue duties.

== Footwear ==
Army combat footwear in World War II originally consisted of a basic tanned leather shoe, used with heavy canvas leggings, the "Shoes, Service, Composition Sole", also referred to as the"Type I" shoe in Army publications. This was an ankle-high field shoe made of tanned leather painted in a dark reddish-brown or "russet" color, originally with a rubber heel and leather sole. A rubber tap (half-sole) was added to the sole after late 1941 to extend the life of the shoe, creating the "Type II" shoe. In January 1943, a "roughout" field shoe designated "Shoes, Service, Reverse Upper, Composition Sole" or the "Type III" shoe began production. Designed as an improvement over the Type II shoe for field wear, it was essentially identical to the former in construction, but was made with a full rubber sole and heel and flesh-out uppers to improve water repellency by the addition of waterproofing wax. Once deliveries of the Type III shoe began for overseas use, the Type II shoe was restricted for issue in the continental United States only.

In January 1944, the "Boots, Service, Combat, Composition Sole," or "two-buckle boot," entered production, intended to replace the Type III service shoe. This boot was otherwise identical to the Type III shoe but had a longer tongue and permanently attached two-buckled leather cuff which was designed to replace the unpopular canvas leggings. Excepting combat testing in the Mediterranean Theater in 1943, the Type III shoes did not appear overseas in large numbers until just before D-Day, and the composition sole combat service boots in the fall of 1944; soldiers can be seen wearing both types of service shoes with leggings, and the newer combat boot. As the war went on, soles went from being made of natural rubber to synthetic or reclaimed rubber, and other measures were taken to conserve other shoe-making materials, such as leather and brass.

=== Specialized combat footwear ===
A rubber-soled, canvas-top Jungle boot was issued during the war for use by soldiers in the tropical and jungle environments typically encountered in the China-Burma-India (CBI) and the Pacific theaters. The 10th Mountain Division's troopers occasionally wore the Mountain Boot, a low-quarter brown leather boot with a square toe and rocker-type sole, though this boot was phased out in favor of the Type III Combat Boot in the last year of the war. In 1944, the M-44 Combat Boot, a high-top leather boot with full laces was adopted for service, but for the duration it was primarily worn by soldiers on stateside duty.

Parachute troops beginning in 1942 were issued Jump boots – high-lacing rubber-soled leather boots which were intended to provide additional ankle support when landing by parachute. Although these boots were to be replaced by the new M43 combat boots, jump boots continued to be worn throughout the war. Nicknamed "Corcorans", from the name of the first contractor to manufacture them, they have become a status symbol as the footwear of paratroopers and Rangers.

Overshoes were normally issued to Army units during winter operations. In January 1945, some Army units operating in the ETO received shoepacs for wet winter wear. The shoepac was a leather boot with rubberized lower top and sole, worn in conjunction with the wool ski sock. While it was effective in keeping feet protected from soaking and freezing ground, the shoepac lacked foot support and tended to wear quickly; it also resulted in incidents of foot injuries when a soldier wearing shoepacs on a march in freezing weather stopped to rest, allowing perspiration-soaked socks inside the boot to freeze.

== See also ==
- Pigeon vest – worn by American war pigeons in World War II
- Uniforms of the United States Army
- Uniforms of the United States Marine Corps
- History of the United States Army
- United States Army enlisted rank insignia of World War II
