= OG-107 =

Discontinued work utility uniform used by the United States Armed Forces

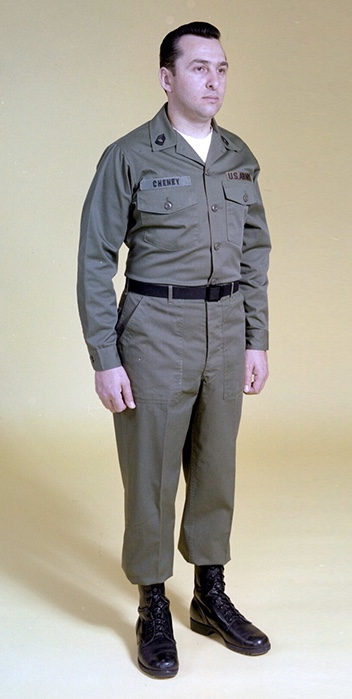
A U.S. Army soldier wearing an OG-507 uniform in 1977.

The OG-107 was the basic work and combat utility uniform (fatigues) of all branches of the United States Armed Forces from 1952 until its discontinuation in 1989. The designation came from the U.S. Army's coloring code "Olive Green 107", which was the shade of dark green used on the original cotton version of the uniform. The OG-107 was superseded by the Battle Dress Uniform (BDU) throughout the 1980s, and was also used by several other countries, including those that received military aid from the United States.

All versions of the OG-107 shared several basic design features. They were made out of an 8.5 ounce cotton sateen. The shirt had a buttoned front and two simple patch pockets on the upper chest that closed with a buttoned flap. It could be tucked in or worn outside the trousers, depending on the local commander's preference. The trousers were straight-leg pants with two simple front patch pockets with slash openings and two simple back patch pockets with button flaps. The trousers were intended to be bloused (tucked in) into boot tops; if sufficiently hot and humid, especially in hot climates like Vietnam, troops could be permitted to roll up their shirt sleeves and unblouse their trousers.

== History ==
The OG-107 uniform was introduced in 1952 during the Korean War. It became the standard for use both in the United States and on overseas deployment by the beginning of the Vietnam War. As the Tropical Combat Uniform (jungle fatigues) became more plentiful in South Vietnam, they began to replace the OG-107 uniform in combat units.

In the United States and foreign postings (outside of Southeast Asia), the OG-107 remained the standard uniform throughout the 1960s and 1970s. This is one of the longest-issued US Military uniforms, used from 1952 until the adoption of the woodland-patterned camouflage Battle Dress Uniform (BDU) replacement beginning in 1981 and completed in 1988. Minor modifications were made to the uniform over time, such as adding buttoned cuff slits in the mid-1960s.

== Variants ==
=== Basic designs ===
There were three basic models or "patterns" for the cotton sateen OG-107 Utility Uniform:

==== "Type I" (1952–1963) ====
The first "Type I" model was introduced in 1952 and remained virtually unchanged through its 10-year production run. The shirt featured a sleeve with no true cuff or buttons; it was simply a straight sleeve with a simple hem at the cuff. The shirt's chest pockets and the trousers's back pockets had a rectangular buttoning pocket flap. The buttons were a "dished" style, and either dark brown during the 1950s production run or mostly dark green during the 1960s production. The trousers also had a simple adjustment tab on the waist that could be buttoned. The garments were alpha sized (Small, Medium, etc.). The 'Type I' was replaced in April 1963 when specifications came out for the second model.

==== "Type II" (1963–1964) ====
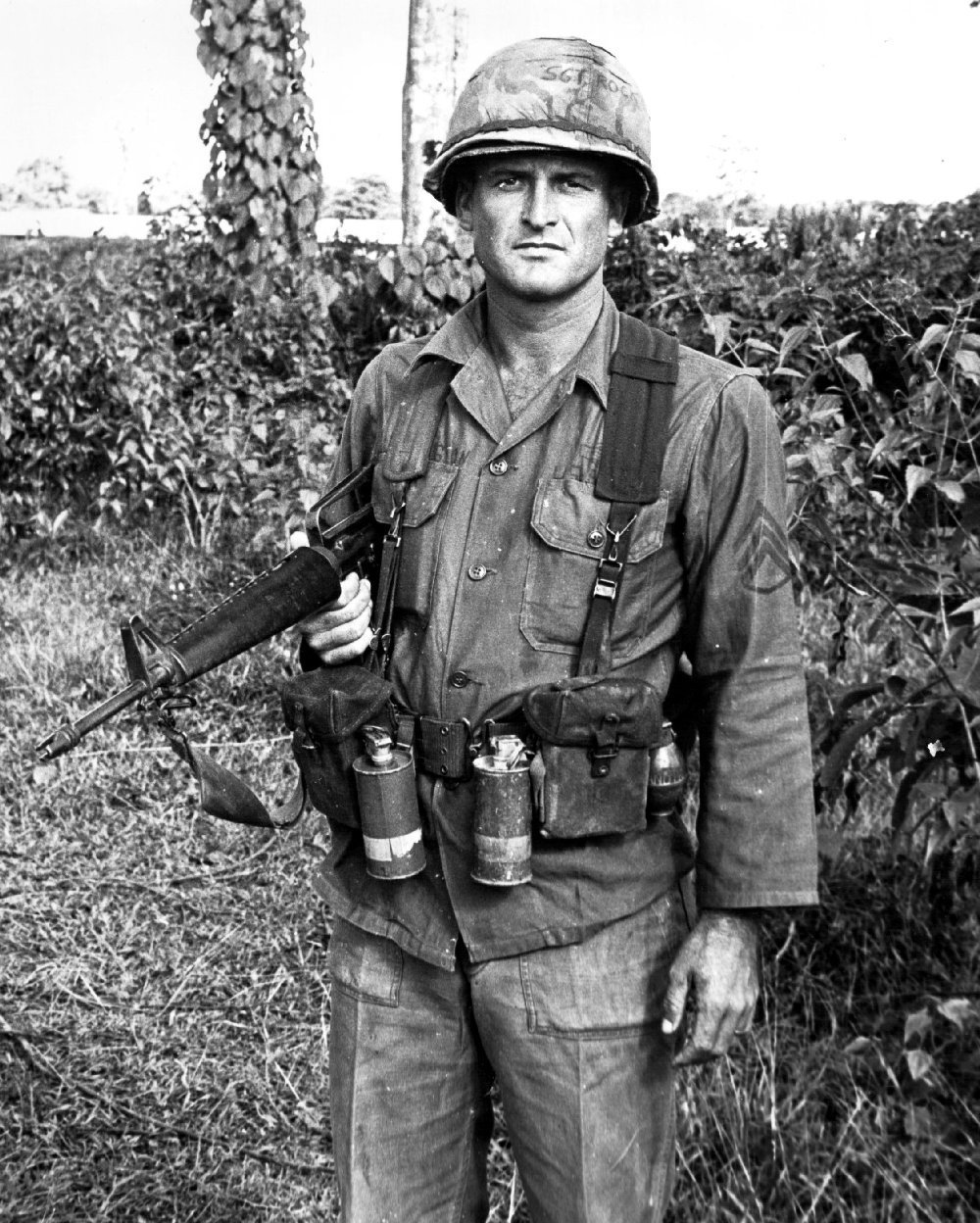
US Army Staff Sergeant Russell C. Fordham wearing the Type II with clipped pockets and tubular sleeves.

The "Type II" was specified for production in April 1963 and had several slight variations from the Type I. The only change of any real significance was the corner pocket flaps on the shirt being "clipped" to create a chamfered edge. As with the Type I, the shirt and trousers were also alpha sized. Due to the limited production time before the Type III was specified, these were seen as often as the Type I or III.

==== "Type III" (1964–1989) ====
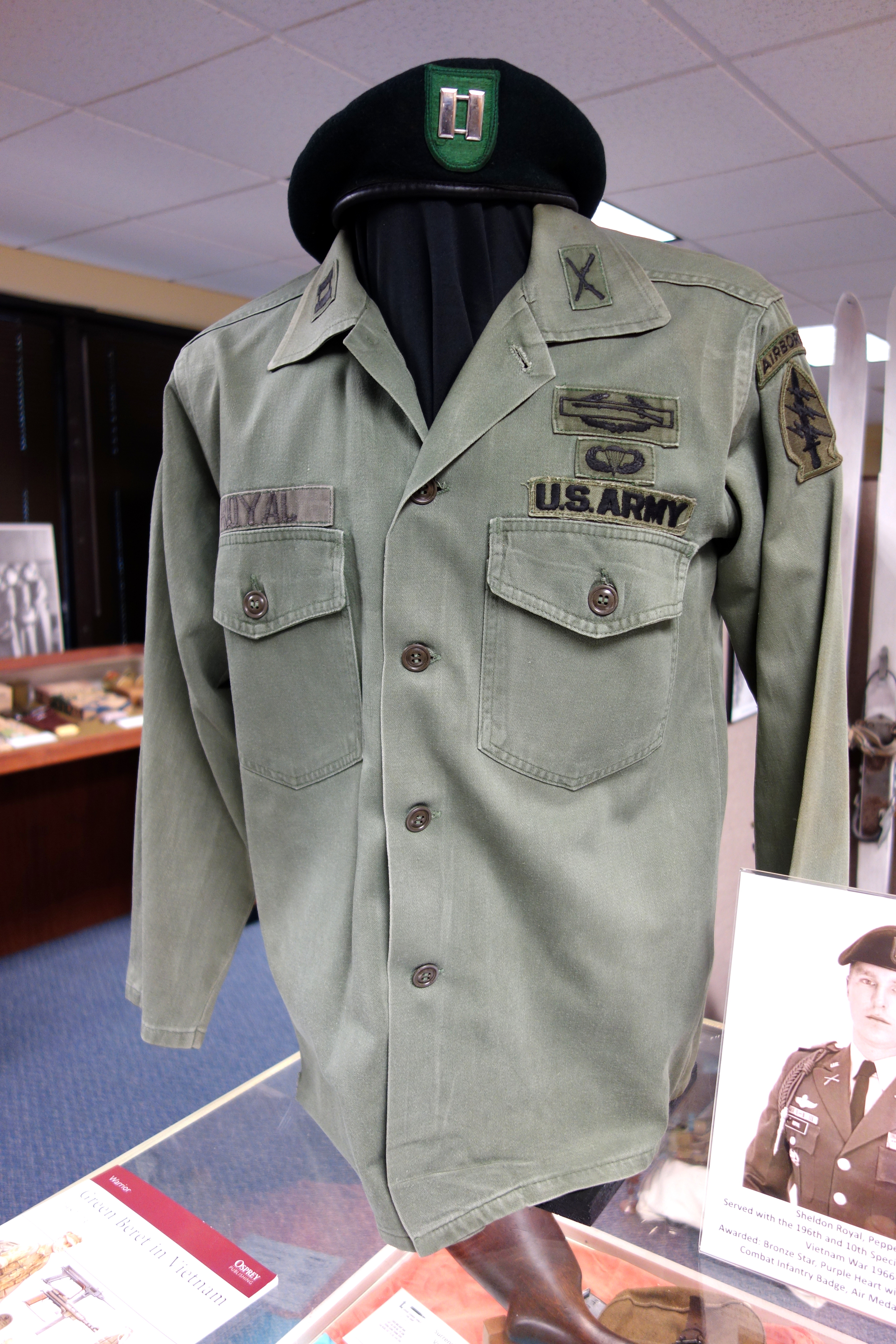
Third type cotton-sateen OG-107 shirt as worn in Vietnam 1966-1969

The "Type III" is the most common model and can be split into two versions based on the time of manufacture and material.

- Cotton – This version was specified at the very end of 1964 and still used the standard 8.5 ounce cotton sateen. However, due to changes in production and distribution time, they were rare until 1966. This version maintained the distinctive style features, such as the pocket placement, but with some key differences: the chest pocket flaps were now pointed; a button was added at the wrist; the button color changed to dull green plastic; the trouser waist adjustment tabs were removed; and the uniforms switched to body dimension sizing, as with dress uniforms.
- Poly-cotton blend – A second version came into use in 1975 and was in production until 1989, when it was replaced by the woodland BDU. This model used a 50/50 cotton-poly blend instead of 100% cotton. The difference in fiber material necessitated a modified color code, OG-507, but the two colors appeared identical. The poly-cotton uniforms were often referred to as "permanent press" or "durable press" as they did not require extensive starching, unlike the previous versions. They could be easily identified by a yellow tag in the garment.

=== Cold weather variant ===
A winter field uniform made of heavier-weight wool (or wool–nylon blend) was also introduced in 1951. The shirt featured a different shoulder construction with raglan sleeves, while the trousers had all interior pockets, in contrast to the patch pockets in the cotton uniform. The different material was given the color code OG-108. When worn in the field, the wool uniform was intended as an insulating layer worn under the M-1951 field jacket (later replaced by the revised M-1965 field jacket) and a pair of cotton shell trousers with cargo pockets. The wool uniform remained authorized until the mid-2000s.

The first version was 85 percent wool and 15 percent nylon. The second version was 80 percent wool.

=== Air Force "Crew Blues" ===
This was a unique and rare version of the Type II worn by Air Force Strategic Air Command Titan, Minuteman and Peacekeeper missile combat crews, along with Transient Alert crews over the course of two decades. Introduced around 1967, these dark blue two-piece fatigues were designated "Shirt, Man's, Cotton, Blue AF (Air Force), Shade 1577, Class 2" or "Man's Missile Combat Crew Alert AF Blue shade 1549". Due to their color, they were commonly referred to as "Crew blues". The blue-on-white name tapes used in the mid-1960s were retained for this uniform. A unique badge with the Air Force shield and 'COMBAT CREW' embroidered on it was worn above the right name tape. The wing and squadron insignia were worn on the left and right sleeves respectively, and the Strategic Air Command patch and missile badge worn on the right and left pockets. They were typically worn with an ascot scarf by the missile launch crews, with the color varying by squadron. Short-sleeve fatigue shirts were occasionally worn, though the long sleeve shirt is the most common. Missileers typically wore them when on duty in the Launch Control Center, though the popular MA-1 Flight Jacket was also worn as the capsule was usually somewhat cold. The 'Crew Blues' would later be replaced by a blue flight suit beginning in the mid-1990s.

=== Jungle fatigues ===
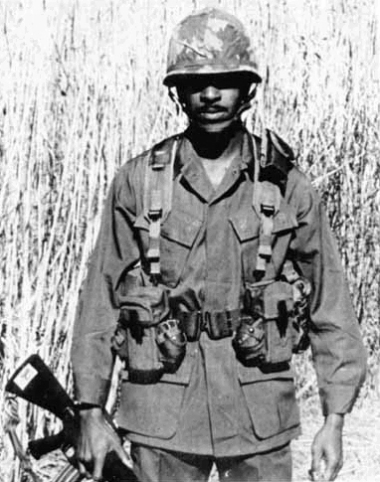
US Army soldier wearing Jungle fatigues and the new ALICE equipment

The Tropical Combat Uniform (TCU), commonly called "jungle fatigues", was issued to troops fighting in the Vietnam War beginning in 1964. It used the same OG-107 color as the standard utility uniform, but was of a different design and construction. Made out of lighter weight cotton poplin, the uniform consisted of trousers with cargo pockets on each leg and a bush jacket-style top with slanted chest pockets and two lower pockets. The uniform was revised multiple times during the war in response to issues with the design, and later in the war, versions using ERDL pattern camouflage were issued to special forces and Marines.

With issue dates as early as 1969, some OG-107 uniforms with slanted pockets and poplin cotton materials, were now being manufactured in ripstop configuration.

=== Other variants ===
Privately purchased, tailored versions with modifications, such as cargo pockets, pen pockets, and/or shoulder straps, were often produced. Officers occasionally added shoulder straps as found on service uniforms.

== Users ==
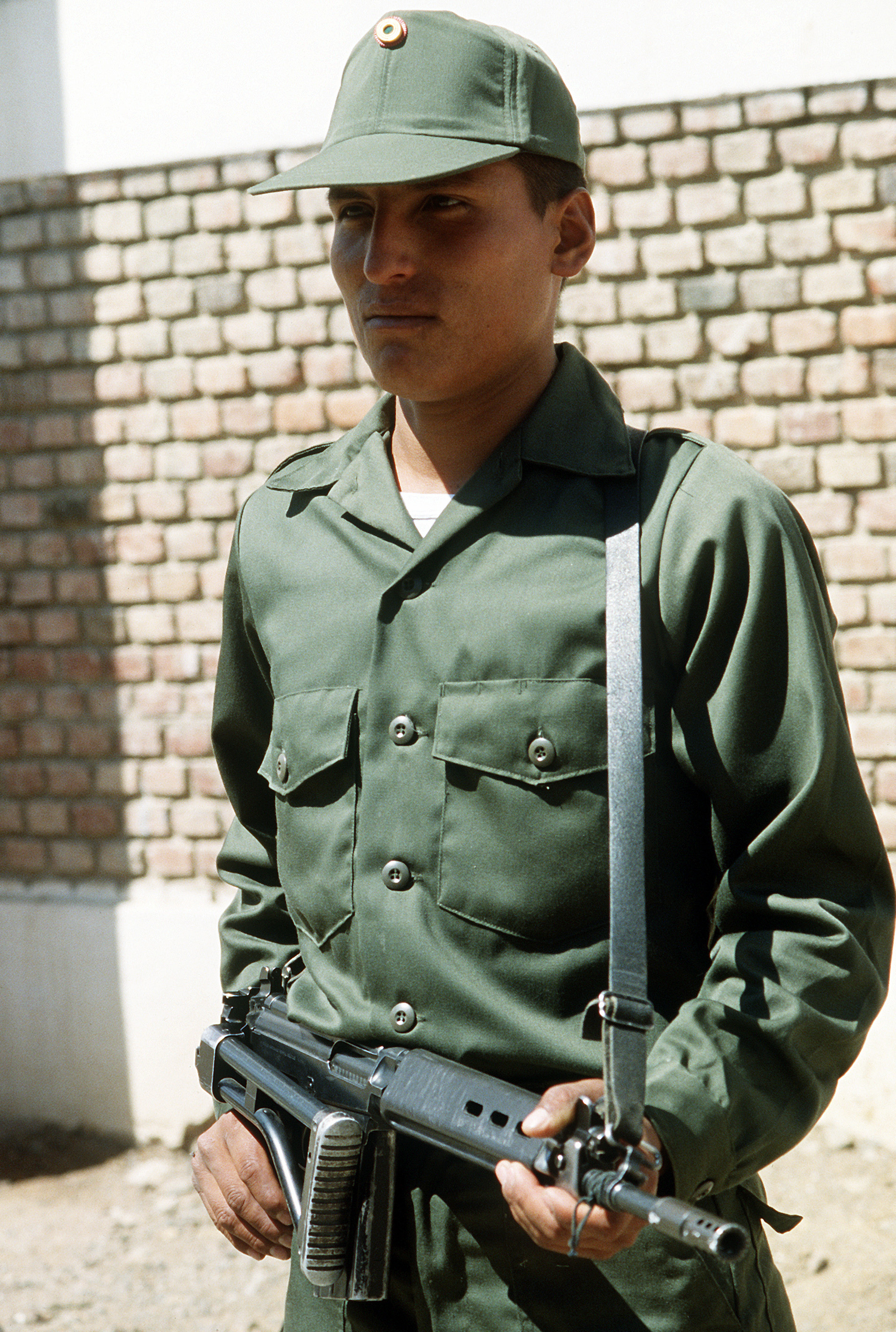
A Bolivian Army soldier wearing the Type III OG-107 armed with a 7.62mm FN FAL rifle stands guard during Fuerzas Unidas Bolivia, a joint U.S. and Bolivian training exercise in April 1986.

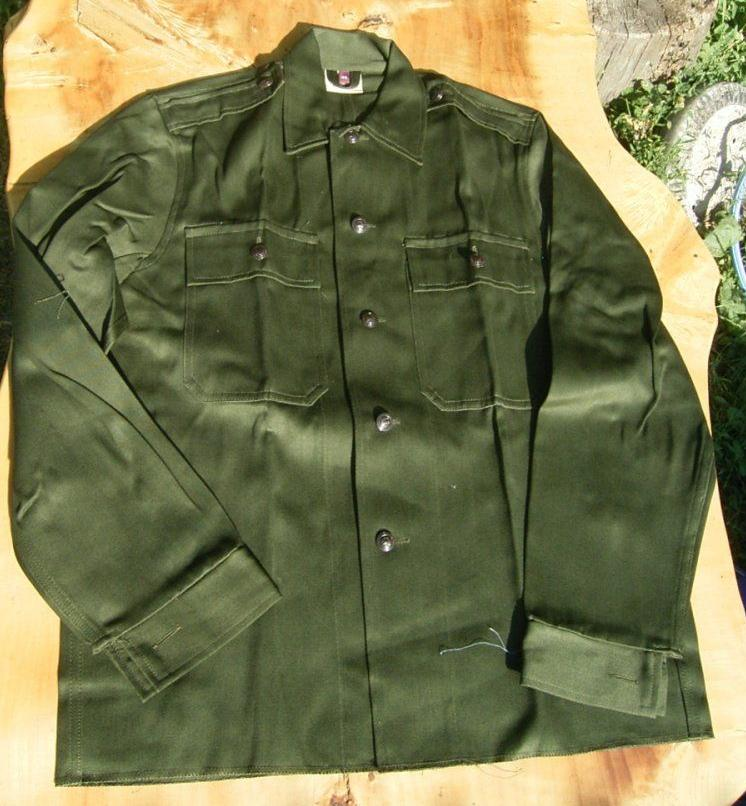
Hungarian People's Army M1965 fatigue jacket.

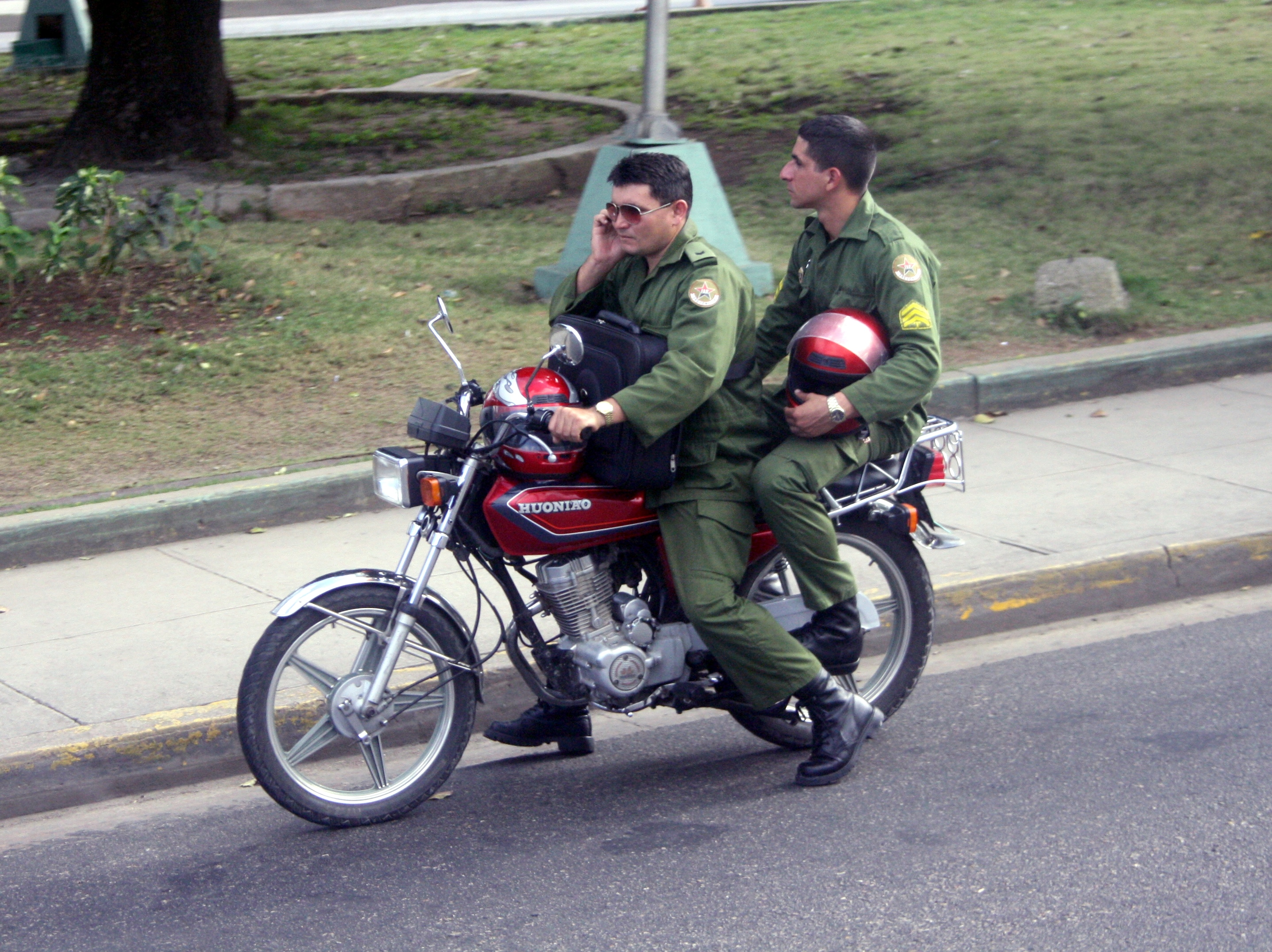
Cuban soldiers wearing domestic-made OG-107.

- Brazil
- Bolivia
- Costa Rica
- Cuba: After the Cuban Revolution, the FAR continued wearing the same uniforms.
- Colombia: Used OG-107 in Olive Drab and later a domestic variant with Tigrillo (Oncilla) camouflage, U.S M1942 frog skin copy. Replaced by BDU in 1991-93
- Egypt
- Hungary: Wears a copy.
- Iran: Manufactured and wore all three types plus modifications and camouflaged variants.
- Iraq
- Israel: During the Yom Kippur War, the US delivered weapons and supplies to the IDF, among which were sets of OG-107s, later modified by the IDF to have shoulder straps.
- Japan: Produced domestic variants of the Tropical Combat Uniform that were manufactured in JGSDF Type 1 "Kunai" camouflage.
- Jordan
- Kingdom of Laos: During the Laotian Civil War, OG-107s were worn by Royal Laos Army.
- Kuwait
- Lebanon: Had a special domestic variant of the OG-107 worn by the Lebanese Armed Forces and Internal Security Forces during the Lebanese Civil War; replaced by the U.S. Woodland Battle Dress Uniform (BDU) in 1983-84.
- Morocco
- Myanmar
- Philippines: Used by the Armed Forces of the Philippines
- Nicaragua: Worn first by the National Guard of Nicaragua and after 1979 by the EPS.
- Panama: Worn first by the National Guard of Panama and after 1979 by the PDF.
- Saudi Arabia

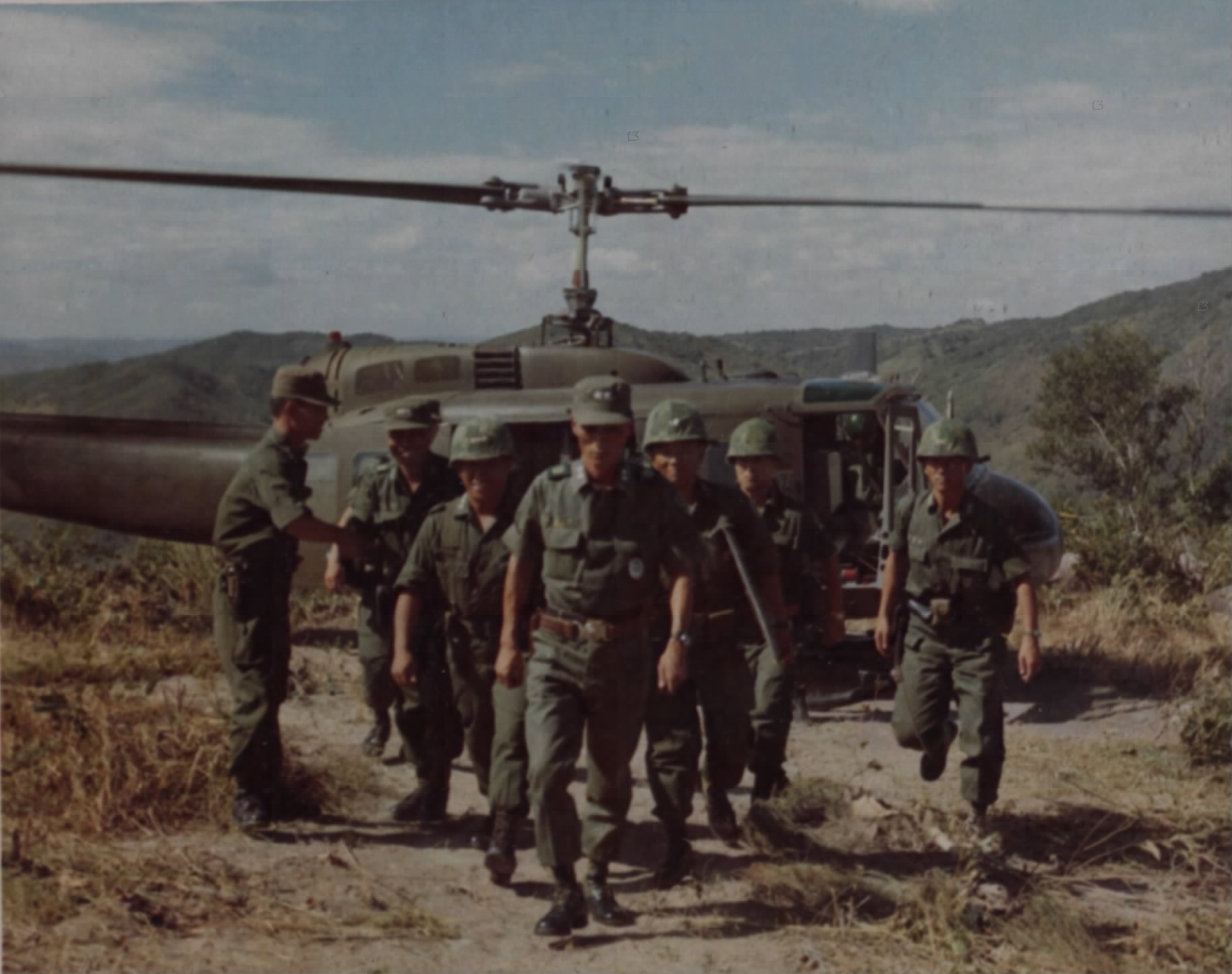
ROK Army officers wearing OG-107's in Vietnam 1968.

- South Korea: Had a special domestic HBT variant of the OG-107 worn during the Vietnam War. Replaced by American-made BDUs beginning in the late 1980s.
- Syria
- Taiwan
- Thailand: Formerly used by the Thai Armed Forces.
- United States: Replaced by the BDU. Limited uses by State Defense Forces for training purposes.
- Peru: Used by the Peruvian Army, adopted in 1965, worn during the Internal conflict in Peru and replaced by the BDU
- Uruguay: Uruguayan Air Force uniforms worn until the mid-90s when it was changed to the BDU.
- South Vietnam: Worn by the South Vietnamese Armed Forces.

== See also ==
- M1951 Field Cap and Ridgeway Cap
- M-1951 field jacket
- M-1965 field jacket
- Feldgrau
- Headgear of the United States Army
