= Herringbone (cloth) =

Pattern used in weaving fabric

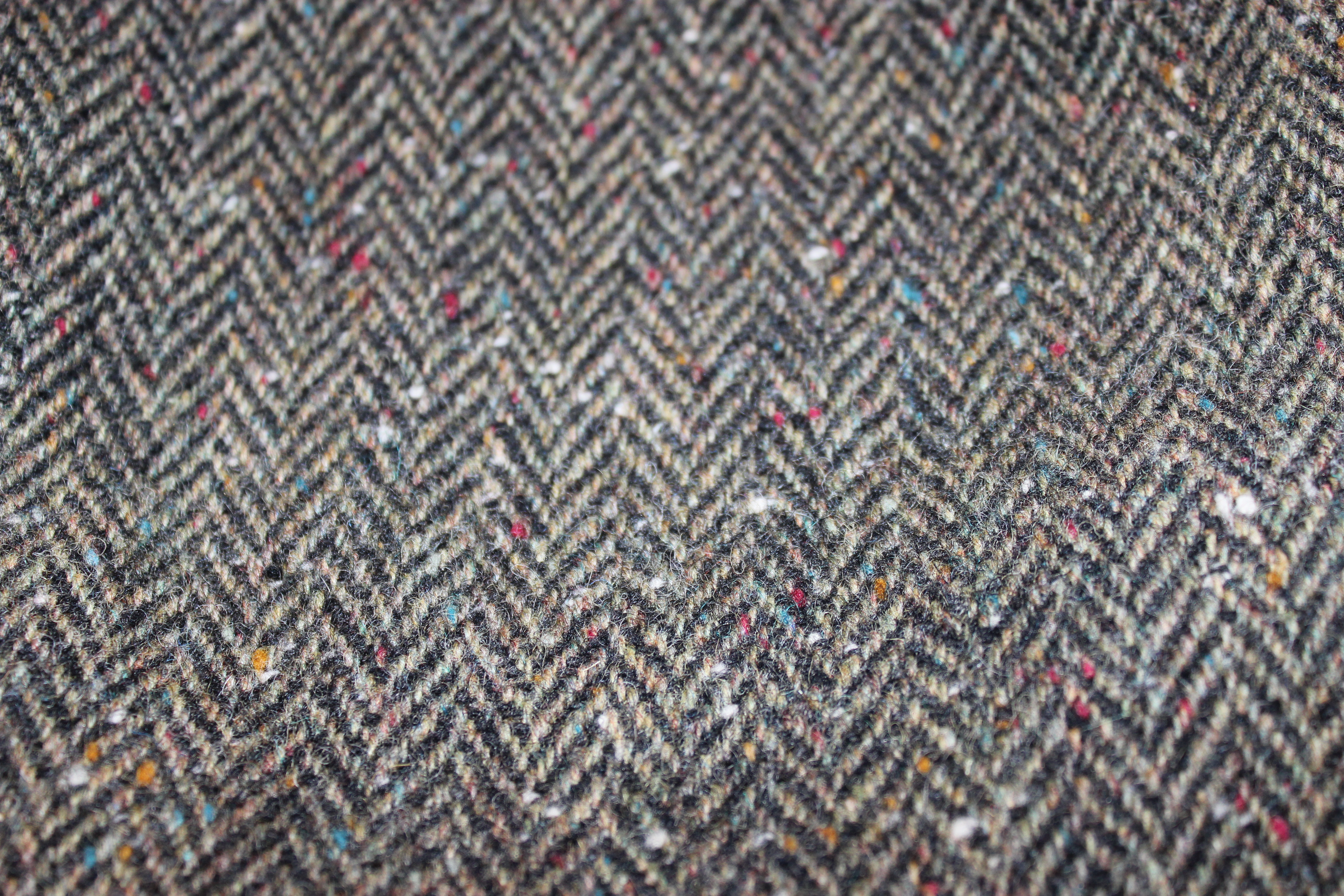
Donegal tweed (an example of herringbone)

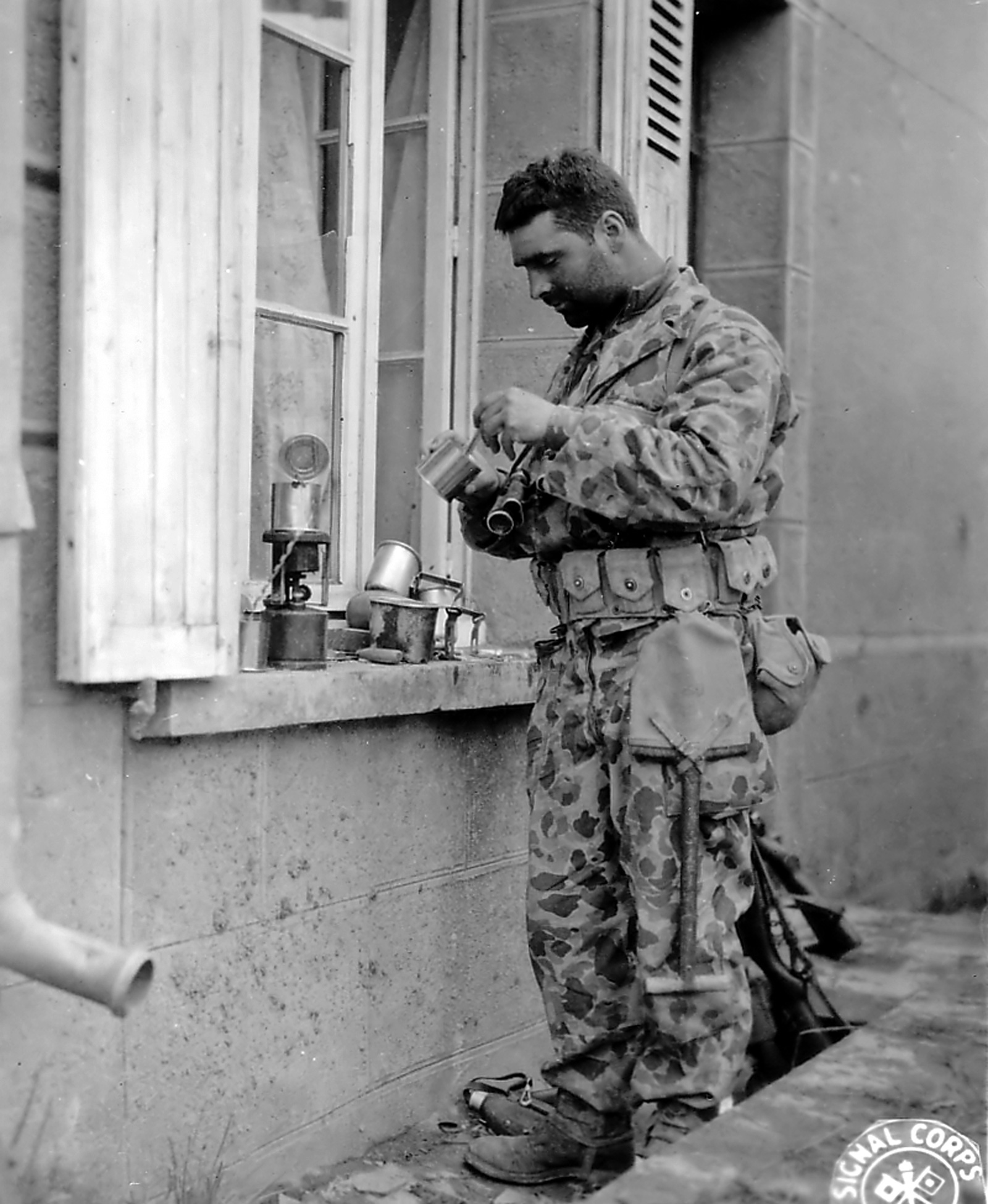
Reversible camouflage HBTs

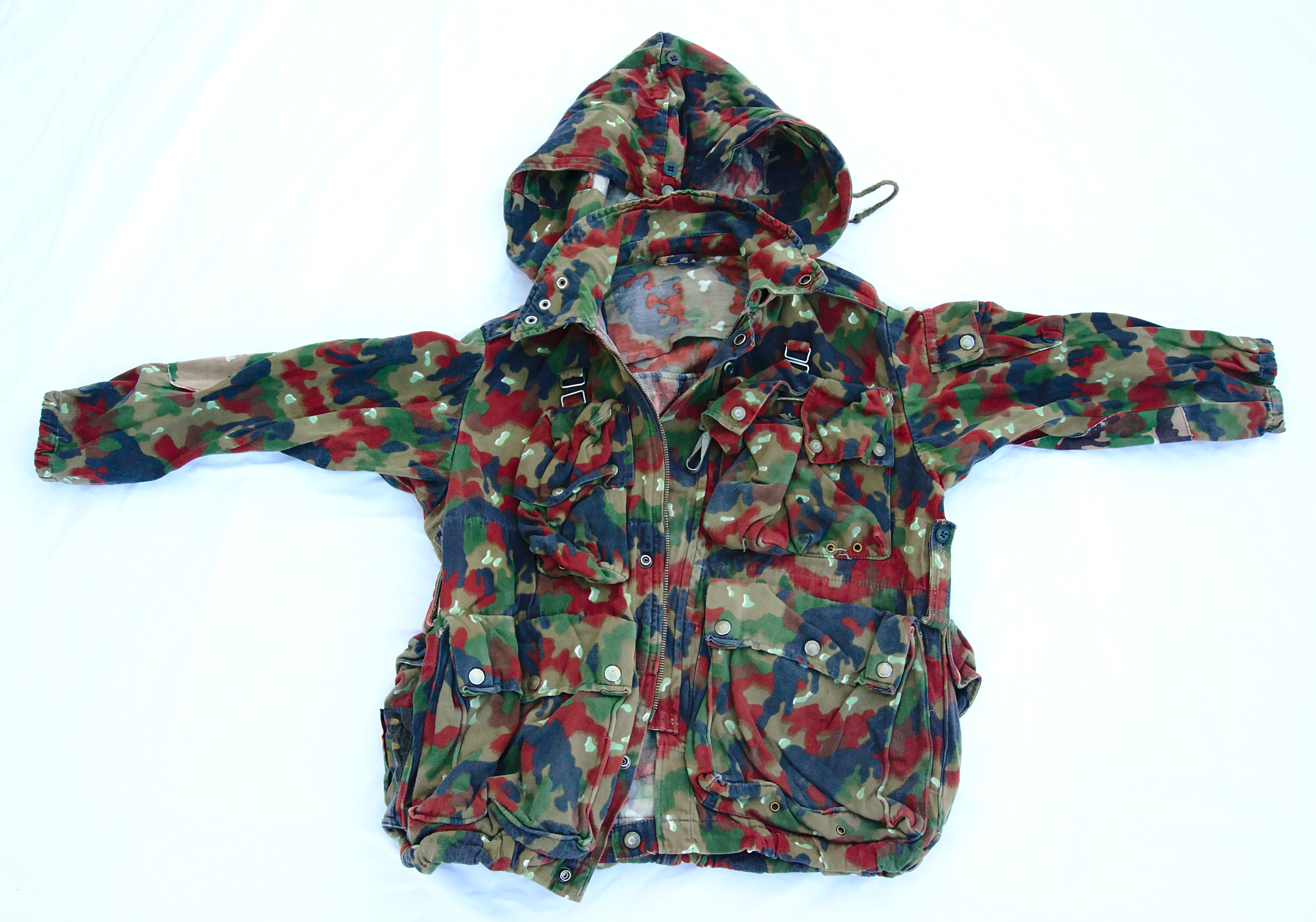
The Swiss Kampfanzug 57/70 field uniform was made from a twill material

Herringbone, also called broken twill weave, describes a distinctive V-shaped weaving pattern usually found in twill fabric. It is distinguished from a plain chevron by the break at reversal, which makes it resemble a broken zigzag. The pattern is called herringbone because it resembles the skeleton of a herring fish. Herringbone-patterned fabric is usually wool, and is one of the most popular cloths used for suits and outerwear. Tweed cloth is often woven with a herringbone pattern.

Fatigue uniforms made from cotton in this weave were used by several militaries during and after World War II; in US use, they were often called HBTs.

== History ==
Various herringbone weaves have been found in antiquity:

- A pair of woolen leggings found in the permafrost of the Italian-Austrian Alps have a 2:2 herringbone weave, dating to 800 to 500 BC.
- A dark blue cloth with a 2:2 herringbone weave was found at Murabba'at Cave in Israel, from the Roman period.
- A textile with a 2:2 herringbone weave was found at Pompeii, from 79 AD.
- An illustration of a cloth having a herringbone weave from Antinoöpolis in Greece from 130 AD.
- The Falkirk Tartan, a wool 2:2 herringbone tartan from around 240 AD.
- Similar fabric fragments found at Vindolanda, south of Hadrian's Wall in England.

== See also ==
- Drill (fabric)
- Herringbone pattern
- Moleskin
