= Jump boot =

Combat boot for paratroopers

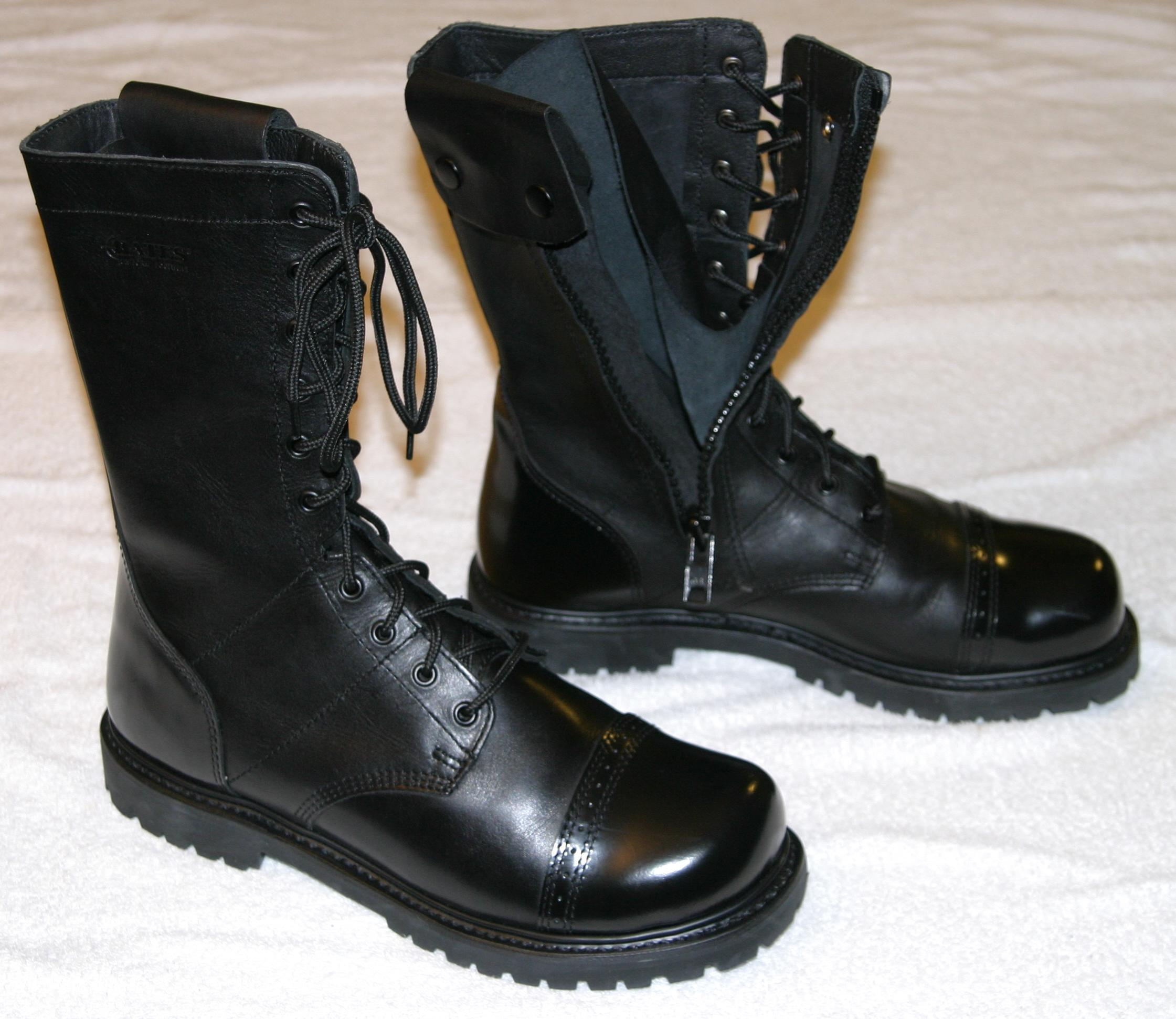
Bates Enforcer Series 11" side zip Paratrooper Jump Boots

Jump boots are combat boots designed for paratroopers, featuring calf-length lacing and rigid toe caps. They were invented in Germany as Springerstiefel around 1935. The style was developed in many countries simultaneously with the adoption of airborne infantry forces during World War II. Jump boots are earned through paratrooper training, and thus have become a mark of achievement and distinction, mainly worn as dress and parade boots.

Jump boot uppers are generally made of smooth black leather with toe-caps and heel counters that accept a high polish ("spit-shine" or "spittle-shine"). It is also a tradition among some paratroopers to lace jump boots in a lattice or cobweb style which increases ankle support during a parachute jump.

== Description ==
Although there is considerable variation in the features of modern jump boots, an example of the defining characteristics can be found in the US M1942 "Boots, Parachute Jumper" (as popularized by the Corcoran Boot Company during World War II) are extended lacing from the instep to the calf and rigid, reinforced toe caps; these features were intended to give greater support to the wearer's ankles and toes during the rough landings routinely experienced by paratroopers. The most common US combat boots of the World War II era (the M1939 "Shoes, Service, Composition Sole") had non-reinforced uppers and only laced to just above the ankle, requiring the use of separate leggings or puttees to provide support and prevent mud and dirt from entering the boot. Although less flexible than the lighter standard issue boot—and therefore often less comfortable when marching, especially when cold or not well broken in—such specially reinforced footwear was seen as a practical necessity, as upwards of 30% of paratroopers were expected to suffer lower extremity injuries during a combat jump. Leggings were also considered to present a risk of entanglement with parachute risers.

== Users ==
=== Germany ===
During World War II, the Fallschirmjäger wore jump boots with side lacing. Side laced boots were also used by Czechoslovak Paratroopers after 1945.

=== Brazil ===
Brazilian Paratroopers wear brown leather jump boots manufactured by Atalaia.

=== Netherlands ===
Dutch soldiers were issued the M57 Jump Boot from 1958 to 1976. They were a dark brown leather and had stitched soles.

=== Portugal ===
Jump Boots in Portugal are manufactured by Proheral and are laced in the aforementioned distinctive style. While these boots are sometimes worn by non-paratroopers in Portugal, only paratroopers wear them with surplus green paracord instead of the usual black lace. On parade, they are usually worn with white paracord.

=== Spain ===
In Spain they are referred to as BRIPAC boots (Spanish: BOTAS MARCA IMEPIEL, DE LA BRIPAC) They lack the triple buckles which are worn by other soldiers for safety reasons, as a parachute could get dangerously hooked on them. They are also slightly higher, providing more shin, ankle, and foot support, and have reinforced toes and heels.

=== Italy ===
Italian Paratroopers are issued the stivaletti combattimento esercito italiano mod. 2000. These usually come in a dark brown/black leather and soles may vary. French paratroopers of the 1950s worn the very similar "Bottes de saut Mle 50". The only differences between the Italian and French models are the heel and in the outsole tread patterns.

=== United Kingdom ===
During World War II, the British Army issued trial copies of Fallschirmjäger-type side laced boots in the early days of the Parachute Regiment, but they were not adopted. A high version of the standard ammunition boot was trialled with an extra cuff with eyelets added to the top of the boot. They were also fitted with thick crepe rubber soles. Once again, though trialled, they were not adopted.

=== United States ===
William P. Yarborough initially designed the boots in 1941, as a test officer in the 501st Parachute Infantry Battalion / Provisional Parachute Group. They are also known as paratrooper boots, or "Corcorans," after the J. F. Corcoran Shoe Company, one of their manufacturers. Jump boots with zippers were not authorized for wear by U.S. forces. Certain U.S. Army soldiers, notably those parachute-qualified and assigned to an airborne or special forces unit, are authorized to wear jump boots with their dress uniforms.

A modified version of the paratrooper boot was issued to U.S. Navy personnel working on flight decks, and aircrewmen. This variation of the jump boot featured a steel toe and a zig-zag pattern on the outsole designed to prevent gathering FOD, or Foreign Object Damage, that could potentially damage aircraft by being sucked into the jet engine's intake. These boots were sometimes colloquially referred to as "wing-walkers." Generally, they were black in color, but a brown version was issued to Flight Officers. This style is no longer issued, but is still generally authorized to wear with most Navy working uniforms (i.e. NWUs, coveralls, Aviation Working Greens). Wing-walkers became popularly known when their characteristic footprints were linked to the Zodiac Killer.

== See also ==
- List of boots
- List of shoe styles
