= M1941 field jacket =

US Army field jacket issued 1941–1943

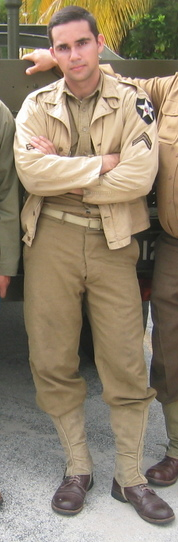
A reenactor wears a modern-day reproduction of the famed field jacket.

The M1941 field jacket, officially designated Jacket, Field, O.D. (for olive drab) and also unofficially known as the O.D. cotton field jacket, or M-41, is a military jacket that was used by US Army soldiers, most famously during the beginning of World War II. In 1941 it started to be phased in as a field replacement for the wool four-pocket service coat (which was relegated to garrison semi-dress use), but around 1943 it was replaced in turn by the improved M1943 model. Owing to wide adoption, the M1941 is usually recognized as a symbol of the World War II American G.I. The jacket was made in a light shade of olive drab called O.D. number 2.

== First field jacket ==
Through World War I, soldiers in the United States Army wore a semi-tailored wool four-pocket field garment. By the outbreak of World War II, the Army still issued a somewhat tight-fitting version suitable only for garrison wear. This followed the general pattern adopted by most major armies of the world during the post-WWI period, with a dual dress and combat purpose, but proved to be impractical in combat conditions. At the end of the 1930s, the Army moved to adopt modify the coat, with changes intending to make it more utilitarian and provide better protection in combat. The army's first attempts included adding a pleated "bi-swing" back to the service coat, a change adopted with the M1939 Service Coat, but that proved to be still unsuited for field wear and was relegated to garrison use.

The first field jacket developed for the Army was based on a civilian jacket suggested by Major General James K. Parsons, for whom it was unofficially named. Unlike the service coat, the material for the jacket was more wind and water resistant. A further reason for adopting a field jacket made of a different material was that shortages of wool were expected. The jacket could be worn with both winter (OD wool) and summer (khaki chino) uniforms as well as fatigue uniforms. The Olive Drab Cotton Field Jacket was standardized and adopted in June 1940 for use by all members of the US Army for wear with both the winter and summer service uniforms. The design was slightly altered in 1941 to add epaulettes and remove the pocket flaps, as well as a slightly heavier weight wool lining. Jackets of similar design, such as the N-4, were later also adopted by the Navy and Marine Corps.

== Design ==
The jacket was modeled after a civilian windbreaker design, and was constructed of an olive drab shade 2 cotton poplin outer shell with a dark olive drab blanket wool flannel lining, with shell color on new jackets was a pale pea-green color, but this faded fairly quickly with heavy use and sun exposure to the more common beige-green. The jacket had a front zipper front closure with a buttoned storm flap. The jacket also had a button and extension neckband with a buttonhole at the collar for closing the lapels to warm the neck region, as well as buttoned adjusting tabs on each side of the waist and at the cuffs to seal in body heat, and buttoned shoulder epaulets. There were two front slash pockets and a notched lapel collar. Earlier models of the jacket (generally known as the Parsons jacket by collectors) do not have the shoulder epaulets, but the two front slash pockets had buttoned pocket flaps and a thinner half-belt back seam.

== World War II ==
When the US entered the war in 1941, the O.D. cotton field jacket was the standard outer garment for all army personnel, except those that had other specialist clothing (Paratroopers wore the parachutist's coat and trousers, tank crews wore the tanker's jacket, various types of parkas were worn in cold weather, etc.). As a result, the field jacket could be seen worn in every theater of war and by nearly every type of soldier, making it a rather ubiquitous symbol of the World War II American G.I.

Throughout the course of the war, the O.D. cotton field jacket proved to be an inadequate outer garment. The jacket's thin lining provided poor insulation during cold weather and the light cotton shell provided little protection from wet weather and wind. In addition, the lighter shade of OD 3 faded quickly and resulted in a beige color, thus compromising the effect of camouflage – which troops in the field found out the hard way, and often turned their jackets inside out because the wool lining was a darker shade of O.D. and did not gleam in the sunlight like the poplin shell did.

The O.D. cotton field jacket was officially replaced with the adoption of the M1943 uniform ensemble as the standard, which included the much improved M1943 field jacket. The O.D. cotton field jacket was redesignated limited standard and issued until supplies were exhausted. Photographic evidence shows that soldiers continued to wear the older jacket all the way through the end of the war, due to supply shortages and squabbling between the Quartermaster Corps and field commanders, who all had their own ideas of what the troops should "look like". The jackets even were used in limited amounts during the Korean War.

== Arctic field jacket ==
The arctic field jacket is a lesser known variant of the standard M1941 field jacket. Its main differences were that it was made with a more water resistant fabric and had buckles for tightening around the wrists and waist instead of buttons. It also was longer, coming down to above the knee as compared to the M41's waist length fit.

== See also ==
- United States Army uniforms in World War II
