= Sateen =

Fabric

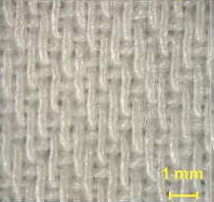
Sateen in a 6-harness satin weave, lyocell

Sateen refers to a fabric made using a satin weave structure but with spun yarn instead of filament yarn.

The dense weave, sheen, and softer feel of sateen are produced through the satin weave structure. Standard plain weaves use a one-over, one-under structure. For a satin weave, warp yarns are floated over weft yarns, for example four over and one under (for a five-harness satin weave). In a weft-faced satin or sateen, the weft yarns are floated over the warp yarns. This weave structure is prone to fraying and is less durable than plain weave fabrics.

Some sateen is mercerized, a chemical process that makes fibers softer, smoother, water resistant, and more resilient.

== Care ==
Unlike its silk counterpart, cotton sateen is easy to maintain since it is machine washable. It can also be air dried or tumble dried with minimal to moderate shrinkage. Sateen can wrinkle, but wrinkles can be ironed out easily using the cotton setting of an iron. For garments made of sateen, follow the recommended laundering instructions.

== Uses ==
Sateen comes in a variety of colors and weights. It has a variety of uses, from bedsheets to drapery lining and other home decor, to clothing such as dresses, skirts, jackets, and more. In the use of jackets, if tightly woven, it has proven more rain and wind resistant than plain weave.

Some manufacturers claim that sateen, due to its tight weave, is stronger than plain woven cotton.

== See also ==
- Percale – A plain weave
- Satinet – Another satin-like weave
- Twill – A different weave
