= Desert Night Camouflage =

Grid camouflage pattern

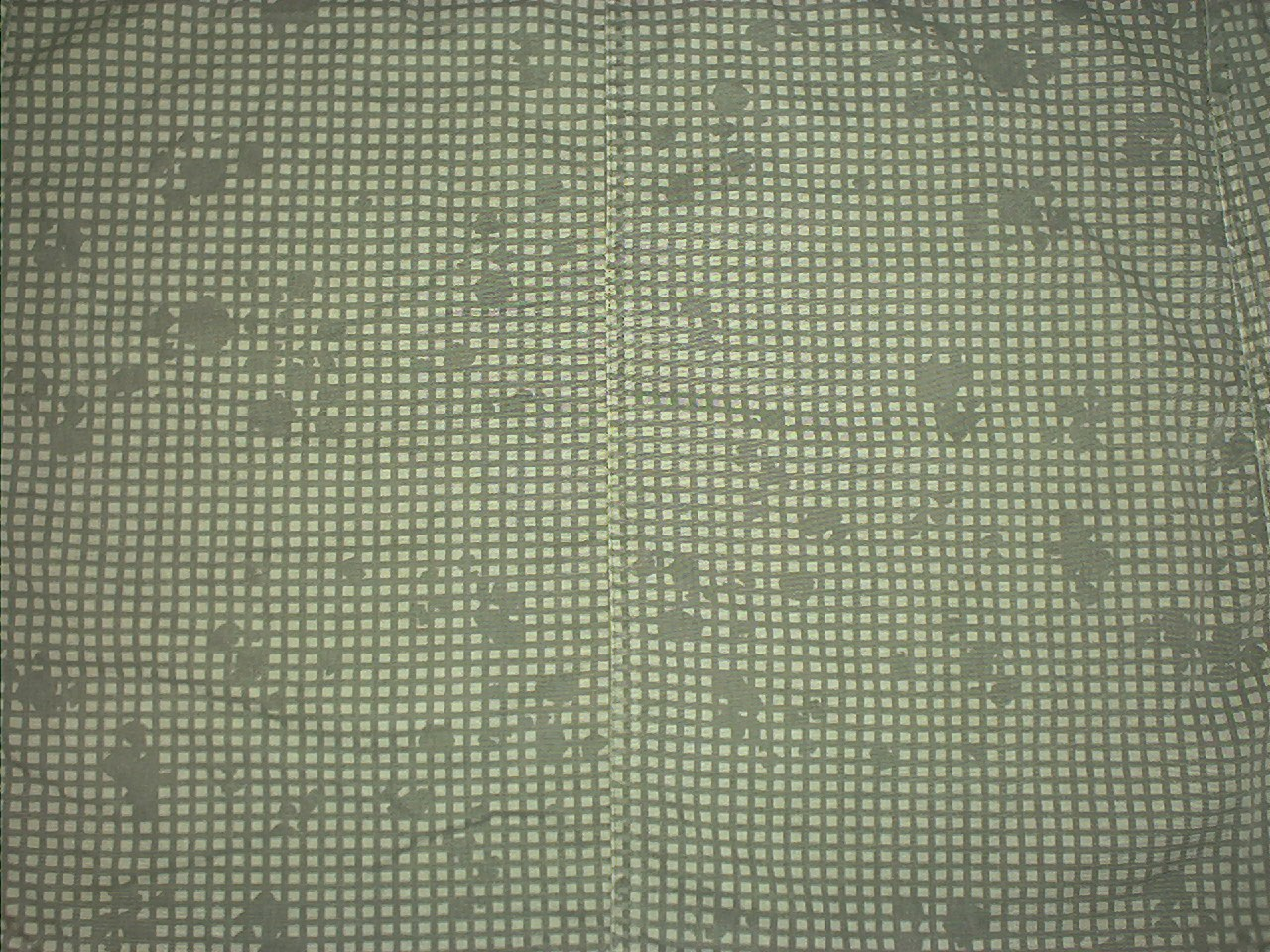
- Fabric sample of the DNC
- Type: Military camouflage pattern
- Place of origin: United States

Service history
- Used by: See Users
- Wars: Gulf War

The Desert Night Camouflage pattern is a two-color grid camouflage pattern used by the United States military during the First Gulf War. It was designed to aid soldiers in concealment from Soviet-based night vision devices (NVDs). The pattern is now considered obsolete due to the increase in capability of foreign night vision devices.

Even with the pattern being obsolete, it has gained interest due to its unusual look.

== History ==
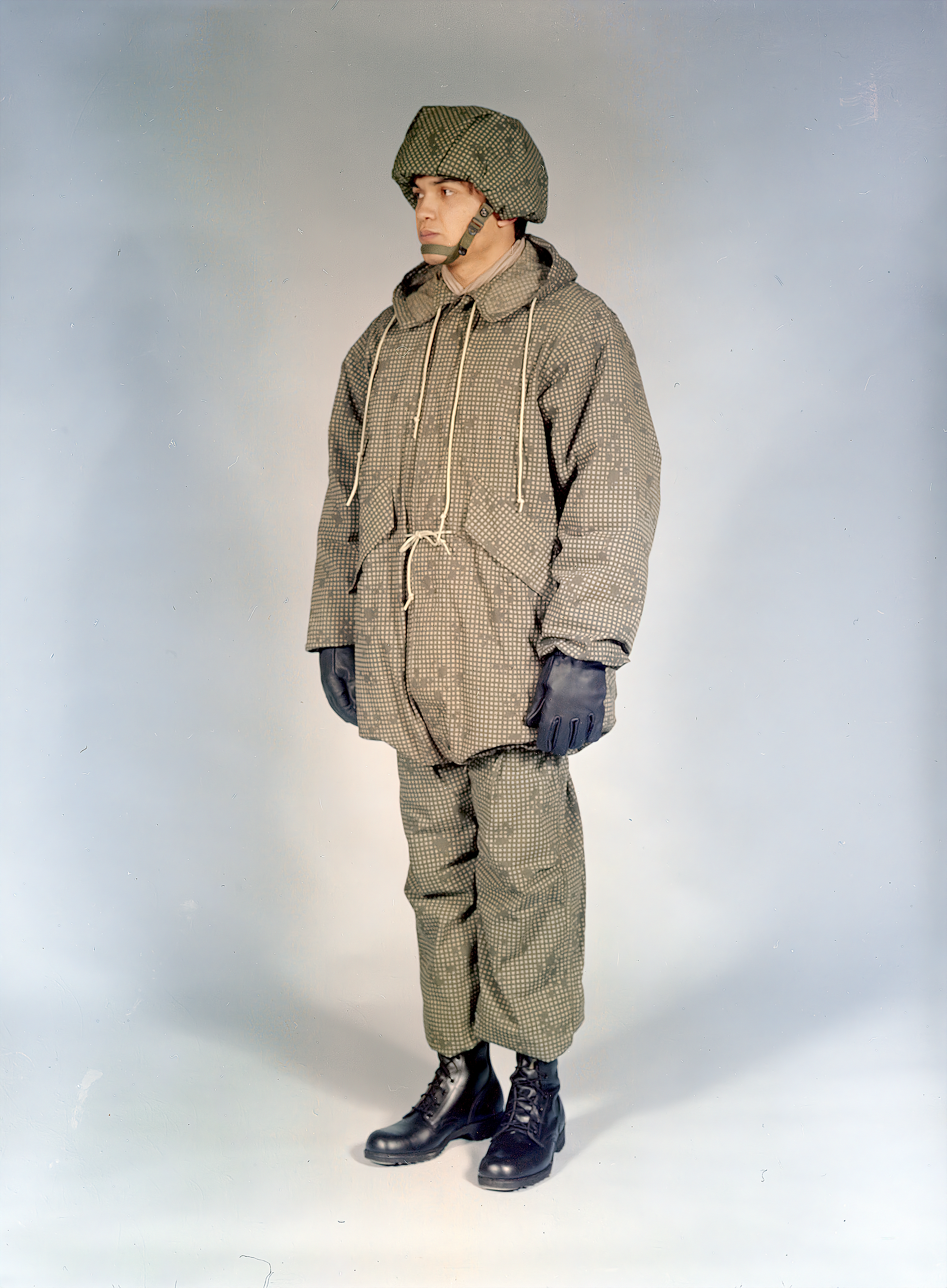
DNC experimental helmet cover and set of parka and trousers, 1978

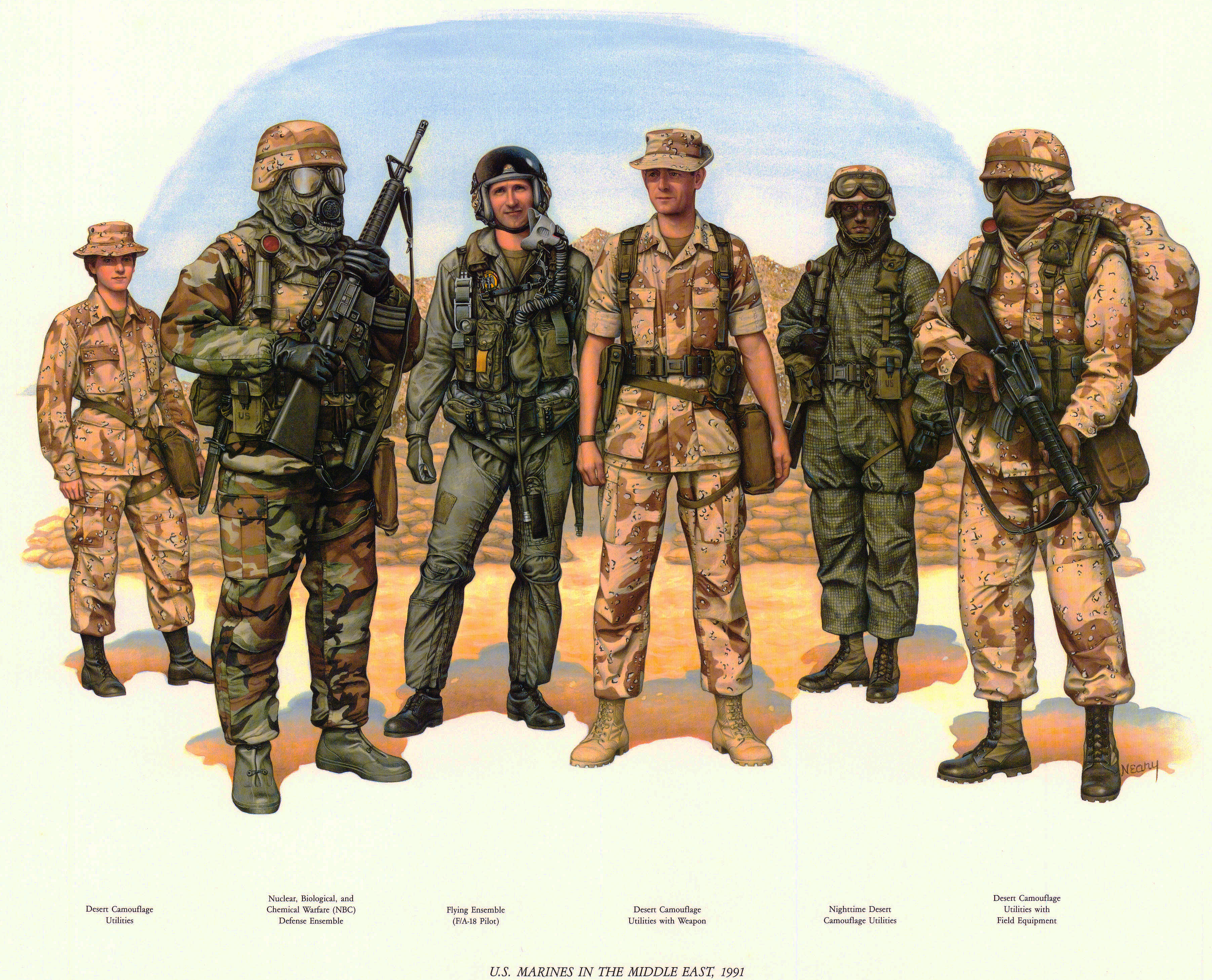
A US Marine in DNC (second from the right) in an illustration of Marine field dresses during the Persian Gulf War

The earliest photos of this camouflage pattern are dated to 1972, and field tests occurred in 1976. Distribution of garments in the Desert Night pattern started in 1981, however, was in limited numbers.

During the Persian Gulf War, clothing sets in this pattern were issued in wider numbers to US soldiers and marines. Sets of parkas and trousers were intended to be worn over the issued six-color Desert Battle Dress Uniform during nighttime operations.

No replacement for a night-specific desert pattern has been created, as advancements in infrared reflectance technology in the immediate replacement Desert Camouflage Uniform (1991), and later, the Marine Corps Combat Utility Uniform (2002) and Army Combat Uniform (2005) have eliminated the need for a separate nighttime overgarment.

== Design ==
A ground shade of Light Green 426 and a grid and rubble print of Dark Green 425 make up the pattern's colors. The DNC design was made from cross hatches and blotches, which was supposed to break up the wearer's image when looked at through various NVDs.

The clothing set was made for a parka and overpants. The parka's design was generally based around that of the M1951 "fishtail" parka, and that of overwhite garments.

Additionally, items such as commercially-produced Battle Dress Uniforms, M-65 field jackets, boonie hats, and patrol caps have historically been available on the civilian market.

== Criticism ==
During the Gulf War, one scout/sniper section of a Marine Corps battalion conducted a night test comparing the visibility of the desert night camouflage clothing with six-color desert uniforms and winter overwhites. The night camouflage clothing was less effective than both the day desert uniforms and winter overwhites when viewed through an AN/PVS-5 night vision device.

The pattern was seen as effective on NVDs that were made in the 1970s.

== Users ==
- United Kingdom: Used by UK special forces.
- United States: Used by US troops. Also used by US special forces units.

== See also ==
- US Woodland pattern
- Six-color desert camouflage
- Three-color desert camouflage

=== Warsaw pact equivalents ===
- KLMK, Soviet camouflage oversuit
- Strichtarn, East German 2-color camouflage

== Bibliography ==
- Dougherty, Martin (2017). Camouflage at War: An Illustrated Guide from 1914 to the Present Day. London, UK: Amber Books. ISBN 978-1782744986.
