= Battle Dress Uniform =

Fatigues used by the US Armed Forces from early 1980s to mid-2000s

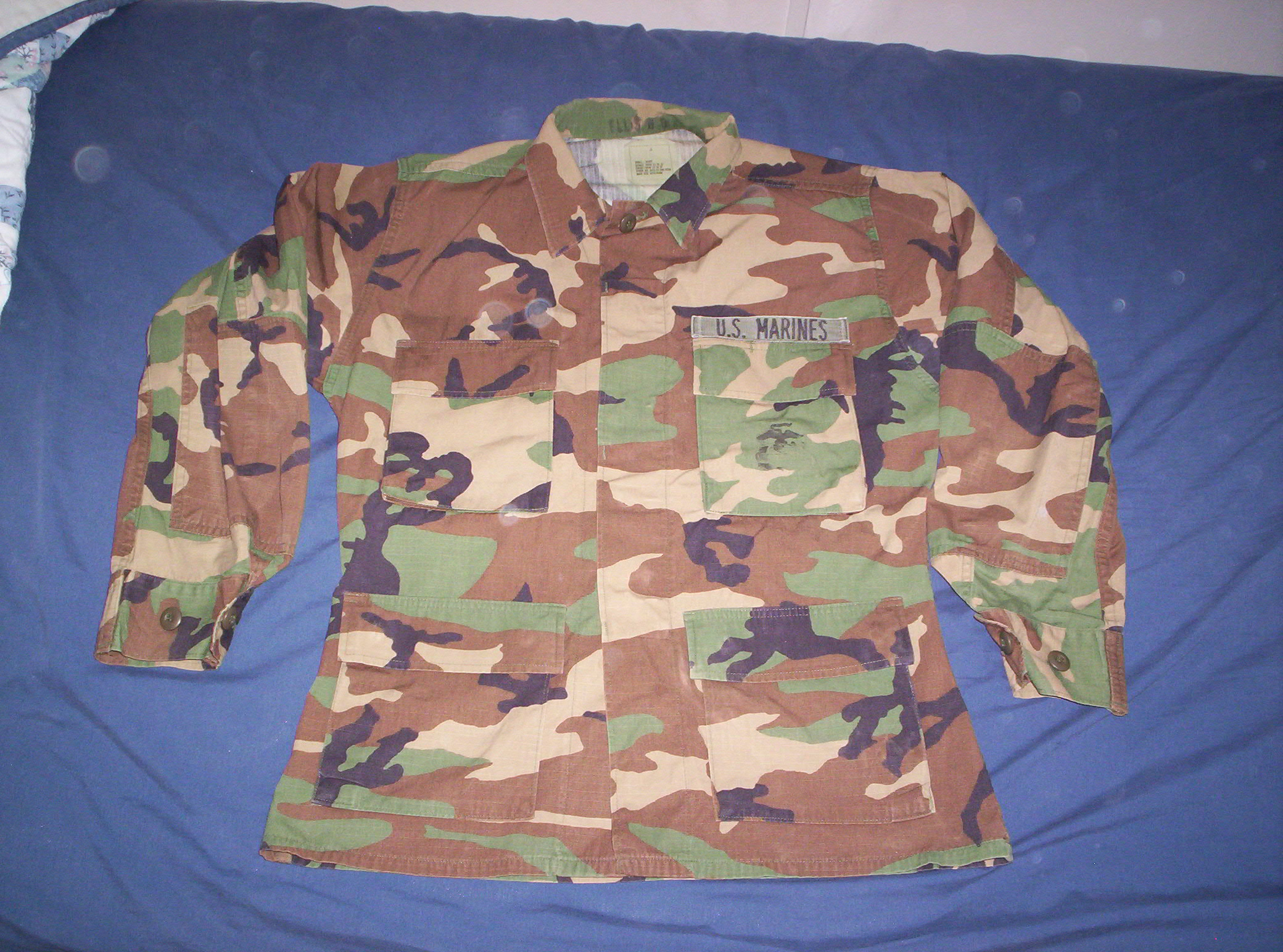
- U.S. Marine Corps BDU blouse in woodland pattern, wearer's nametape removed.
- Type: Combat uniform
- Place of origin: United States

Service history
- In service: 1981–2008 (U.S. Army) 1981-2011 (U.S. Air Force); 1981–2005 (U.S. Marine Corps)
- Wars: Cold War; Yugoslav Wars; Global War on Terrorism

Production history
- Designed: 1979
- Unit cost: $50 (MSRP in February 2001)
- Produced: 1981–2012
- Variants: Desert Camouflage Uniform, Desert Battle Dress Uniform

The Battle Dress Uniform (BDU) is a camouflaged combat uniform that was used by the United States Armed Forces as their standard combat uniform from the early 1980s to the mid-2000s. Since then, it has been replaced or supplanted in every branch of the U.S. Armed Forces.

BDU-style uniforms and derivatives still see widespread use in other countries (some of them being former U.S. surplus stocks transferred under U.S. security assistance programs), while others are still worn by some U.S. federal, state, and local law enforcement agents who may work in tactical situations, such as the DEA RRT and SWAT teams. The uniforms are also used by urban search and rescue groups such as FEMA USAR task force teams and firefighting agencies when conducting technical rescues or other special operations.

== History ==
=== Initial proposal and early use ===
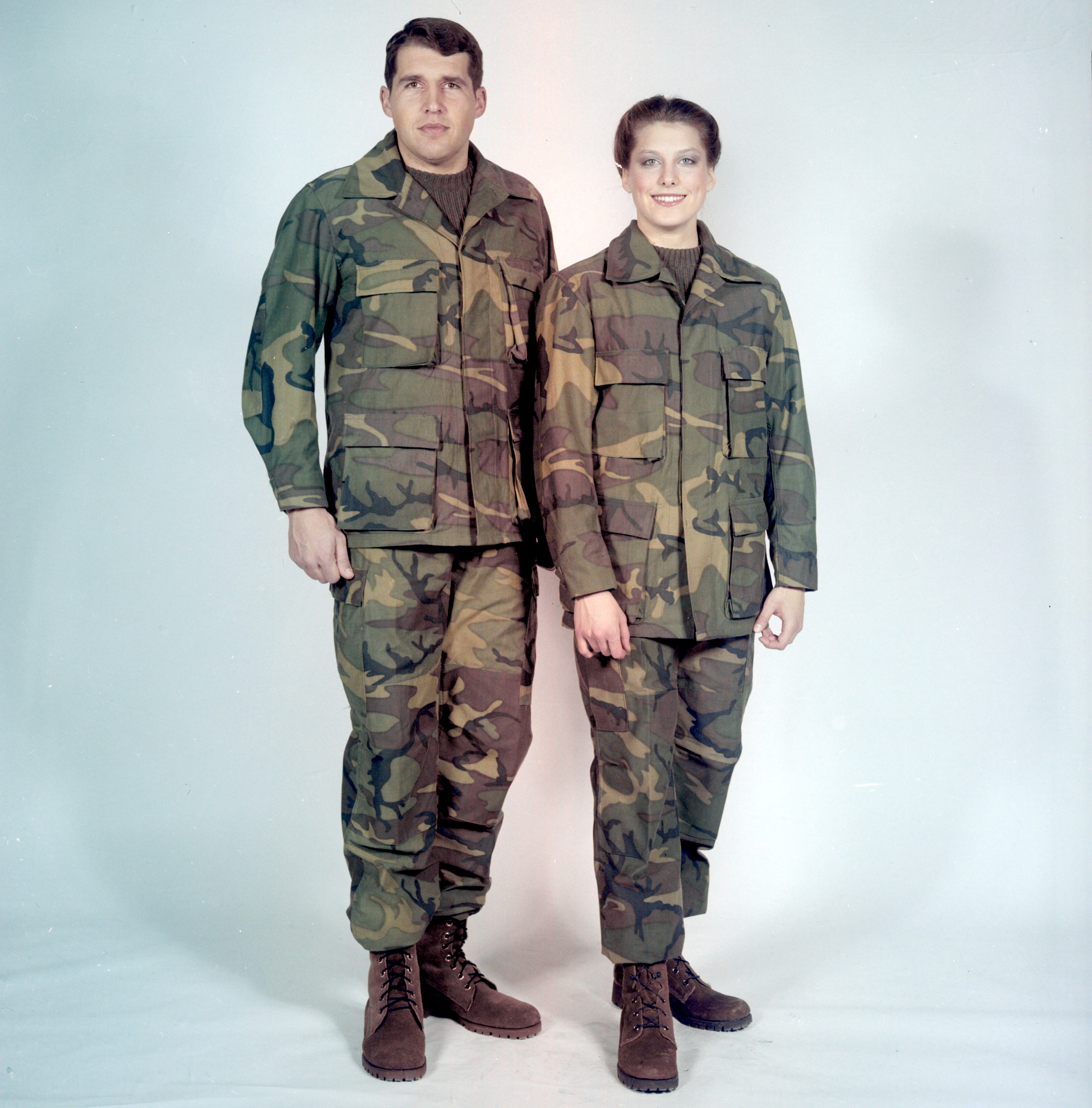
A man and woman modelling early prototypes of the BDU in 1980

The Directorate of Combat Developments of the Infantry School – responsible for the doctrine behind individual clothing and equipment for infantry – and the Natick Research and Development Command – responsible for materiel development – worked together to present a requirement document for a camouflaged field uniform system to the Department of the Army. The uniform had a 50% cotton and 50% nylon twill material in a woodland-color camouflage pattern with reinforced knees, elbows, and seat. It was to be supplemented with additional standard items such as field jackets, over-trousers, ponchos, and parkas – printed over in the same camouflage pattern – to provide environmental protection in different climates. The BDU was issued with the newly-designed Personnel Armor System for Ground Troops (PASGT). The document was approved on 25 June 1979, and the Army subsequently approved the proposed field camouflage uniform for final development and field use – the latter of which was scheduled to begin in August 1981.

All United States Army soldiers formally received their first batches of the BDU as its new field and garrison uniform in the temperate weight cut on October 1, 1981. Sporadic reports of excessive shrinkage when laundering arose the following month, but it was deemed "manageable" because the uniform shrank by only 2 to 3 percent (one inch) during laundering, and that the rate of returns from excessive shrinkage were only 0.2 percent. A major factor was determined to be the temperatures used in laundering, which was fixed by issuing comprehensive care instructions to soldiers and government laundries.

During the 1983 invasion of Grenada, deployed troops complained that the current BDUs were too heavy for tropical environments, and some troops were reported to have heat sickness due to the heavy uniforms. In response, several thousand sets of Vietnam-era field uniforms were rushed to Grenada. The Army began evaluating a tropical-weight variant of the BDU by March 1984, and a spokesperson said BDU variant would be ready for distribution in the next year if it passed testing. The Army also planned to eventually provide four sets of BDUs to all active and reserve soldiers.

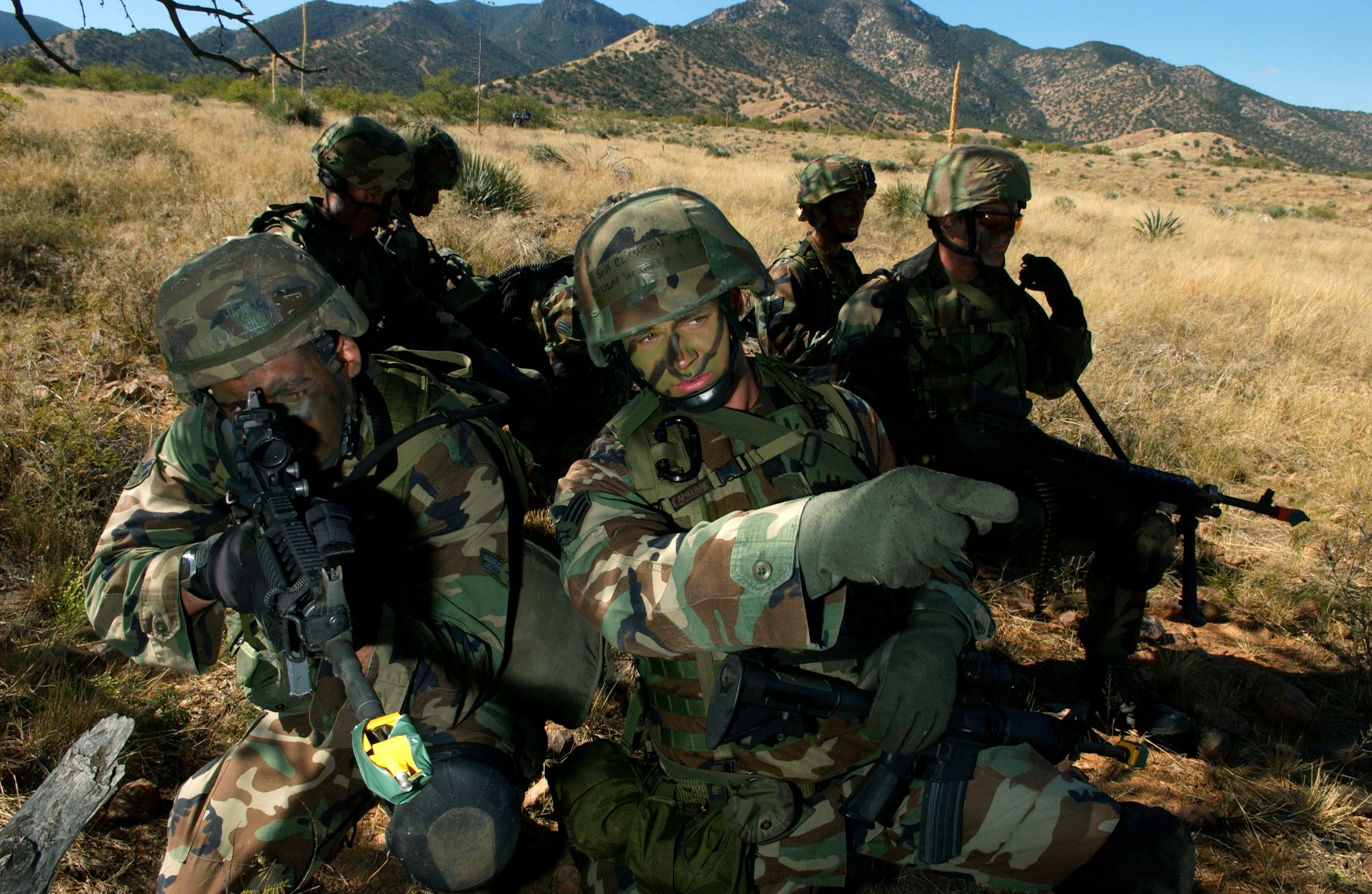
US Air Force Security troops training in Fort Huachuca, Arizona, preparing for the 2004 Defender Challenge competition

Criticism from some United States Congress members and negative feedback from soldiers prompted the Army to evaluate at least nine modifications to the BDU, including those determining its fit, accessibility, and appearance, such as redesigned pockets and smaller collars.

=== U.S. Marine Corps ===
Originally, no nametapes were worn with the USMC's BDUs, which was officially referred to by the USMC as a "camouflage utility uniform" (CUU) during its usage. However, in October 1991, the USMC began the wearing of nametapes on their BDUs (and DCUs and DBDUs) in order to comply with NATO Standardization Agreement (STANAG), becoming mandatory by 1 October 1992.

== Successors ==
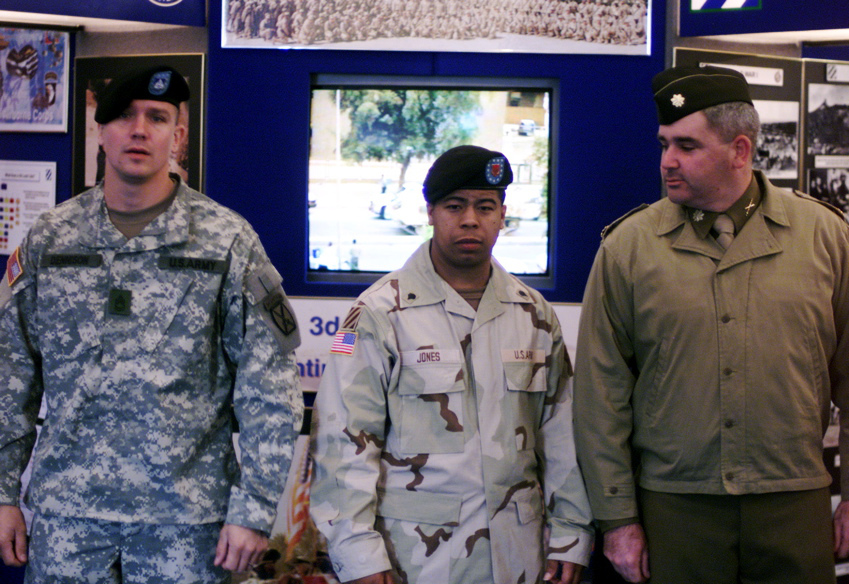
U.S. soldiers (from left to right) showcase the Universal Camouflage Pattern (left), Desert Camouflage Uniform (center), and a World War II-era uniform (right), in May 2005

The U.S. military ran trials of many camouflage patterns (some being used by foreign militaries), and issued environment-specific uniforms, notably the six-color Desert Battle Dress Uniform (DBDU), nicknamed the "chocolate chip camouflage", designed in 1962, and the "nighttime desert grid" (NCDBDU). Both uniforms were used in 1991, during the Persian Gulf War. These Desert BDUs were discontinued after the war.

The Desert Camouflage Uniform (DCU) in three-color desert camouflage was introduced in 1992, and was utilized in operations in Somalia (1993); it was in service in Afghanistan and Iraq from the start of hostilities, but the U.S. Army and U.S. Marine Corps have both replaced the DCU with newer uniforms (ACU and MCCUU, respectively). In testing, U.S. Army researchers found that, as in other environments, the color of desert terrain varies, and can range from pink to blue, depending on the minerals in the soil and the time of the day. Since patches of uniform color in the desert are usually 10 times larger than those in wooded areas, it was decided to alter the existing six-color DBDU pattern. This led to the development of a three-color pattern DCU, which was adopted.

The BDU is made in various camouflage patterns by various manufacturers, such as in the MultiCam camouflage, which is in use today mainly by the public, public service persons, and some foreign military units. BDUs can be purchased from civilian vendors in the UCP pattern analogous to the ACU as well, but these are not authorized for wear by the U.S. Army's soldiers.

=== U.S. Marine Corps ===
The development of modern camouflage patterns and the rising desire of the various U.S. military branches to differentiate themselves from each other has resulted in new patterns for uniforms. The U.S. Marine Corps was the first branch to replace their BDUs. The Marine Corps Combat Utility Uniform (MCCUU) uses the computer-generated MARPAT pattern and several other enhancements. It was approved for wear in June 2001, became available for purchase in 2002, and the changeover was completed by October 1, 2004. Beyond that date, the BDU was authorized for wear until April 1, 2005, with limited exceptions for those small numbers of Marine Corps personnel who did not yet have the MCCUU. USMC Special Operations units (MARSOC) have recently issued M81 woodland-patterned uniforms to supplement MARPAT uniforms for special missions.

=== U.S. Army ===
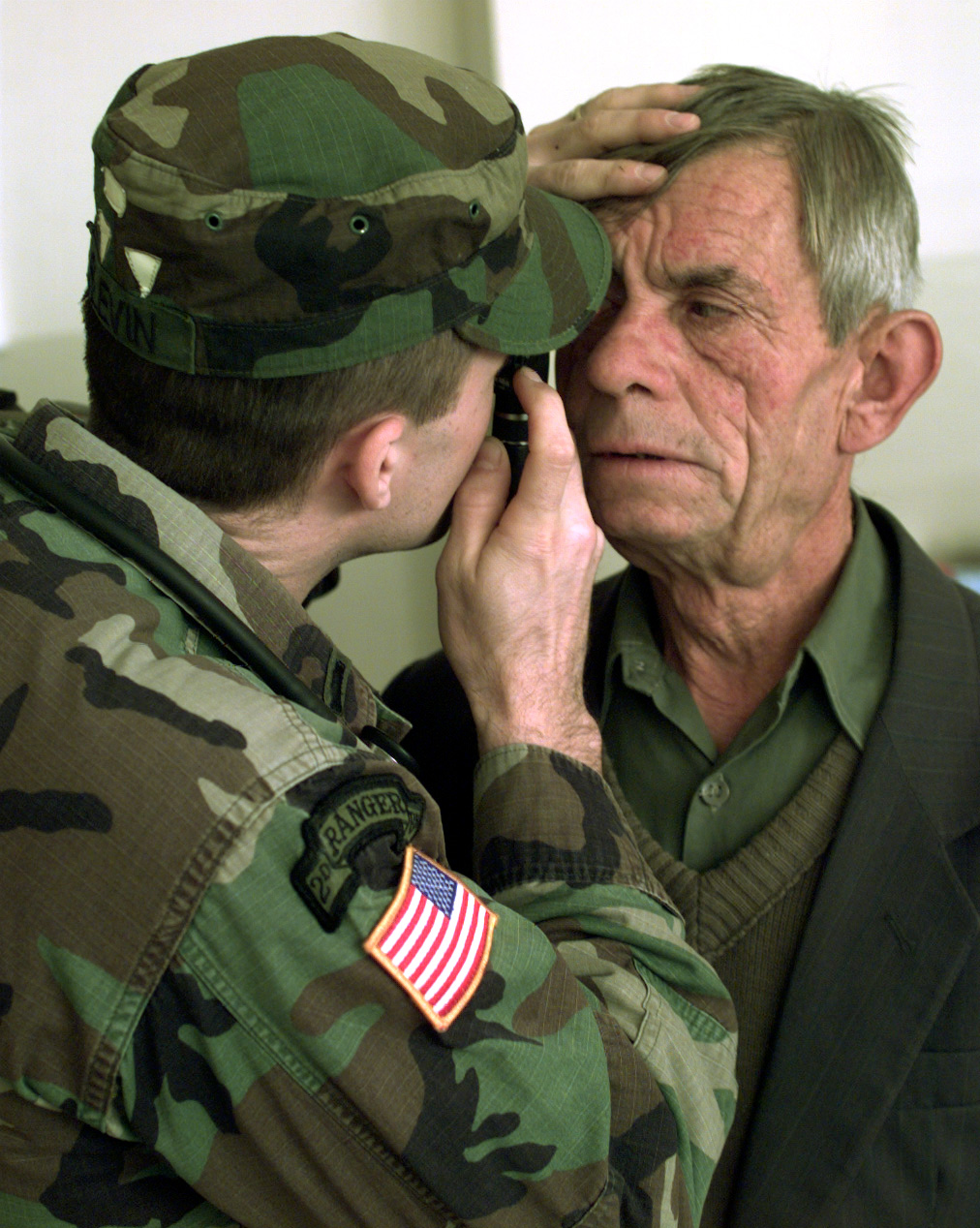
A U.S. Army medical officer wears a BDU while examining a man's eyes in January 2000

Nevada Army National Guardsmen wearing BDUs on the last day they were authorized by the U.S. Army, April 30, 2008.

In 2004, the U.S. Army unveiled the Army Combat Uniform (ACU), its successor to the BDU. From late 2005 to early 2008, the U.S. Army undertook the process of replacing the BDU with the ACU, with the BDU being formally discontinued by the Army in April 2008 (though most soldiers had been wearing the ACU for years by then). The Army Junior ROTC followed suit thereafter in 2009.

The original version of the ACU used a pixelated "digital" pattern known as the Universal Camouflage Pattern (UCP). UCP is similar to MARPAT but uses more neutral, less saturated colors. The neutral colors, primarily foliage green and sand yellow, are designed to work best in the desert, woodland, and urban combat situations. The ACU in UCP was used by the army in all environments except for areas with snow, as the UCP pattern works poorly against white despite the heavy use of grey. An all-white BDU and the ECWCS are used instead for winterized warfare. Beginning in 2014, the Army switched the ACU to use the Operational Camouflage Pattern (OCP), as UCP was seen as inadequate in many environments.

=== U.S. Department of Defense ===
Civilian employees of the U.S. Department of Defense in combat zones began wearing the Airman Battle Uniform and Army Combat Uniform in place of the BDU (and its cousin DCU) after it was replaced.

=== U.S. Navy ===
From 2004 to 2007, the U.S. Navy began issuing a pixelated blue and gray "digital" pattern Navy Working Uniform (NWU) in limited quantities to some sailors on an experimental test basis. While the NWU is neither a tactical uniform nor a battle dress uniform, it is intended to take the place of many existing work ensembles (utilities, wash khaki, coveralls, M81 BDU, etc.). The disruptive pattern is primarily intended to complement U.S. Navy ship colors and to hide stains and wear, and supposedly to make the wearer a less obvious visual target for hostile forces while working aboard a naval vessel in port.

To meet the Navy's cold-weather requirements, the NWU includes a fleece jacket, pullover sweater, and parka options. U.S. Navy SEALs, Seabees, and other U.S. Navy personnel deployed ashore under the cognizance of U.S. Naval Forces Central Command used "M81" woodland BDUs (referred to by the navy as CCUs) and DCUs for outdoor operations or activities in specific areas of responsibility (AOR), until the issuance of the NWU Type III in the AOR camouflage pattern.

=== U.S. Air Force ===
In 2004 and 2005, the U.S. Air Force experimented with but rejected a blue-toned tigerstripe uniform. In 2006, a new BDU-style uniform called the Airman Battle Uniform (ABU) was adopted, using a semi-pixelated tiger pattern with four soft earth tones consisting of tan, grey, green and blue. It failed, however, to incorporate many of the significant improvements of the ACU and MCCUU. By 2007, it was in current production. The National Commander of the Civil Air Patrol announced the USAF's approval for the Civil Air Patrol to begin its transition to the Airman Battle Uniform in 2016. The Air Force announced the adoption of the Army's Operational Camouflage Pattern uniform with a distinct insignia. The transition was to be complete by April 1, 2021.

=== U.S. Coast Guard ===
The U.S. Coast Guard has introduced the new Operational Dress Uniform (ODU) uniform in 2004 to replace the winter and summer "Undress Duty" uniform. Resembling the BDU, the ODU retains the basic design of the old-style BDU uniforms, but with the lower pockets on the blouse being eliminated. The sleeves can be worn "folded up" in a manner similar to the old U.S. Army and U.S. Air Force BDUs and the trousers "bloused" into the boots (unless boating shoes are worn, as is common for the U.S. Coast Guard Auxiliary, which patrols for the Coast Guard aboard privately owned watercraft), with the ODU black belt and blackened buckle being worn with the metal tip two to four inches from the buckle. The ODU is also issued in a single blue color as opposed to any camouflage pattern. The BDU and DCU were formally retired by the USCG in 2012.

The dark blue Coast Guard unit baseball-style cap is worn with this uniform. The ODU also has all of its allowable insignia sewn on, eliminating the chance of puncture wounds created by the pins if the individual suffers a blow to the chest while wearing a PFD or body armor. The ODU is not intended to be worn by Coast Guard units that engage in combat operations or are deployed overseas. These units continued to wear older woodland BDU and DCU uniforms before adopting the Navy Work Uniform for USCG units overseas or part of other DoD operations.

=== State Defense Forces ===
All State Defense Forces have since retired the woodland BDU uniform in favor of the Army Combat Uniform in either OCP or UCP for garrison and field wear with the Vermont State Guard being the last state to wear the uniform until 2024. Despite the uniform's retirement from daily use, it is still utilized in smaller effects as OPFOR wear for participating state soldiers.

== Other users ==
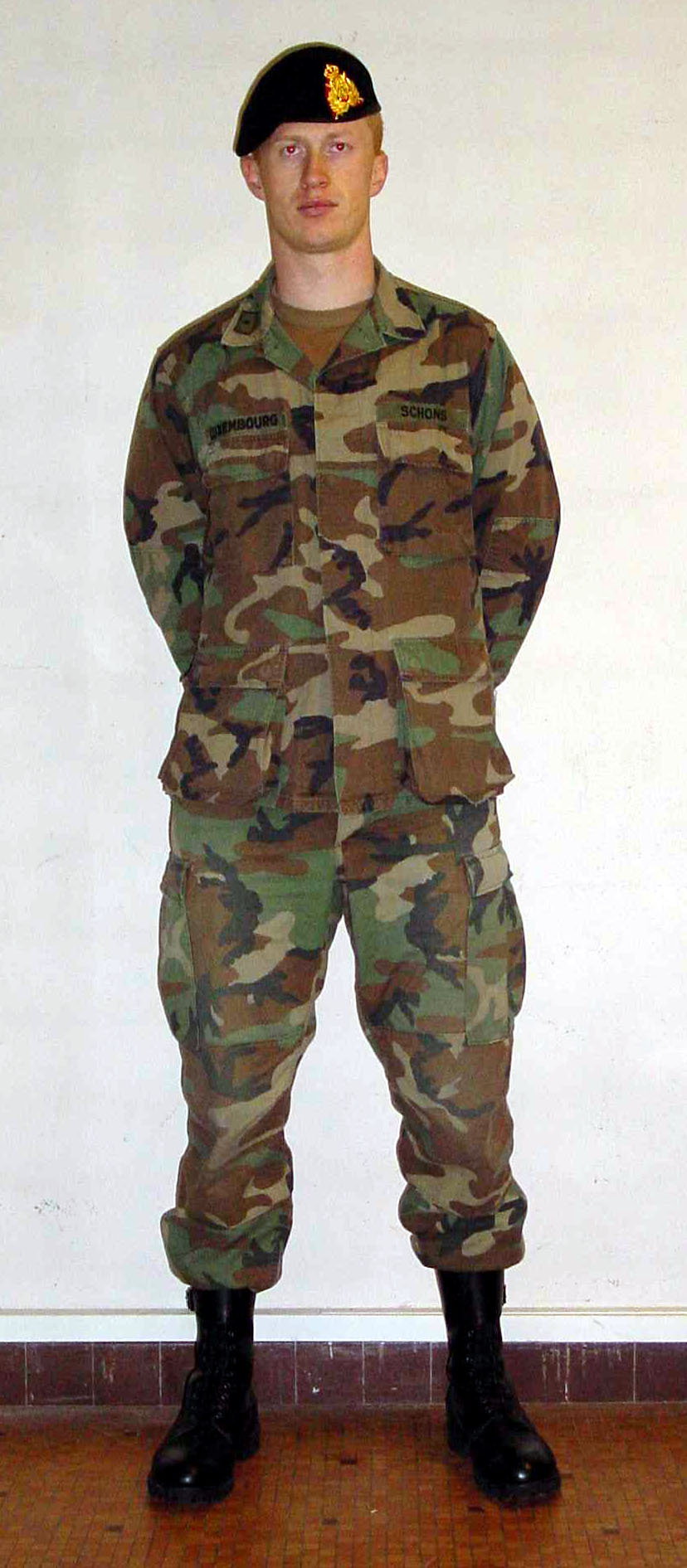
Luxembourg issued the BDU from 1985 US military aid as the Tenue S4 (Dress S4) before its replacement by the M2011 Luxo uniform

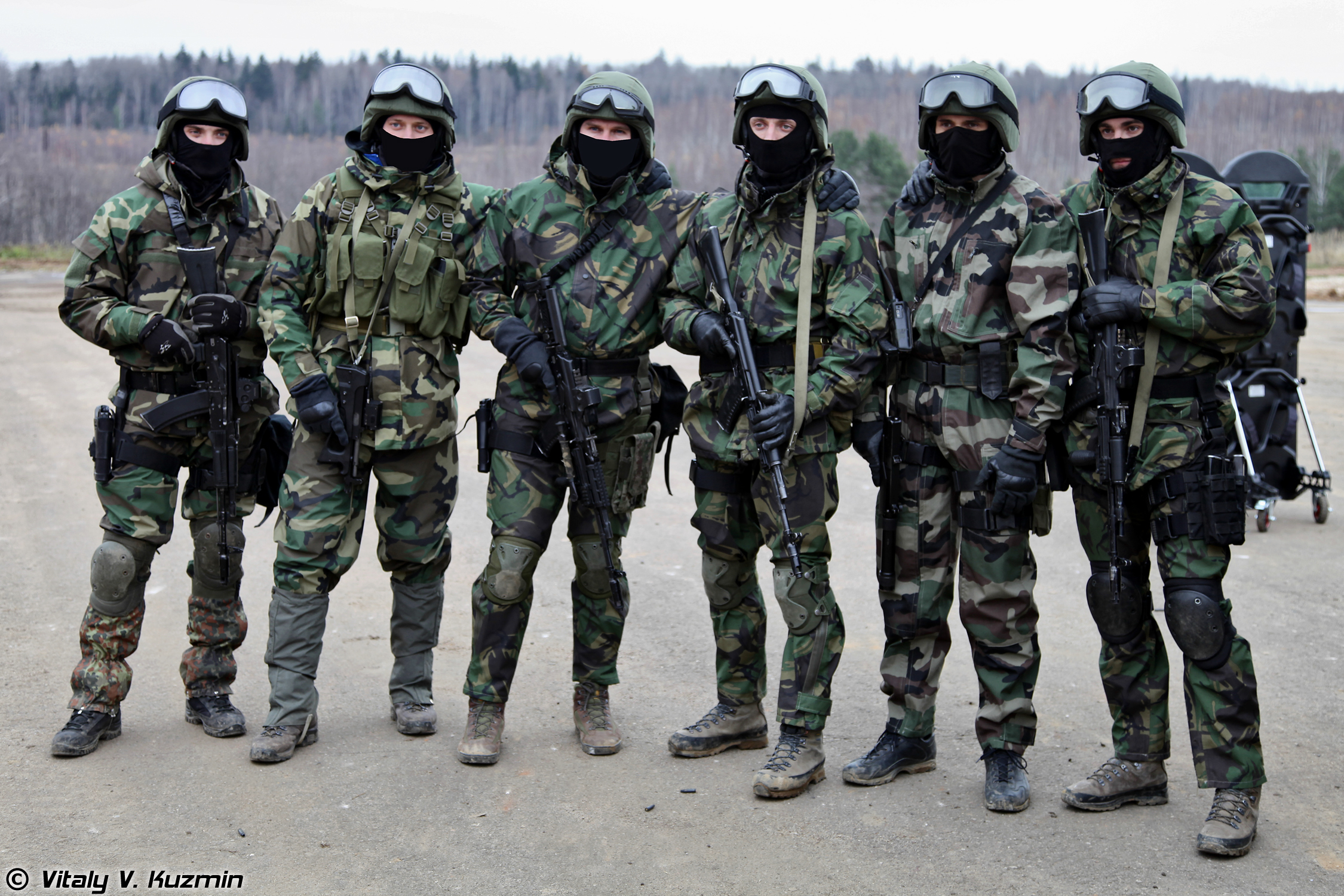
Russian Internal troops wearing "NATO" camouflage

- Estonia
- Georgia
- Latvia
- Luxembourg
- Russia - MVD Internal Troops wore a near copy called Les (forest) and a full copy called "NATO".

== See also ==
=== Successors ===
- Marine Corps Combat Utility Uniform (US Marine Corps)
- Navy Working Uniform (US Navy)
- Operational Dress Uniform (US Coast Guard)
- Airman Battle Uniform (US Air Force)
- Army Combat Uniform (US Army)

=== Former ===
- OG-107, the basic work utility uniform (fatigues) of all branches of the United States Armed Forces from 1952 until its discontinuation in 1989
- Desert Battle Dress Uniform, variant of the Battle Dress Uniform
- Desert Camouflage Uniform, successor to the Desert Battle Dress Uniform
- United States Army uniforms in World War II

=== Other ===
- Afghanka - similar Soviet uniform
- MultiCam, also known as OCP or OEFCP (OEF Camouflage Pattern)
- Desert Night Camouflage
- Operational Camouflage Pattern
- MARPAT
