= Desert Battle Dress Uniform =

US arid-environment camouflage uniform

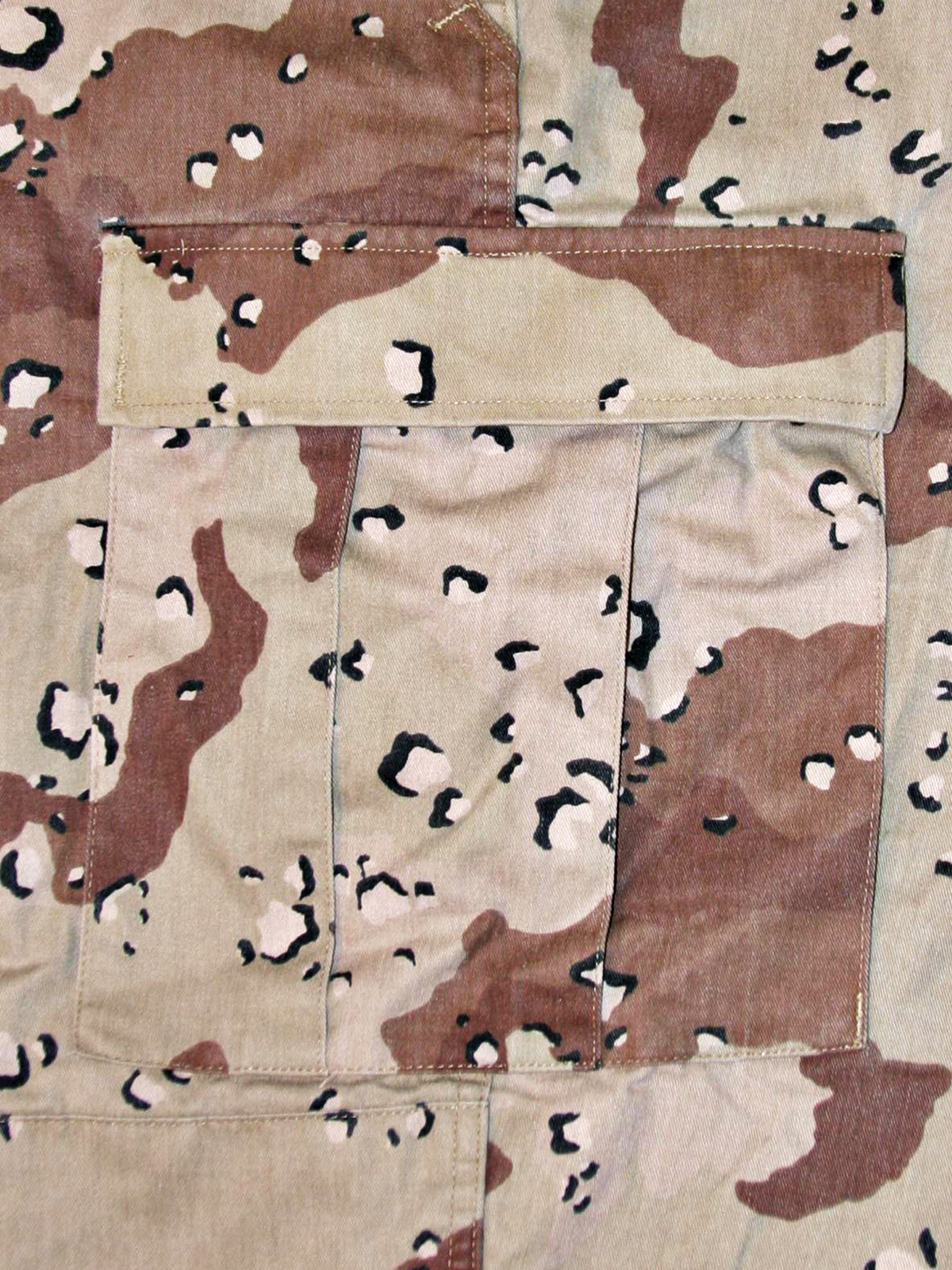
- Closeup of Desert Battle Dress Uniform (DBDU)
- Type: Military camouflage pattern

Service history
- In service: 1981–1995 (U.S. military)
- Used by: See Users for other foreign military/law enforcement users
- Wars: Persian Gulf War; Somali Civil War; Iraq War; Libyan civil war (2011)

Production history
- Designer: Mobility Equipment Research and Development Command (MERADCOM)
- Designed: 1960

The Desert Battle Dress Uniform (DBDU) is a U.S. arid-environment camouflage battle uniform that was used by the United States Armed Forces from the early 1980s to the early to mid 1990s, most notably during the Persian Gulf War. Although the U.S. military has long since abandoned the pattern, it is still in widespread use by militaries across the world as of the early 2020s.

== Appearance ==
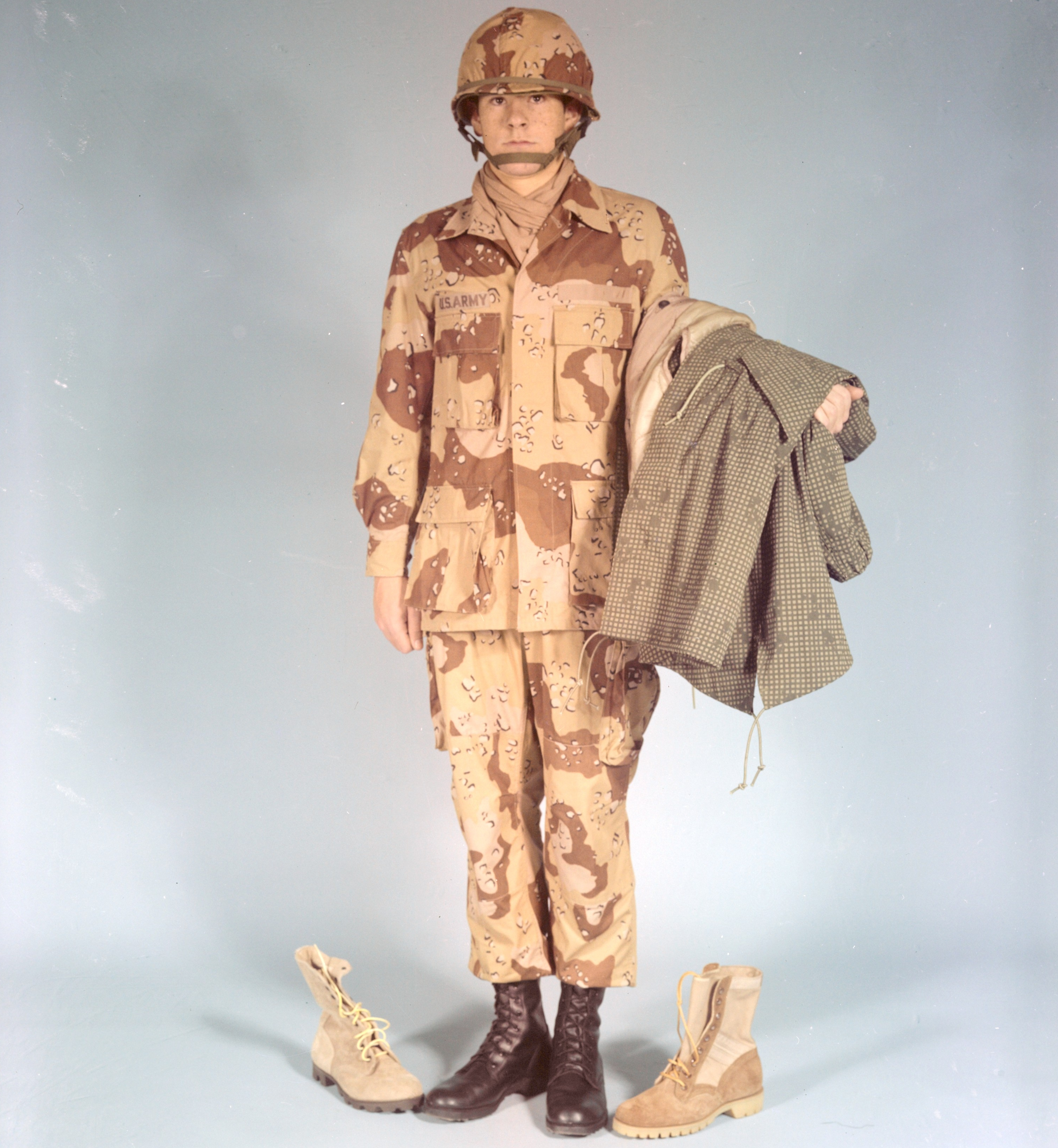
A man modelling an early version of the DBDU on December 6, 1976.

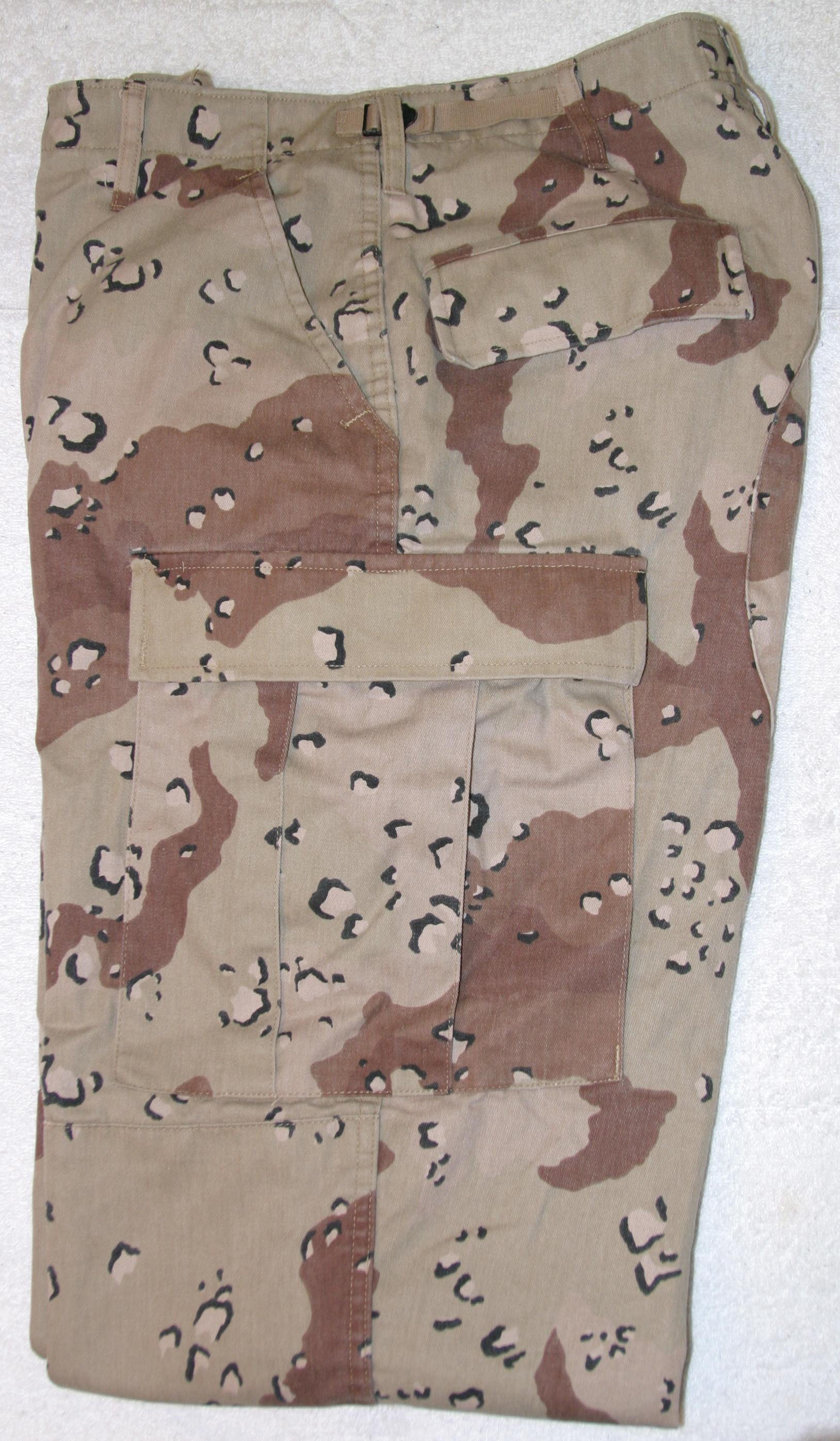
DBDU trousers, featuring the chocolate-chip camouflage pattern

The Desert Battle Dress Uniform was designed in 1970 and uses a camouflage pattern known as the Six-Color Desert Pattern or colloquially as Chocolate-Chip Camouflage and Cookie Dough Camouflage. The camouflage received its nickname because it resembles chocolate-chip cookie dough. It is made up of a base pattern of light tan overlaid with broad swathes of pale green and wide two-tone bands of brown. Clusters of black and white spots are scattered over, to mimic the appearance of pebbles and their shadows. The cut of the DBDU is virtually identical to that of the Temperate BDU, retaining the ‘Elvis Collar’, and it was initially made with 50% / 50% nylon-cotton (Nyco) blend. An improved version, the Enhanced Desert BDU or EDBDU, was adopted in the early 1990s, in 100% ripstop cotton. DBDUs were used alongside PASGT helmet covers, ALICE rucksack covers, caps and boonie hats also made in the 6-color pattern. Most early DBDUs have an orange tint, with later versions, especially those issued before and during the Gulf War having a more reddish one.

== History ==
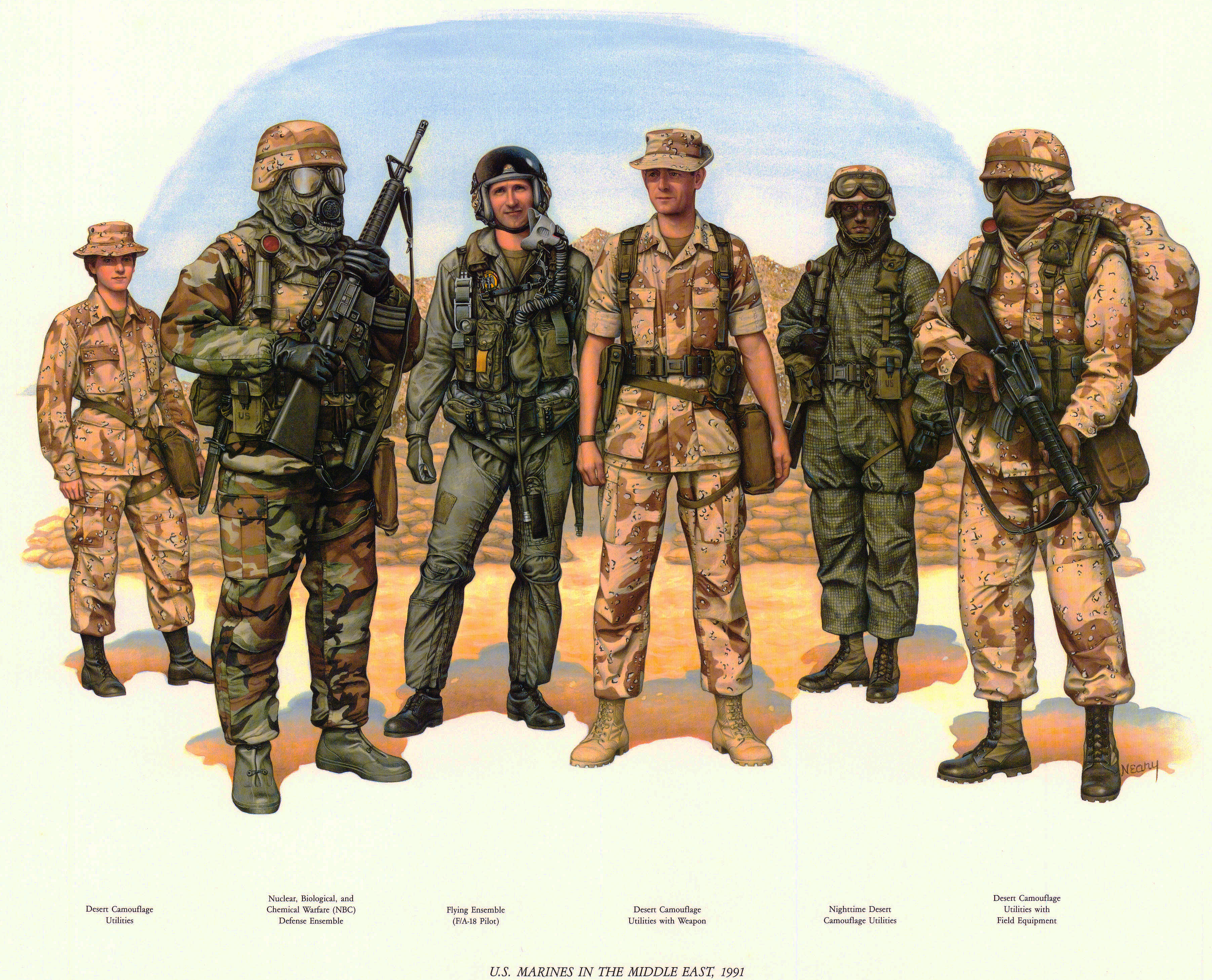
A drawing of U.S. Marines in the Persian Gulf War with the DBDU

Although the chocolate-chip camouflage became well known during the Persian Gulf War, it was originally designed decades prior, in 1960 at the Camouflage Branch, Mobility Equipment Research and Development Command (MERADCOM) at Fort Belvoir. The U.S. Army, believing that it might one day become necessary to intervene in the Arab–Israeli conflicts, developed a test pattern using the deserts of the southwestern United States as a model. When the hostilities in the Middle East wound down, the test pattern was mothballed. Renewed interest in desert camouflage due to the US increasing its military presence in the Middle East in the late 1970s led to the project being revived. The formation of the United States Rapid Deployment Forces (RDF) in 1979, with its remit to operate in the Middle East, and protect U.S. interests in the Persian Gulf region, saw the need for desert camouflage clothing to emerge again.

In 1981, issue of the new Desert Battle Dress Uniform (DBDU) began, limited to elements of the new Rapid Deployment Force (RDF), formed to act as the US contingency response force for the Middle East. Units that took part in the annual Bright Star exercises with Egypt and the Multinational Force and Observers (MFO) responsible for monitoring the Sinai Peninsula were also issued the uniform. The six-color desert pattern entered service in 1981 at the same time as the woodland BDUs and would be worn in limited numbers by U.S. troops taking part in the biennial Bright Star exercises in Egypt during the 1980s, and by FORSCOM peacekeepers assigned to the Multinational Force and Observers in the Egyptian Sinai Desert, but was not issued in large numbers prior to the Persian Gulf War. However, there is evidence that the six-color desert pattern camouflage was in use before 1981 with photographs of American military personnel involved in Operation Eagle Claw in April 1980 using this camouflage pattern in the failed attempt to rescue U.S. embassy staff being held hostage in Iran.

The pattern was unpopular with American soldiers during the Gulf War. Feedback from these users indicated that the design contrasted too much with the terrain, preventing the camouflage from blending in effectively. Anecdotal evidence suggested that the dark areas of the pattern warmed up more than the paler parts under desert sunlight, and retained the heat longer. The six colors were also more expensive to manufacture than three or four colors, and the need for a camouflage that would be suitable for use in any desert resulted in a requirement for a new desert camouflage uniform. The U.S. Army Natick Soldier Center began the search for a substitute. Samples of sand and earth from the Middle East were measured for optical and infrared reflectance, and seven trial patterns were created using these statistics. The patterns were evaluated in fourteen different desert locations and narrowed down to one favorite. The resulting "Desert Camouflage Pattern: Combat" was standardized in 1990, but was not ready before troops deployed to Saudi Arabia during the Persian Gulf War. Consequently, U.S. forces wore the six-color BDUs during the campaign. During that war, after initiatives by General Norman Schwarzkopf, the six-color Desert BDU was produced in 100% cotton poplin without reinforcement panels in order to improve comfort in hot desert conditions. A total of 500,000 improved cotton BDUs were ordered. However, cost concerns caused the cotton six-color Desert BDU to be discontinued shortly after the Persian Gulf War.

=== U.S. Army ===
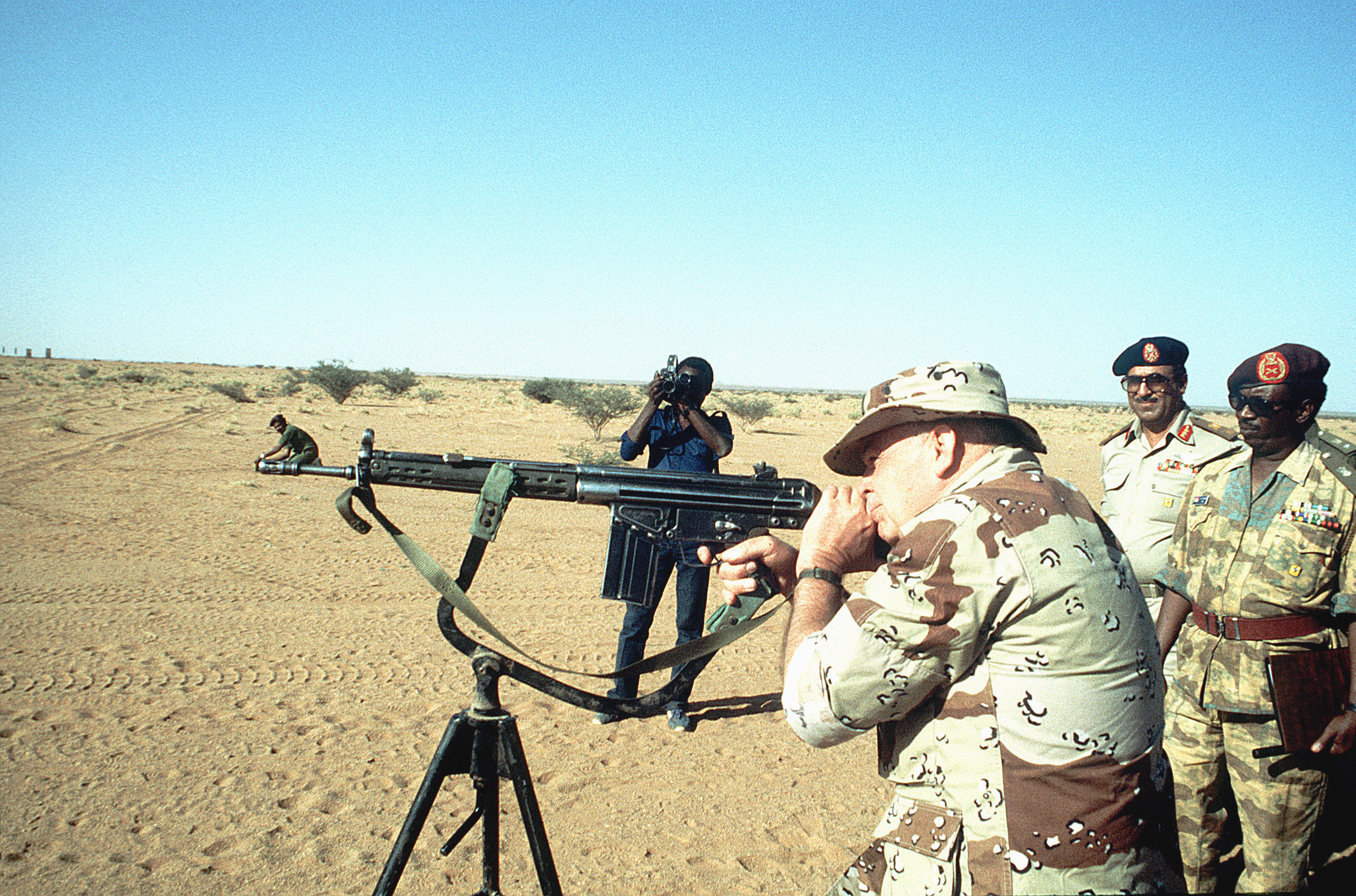
Desert Battle Dress Uniform wearing Lieutenant General Robert C. Kingston, commanding general, US Central Command, fires a German built 7.62 mm G3 Heckler and Koch rifle during BRIGHT STAR '82, an exercise involving troops from the US, Egypt, Sudan, Somalia and Oman

With limited issuing dating back to the 1980 mission to the rescue American hostages in Iran, the DBDU was unique, in that when it was officially issued in 1981, the 6-color desert pattern was only issued in limited numbers to division personnel like the U.S. 82nd Airborne or 101st Airborne who deployed to Egypt and the Sinai desert to participate in the "Bright Star" exercise in December 1980. The DBDU was the U.S. Army's first fully functional desert combat pattern from 1981 to 1992.

=== U.S. Marine Corps ===
Like the Army, the DBDU was seldom issued whenever Marines were deployed to participate in the "Bright Star" exercises, but became their standard arid combat uniform by 1985. The 6-color desert pattern was used by the U.S. Marine Corps from 1982 to 1995.

=== U.S. Air Force ===
First issued in 1982 for their participation and deployments to arid regions, the DBDU became the United States Air Forces primary desert uniform from 1982 to 1993.

=== U.S. Navy ===
Like its sister branches, The Navy began limited issue of the DBDU in the early 80s and became standard wide by 1985. It would remain the Navy's main desert combat uniform from the early '80s to the mid '90s.

=== U.S. Coast Guard ===
The Coast Guard was the last branch to see remaining issue of the DBDU in the mid to late 1980s.

=== Replacement ===
An initial batch of desert BDUs in the new camouflage scheme was en route to the Middle East when hostilities ceased. The pattern, officially issued with the newer Desert Camouflage Uniform (DCU) in the early 1990s, consisted of a subtle blend of large pastel green and light tan shapes, with sparsely placed, narrow, reddish brown patches, leading the design to be unofficially nicknamed the “Coffee Stain” pattern.

Both patterns were briefly used together during the transition period, most notably during Operation Restore Hope and Operation Gothic Serpent (some U.S. Army Rangers during the latter occasionally wore the newer three-color DCU's along with kevlar helmet covers retaining the old six-color pattern. The same dress was also worn by soldiers of the 10th Mountain Division during the Battle of Qala-i-Jangi in 2001). During Operation Bright Star 1995, Third Army personnel wore the three-color uniform while troops from Fort Bragg (330th MCC) wore the six-color uniform for the 75-day exercise. In the 2003 invasion of Iraq, the U.S. military did not use the DBDU, and instead mostly used the DCU's tri-color pattern and to a lesser extent, the MARPAT camouflage pattern.

== Legacy ==
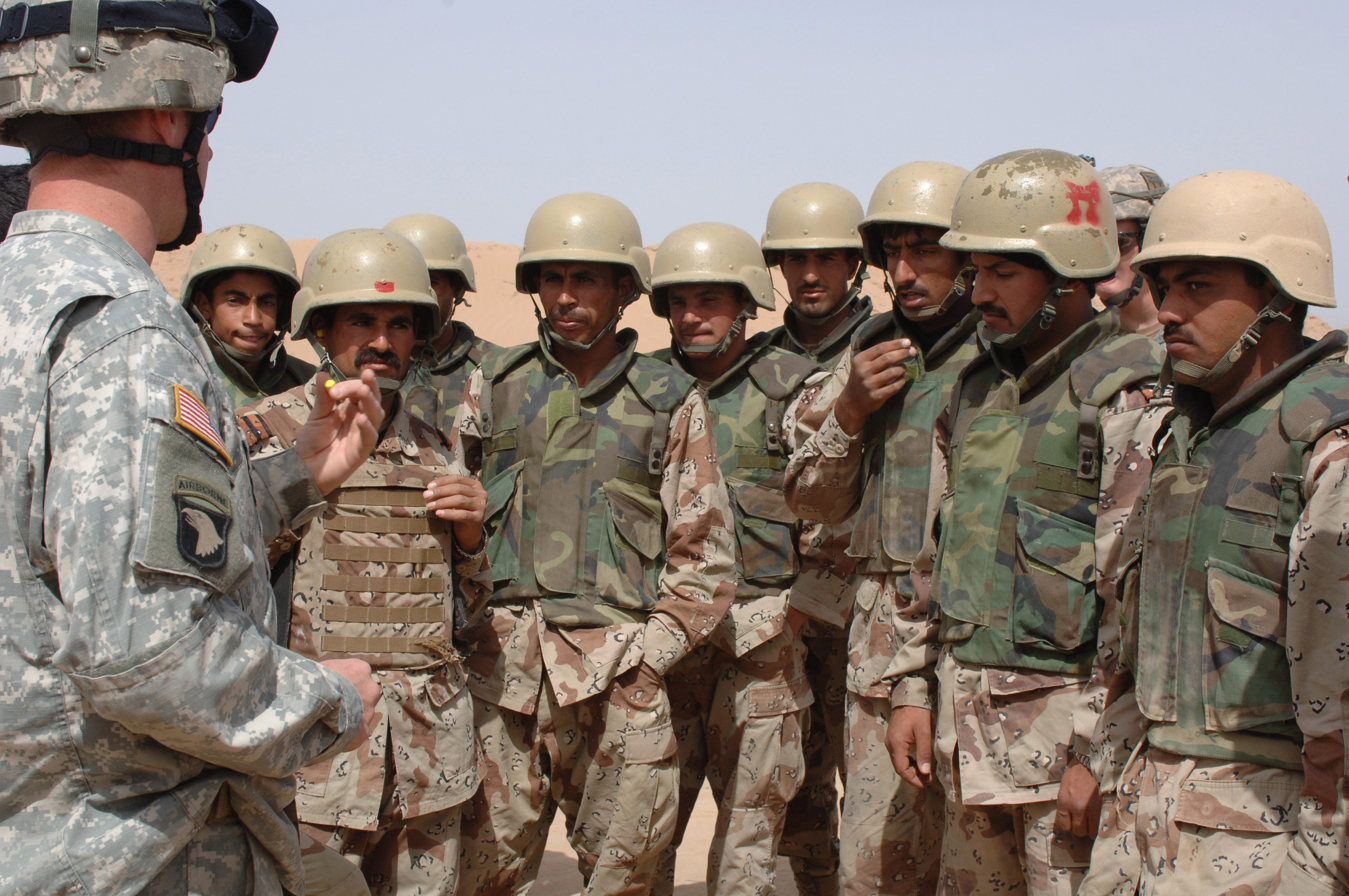
Iraqi soldiers in 2006 wearing DBDUs

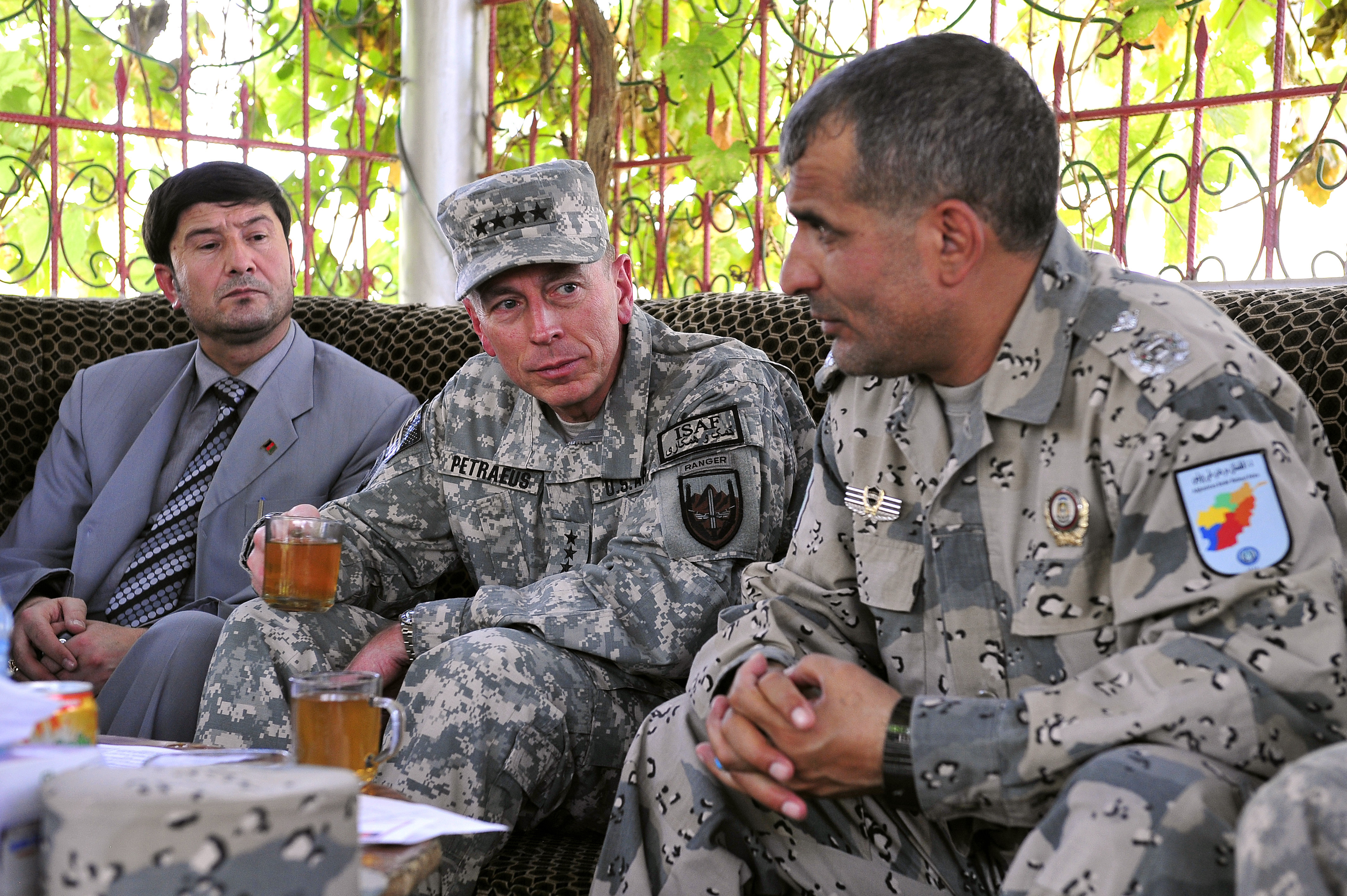
David H. Petraeus meets with the Afghan Border Police Commander, General Abdul Khalil Bakhten, who wears the Saudi grey version

As of the early 2010s, the chocolate-chip pattern is still in widespread use across the world, long after the United States abandoned it. A uniform similar to the Desert Battle Dress Uniform was issued to the Iraqi National Guard before it was dissolved in 2004 and to the Iraqi security forces.

South Korean forces have used, in limited numbers since 1993, a variant with brown replacing the black in the original U.S. design; this South Korean design has also been tested in the United Arab Emirates.

The Oman National Guard use a pattern mixing chocolate-chip with 'amoeba', while the National Guards of both Saudi Arabia and Kuwait use a grey variation on the chocolate-chip design. The Saudis also use a grey, black, and white 'urban' variation and the police wear a blue version of the same design; Palestinian police also use a blue chocolate-chip patterned uniform.

The South African "Soldier 2000" pattern is similar to the U.S. design. A copy of the pattern, using tan, medium brown, bottle-green and greyish green, in addition to the black-on-white pebbles, is used in Kazakhstan.

== Users ==
- Argentina
- Bolivia
- Brazil
- Chad
- China: Made own camos based on DBDU fabric.
- Djibouti
- Dominican Republic
- Egypt: Made own camos based on DBDU fabric.
- El Salvador
- Eritrea: Made own camos based on DBDU fabric.
- Estonia
- Ethiopia
- Hamas: Pattern used by the Al-Qassam Brigades.
- Iran: Had used localized DBDU pattern.
- Ireland: Used by Irish troops during peacekeeping operations in Somalia in 1993.
- Israel: Used by Israeli military in unofficial capacity.
- Japan
- Jordan
- Kazakhstan
- Kuwait: Had used localized DBDU pattern.
- Libya
- Mali
- Mexico
- Niger
- Oman
- Pakistan: Made own camos based on DBDU fabric.
- Palestine
- Paraguay
- Peru
- Philippines
- Rwanda
- Saudi Arabia: Grey version used by the Saudi Border Guard forces and King Fahd college students. Six-colored version also used.
- Somalia: Used by Naval infantry troops and Coastguard
- South Korea: Was used by the South Korean military during the Iraq War and in the War in Afghanistan.
- Sudan
- Syria
- Tajikistan
- Thailand
- Turkmenistan
- United Arab Emirates
- Yemen

=== Former users ===
- Iraq: Formerly used by the reformed Iraqi military, before being succeeded by the Desert Camouflage Uniform.
- Spain: Made own camos based on DBDU fabric. Replaced by Pixelado árido.
- United States: Former standard camouflage uniform pattern from 1981 to 1995.
  - United States Army
  - United States Marine Corps
  - United States Navy
  - United States Air Force

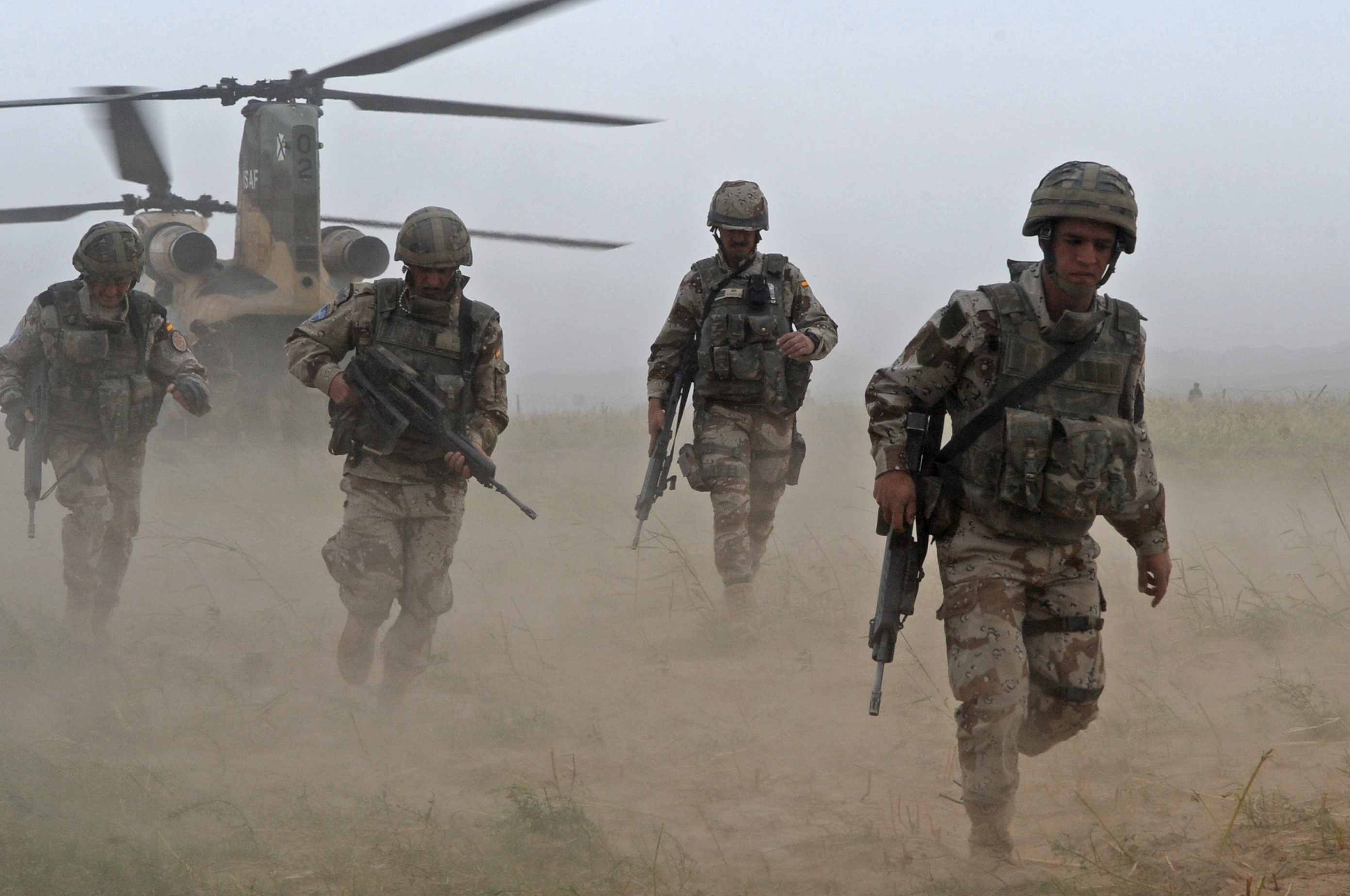
DBDU-clad Spanish soldiers disembark from a CH-47 Chinook helicopter in Afghanistan, September 2008.

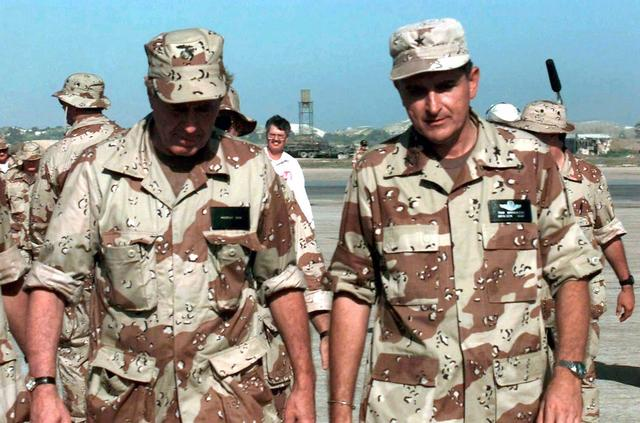
U.S. President George H. W. Bush and Brigadier General Thomas Mikolajcik wearing DBDUs as they visit Mogadishu Airport in January 1993.

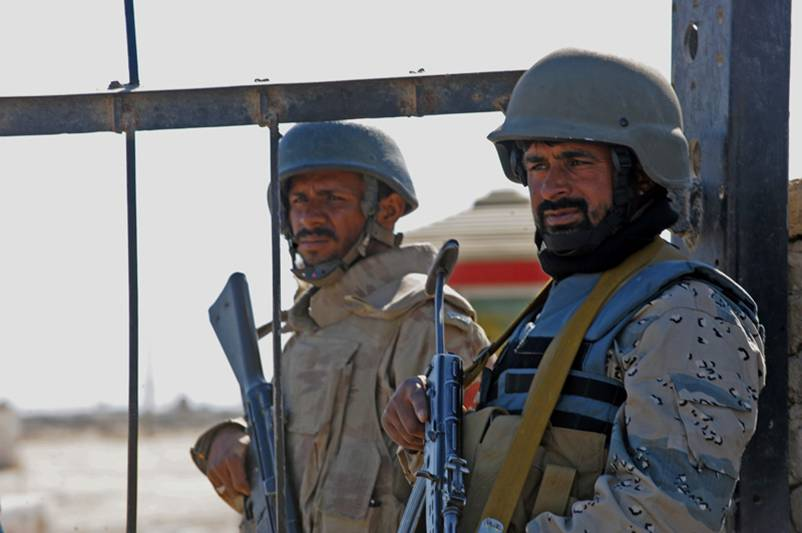
Pakistan Frontier Corps Balochistan soldier (left) and the Afghan Border Police soldier (right), wearing the Saudi blue DBDUs, guard the Durand Line's Friendship Gate, seven km southeast of Spin Boldak, Afghanistan.

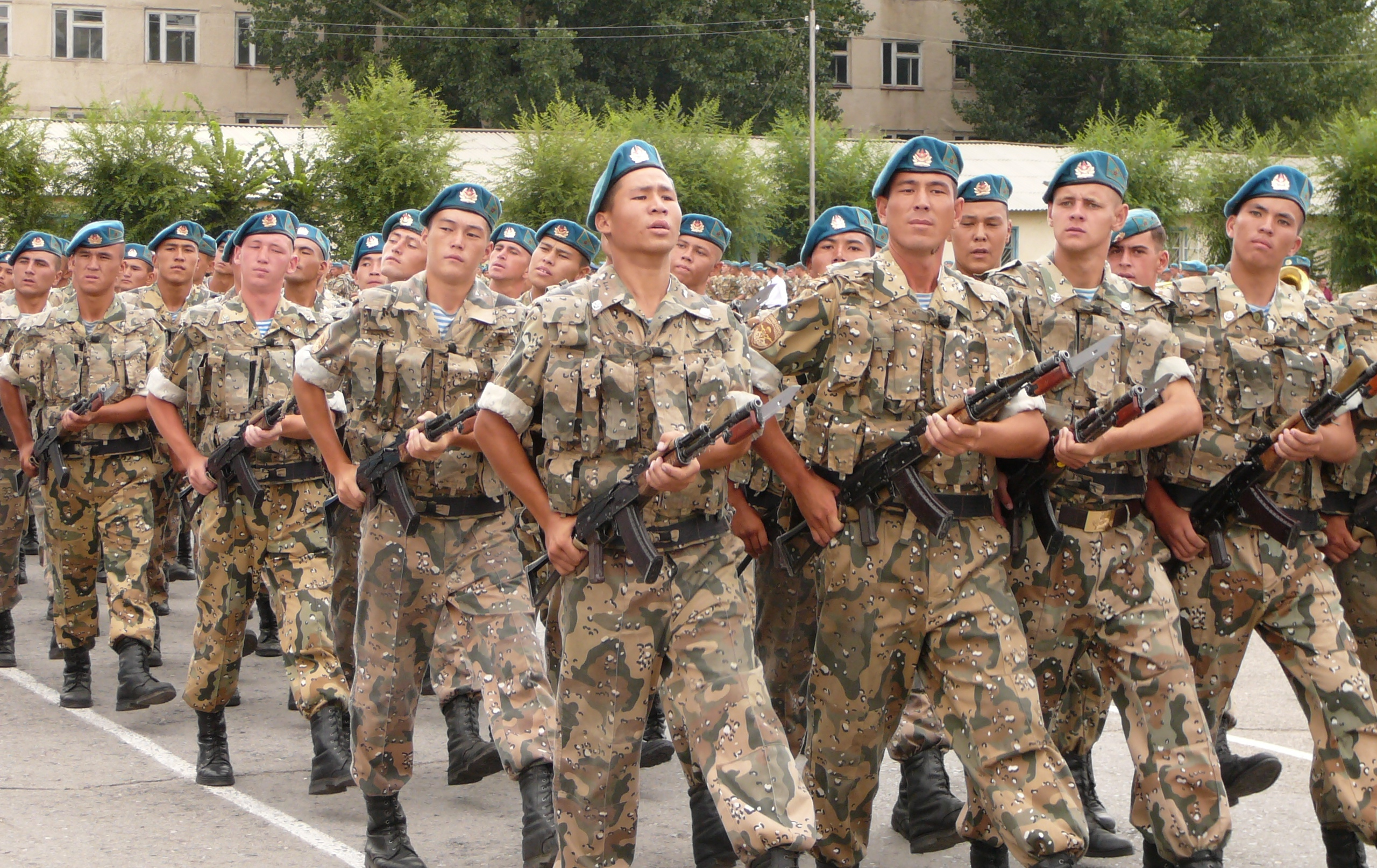
Kazakh paratroopers wearing Grey DBDUs in 2007.

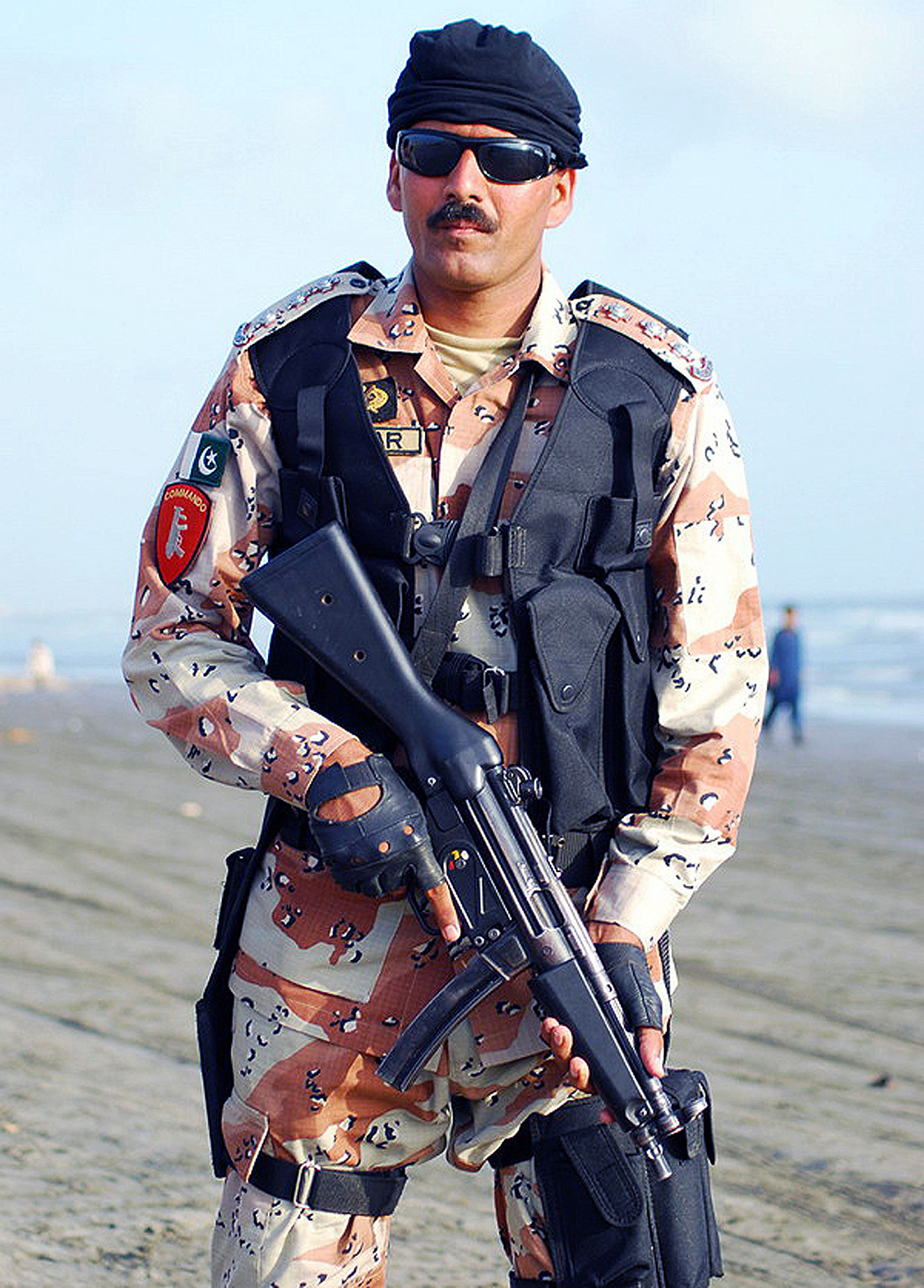
A DBDU-wearing Pakistani Ranger (Sindh) on duty.

== See also ==
- Desert Night Camouflage
- Army Combat Uniform
- Battle Dress Uniform

== Bibliography ==
- Dougherty, Martin (2017). Camouflage at War: An Illustrated Guide from 1914 to the Present Day. London, UK: Amber Books. ISBN 978-1782744986.
- Larson, Eric H. (2021). Camouflage: International Ground Force Patterns, 1946–2017. Barnsley: Pen & Sword. ISBN 9781526739537.
