= Desert Camouflage Uniform =

Arid-environment camouflage uniform used by U.S. military from mid-1990s to early 2010s

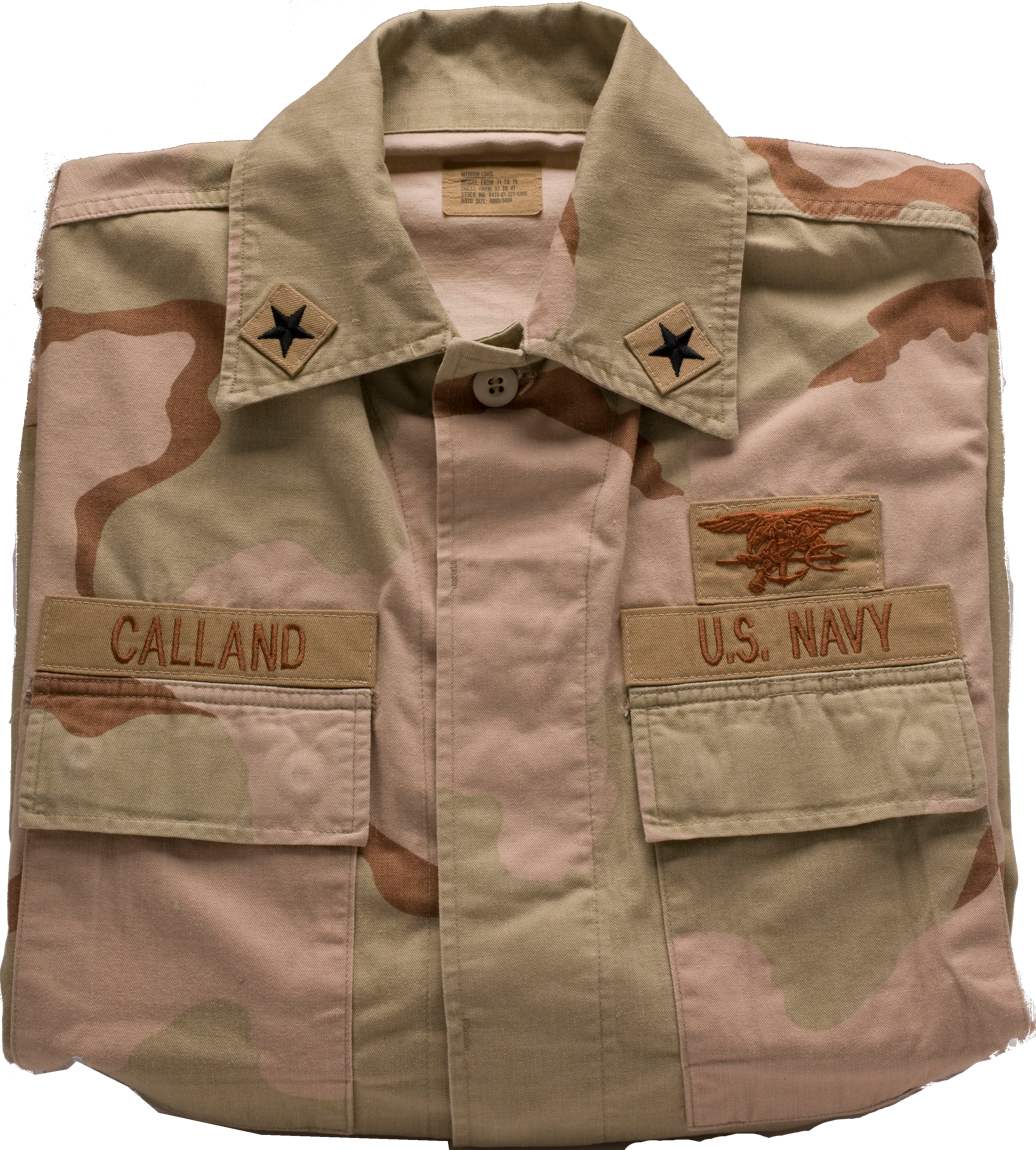
- A folded and buttoned U.S. Navy DCU blouse
- Type: Military camouflage uniform
- Place of origin: United States

Service history
- In service: 1990–2008 (U.S. Army); 1992–2005 (U.S. Marine Corps); 1989–2011 (U.S. Air Force); 1992–2012 (U.S. Navy); 1992-present (United States Special Operations Command)
- Used by: See Users for other foreign military/law enforcement users
- Wars: Gulf War (very limited use); Battle of Mogadishu; War in Afghanistan; Faylaka Island attack Iraq War; War in Donbas

Production history
- Designer: Natick Laboratories
- Produced: 1989–2012
- Variants: Close Combat Uniform

The Desert Camouflage Uniform (DCU) is an arid-environment camouflage uniform that was used by the United States Armed Forces from the early-1990s to the early 2010s. In terms of pattern and textile cut, it is identical to the U.S. military's Battle Dress Uniform (BDU) uniform, but features a three-color desert camouflage pattern of dark brown, pale olive green (which is reported to look mint-colored on 1989/90 pattern DCUs), and beige, as opposed to the four-color woodland pattern of the BDU. It replaced the previous Desert Battle Dress Uniform (DBDU) which featured a six-color "chocolate chip" pattern of beige, pale olive green, two tones of brown, and black and white rock spots. Although completely phased out of frontline use in the U.S. Armed Forces, some pieces and equipment printed in the DCU camouflage pattern are used in limited numbers such as MOPP suits and/or vests.

== History ==
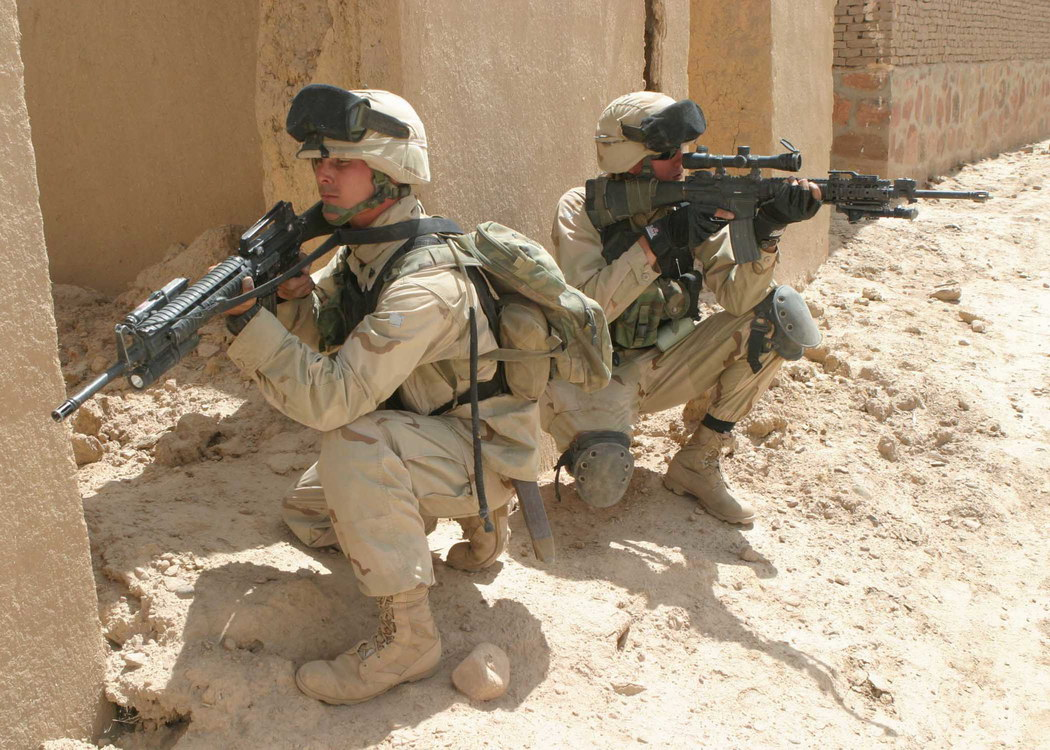
Marines from the U.S. 6th Marine Regiment wearing DCUs in 2004

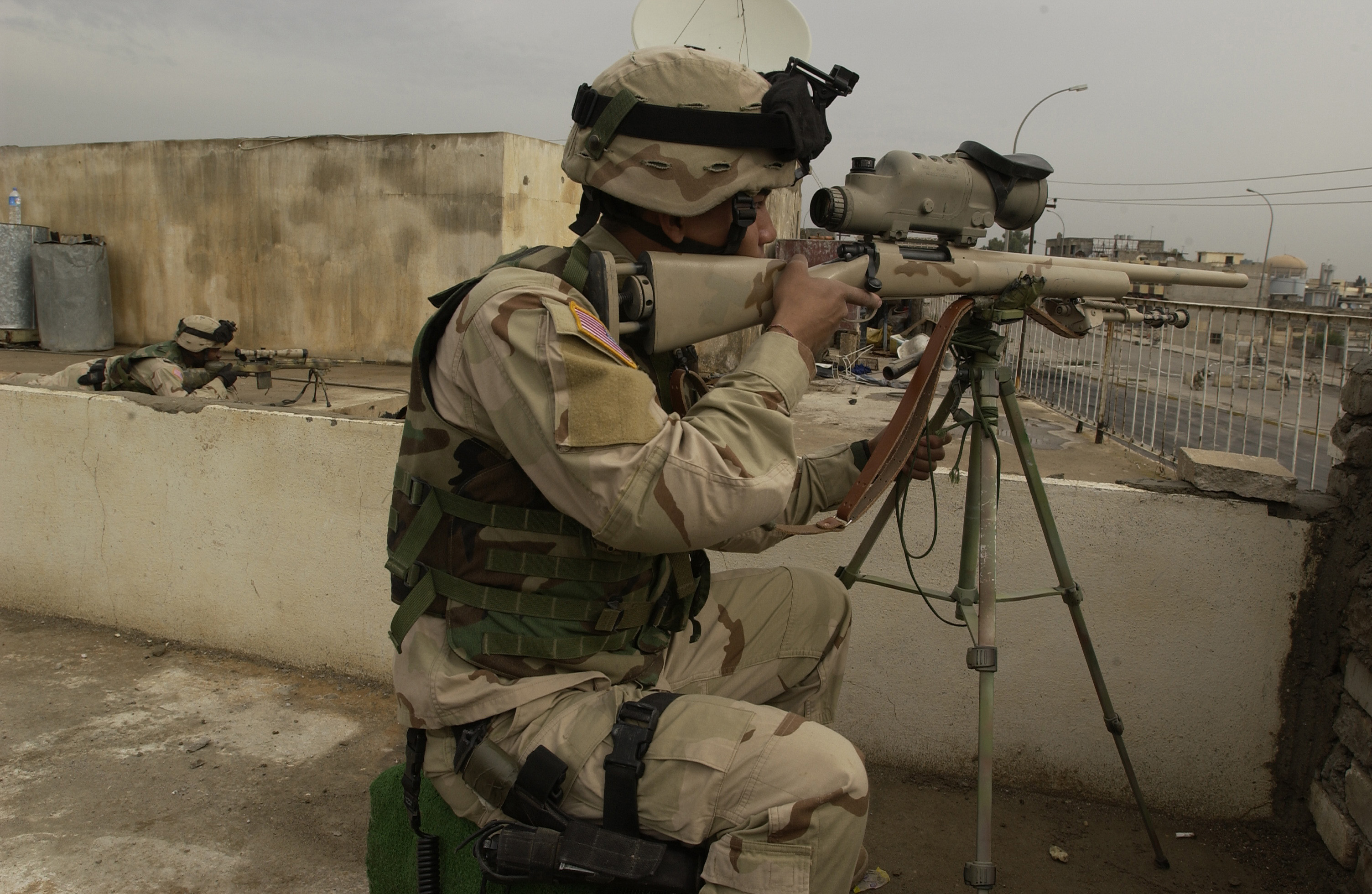
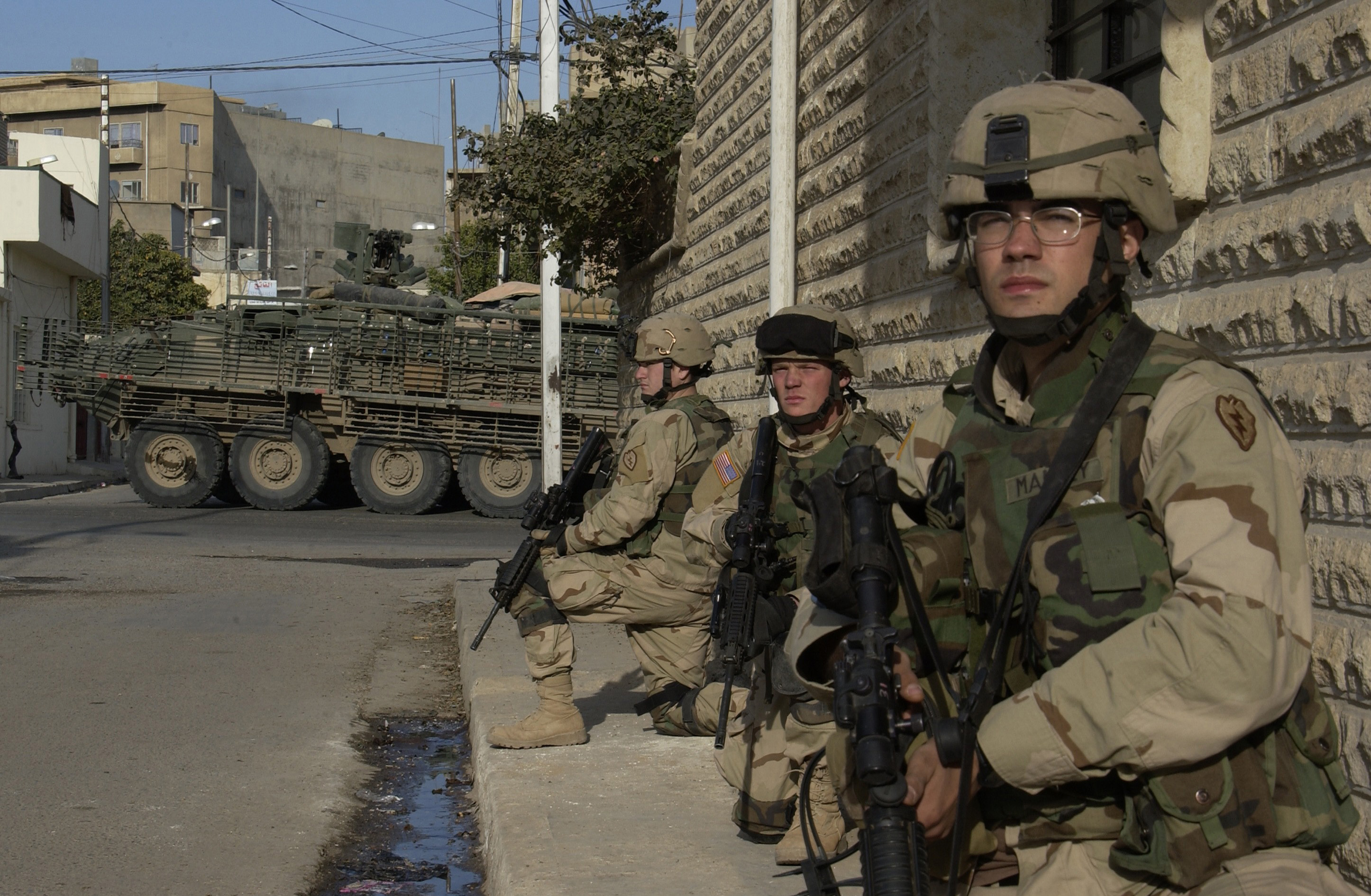
U.S. Army soldiers in late 2004 wearing the Tricolor Desert-patterned Combat Uniform (CU)

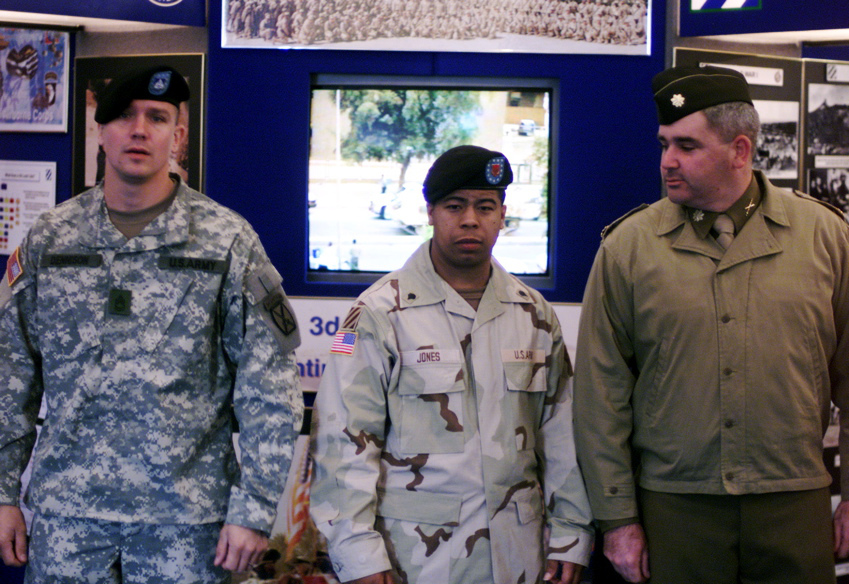
U.S. Army soldiers in May 2005 wearing the Army Combat Uniform, Desert Camouflage Uniform, and a World War II–era uniform (left to right)

U.S. Navy Seabees in August 2012 wearing the DCU

Designed in the mid-1980s by the U.S. Army's Natick Laboratories, the DCU was first issued to Air Force security personnel.

The DCU and its camouflage pattern, officially known as the three-color desert camouflage pattern and known colloquially as "coffee stain camouflage" and "tri-color desert", were developed to replace the six-color desert camouflage "chocolate-chip camouflage" uniform, which was deemed not as effective as DCU for desert combat. As opposed to the original six-color desert Natick had originally designed it in the American-Mexico desert area which was rockier and elevated which was often not encountered, the DCU was created primarily for a lower, more open, and less rocky desert battlefield space which became a common sight throughout the Gulf War. As a replacement pattern, this meant a new arid region had to be utilized to test the effectiveness of the DCU. Desert soil samples from parts of the Middle East, namely Saudi Arabia, and Kuwait, were compared to similar terrain in the United States for evaluation. Initially, color palettes were reused from 6-color desert.

In October 1990, the U.S. Army Infantry School, of TRADOC, selected and approved the three-color desert pattern. Immediately afterward, military specifications (Note: Interim amendment, (DCU's) cotton/nylon twill fabric (15 October 1990): Revision C Int. Amdt. 1 (GL); Interim amendment, (DCU's) cotton ripstop fabric (15 October 1990): Revision G Int. Amdt. 1 (GL); Interim amendment, (M65's) cotton/nylon sateen fabric (15 October 1990): Revision G Interim Amdt. 2) were updated to incorporate the tricolor pattern into the 'Desert Battle Dress Uniform' (temperate weight), the 'Hot Weather Battle Dress Uniform', and the M65 field coat.

By 1992, the first wide scale batches of DCUs were issued first by the United States Army, and within a year to the United States Air Force, and replaced the majority of the DBDU by 1993, with the United States Navy and Marines replacing their older six-colored desert fatigues from 1992 through 1995.

=== U.S. Army ===
First fielded in 1989 by the U.S. Air Force, the DCU would be also adopted by the U.S. Army and serve as the new primary desert combat pattern from 1991 until it was fully replaced by the ACU in 2008. Soldiers frequently unofficially would modify their DCUs and BDUs by removing the lower two blouse pockets and attaching them to the shoulders, along with adding hook-and-loop fasteners for insignia; uniforms modified in this fashion became known as "Raid mod" uniforms. These improvements were subsequently integrated into the "Close Combat Uniform" and "Combat Uniform", which were issued to U.S. Army soldiers in Stryker Brigade elements of the 2nd Infantry Division and 25th Infantry Division, respectively, when they were deployed to Iraq in fall 2003 and winter 2004. In January 2003, development of the ACU began with input from certain members of the 3rd SBCT, 2nd Infantry Division. In June 2004, the Army unveiled a new pixel-style camouflage pattern called UCP (Universal Camouflage Pattern), to be used on the DCU's successor uniform, the Army Combat Uniform (ACU). In mid-2005, the DCU and the BDU began slowly being discontinued within the U.S. Army. By 2007, most U.S. soldiers were wearing the ACU with both the DCU and BDU being fully replaced by early 2008.

=== U.S. Marine Corps ===
Following the Army, the United States Marine Corps began issuing the DCU from 1992 and remained the Marine Corps standard arid combat uniform until January 2002, when the U.S. Marine Corps became the first branch to replace both its BDUs and DCUs with the Marine Corps Combat Utility Uniform (MCCUU), completely replacing them by April 2005.

=== U.S. Air Force ===
Along with the Army, the Air Force began issuing the DCU to security personnel in the Middle East in late 1989 then adopting it in 1990 where it remained as the primary desert camouflage pattern until The U.S. Air Force officially replaced the BDU and DCU on 1 November 2011, with the Airman Battle Uniform (ABU), though most airmen had been using the ABU for a couple years before that date.

=== U.S. Navy ===
The United States Navy issued the DCU from 1992 until 2010 when it was replaced by the arid variant of the Navy Working Uniform (NWU), known as the NWU Type II. The DCU was retired by the navy in late 2012.

=== U.S. Coast Guard ===
The DCU was introduced to the Coast Guard sometime after 1992 until the DCU and BDU were formally retired by the USCG in 2012.

== Users ==
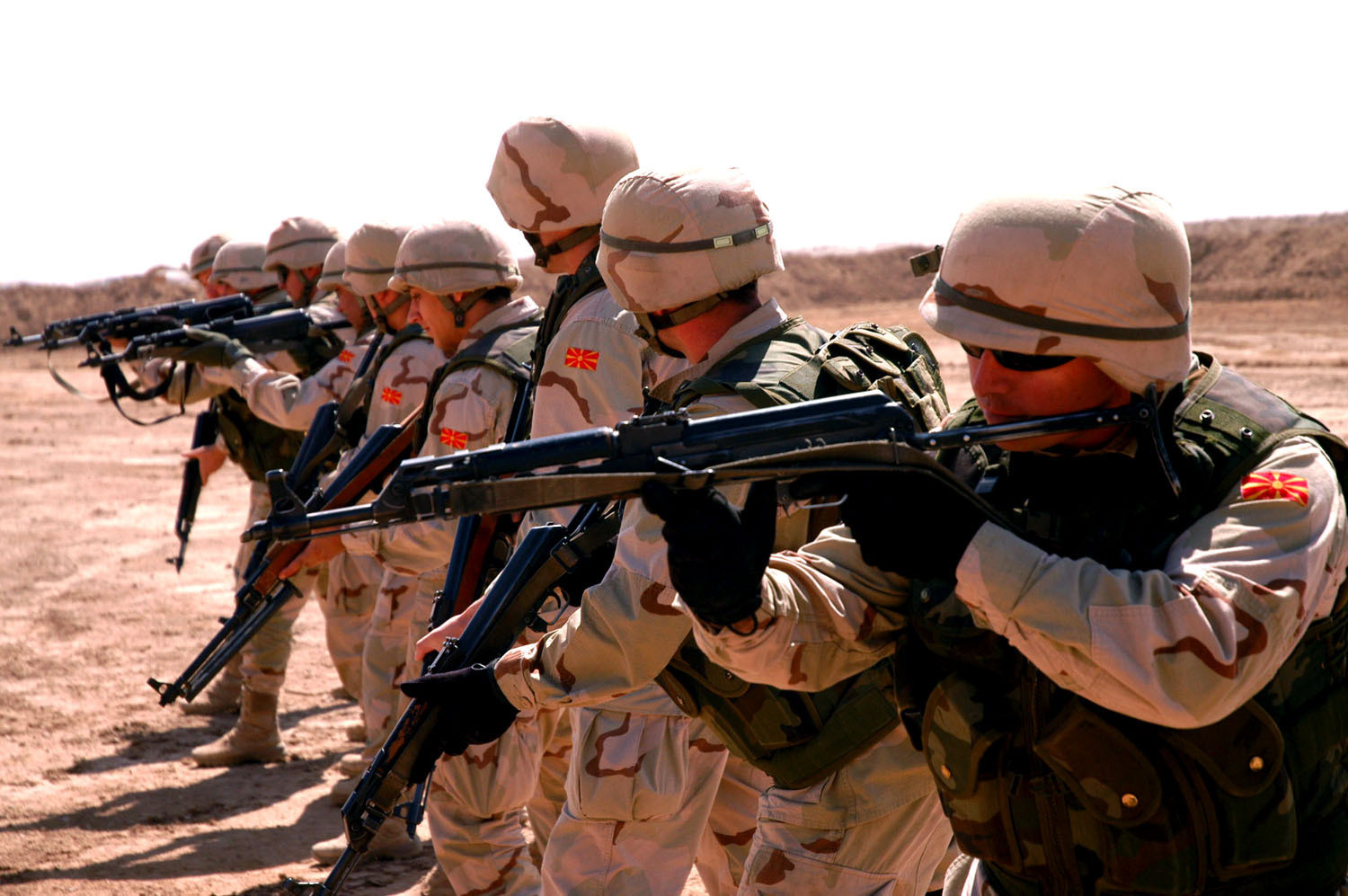
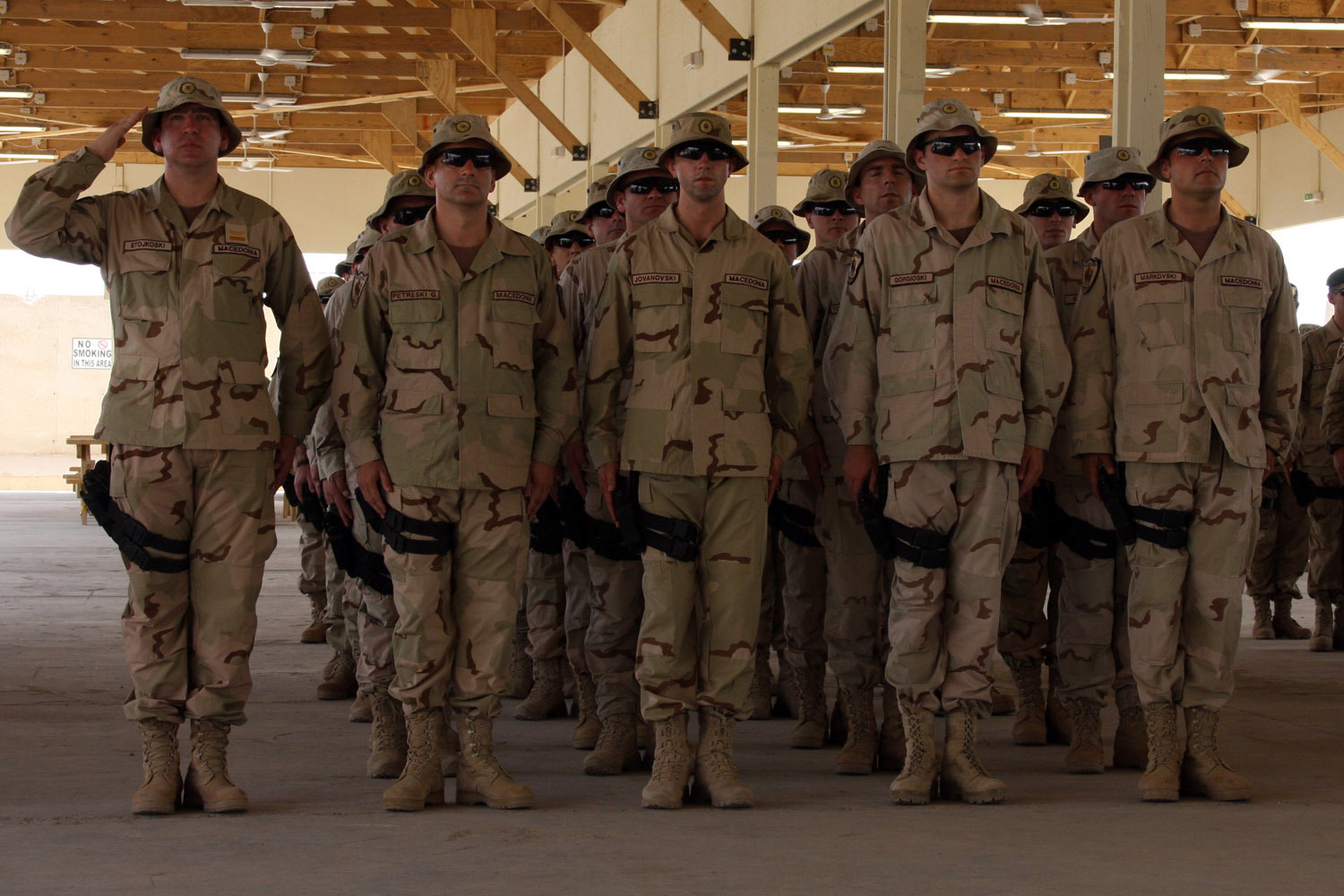
Macedonian soldiers deployed to Iraq in 2008 wearing the Desert Camouflage Uniform

=== Current ===
- Argentina: Used in a derivative camo pattern by Argentine troops in peacekeeping operations.
- Azerbaijan: Used by Azeri peacekeepers in Iraq.
- Bosnia and Herzegovina: Used by Bosnian troops in Afghanistan.
- Georgia: DCP was Main camouflage pattern employed by Georgian units in Iraq, also saw usage in opening stages of Georgian mission in Afghanistan before being replaced by MultiCam, still in limited usage by Georgian Special Operations Forces.
- Israel: Used by Israeli military in OPFOR capacity.
- Saudi Arabia

=== Former ===
- Islamic Republic of Afghanistan: Known to be used by Afghan commandos working in Task Force 444 and in CRU 222/CRU TF 24 to replace their Tiger Stripe camos.
- Croatia
- Netherlands
- North Macedonia
- Slovenia: Used until 2013, where SloCam was adopted.
- Ukraine: Limited use. Surplus donated in 2014 as part of aid during the War in Donbas
- United States
  - United States Army, replaced by the Army Combat Uniform in the late 2000s
  - United States Marine Corps, replaced by the Marine Corps Combat Utility Uniform in the mid-2000s
  - United States Navy, replaced by the Navy Working Uniform in the early 2010s
  - United States Air Force, replaced by the Airman Battle Uniform in the early 2010s
