= Ranger Challenge tab =

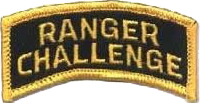
- Ranger Challenge tab
- Type: Tab
- Awarded for: Ranger Challenge Competition
- Presented by: United States Army
- Status: Currently awarded
- Final award: Current
- Related: President's Hundred tab, Special Forces tab, Ranger tab, Sapper tab

The Ranger Challenge tab is the only United States Department of the Army individual qualification tab awarded exclusively to Reserve Officers' Training Corps cadets, and approved by the Institute of Heraldry. This award is presented annually to cadets who compete in regional ROTC Ranger Challenge competitions.

== Description and history ==
Subdued Ranger Challenge tab

The Ranger Challenge tab is an embroidered quadrant patch worn on the upper left sleeve of a military uniform. The cloth tab is black with gold embroidered letters. As with similar Department of the Army decorations, this tab consists of a subdued and nonsubdued version. On the ACU uniform, the tab is worn on the left sleeve pocket flap.

The purpose of the Ranger Challenge Program is to challenge cadets with mental and physical competition, enhance leader development, develop team cohesion, develop healthy competition among the battalions, and provide a highly visible and dynamic recruiting and retention vehicle.

== Other persons eligible ==
Cadets enrolled in the Junior Reserve Officers' Training Corps are also eligible to receive this tab.

== Other tabs ==
The U.S. Army currently authorizes four permanent individual skill/marksmanship tabs. Under current Cadet Command regulation, cadets are specifically authorized to wear the Ranger tab and the Ranger Challenge tab, as well as those "approved by The Institute of Heraldry" (TIOH) Other tabs approved by TIOH include the President's Hundred tab, the Special Forces tab, and the Sapper tab. Only three may be worn at one time.

== See also ==
- Military badges of the United States
- Awards and decorations of the United States Department of the Army
- Awards and decorations of the United States Armed Forces
- List of military decorations
