= Army Combat Uniform =

Combat utility uniform of the United States Army, Air Force, and Space Force

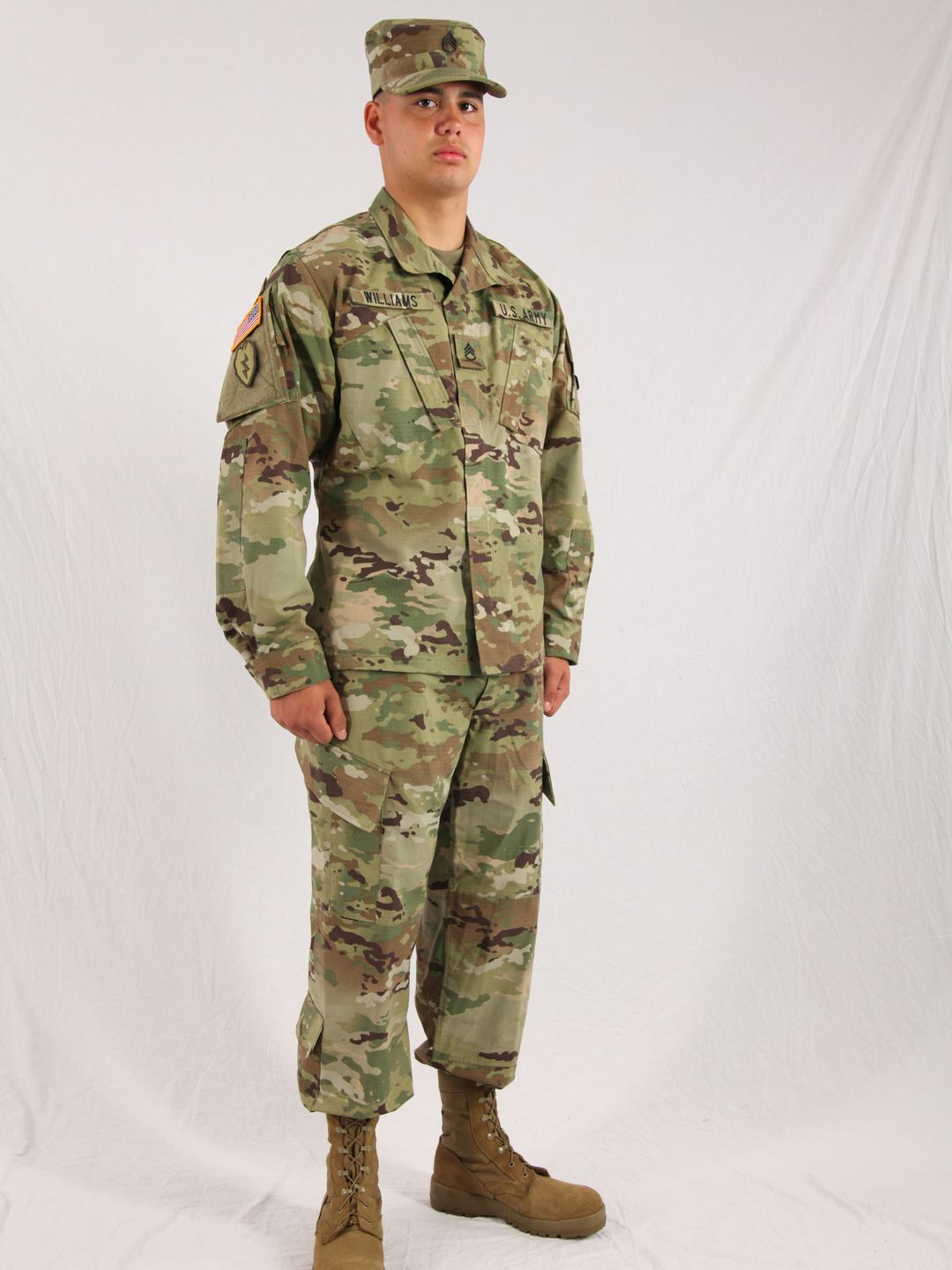
- A U.S. soldier wearing the Army Combat Uniform (ACU) in the Operational Camouflage Pattern (OCP)
- Type: Combat uniform
- Place of origin: United States

Service history
- In service: 2015–present (OCP ACU); 2009–2019 (OEF-CP ACU); 2005–2019 (UCP ACU) (Note: Prototypes tested from 2004 to 2005.)
- Used by: U.S. Army; U.S. Air Force; U.S. Space Force; U.S. Navy (SEALs and individual augmentees); U.S. Coast Guard (SMTC/DSF); U.S. Department of Defense (civilians and contractors); State Defense Forces (multiple states); Civil Air Patrol
- Wars: War in Afghanistan; Iraq War; Operation Inherent Resolve; Russo-Ukrainian War

Production history
- Designed: 2004 (UCP ACU); 2008 (OEF-CP ACU); 2014 (OCP ACU)
- Variants: Hot Weather Combat Uniform

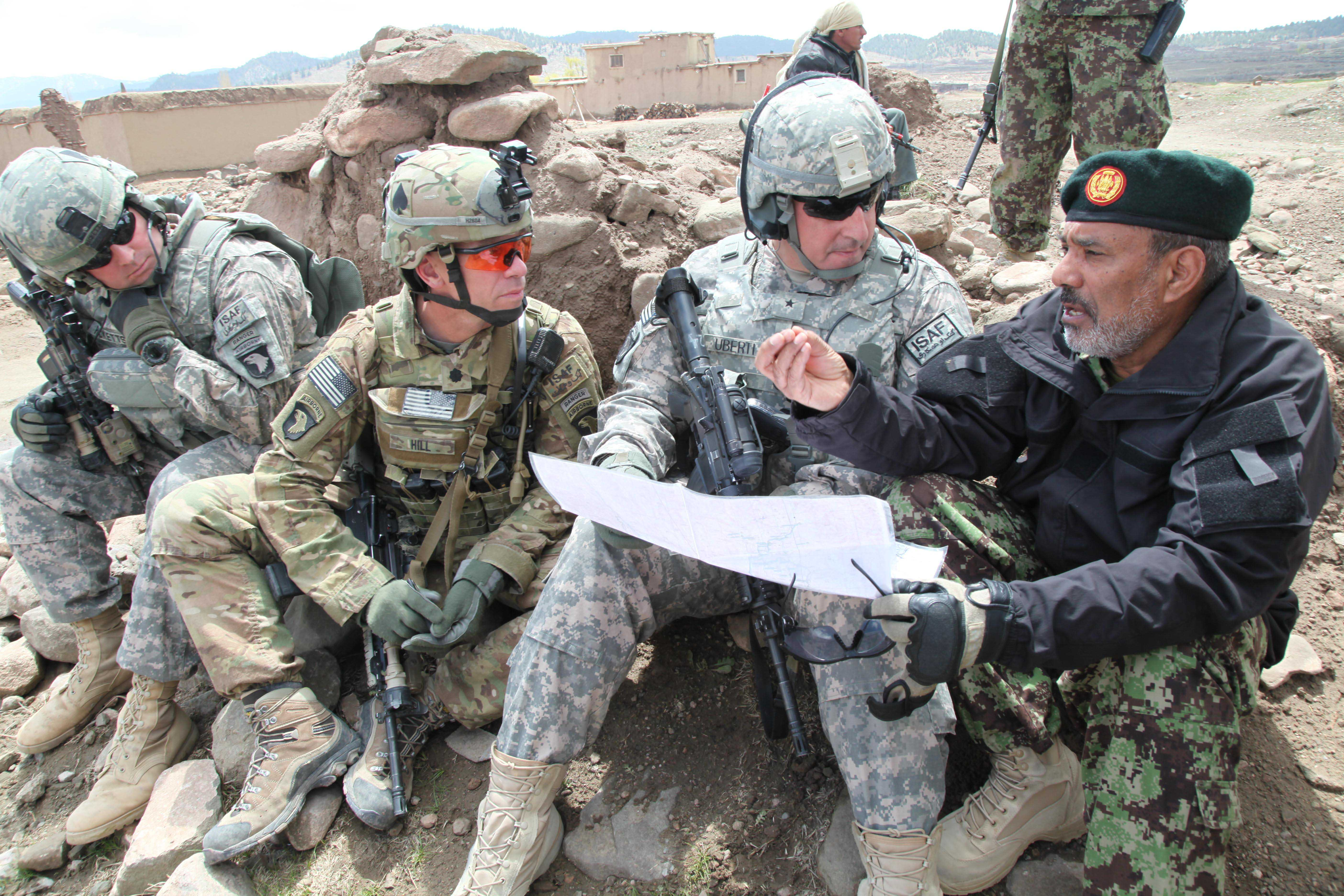
101st Airborne soldiers in May 2011, wearing the ACU in the Universal Camouflage Pattern, along with its replacement OEF-CP MultiCam pattern (second from left) in Paktika province, Afghanistan

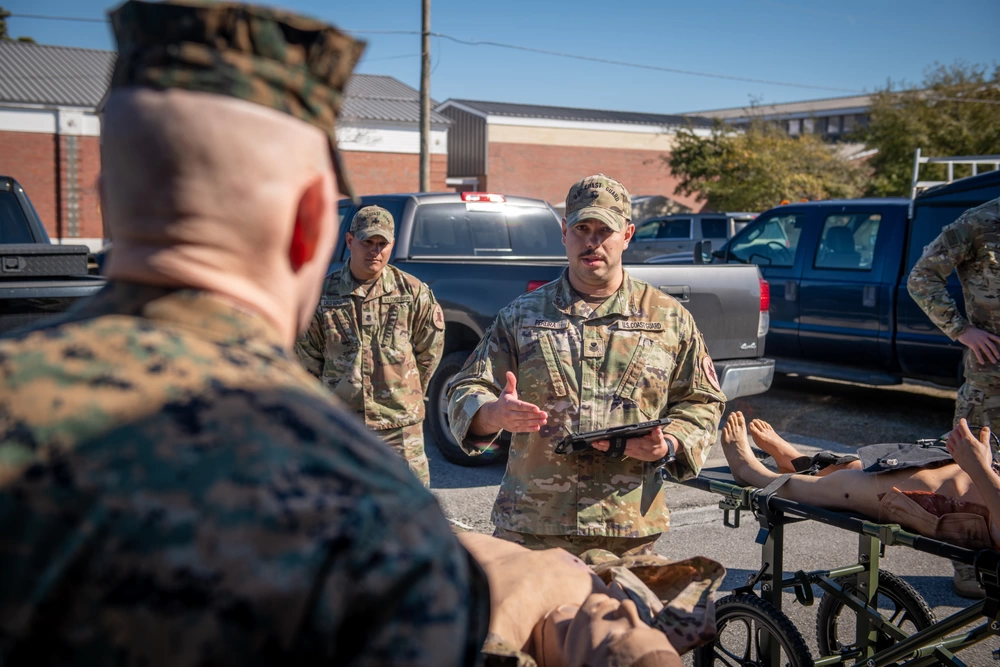
USCG Deployable Specialized Forces personnel wearing the ACU in the Operational Camouflage Pattern

The Army Combat Uniform (ACU) is the current combat uniform worn by the United States Army, U.S. Air Force, U.S. Space Force and some elements of the U.S. Coast Guard. Within the Air Force and Space Force, it is referred to as the OCP (Operational Camouflage Pattern) Uniform, rather than the Army Combat Uniform.

First unveiled in June 2004, it is the successor to the Battle Dress Uniform (BDU) and Desert Camouflage Uniform (DCU) worn from the 1980s and 1990s through to the mid-2000s, respectively. It is also the successor to the Airman Battle Uniform for the U.S. Air Force. Initially, it was made with the Universal Camouflage Pattern (UCP), but due to its ineffectiveness it was replaced by the Operational Camouflage Pattern (OCP).

== History ==
=== Development ===
In early 2004, some U.S. Army soldiers in Iraq were issued the "Close Combat Uniform", a variant of the Desert Camouflage Uniform (DCU) that featured new features such as shoulder pockets affixed with hook-and-loop fasteners, chest-worn rank insignia, and a new collar. The experimental features used on the CCU were eventually incorporated into the ACU, which was publicly announced in June 2004.

=== Initial fielding ===
The process of replacing the U.S. Army's BDUs and DCUs with the ACU was set to begin in April 2005. However, the fielding process began two months earlier through the Rapid Fielding Initiative. Soldiers from the Georgia Army National Guard's 48th Infantry Brigade Combat Team were the first in the U.S. Army to receive the ACU, subsequently deploying with them into Iraq in May 2005. Early ACUs can be distinguished by OG-green name tapes, combat and skill badges, and shoulder sleeve insignia. Due to the increased use of Improvised Explosive Devices (IEDs), a flame-resistant version of the ACU was developed for soldiers deploying overseas, especially to Iraq.

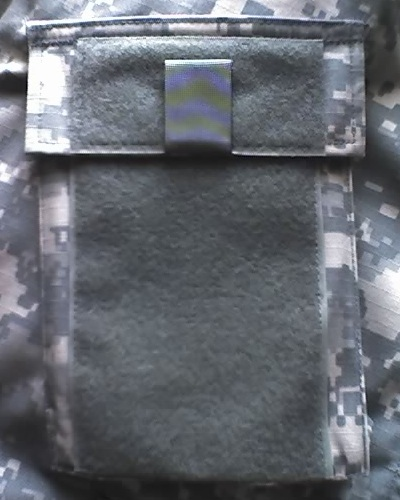
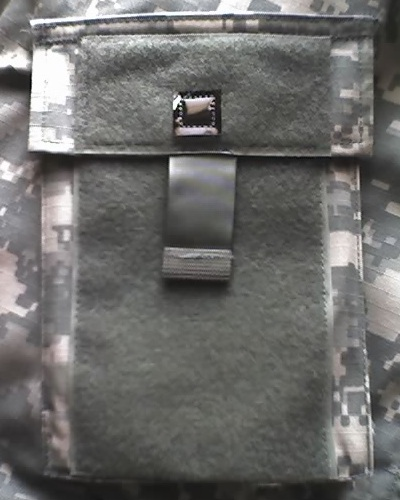
The ACU's infrared tab, closed (left) and opened (right)

=== Universal Camouflage Pattern (UCP) ===
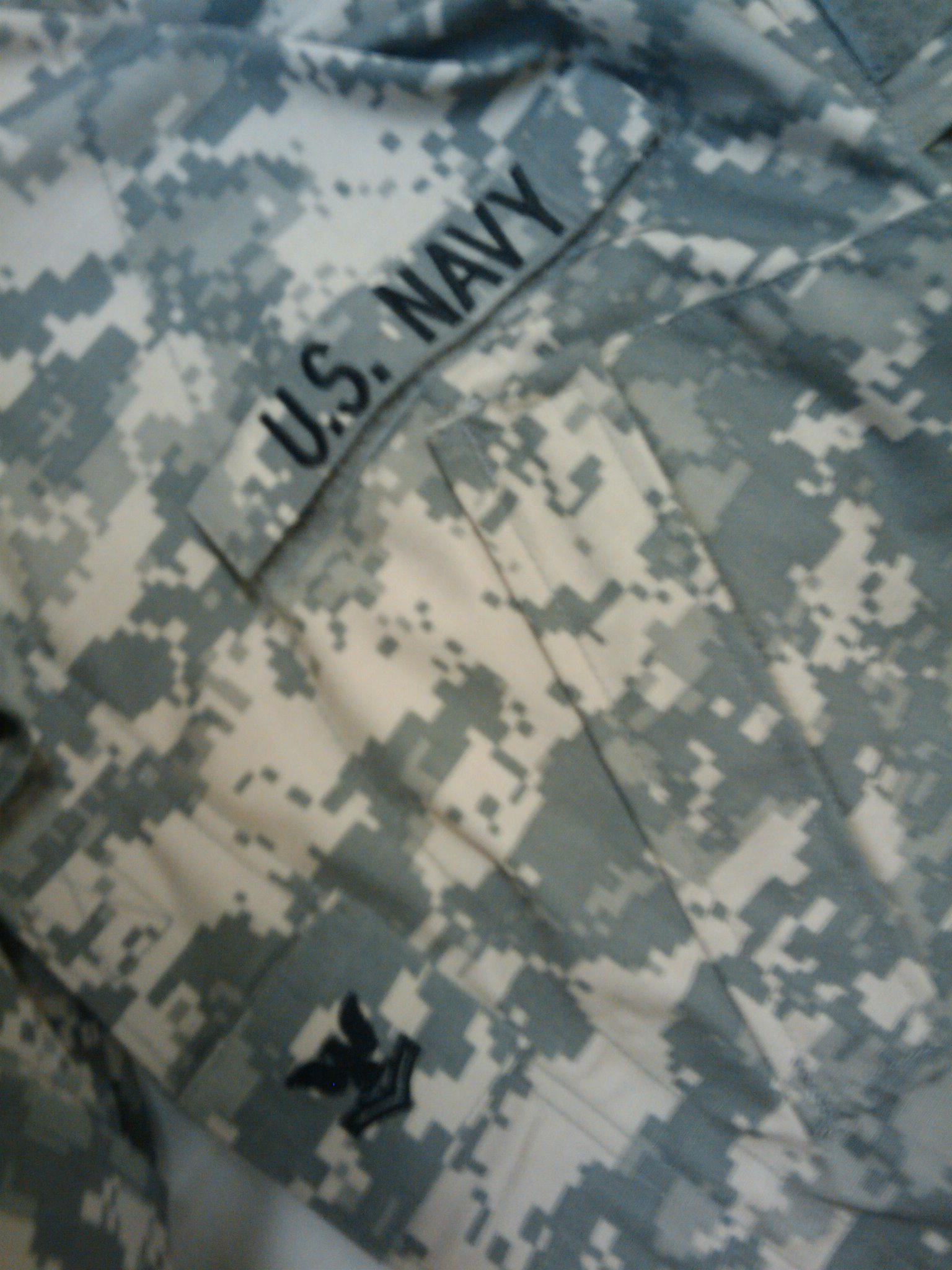
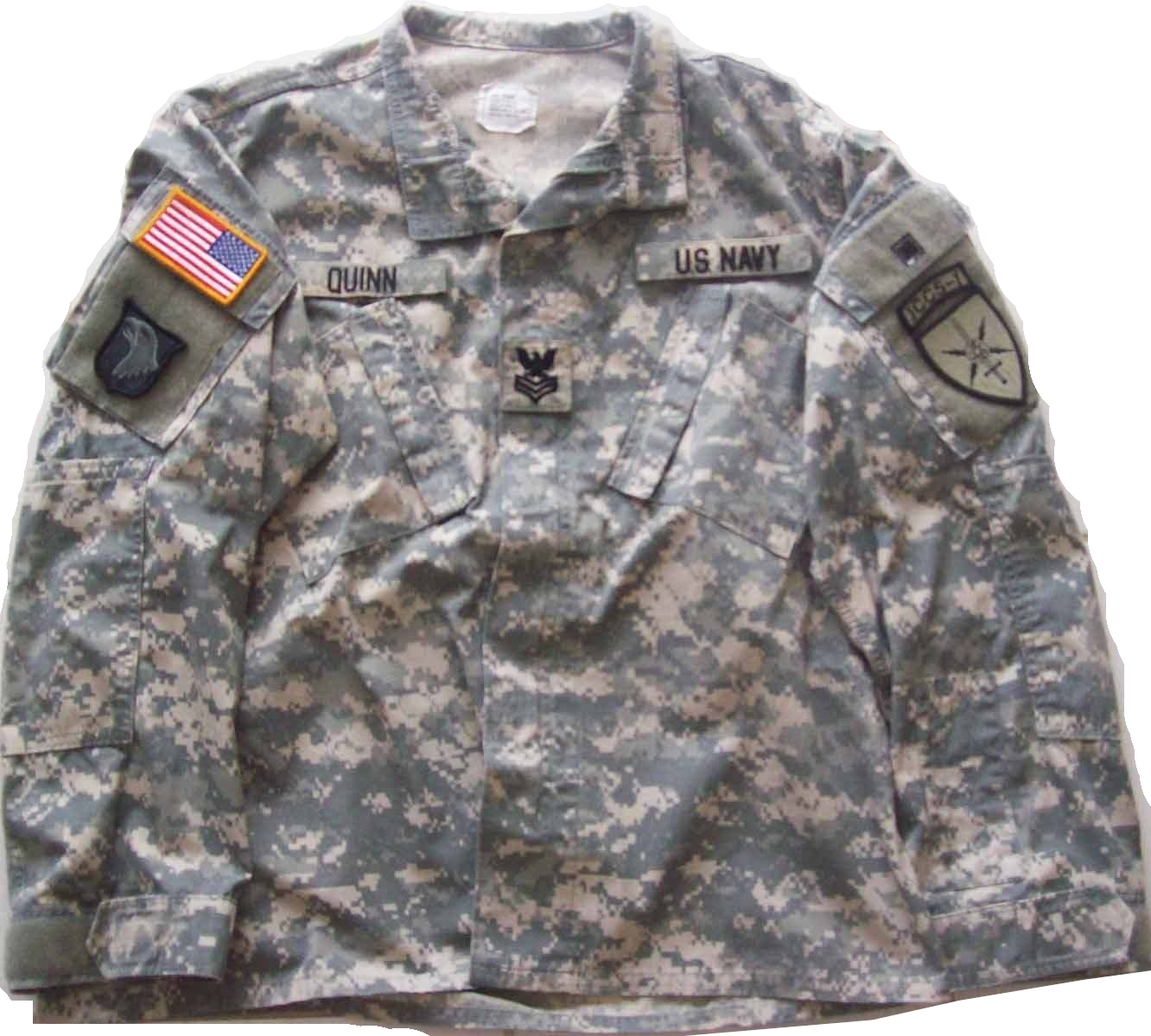
The ACU blouses of U.S. Navy sailors attached to a U.S. Army unit during the Iraq War, c. 2009.

The ACU originally used the Universal Camouflage Pattern (UCP), which used a pixelated pattern of tan, gray and green (Desert Sand 500, Urban Gray 501 and Foliage Green 502) and was intended to work in desert, woodland, and urban environments. In 2010, the ACU received some improvements to pockets and such.

For uniforms, the pattern was fully phased out and replaced by the Operational Camouflage Pattern on September 30, 2019, though UCP remains in service in limited capacities such as on some cold weather overgear and older body armor.

=== Operation Enduring Freedom Pattern (MultiCam) ===
Beginning in late 2010 U.S. Army soldiers deployed to Afghanistan (starting with the 173rd Airborne Brigade) were issued ACUs made in Crye Precision's MultiCam pattern, referred to by the army as the Operation Enduring Freedom Pattern (OEF, OEF-CP, or OCP), which was far more effective for use in Afghanistan's terrain. The flame-retardant variants of the uniforms are designed to prevent third-degree burns, along with up to thirty percent of second degree burns. Additionally, all uniforms are treated with the chemical permethrin to help protect soldiers from ticks and insects. Some U.S. Army soldiers during the latter stages of the Iraq War also wore the OEF-patterned ACU; some were seen wearing them as late as December 2011, when the United States withdrew its military forces from the country at the end of the war. The MultiCam-patterned ACUs were retired in 2019 with the UCP-patterned ones.

=== Operational Camouflage Pattern (OCP) ===
In May 2014, the Army unofficially announced that the Operational Camouflage Pattern (OCP) would replace UCP on the ACU. The original "Scorpion" pattern was developed at United States Army Soldier Systems Center by Crye Precision in 2002 for the Objective Force Warrior program. Crye later modified and trademarked their version of the pattern as MultiCam, which was selected for use by U.S. soldiers and airmen in Afghanistan in 2010 as the Operation Enduring Freedom Pattern. After talks to officially adopt MultiCam broke down over costs in late 2013, the Army began experimenting with the original Scorpion pattern, creating a variant code named "Scorpion W2". The pattern resembles MultiCam with muted greens, light beige, and dark brown colors, but uses fewer beige and brown patches and no vertical twig and branch elements. On July 31, 2014, the Army formally announced that the pattern would begin being issued in uniforms in summer 2015. The official name is intended to emphasize its use beyond Afghanistan to all combatant commands. The OCP pattern fully replaced the UCP pattern on the ACU by October 1, 2019. ACUs printed in OCP first became available for purchase on July 1, 2015, with deployed soldiers already being issued uniforms and equipment in the new pattern.

The U.S. Air Force has also adopted the ACU, which they call the OCP uniform, from 2018 onward, and it replaced the Airman Battle Uniform by April 2021. The Air Force version differs only in name tapes and rank being embroidered in spice brown thread instead of black. The U.S. Space Force has also adopted the OCP Uniform, but with blue thread for ranks and tapes. The Civil Air Patrol, civilian auxiliary of the U.S. Air Force, has also been granted authorization to wear the OCP uniform with distinctive dark blue tapes, full color patches and a mandatory duty identifier.

== Components ==
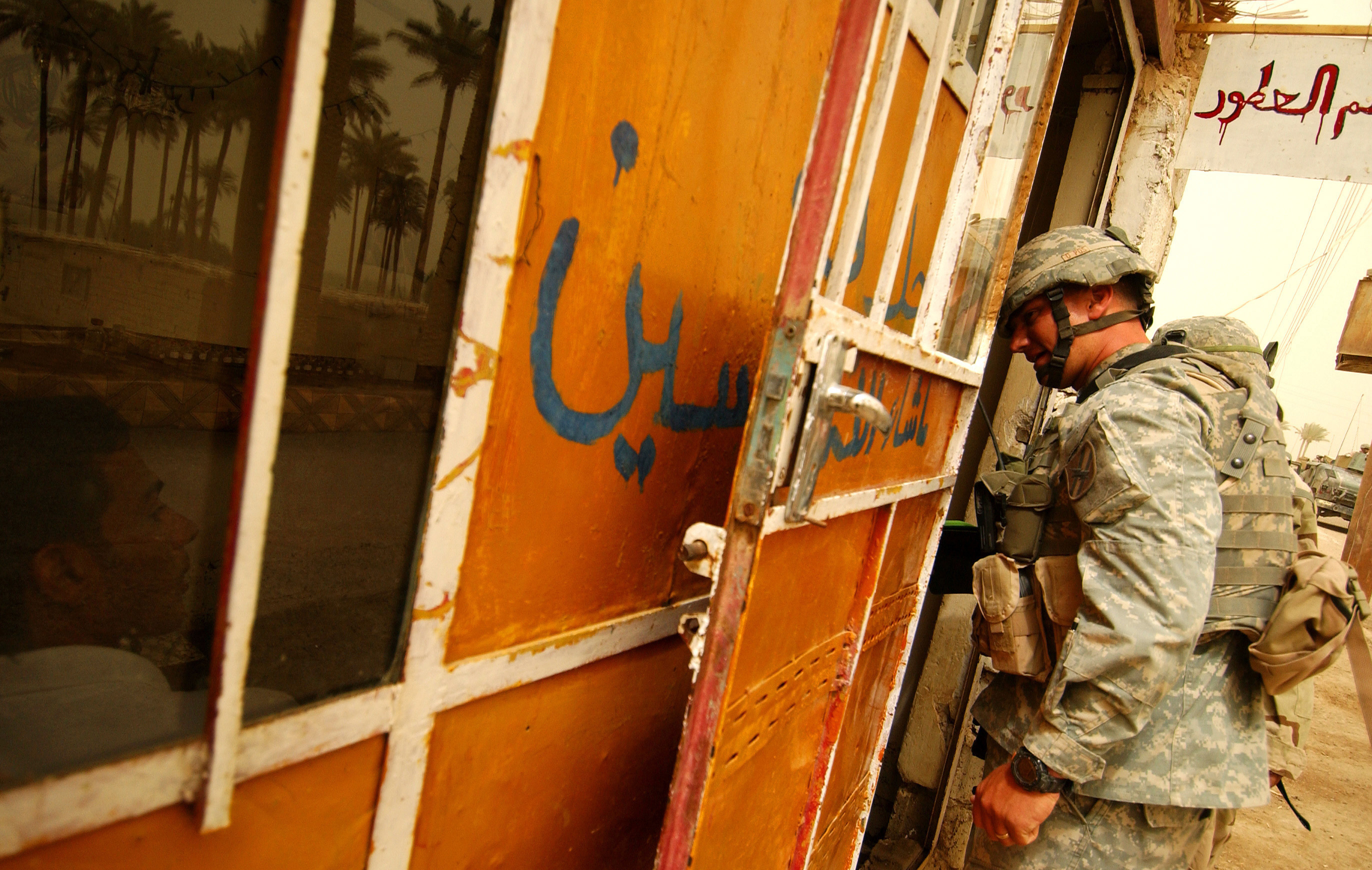
A U.S. Army soldier in June 2005 wearing the ACU in UCP with matching IBA vest and ACH helmet

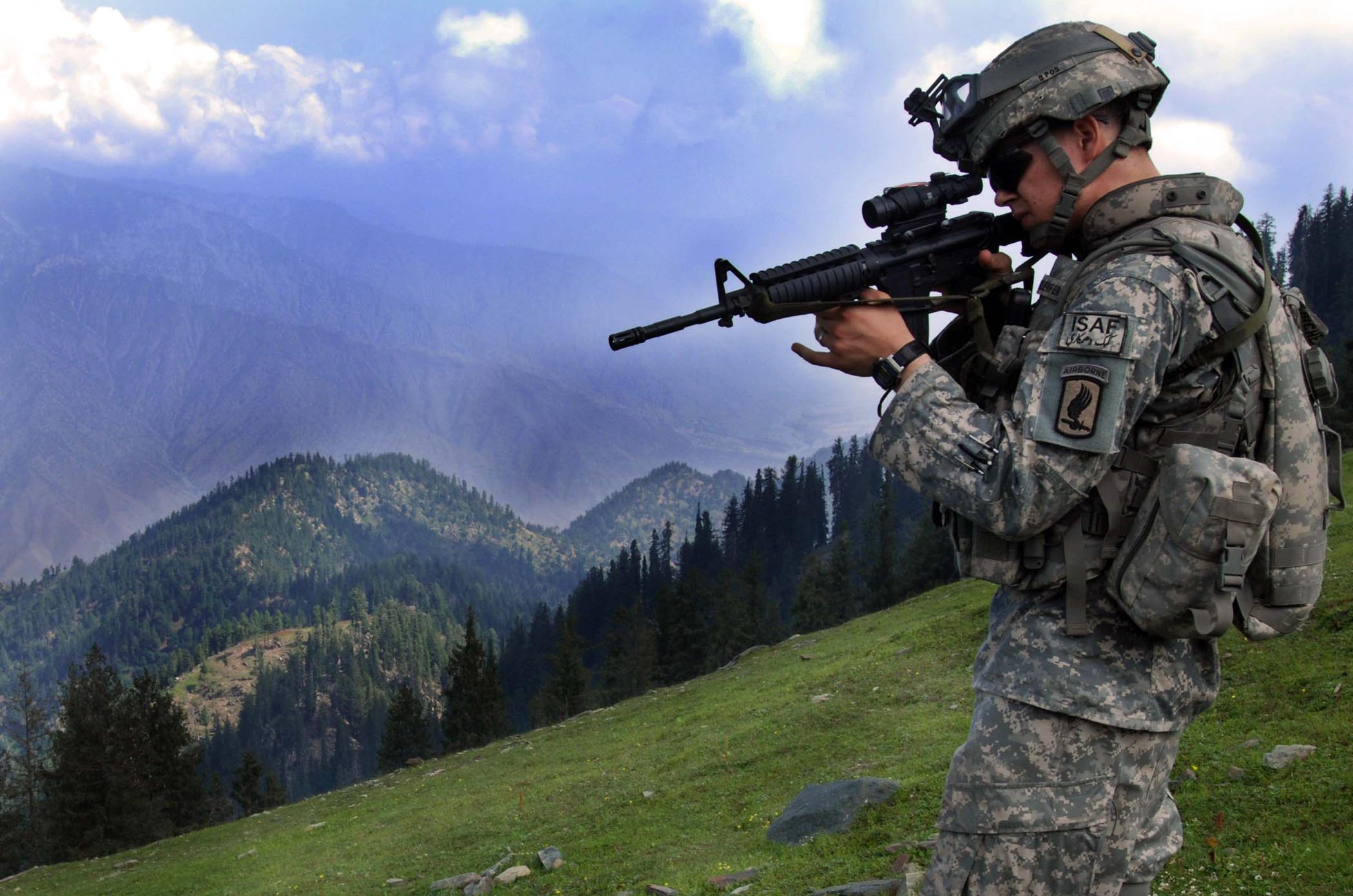
A 173rd Airborne Brigade soldier in Kunar province, Afghanistan, during Operation Saray in April 2006

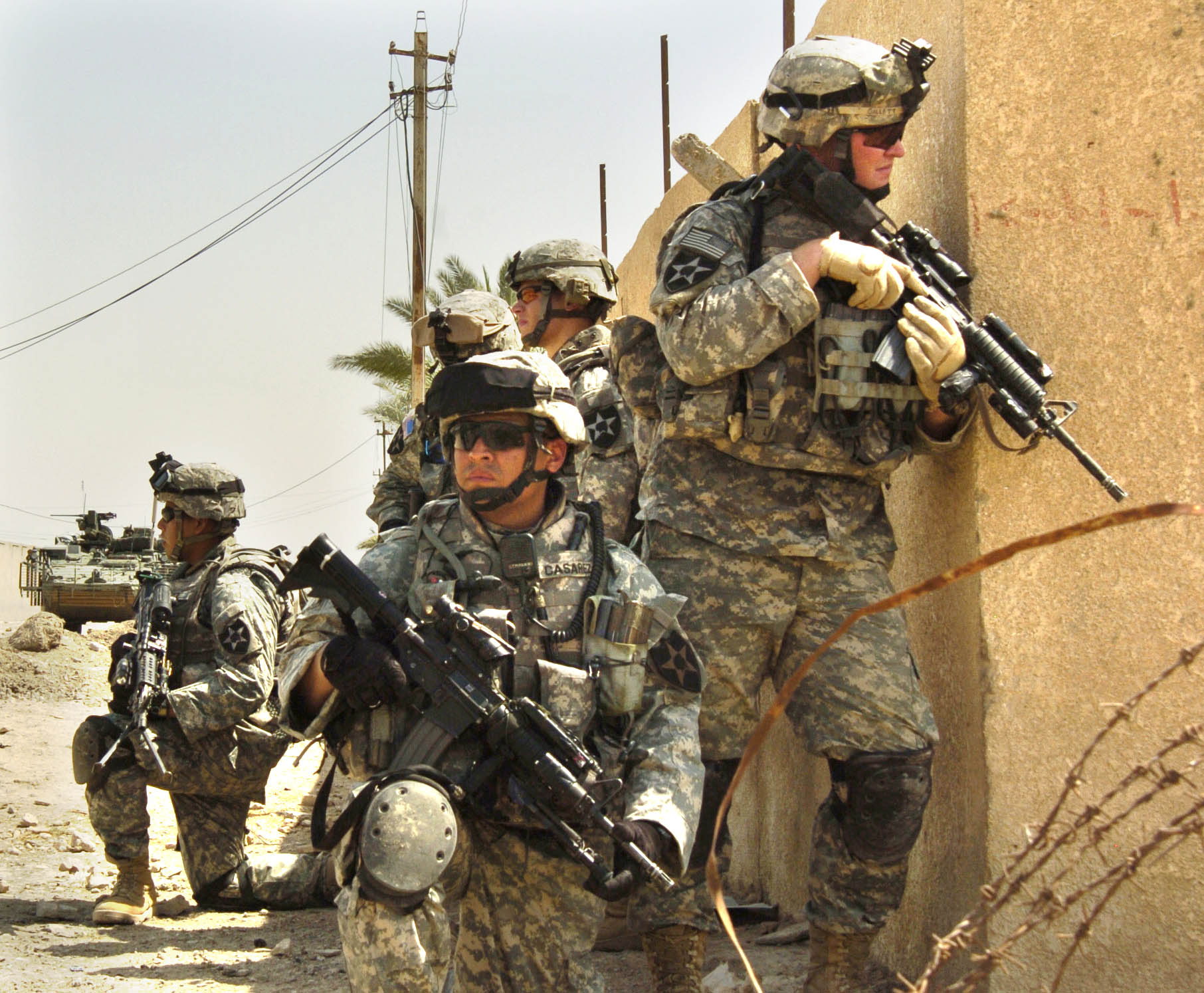
U.S. Army soldiers from the 2nd Infantry Division wearing the ACU and Interceptor body armor while on patrol in the streets of Baghdad during the Iraq War in August 2006

=== Jacket ===
The ACU jacket (or blouse) originally used hook-and-loop fasteners, also known by the genericized trademark Velcro, on its sleeve pockets, and to secure attachments such as name tapes, rank insignia, shoulder patches and tabs, as well as recognition devices like the U.S. flag patch and the infrared (IR) tab. Originally, only pin-on skill badges were authorized for wear on the ACU, with no more than five at any one time, from 2006 until 2011.

In the summer of 2011, regulations were changed to allow for wearing of sew-on embroidered skill badges, similar in cut to the kind worn on the Battle Dress Uniform (BDU). The five-badge limit remained in effect, and there could be no mixing of sew-on and pin-on badges. At the same time, the branch tape, name tapes, and rank insignia could be sewn-on at the wearer's preference. Skill tabs, such as the President's Hundred Tab, Special Forces, Ranger, and Sapper are worn on the left sleeve pocket flap, and are subject to a three-tab-only rule. A tab that is an integral part of a unit patch, such as the "Mountain" or "Airborne" tab, is not counted against the rule. The U.S. Army Chaplain insignia is the only authorized army branch insignia to be worn on the ACU. It is centered 1/8 inch above the right name tape. The insignia may be the metal pin-on variety or the black embroidered insignia on digitized fabric with Velcro fasteners.

Near Infrared (NIR) Signature Management Technology is incorporated to minimize the infrared silhouette. Permanent IR IFF squares are sewn to each shoulder to help identify friendly personnel when night vision devices are used, and are protected by Velcro tabs in garrison or when not in use. Three U.S. flag insignia are authorized for wear with the ACU: full-color, full-color infrared, and subdued infrared. The U.S. flag insignia is worn on the right shoulder pocket flap of the ACU coat. The subdued version is only worn as directed under tactical or field conditions in the Army, while the Air Force only authorizes the subdued flag. Subdued shoulder sleeve insignia are worn. The flag's stars appear in the top right as a symbolic gesture; the insignia "flies" in that direction because the soldier is moving forward and not retreating.

The jacket's Mandarin collar was intended to be worn up in combat to fit with the Interceptor body armor outer tactical vest (OTV) to keep out debris, and worn in the down position otherwise. With the change of pattern to OCP, the Velcro tab that closed the Mandarin collar was removed, along with other Velcro closures. The front closure is zippered and reinforced with Velcro, designed for use with OTV. The tilted chest pockets, cuffs, and elbow pad insert pockets also utilize hook-and-loop closure. There is a three-slot pen pocket on the left arm of the jacket, and blouse bellows for increased mobility. The jacket is worn so that its bottom is between the bottom of the pocket and the top of the cargo pocket. In the field, the jacket may be replaced by the flame-resistant Army Combat Shirt when worn directly under the IOTV.

=== Trousers ===
The ACU trousers (or ACU pants) are worn with a two-inch nylon web belt, and feature Velcro pouches for knee pad inserts, two forward-tilted thigh storage pockets with elastic drawstring and Velcro for closure during movement, and two calf storage pockets, one on each pant leg, with a Velcro closure. ACU trousers with flame-resistant materials are being issued for use in Iraq and Afghanistan.

The updates to the ACU trousers in late 2010 included removal of Velcro fasteners from forward-tilted thigh cargo pocket flaps, which were replaced with three buttons. This change was introduced gradually from 2009 onward and is now in full effect. Two buttons are standard (same function as on BDU trouser cargo pockets), while the third button located at the very end of the pocket can be used to allow for more load and extra volume in cargo pockets. On the small calf pockets the 3-piece Velcro (two square hook on pocket and one rectangular loop patch on the flap) have been replaced with a single button in 2012. Buttons were re-introduced and replaced Velcro on pockets after numerous complaints from soldiers in the field.

Further changes as part of the transition to OCP removed the pockets for insertable knee pads altogether, along with the replacement of more Velcro with buttons. To be able to differentiate the Fire-Retardant ACU (FRACU) from the regular ACU at a distance, a small one-square-inch tan patch is affixed to the left sleeve cuff on the jacket and the middle of the left cargo pocket flap on the trousers.

=== Headgear ===
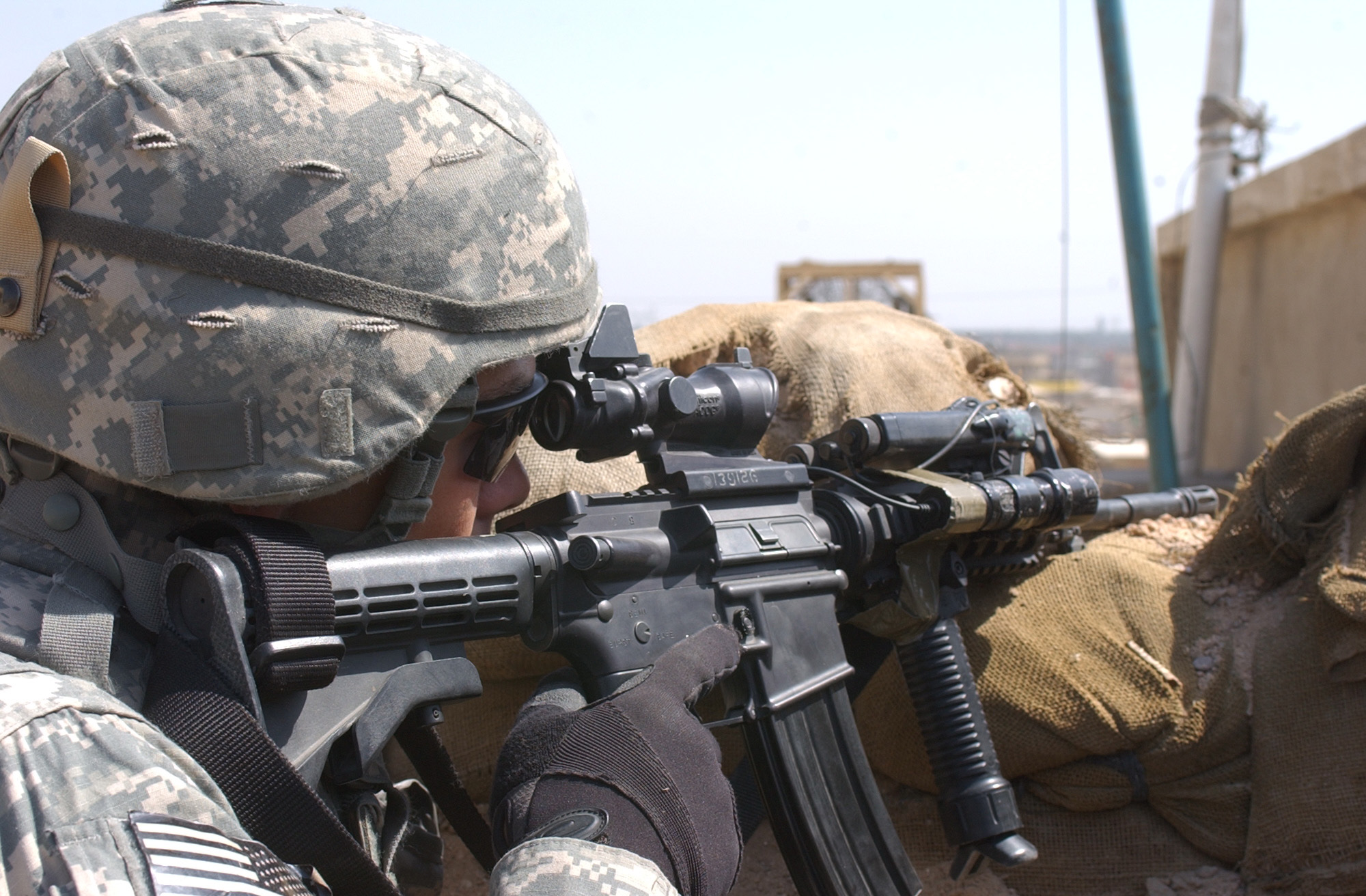
A U.S. Army soldier in March 2007 wears an ACH and ACU with a UCP camouflage cover during the Iraq War

Typically, the ACU is worn with the Advanced Combat Helmet (ACH), a patrol cap, or a boonie hat and/or fleece cap as appropriate in winter months. The patrol cap is a kepi-styled straight-sided, flat-topped soft cap, with a double thick bill and internal pocket. When in garrison, the maroon, tan, brown, and green berets may be worn by paratroopers, rangers, advisors, and special forces, respectively. The green micro fleece cap is authorized for field and garrison use outside of unit PT, per local command. A name tape is worn on the back of the patrol cap. Sew-on rank is recommended, but pin-on rank is authorized on the ACU Patrol Cap and ACU Boonie Hat. The MICH (Modular Integrated Communications Helmet) Camouflage cover rank must be sewn on if worn but is often not used, as the night vision device mount would obstruct it.

=== T-shirt ===
The ACU's UCP variant was typically worn with a moisture-wicking sand colored T-shirt. A Tan 499 T-shirt was authorized with the ACU's OCP variant and became the sole authorized T-shirt upon completion of the full transition to OCP in 2019. A flame-resistant green shirt is authorized for the Army Aircrew Combat Uniform (AACU).

=== Footwear ===
The UCP variant of the ACU was worn with tan Army Combat Boots and olive drab cotton socks. Commercial versions of this boot are authorized without limitation, complying with the following regulations—must be 8 to 10 inches in height, be made of tan rough side out cattle hide leather with a plain toe and tan rubber outsoles, and be without zippers, metal cleats, or side tabs. The Mountain Combat Boot is available for difficult terrain, and the Extreme Cold Vapor Barrier Boots for cold weather. As with the T-shirt, coyote brown boots are authorized with ACU-OCP and will become the sole boot authorized following the completion of the transition in 2019.

== See also ==
- Airman Battle Uniform
- Marine Corps Combat Utility Uniform
- Navy Working Uniform
- List of military clothing camouflage patterns
- Uniforms of the United States Army
- Army Service Uniform
- Army Elements Fleece
- VKPO - Russian equivalent
