= President's Hundred tab =

The President's Hundred tab/brassard
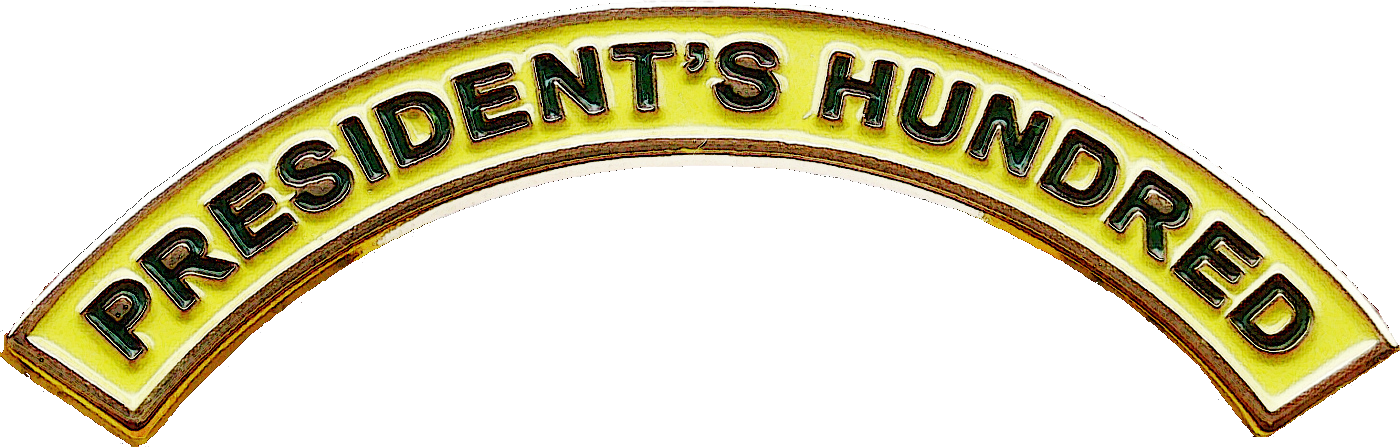
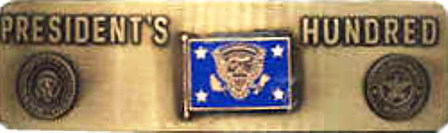
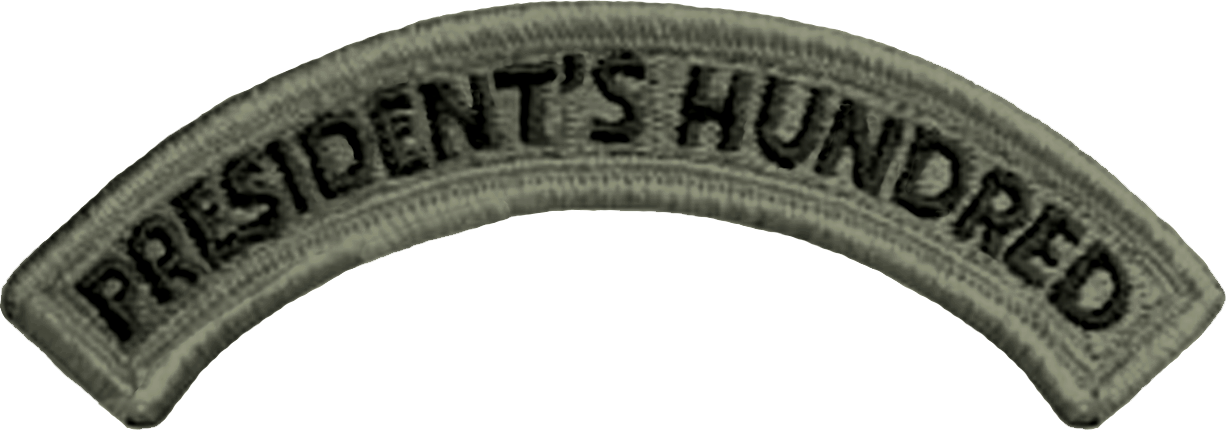
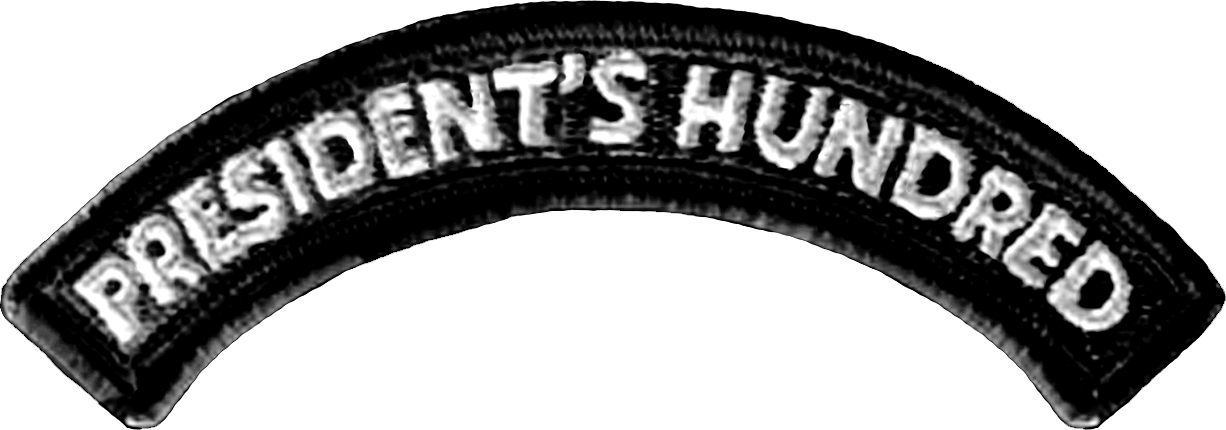
- 1st: Army/Air Force metallic badge variant 2nd: Army color shoulder sleeve variant 3rd: Army/Air Force subdued shoulder sleeve variant 4th: Coast Guard shoulder sleeve variant 5th: Navy shoulder sleeve variant
- Type: Tab
- Awarded for: Awarded to the 100 top-scoring military and civilian shooters in the President's Pistol and President's Rifle Matches.
- Presented by: Civilian Marksmanship Program
- Status: Currently awarded
- Related: Marksmanship badges (United States)

Earning the President's Hundred tab (1:42)
US Army video with the Army Combat Uniform version of the tab visible

The President's Hundred tab/brassard is a badge awarded by the Civilian Marksmanship Program (CMP) to the 100 top-scoring military and civilian shooters in the President's Pistol and President's Rifle Matches.

The tab is authorized for wear on military uniforms of the U.S. Army, U.S. Air Force, and U.S. Coast Guard (enlisted only). The brassard version is authorized for wear on enlisted uniforms of the U.S. Navy.

== History ==
In 1878, the seven-year-old National Rifle Association of America added to its annual matches the American Military Rifle Championship Match. It was patterned after the Queen's Prize, a competition for British Volunteers launched by the British National Rifle Association in 1860 with a £250 prize donated by Queen Victoria for the winner.

In 1884, the name was changed to the President's Match for the Military Rifle Championship of the United States. It was fired at Creedmoor, New York, until 1891. In 1895, it was reintroduced at Sea Girt, New Jersey.

The tradition of making a letter from the President of the United States the first prize began in 1904, when President Theodore Roosevelt wrote a letter of congratulations to the winner, Private Howard Gensch of the 1st Regiment of Infantry of the New Jersey National Guard.

The match was not held during World War I. It appears to have ceased during the Great Depression for lack of funds.

The President's Match was reinstated in 1957 at the National Matches as "The President's Hundred." The 100 top-scoring competitors were recognized in a retreat ceremony in which they passed in review before the winner and former winners of the match.

On 27 May 1958, the NRA asked the U.S. military to approve a tab with a metal brassard for presentation to each member of the "President's Hundred." The cloth tab was approved for wear on the uniform on 3 March 1958, although only the U.S. Navy has authorized the wear of the metal brassard on the uniforms of enlisted sailors. The award was first issued at Camp Perry, Ohio, in early September 1958. The NRA issued the metal brassard to all military and civilian personnel for wear on a shooting jacket.

In 1977, the National Board for the Promotion of Rifle Practice (NBPRP) assumed responsibility for the President's Match from the NRA. Today the CMP holds the National Matches and awards the President's Hundred tab/brassard to the top 100 shooters in those matches.

== Other tabs ==
The President's Hundred Tab is one of five permanent individual skill/marksmanship tabs (as compared to a badge) authorized for wear by the U.S. Army. In order of precedence on the uniform, they are the President's Hundred tab, the Special Forces tab, the Ranger tab, the Sapper tab and the Jungle tab. Only three may be worn at one time.

== See also ==
- Marksmanship badges (United States)
- Tabs of the United States Army
- Badges of the United States Coast Guard
- Badges of the United States Navy
