= Special Forces Tab =

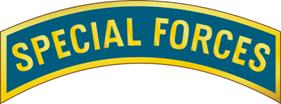
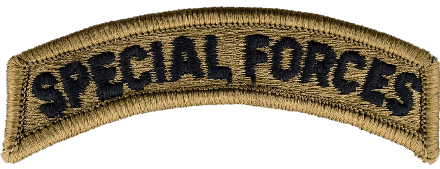
- 1st: Miniature metallic badge variant 2nd: Army Service Uniform variant 3rd: Army Combat Uniform variant
- Type: Tab
- Awarded for: Graduation from the Special Forces Qualification Course
- Presented by: United States Army
- Status: Currently awarded
- Established: 1983

Precedence
- Next (higher): Ranger Tab
- Next (lower): Sapper Tab

Earning the Special Forces Tab (2:28)
Official U.S. Army video about the Special Forces Tab

The Special Forces Tab is a service school qualification tab of the United States Army, awarded to any soldier completing the Special Forces Qualification Course at the U.S. Army John F. Kennedy Special Warfare Center and School, Fort Bragg, North Carolina. Soldiers who are awarded the Special Forces Tab are authorized to wear it for the remainder of their military careers, even when not serving in a Special Forces command.

Because it is longer than the other qualification tabs, it is called the "long tab". Personnel who have earned it are nicknamed "long tabbers".

== Description and history ==
The Special Forces Tab was created in 1983 and is an embroidered quadrant patch worn on the upper left sleeve of a military uniform. The cloth tab is 3 1/4 inches wide, 3/4-inch high, and is teal blue with gold-yellow embroidered letters. A metal Special Forces Badge is authorized for wear on mess/dress (1" wide) and class-B uniforms (1 9/16" wide). The metal badge is teal blue with a gold edge and gold letters.

At the time of its creation, the Special Forces Tab was retroactively awarded to any Army soldiers previously Special Forces-qualified. In addition, as set forth in Army regulations, veterans of certain categories of former wartime service are also eligible for retroactive awards of the tab. Among these are:

- Personnel who served with a Special Forces unit during wartime between 1942 and 1973 and were either unable to or not required to attend a formal program of instruction but were awarded the proper Special Qualification Identifier by a competent authority. U.S. Army Warrant Officers are excluded.
- Personnel with at least 120 days' wartime service prior to 1955 in certain units, including the 1st Special Service Force, OSS Detachment 101, OSS Jedburgh teams, OSS Operational Groups, and the Sixth Army Special Reconnaissance Unit ("Alamo Scouts") and 8240th Army Unit.
- Officer or Enlisted personnel of rank O-3 and below awarded the Combat Infantryman Badge or Combat Medical Badge while serving at least 120 consecutive days between 1955 and 1975 in a Special Forces Operational Detachment-Alpha (A-Team), Mobile Strike Force, SF Reconnaissance Team or SF Special Project Unit. Does not apply to U.S. Army Warrant Officers.

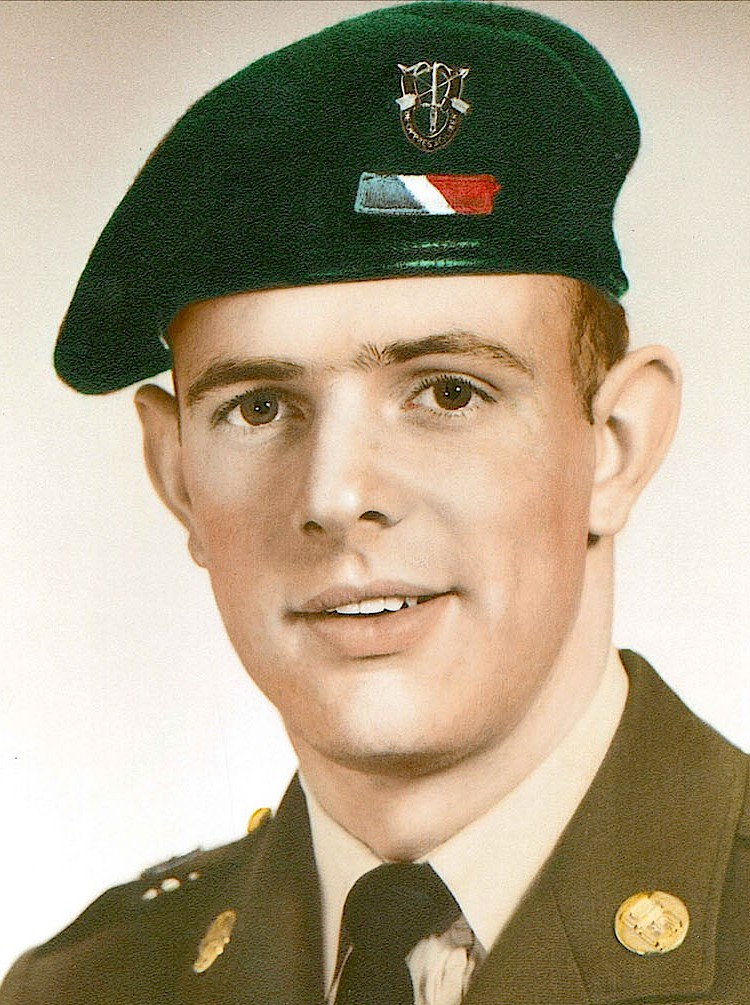
A non-special forces qualified paratrooper with the 11th Special Forces Group wearing green beret with the 1st Special Forces Regiment DUI and unit recognition bar, c. 1967

Before the creation of the Special Forces Tab, Special Forces qualification was indicated by wearing a full-size unit-specific beret flash on their green beret. A support soldier (such as military intelligence, signals, parachute riggers, vehicle mechanics, etc.) assigned to a Special Forces unit wore a 1/4" high recognition bar (nicknamed a "half flash," "striker bar," or "candy stripe") below the Special Forces Distinctive Unit Insignia (DUI), officer rank insignia, or chaplain branch insignia on their green beret. The bar was designed to match the colors and design of their unit's full-size beret flash. After the creation of the tab in 1983 and until January 1993, all personnel in a Special Forces unit wore the same beret and beret flash. Today, only Special Forces-qualified soldiers wear the green beret, with support soldiers wearing maroon berets, making the need for the recognition bar moot.

== Award Eligibility ==
Award eligibility as follows:

- 1) Basic Eligibility Criteria. Any person meeting one of the criteria below may be awarded the Special Forces (SF) tab:
  - 1.1) Successful completion of U.S. Army John F. Kennedy Special Warfare Center and School (SWCS) approved Active Army (AA) institutional training leading to SF qualification.
  - 1.2) Successful completion of a SWCS approved Reserve Component (RC) SF qualification program.
  - 1.3) Successful completion of an authorized unit-administered SF qualification program.
- 2) Active Component institutional training. The SF Tab may be awarded to all personnel who meet the following:
  - 2.1) For successful completion of the Special Forces Qualification Course or Special Forces Detachment Officer Qualification Course (previously known as the Special Forces Officer Course). These courses are/were conducted by the SWCS (previously known as the U.S. Army Institute for Military Assistance).
  - 2.2) Prior to 1 January 1988, for successful completion of the then approved program of instruction for Special Forces qualification in a Special Forces Group, who were subsequently awarded, by competent authority, SQI "S" in Career Management Field 18 (enlisted), or SQI "3" in Functional Area 18 (officer).
- 3) Reserve Component (RC) SF qualification programs. The SF Tab may be awarded to all personnel who successfully complete an RC SF qualification program according to TRADOC Regulation 135–5, dated 1 June 1988, or its predecessors and who were subsequently awarded, by competent authority, SQI "S" or "3" in MOS 11B, 11C, 12B, 05B, 91B, or ASI "5G" or "3." The SWCS will determine individual entitlement for an award of the SF Tab based on historical review of Army, Continental Army Command (CONARC), and TRADOC regulations prescribing SF qualification requirements in effect at the time the individual began an RC SF qualification program.
- 4) Unit-administered SF qualification programs. The SF Tab may be awarded to all personnel who successfully completed unit-administered SF qualification programs as authorized by regulation. The SWCS will determine individual entitlement to an award of the SF Tab based upon a historical review of regulations prescribing SF qualification requirements in effect at the time the individual began a unit-administered SF qualification program.
- 5) Former wartime service. The Special Forces Tab may be awarded retroactively to all personnel who performed the following wartime service:
  - 5.1) 1942 through 1973. Served with a Special Forces unit during wartime and were either unable to or not required to attend a formal program of instruction but were awarded SQI "S", "3", "5G" by the competent authority.
  - 5.2) Prior to 1954. Service for at least 120 consecutive days in one of the following organizations:
    - 5.2.1) 1st Special Service Force, August 1942 to December 1944.
    - 5.2.2) OSS Detachment 101, April 1942 to September 1945.
    - 5.2.3) OSS Jedburgh Detachments, May 1944 to May 1945.
    - 5.2.4) OSS Operational Groups, May 1944 to May 1945.
    - 5.2.5) OSS Maritime Unit, April 1942 to September 1945.
    - 5.2.6) 6th Army Special Reconnaissance Unit (Alamo Scouts), February 1944 to September 1945.
    - 5.2.7) 8240th Army Unit, June 1950 to July 1953.
    - 5.2.8) 1954 through 1975. Any company-grade officer or enlisted member awarded the CIB or CMB while serving for at least 120 consecutive days in one of the following type organizations:
      - 5.2.8a) SF Operational Detachment-A (A-Team).
      - 5.2.8b) Mobile Strike Force.
      - 5.2.8c) SF Reconnaissance Team.
      - 5.2.8d) SF Special Project Unit.

== Other tabs ==
The Special Forces Tab is one of four permanent individual skill/marksmanship tabs (as compared to a badge) authorized for wear by the U.S. Army. The other authorized skill tabs are the Ranger Tab, Sapper Tab and Jungle Tab, while the President's Hundred Tab is awarded for marksmanship at the National Matches held at Camp Perry, Ohio. Only three may be worn at one time. The President's Hundred Tab is worn above the unit of assignment and below any earned skill tabs. There is no order of precedence among skill tabs.

== See also ==
- Tabs of the United States Army
- Military badges of the United States
