= Ranger tab =

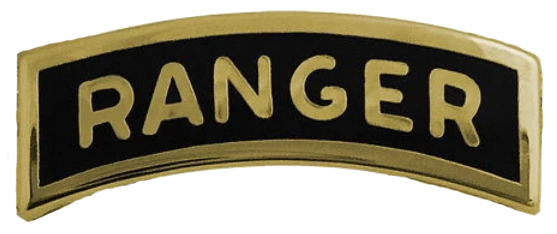
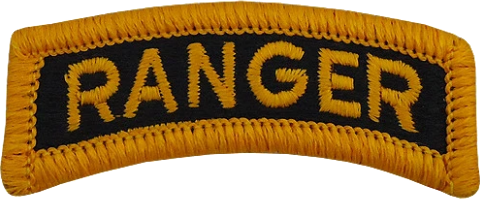
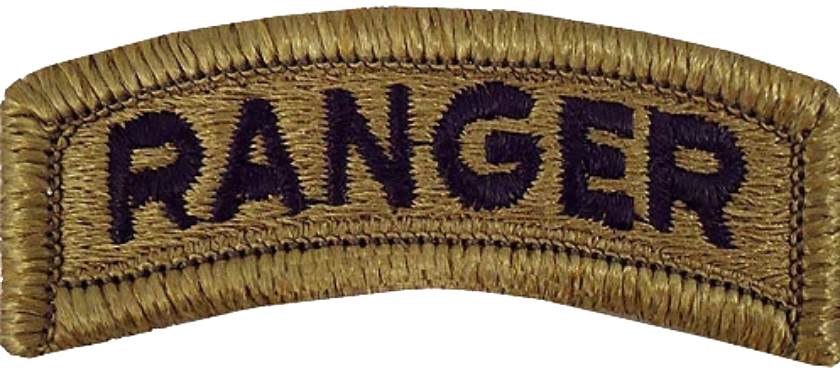
- 1st: Miniature metallic badge variant 2nd: Army Service Uniform variant 3rd: Army Combat Uniform variant
- Type: Tab
- Awarded for: Graduation from Ranger school
- Presented by: United States Army
- Status: Currently awarded
- Established: 1950

Precedence
- Next (higher): Basic Marksmanship Qualification badges
- Next (lower): Special Forces tab

Earning the Ranger tab (1:57)
Official U.S. Army video about the Ranger tab

The Ranger tab is a service school qualification tab of the United States Army, awarded to any soldier who completes Ranger School at the U.S. Army Fort Benning, Georgia. Soldiers who are awarded the Ranger tab are authorized to wear it for the remainder of their military careers. The Ranger tab is considered the pre-eminent award for soldiers in combat arms branches within the United States Army.

In the Infantry Branch, it is an unwritten rule that a Ranger tab is required to achieve full career success; it is worn by most commissioned and non-commissioned officers serving in battalion and above leadership roles in brigade combat teams and infantry divisions.

== Description and history ==
The Ranger tab was created in 1950 and is an embroidered quadrant patch worn on the upper left sleeve of a military uniform. The cloth tab is 2 3/8 inches (6.0 cm) long, 11/16 inch (1.7 cm) wide, with a 1/8 inch (0.3 cm) yellow border and the word "RANGER" inscribed in yellow letters 5/16 inch (0.8 cm) high. A metal Ranger badge is authorized for wear on mess/dress and class-B uniforms. The metal badge is black enameled background and gold letters and border.

The original design of the tab had a black and red color scheme, spelling the word RANGERS. This design was an adaption of the traditional Ranger scroll, intended to recognize those who completed training for the Ranger companies that previously existed.

At the time of its creation, the Ranger tab was retroactively awarded to any Army soldiers who previously completed a Ranger course conducted by the now-defunct Ranger Training Command. In addition, as set forth in Army regulations, veterans of certain categories of former wartime service are also eligible for retroactive awards of the tab. Among these are:

- Any person who completed a Ranger course conducted by the Ranger Training Command at Fort Benning, Georgia
- Any person who was awarded the CIB while serving during World War II as a member of a Ranger BN (1st through 6th inclusive) or in the 5307th Composite Unit (Provisional) and 475th Infantry Regiment (Merrill's Marauders)

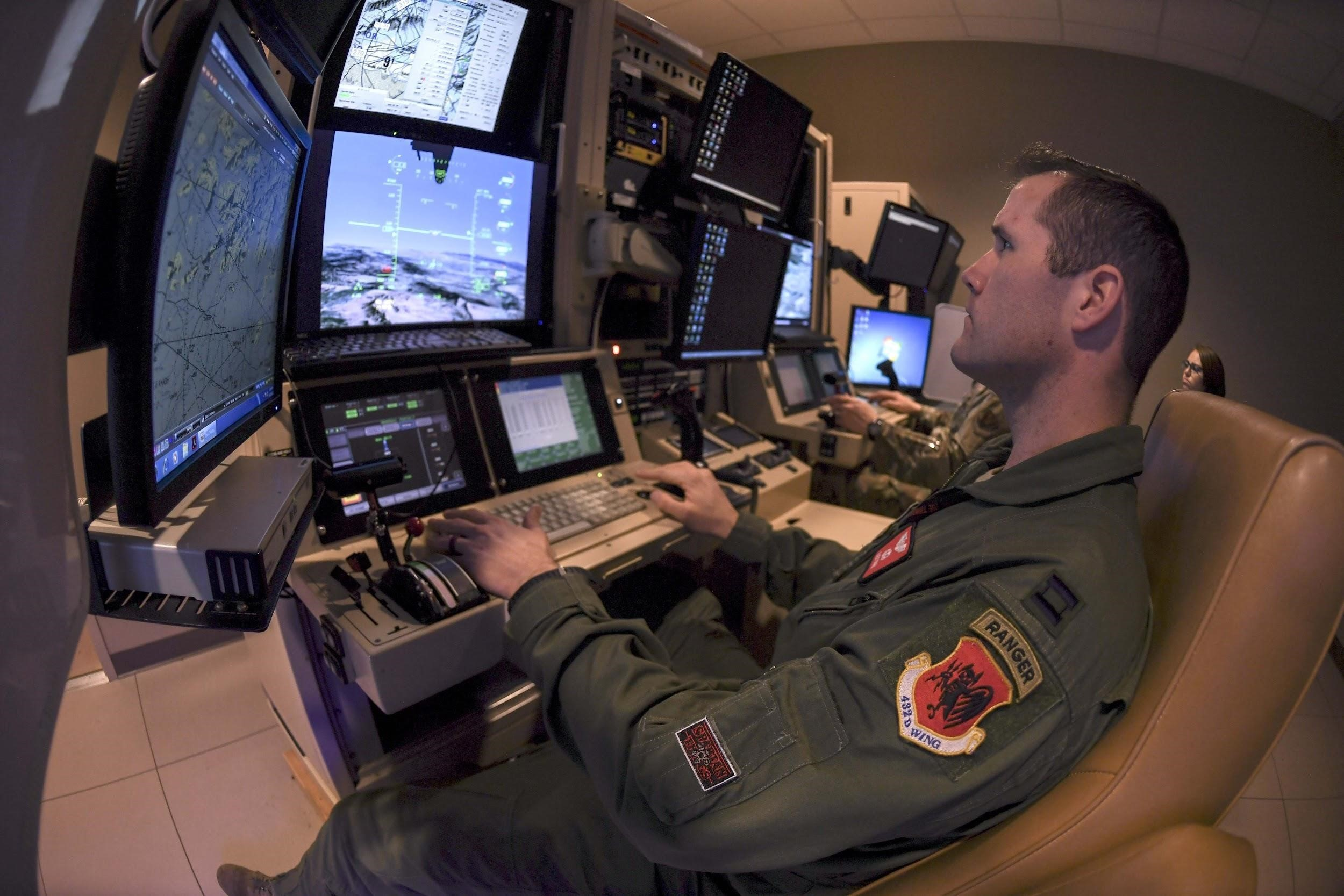
867th Attack Squadron MQ-9 Reaper pilot wearing a Ranger tab

The Ranger Course was conceived during the Korean War and was known as the Ranger Training Command. On 10 October 1951, the Ranger Training Command was inactivated and became the Ranger Department, a branch of the Infantry School at Fort Benning, Georgia. From 1954 to the early 1970's, the Army's goal was to have one Ranger-tabbed NCO per infantry platoon and one officer per company. In an effort to better achieve this goal, in 1954 the Army required all combat arms officers to become Ranger qualified.

Today, the Ranger tab is considered mandatory for all soldiers serving in leadership positions in the 75th Ranger Regiment. Outside the Regiment, it is considered a highly desired award for career progression. The infantry branch aims to provide all infantry lieutenants with the opportunity to earn the Ranger tab after Infantry BOLC. Earning the tab is considered an indication that an officer possesses the skills and stamina to effectively lead soldiers in the infantry. All other branches also encourage their lieutenants to attempt to earn the Ranger tab. It is encouraged that those who will serve within an Infantry Brigade Combat Team or will serve as a Special Forces Officer have their Ranger tab.

The Ranger tab is one of a number of foreign badges authorized to be worn on Canadian Armed Forces uniform.

== Award eligibility ==
Award eligibility as follows:

- Successful completion of a Ranger course conducted by the U.S. Army Infantry School
- Any person who successfully completed a Ranger course conducted by the Ranger Training Command at Fort Benning, Georgia
- Any person who was awarded the CIB while serving during World War II as a member of a Ranger BN (1st through 6th inclusive) or in the 5307th Composite Unit (Provisional) and 475th Infantry Regiment (Merrill's Marauders)

== Other tabs ==
The Ranger tab is one of five permanent individual skill/marksmanship tabs (as compared to a badge) authorized for wear by the U.S. Army. In order of precedence on the uniform, they are the President's Hundred tab, the Special Forces tab, the Ranger tab, the Sapper tab, and the Jungle tab. Only three may be worn at one time.

== See also ==
- Tabs of the United States Army
- Military badges of the United States
