= IR flag =

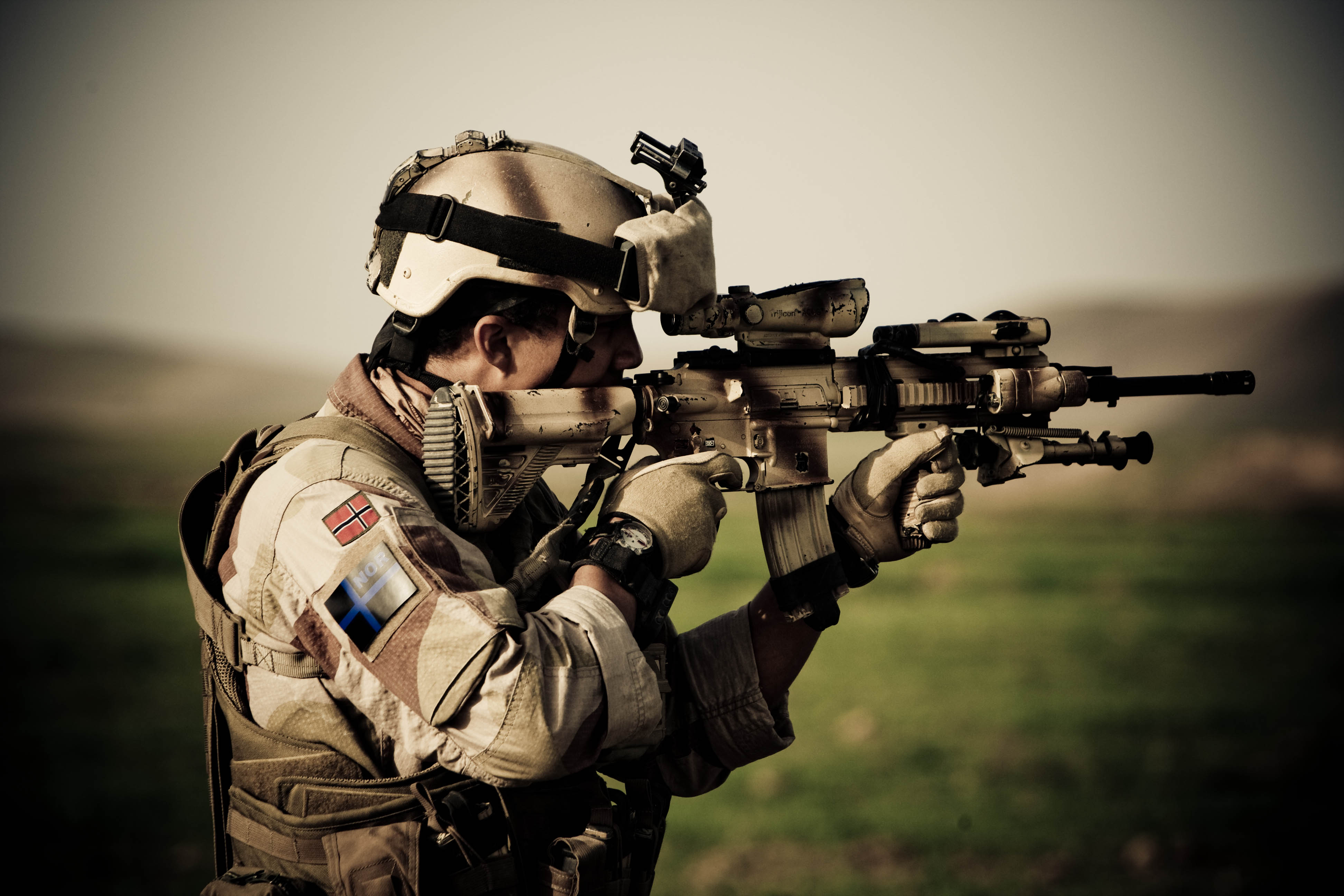
Norwegian soldier armed with HK416N in Afghanistan wearing an infrared flag on his right arm (note the subdued colour).

An infrared flag (or IR flag) is a type of combat identification used by soldiers. They consist of a national flag or other identifying icon with a Velcro backing for application to a soldier's uniform on the upper arm or chest.

== Function ==
IR flags are rendered in materials that result in a high contrast ratio in the infrared spectrum. They are designed to show up brightly whilst being observed through night vision equipment, as found on modern combat aircraft or attack helicopters. They are designed to protect the soldier from friendly fire.

However, camouflage (if any) is not compromised as the materials produce a low contrast ratio in the visible spectrum, and are thus not easily visible to the naked eye.

== Restrictions ==
In early stages of their production, these patches were easily available for civilians to purchase, and the Taliban and al-Qaeda bought them or stole them from fallen International Security Assistance Force (ISAF) soldiers since the coalition attack aircraft were not authorized to fire upon anyone wearing the patch.

Since this came to light, the US State Department has restricted all export of these patches. Because they are popular with Airsofters, some replica versions have been produced which are not infrared reflective.
