= Army Elements Fleece =

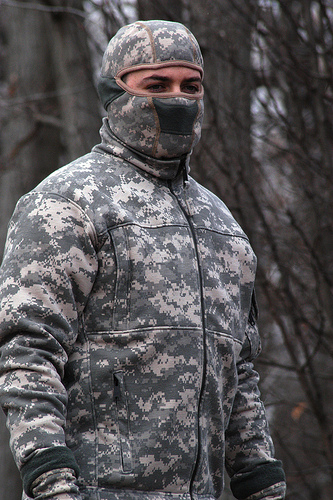
Army Elements Fleece (AEF) in Universal Camouflage Pattern

The Army Elements Fleece (AEF) is a versatile, insulating layer that allows US Army aviation crews to adapt to varying mission requirements and environmental conditions.

The primary fabric has an integrated Nomex fleece inner surface to insulate the soldier against cold temperatures. The fabric is waterproof and windproof, but also breathable, to protect the soldier in inclement weather including wind, rain, sleet, and snow. The outer layer is printed in the Universal Camouflage Pattern. The inner Nomex fleece layer is foliage green.
