= Tabs of the United States Army =

American Army insignia

Earning the Tab (1:21)
Official Army video introducing and describing tabs in the U.S. Army

In the United States Army, tabs are cloth and/or metal arches that are worn on U.S. Army uniforms, displaying a word or words signifying a special skill. On the Army Combat Uniform and Army Service Uniform, the tabs are worn above a unit's shoulder sleeve insignia (SSI) and are used to identify a unit's or a soldier's special skill(s) or are worn as part of a unit's SSI as part of its unique heritage. Individual tabs are also worn as small metal arches above or below medals or ribbons on dress uniforms.

Tabs are highly coveted in the U.S. Army. Unlike medals – which are only worn on a soldier's garrison or dress uniform – tabs are worn on a soldier's combat uniform. Moreover, tabs are worn above a soldier's SSI which rarely include words as a part of their symbolism. It is unique in that it identifies an individual soldier's or a whole unit's special skill using words rather than images to symbolize a skill. For example, while any member of a special forces unit will wear the unit's SSI that includes an arrowhead, sword, lightning, and Airborne tab, only soldiers who have completed special forces training will have been awarded and wear an additional tab containing the words "SPECIAL FORCES" (i.e., the Special Forces tab) that is worn above the unit's Airborne tab.

Some tabs are awarded to recognize an individual soldier's combat-related skills or marksmanship and are worn by a soldier permanently. These tabs are also considered special skill badges and have metal equivalents that are worn on the soldier's chest of their Army dress uniforms. Other tabs recognize a whole unit's special skill and are considered to be part of a specific unit's SSI and are worn by a soldier only while they belong to that unit. The Jungle and Arctic tabs are unique in that while they are awarded to recognize an individual soldier's skill, they are only worn by soldiers while they belong to certain units. Similarly, tabs awarded at the state level by the Army National Guard can only be worn by soldiers while they are on state-level orders.

== Individual tabs ==
There are currently four permanent individual skill/marksmanship tabs authorized for wear by the U.S. Army. Only three skill tabs may be worn at one time. A soldier wearing three tabs is said to have achieved the "tower of power" in military slang. Prior to the creation of the Sapper tab, this required a soldier to earn both a Special Forces tab and Ranger tab as well as serve in a unit with an Airborne tab or Mountain tab as part of its SSI.

=== Special Forces ===
Special Forces tab

The Special Forces tab is a service school qualification tab of the U.S. Army, awarded to any soldier completing either the Special Forces Qualification Course or the Special Forces Detachment Officer Qualification Course. Soldiers who are awarded the Special Forces tab are authorized to wear it for the remainder of their military careers, even when not serving in a Special Forces command. The Special Forces tab can be revoked by the Chain of Command for significant violations of conduct considered contrary to the high standards expected of a Special Forces soldier (for example, DUI conviction or other forms of misconduct).

The Special Forces tab was created in 1983 and is an embroidered arch patch worn on the upper left sleeve of a military uniform. The cloth tab is 3 7/4 inches (12 cm) wide and is teal blue with yellow embroidered letters.

=== Ranger ===
Ranger tab

The Ranger tab is a qualification tab authorized upon completion of the U.S. Army's Ranger School by a member of the U.S. military, civilian personnel, or non-U.S. military personnel. The Ranger tab was approved by the Chief of Staff, Army, on 30 October 1950.

The full color tab is worn 1/2 inch (1.3 cm) below the shoulder seam on the left sleeve of the Army green coat. The subdued tab is worn 1/2 inch (1.3 cm) below the shoulder seam on the left sleeve of utility uniforms, field jackets and the Desert Battle Dress Uniform (DBDU). The full color tab is 2 3/8 inches (6.0 cm) long, 11/16 inch (1.7 cm) wide, with a 1/8 inch (0.32 cm) yellow border and the word "RANGER" inscribed in yellow letters 5/16 inch (0.79 cm) high. The subdued tab is identical, except the background is olive drab and the word "RANGER" is in black letters.

=== Sapper ===
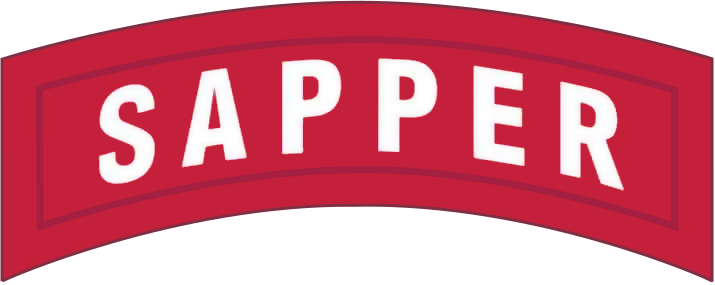
Sapper tab

The Sapper tab is a qualification tab that is authorized for graduates of the U.S. Army's Sapper Leader Course. The Sapper tab was approved by the Chief of Staff, Army, on 28 June 2004. The Sapper tab can be revoked by the Engineer Commanding Officer of Ft. Leonard Wood, MO for misconduct, or not upholding the standard as an Engineer. Any requests will be processed through USASC.

The full color tab is worn 1/2 inch (1.3 cm) below the shoulder seam on the left sleeve of the Army green coat. The subdued tab is worn 1/2 inch (1.3 cm) below the shoulder seam on the left sleeve of utility uniforms, field jackets and the desert battle dress uniform (DBDU). The full color tab is 2 3/8 inches (6.0 cm) long, 11/16 inch (1.7 cm) wide, with a 1/8 inch (0.32 cm) red border and the word "SAPPER" inscribed in white letters 5/16 inch (0.79 cm) high. The woodland subdued tab is identical, except the background is olive drab and the word "SAPPER" is in black letters and the desert subdued tab has a khaki background with the word "SAPPER" in spice brown letters.

=== President's Hundred ===
President's Hundred tab

The President's Hundred tab is a marksmanship tab that is authorized for soldiers who qualify among the top-scoring 100 competitors in the President's Match held annually at the National Rifle Matches at Camp Perry, Ohio. This is a permanent award which will stay with the individual; there is no annual requirement to maintain the President's Hundred tab.

On 27 May 1958, the National Rifle Association of America requested the Deputy Chief of Staff for Personnel's approval of a tab for presentation to each member of the "President's Hundred." The NRA's plan was to award the cloth tab together with a metal tab during the 1958 National Matches. The cloth tab was approved for wear on the US Army uniform on 3 March 1958.

A full-color embroidered tab of yellow 4 1/4 inches (11 cm) long and 5/8 inch (1.6 cm) high, with the word "President's Hundred" centered in 1/4 inch (0.64 cm) high green letters. The metal replica is 2 inches (5.1 cm) wide.

=== Jungle ===
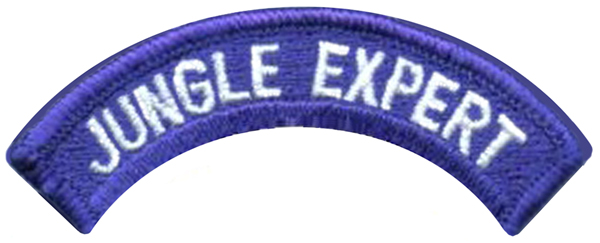
Former Jungle Expert Tab (U.S. Army Pacific)

Current Jungle Tab

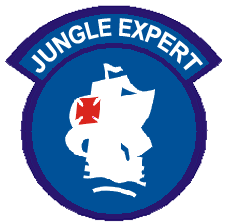
Former Jungle Expert Badge (U.S. Army South)

The Jungle Expert badge was often worn by graduates of the Jungle Operations Training Center (JOTC) at Fort Sherman until the school became inactive in 1999. The badge was authorized for wear by soldiers assigned to U.S. Army South who graduate from JOTC, but the badge was never recognized Army-wide.

In 2013, JOTC was reopened in Hawaii and the Jungle Expert badge was revitalized as a tab, which is authorized for wear by soldiers who complete the course and are assigned to the U.S. Army Pacific area of responsibility and units who fall under their operational control. Today, the revitalized tab simply reads "Jungle" and is awarded to graduates of the JOTC course conducted by the 25th Infantry Division in Hawaii and the Army Security Cooperation Group–South in Panama.

On 1 August 2026, the Army changed the status of the Jungle Tab to an official skill tab—similar to the Ranger, Sapper and Special Forces—tabs according to a spokesman from the U.S. Army Office of Public Affairs.

=== Governor's "#" (National Guard) ===
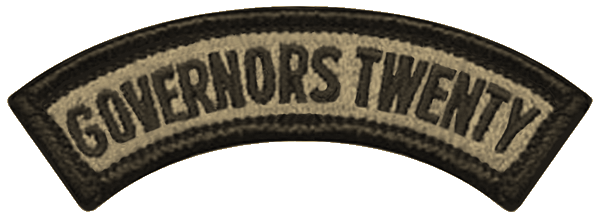
Governor's Twenty tab

The Governor's Twenty tab is a state-level National Guard award, created in 1968, that is awarded to the top 20 shooters in a state. However, award criteria vary from state to state. For example, within the Texas Military Forces, only eight guardsmen are presented this award for rifle, eight for pistol, two for sniper, and two for machine gun each year. Texas guardsmen compete against other Texas guardsmen who have already received the award; thus, there may be one or two new recipients of this award each year. As of July 2014, 14 states have authorized the awarding of the Governor's Twenty tab.

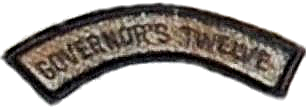
Governor's Twelve/Dozen tab

In the Missouri National Guard and Arizona National Guard, the top twelve guardsmen selected to represent their state at the Winston P. Wilson Rifle and Pistol Championships are awarded the Governor's Twelve tab (for Missouri) or Governor's Dozen tab (for Arizona). These tabs are worn on the upper-left sleeve of the ACU below individual tabs and above unit and honor guard tabs. The Missouri National Guard also awards a Governor's Twelve Ribbon that accompanies the tab which is worn on dress uniforms; any guardsman who earns the award more than once wears Hawthorn Cluster Devices on top of the ribbon.

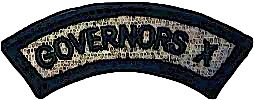
Governor's Ten tab

In the Iowa National Guard, the top ten rifle and/or pistol shooters from the state's Army and Air Force guard units that compete at the Iowa Governor's 10 Shooting Competition are awarded the Governor's Ten ("X") tab. Prior to 2008, the Governor's Ten tab was awarded to the top five pistol shooters and top five rifle shooters. Today, the rifle and pistol scores are combined so only the best 10 overall shooters earn the tab.

Because these awards are state-level awards, soldiers and airmen under Title 32 status (state control) are authorized to wear them; soldiers and airmen under Title 10 status (federal control) are not.

=== Ranger Challenge (Army ROTC) ===
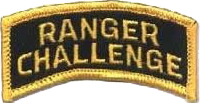
Ranger Challenge tab

The Ranger Challenge tab is the only United States Department of the Army individual qualification tab awarded exclusively to Army Reserve Officers' Training Corps (ROTC) cadets. This award is presented annually to cadets who compete in regional ROTC Ranger Challenge competitions.

== Unit tabs ==
An SSI is an embroidered patch worn on uniforms of the United States Army that identifies the wearer's major formation. Unit tabs are an integral part of the SSI and are never worn separately. Soldiers are only authorized to wear the tab while assigned to the organization that prescribes wearing the SSI with the tab.

=== Airborne ===
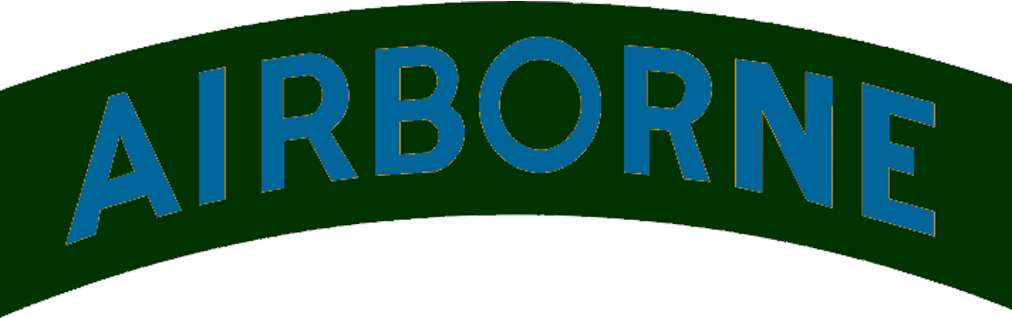
Airborne tabs [current (1st row) and historical (2nd row)]

The Airborne tab is a part of the SSI of certain airborne and air assault units. Airborne and air assault forces are military units, usually light infantry, set up to be moved by aircraft and dropped into battle. Thus, they can be placed behind enemy lines and have an ability to deploy almost anywhere with little warning. The tab is worn immediately above and touching the SSI of the airborne or air assault unit. The tabs are 2 1/2 inches (6.4 cm) long and 11/16 inch (1.7 cm) wide. The letters are 5/16 inch (0.79 cm) high.

=== Mountain ===
Mountain tab

The Mountain tab is part of the SSI of the 10th Mountain Division and the 86th Infantry Brigade Combat Team (Mountain) and worn informally by cadre of the Northern Warfare Training Center and the Army Mountain Warfare School. These units specialize in conducting or teaching warfare within the alpine operational environment. The Mountain tab was first introduced when the 10th Light Division was redesignated the 10th Mountain Division in 1944.

Although they do not wear the Mountain tab, mountain warfare training is a basic component of the US Army's Ranger School and each US Army Special Forces Group maintains detachments that specialize in mountain warfare.

=== Arctic ===
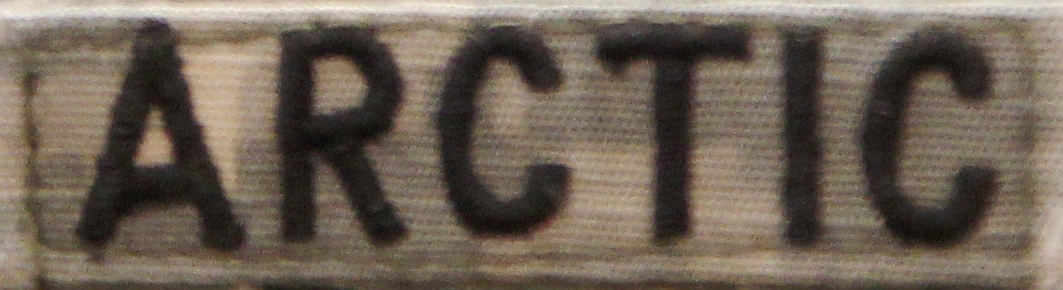
Original Arctic tab, worn below the SSI on the ACU, authorized by U.S. Army Pacific

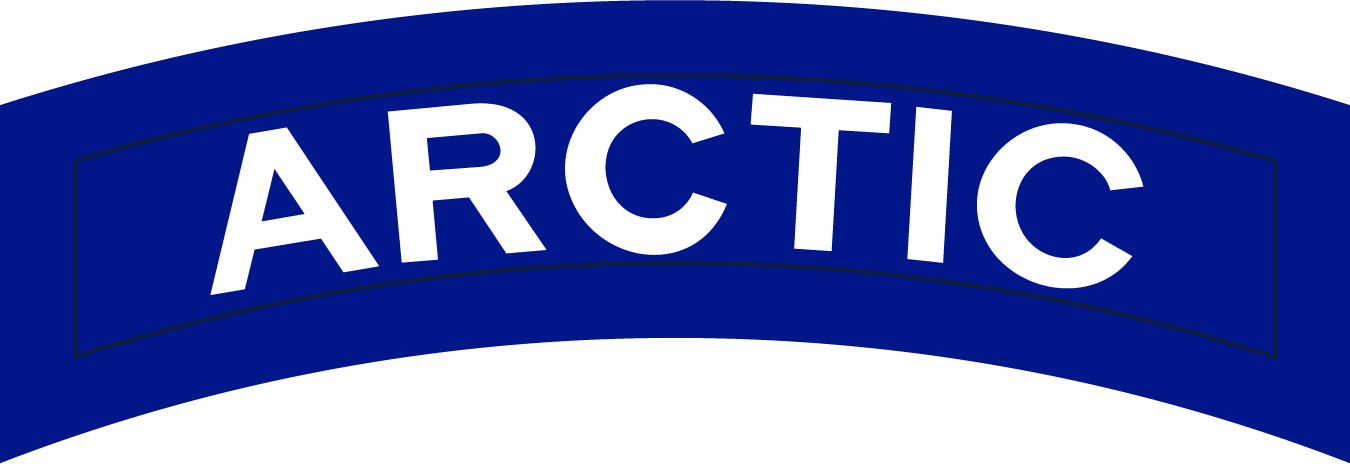
Arctic tab, authorized for wear by U.S. Army units assigned to the Arctic

The Arctic tab was an individual skill tab earned by those who graduated from the Cold Weather Orientation Course or Cold Weather Leadership Course held at the Northern Warfare Training Center. The tab was authorized for wear on the Army Combat Uniform (ACU) and Army Service Uniform (ASU) by U.S. Army Pacific while assigned to any of its units while in its area of responsibility. The Arctic tab was originally designed as a rectangular bar worn below the SSI on the ACU. In November 2019, the Arctic tab was redesigned to resemble other U.S. Army skill tabs and worn above the SSI, below other skill tabs and above unit designation tabs.

On 25 April 2022, the G-1 of the U.S. Army authorized the wear of the Arctic tab by soldiers assigned to organizations in Alaska as a temporary wear tab with specific SSIs, above any already designed unit tabs and below individual tabs. In the authorization letter, Lieutenant General Gary Brito wrote, "The Arctic tab recognizes organizations in the Arctic region, which operate in extreme cold-weather, mountainous, and high-latitude environments and support the Arctic strategy."

=== Honor Guard ===
Honor Guard tab of the 3rd Infantry Regiment

Honor Guard tab for select units

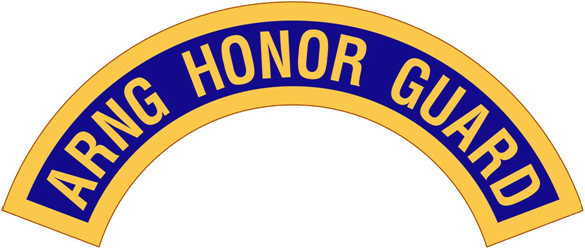
Army National Guard Honor Guard tab for select units

Honor Guard tabs

The Honor Guard tab is a part of the SSI of the 3rd U.S. Infantry Regiment (The Old Guard) and other selected units with ceremonial duties. The tab had been worn by the Honor Guard Company of the 1st Battle Group, 3d Infantry (The Old Guard) since early 1950. It was officially approved for wear by the Deputy Chief of Staff for Personnel (DCSPER) on 14 October 1959. The 3rd Infantry's tab is ultramarine blue 3 7/8 inches (9.8 cm) long and 11/16 inch (1.7 cm) high, with the designation "HONOR GUARD" in white letters 5/16 inch (0.79 cm) high. The subdued tab is identical, except the background is olive drab and the letters are black.

On 16 March 1965, the DCSPER approved a white tab with ultramarine blue lettering for wear by select Honor Guard units throughout the U.S. Army. Proposed designs were submitted on 26 March 1965 and the color-reversed version of The Old Guard's tab was approved on 19 April 1965. A subdued tab is also authorized. Additionally, there are other select Army and Army National Guard units that have their own distinctive Honor Guard tabs that are not defined in general Army uniform regulations, such as the United Nations Command Honor Guard that wear a red (or scarlet) tab with white letters on the left shoulder of their service dress uniform.

On 31 December 2012, the DCSPER approved another Honor Guard tab for wear by select Army National Guard units. The new tab is an ultramarine blue embroidered tab with the inscription "ARNG HONOR GUARD" in gold 5/16 inch (0.79 cm) letters, edged with a 1/8 inch (0.32 cm) gold border.

=== Band ===
US Army Field Band tab of the US Army Military District of Washington

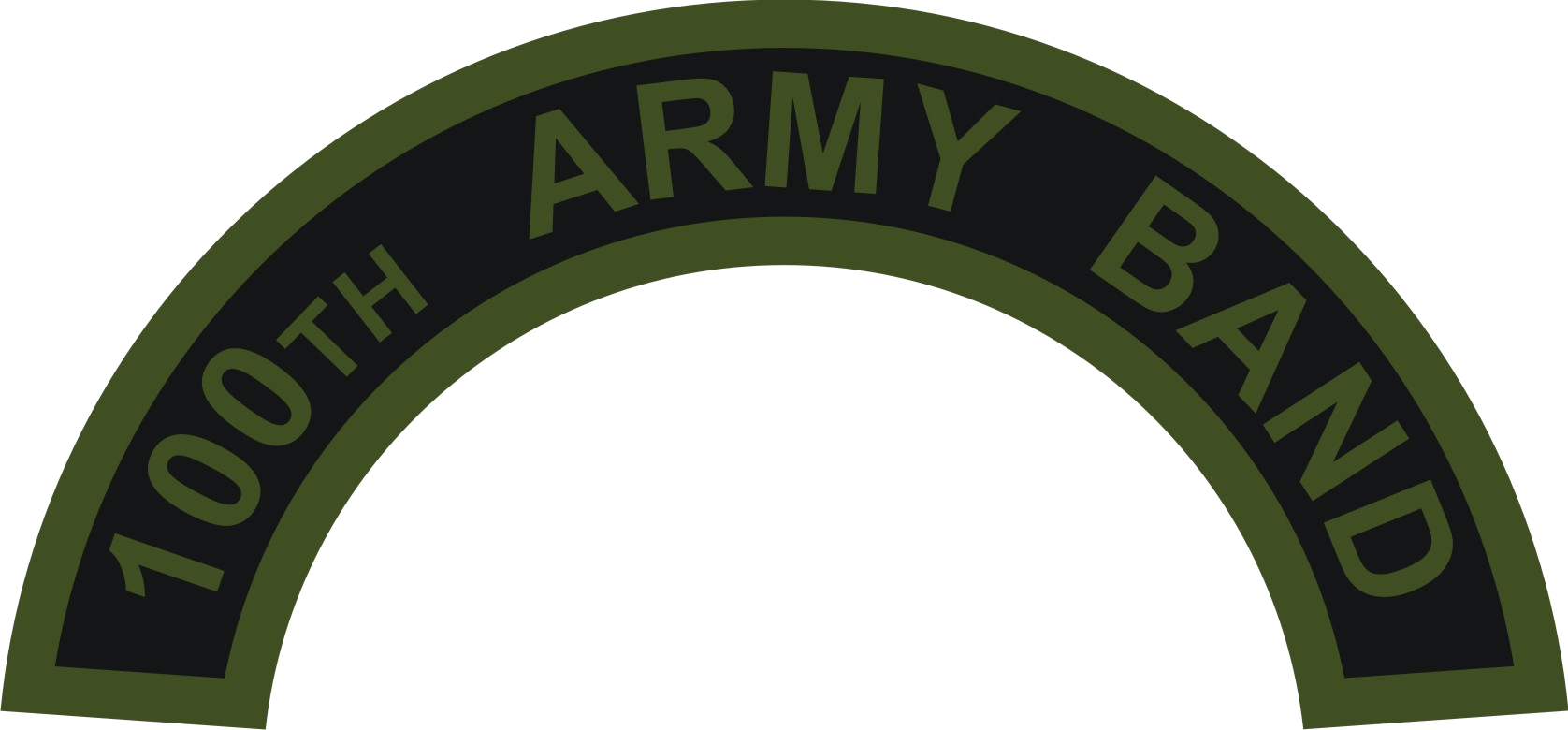
100th Army Band tab of the US Army Reserve's 81st Regional Support Command

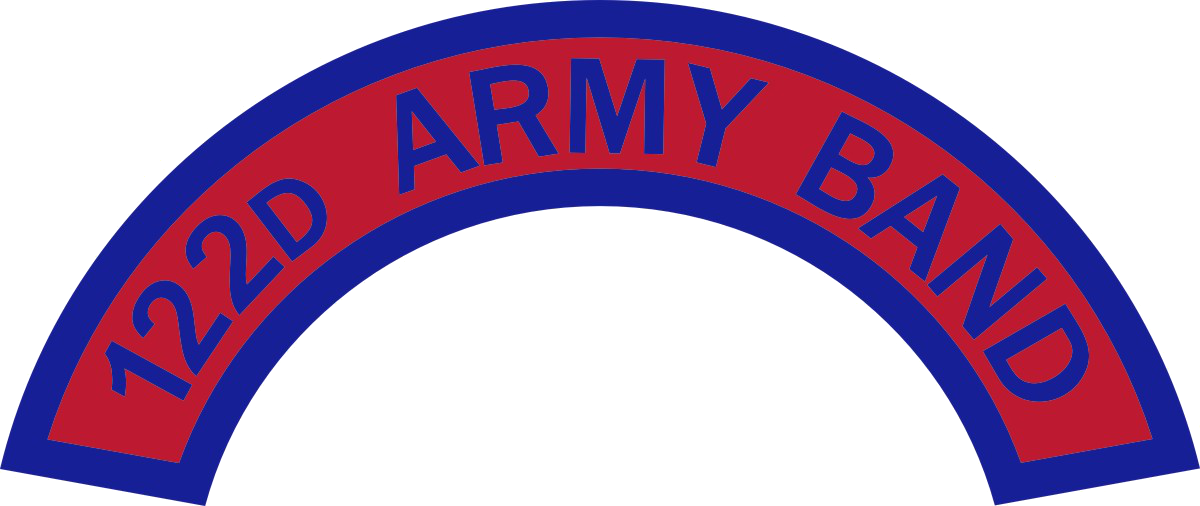
122nd Army Band tab of the Ohio Army National Guard's 371st Sustainment Brigade

Examples of some select units' band tabs

Similar to the Honor Guard tab for select units, the Band tab is worn by an Army band within a given unit. The exception to this is the U.S. Army Field Band tab which is an integral part of that unit's SSI, just like the Mountain tab worn by the 10th Mountain Division. Each Army unit that has a band can have its own unique Band tab, designed by the Institute of Heraldry, and can only be worn with that unit's SSI. Once a band member leaves the band to join another element of the same unit, they can no longer wear the Band tab but will continue to wear their unit's SSI. Subdued versions of each unit's Band tab are authorized for wear with their unit's subdued SSI.

=== Advisor ===
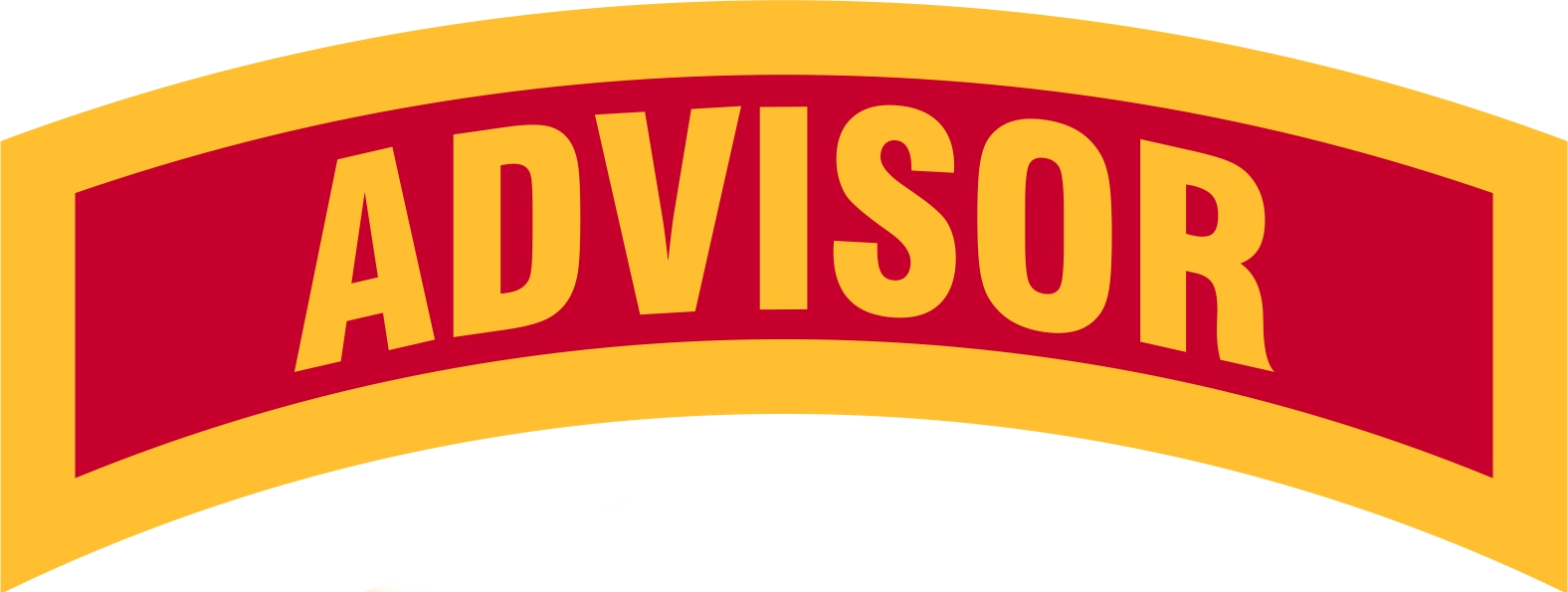
SFAB tab

Members of the Security Force Assistance Brigades wear a tab as part of their unit's SSI. Early versions of the SSI incorporated a tab embroidered with the words "ADVISE – ASSIST." Shortly after, the SSI tab was changed to read "COMBAT ADVISOR". The brigades' official SSI was authorized in December 2017 and the tab was again changed to "ADVISOR" and is authorized for wear by all security force assistance units.

=== SETAF-AF ===
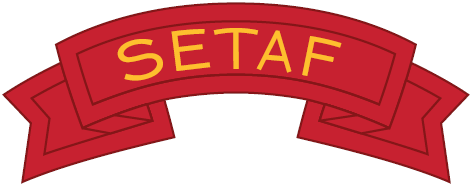
Southern European TAsk Force, AFrica (SETAF–AF) scroll

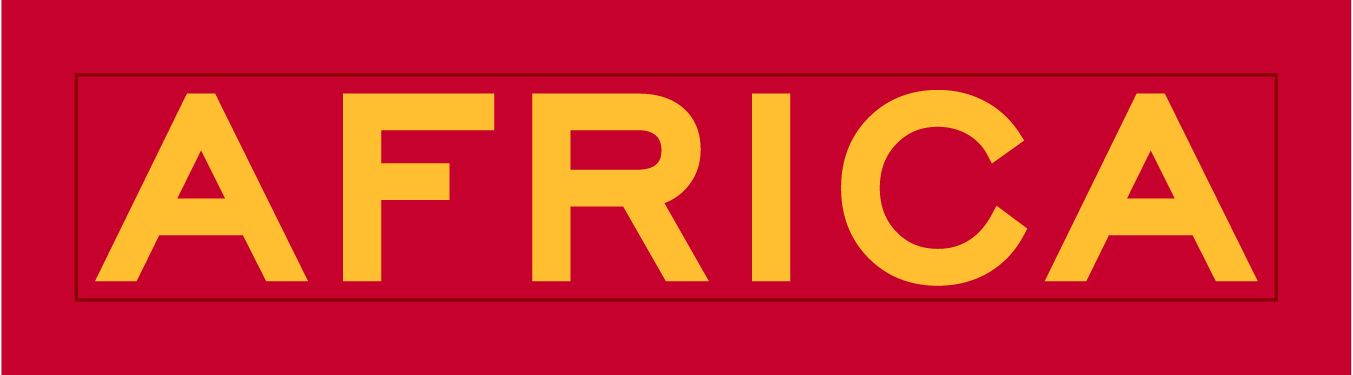
SETAF-AF SSI's bar–style bottom tab

The Southern European Task Force, Africa (SETAF–AF) SSI incorporates a scroll at the top and a bar–style tab at the bottom of the unit's SSI. The maroon colored scroll incorporates the letters "SETAF" representing the name of the unit and was originally approved by the U.S. Army's Institute of Heraldry in 1955. The SETAF-AF SSI's top tab was changed to the airborne tab in 2001 but was reverted to the SETAF scroll in 2008. As a result of the re-designation of the U.S. Army Africa/Southern European Task Force to the Southern European Task Force, Africa in 2021, the heraldry of the SETAF SSI was updated to reflect this change. In November 2024, a red bar–style tab was added to the bottom of the SSI with the word "AFRICA" embroidered in gold, matching the colors of the SSI's scroll.

=== Combined Division ===
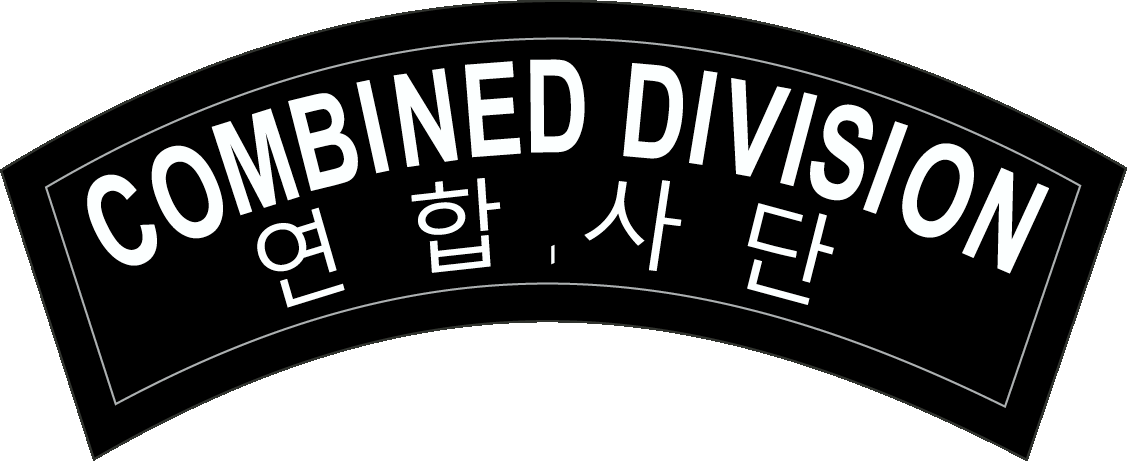
2nd ID's combined HQ tab

On 29 December 2015, the U.S. Army approved the wear of a black tab by soldiers assigned to Headquarters, 2nd Infantry Division (ID). This black tab, worn immediately above the 2nd ID's SSI, is embroidered with white English and Korean letters spelling out the words "Combined Division"—the Korean words 연합사단 are pronounced [Yeon-hap-sa-dan] in English. The tab is used to signify the joint nature of the new combined headquarters made up of units from the U.S. Army's 2nd ID and the Republic of Korea Army's (ROKA) 8th ID, established on 3 June 2015. The tab may be worn only by U.S. Army 2nd ID and ROKA 8th ID headquarters soldiers while serving within the geographical boundaries and territorial waters of the Republic of Korea.

=== OPFOR ===
OPFOR Tab worn by 1-4 Infantry on their black Army uniform below their SSI

The U.S. Army's 7th Army Training Command's 1st Battalion, 4th Infantry Regiment is the Opposing Force (OPFOR) at the Joint Multinational Readiness Center in Hohenfels, Bavaria, Germany To help distinguish 1-4 Infantry's OPFOR soldiers from those training, these soldiers wear a unique all-black U.S. Army style uniform with the 7th Army Training Command SSI and a red fabric rectangular tab below it bordered with yellow stitching with the letters "OPFOR" centered on the tab in yellow stitching.

== Obsolete tabs ==
=== Pershing ===
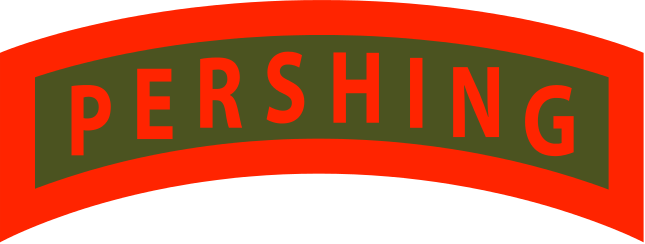
Pershing tab

The Pershing tab was worn as part of the SSI for units supporting the Pershing missile system. From 1970 to 1971 the 56th Artillery Brigade wore the SSI of the Seventh Army with the Pershing tab. In 1971 the 56th FA received their own SSI that included the Pershing tab, which continued through redesignation as the 56th Field Artillery Command in 1986. The 3rd Battalion, 9th Field Artillery Regiment wore the Pershing tab with the SSI of III Corps from 1971 to 1981, then with that of the 214th Field Artillery Brigade when it had an SSI created in 1981. The Pershing tab was discontinued with the deactivation of units following the elimination of the Pershing missile system in 1991.

=== Company–Level Ranger Scrolls ===
Example: Company F, 425th Infantry Ranger scroll (2nd version)

Prior to the consolidation of the 75th Ranger Regiment into its own unit, the U.S. Army had ranger companies assigned to various infantry divisions and above. These ranger companies wore black berets with either unique organizational beret flashes or the 75th Ranger Regiment's Beret Flash and Distinctive Unit Insignia. Also, these companies wore a unique black scroll with red piping and white alpha/numeric characters, known as a "ranger scroll." These "ranger scrolls" look similar to today's SSIs worn by the 75th Ranger Regiment and its battalions but incorporated the words "RANGER" and "AIRBORNE" stacked in the center flanked by their company designation on the left and their infantry unit designation on the right. In 1985, these ranger companies were redesignated as long-range surveillance companies and in doing so were no longer ranger units but specialized airborne–qualified intelligence units, thus swapping their ranger scroll and black beret for an airborne tab and maroon beret.

=== Infantry Scout Dog Scrolls ===
During the Cold War, U.S. Army units that were focused on employing dogs to support various infantry activities, such as patrolling, explosive detection, and more, wore a scroll above their SSI identifying their unit, usually at the platoon level, as an infantry scout dog unit. Although these scout dog scrolls were similar in layout to ranger scrolls, each unit's scroll was different in their design.

=== Air Assault ===
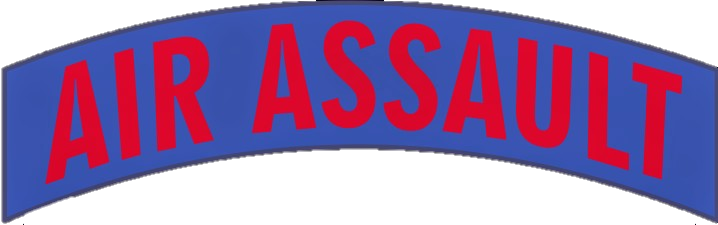
SSI tab of the former 11th Air Assault Division

In 1963, the 11th Air Assault Division (Test) was established—formed from reactivated elements of the 11th Airborne Division—to explore the theory and practicality of helicopter assault tactics, and was inactivated two years later when testing was completed and the 1st Cavalry Division (Airmobile) was formed. Although this test unit wore the SSI of the 11th Airborne Division, they replaced their Airborne tab with a unique Air Assault tab in February 1963, believed to be the first and last approved Air Assault tab in the U.S. Army.

=== Armor Divisions ===
1st Armor Division's Tab; unit nicknamed "Old Ironsides"

After World War II, U.S. Army armor divisions began wearing rectangular tabs embroidered with their division's nickname at the base of their division's signature three-color triangular SSI. In the 1950s and 60s, these tabs became official uniform items to be worn with specific armor division SSIs. In the 1970s, armor divisions were authorized to incorporate their rectangular tabs into their official division SSIs as a one piece insignia.

=== Command Identification ===
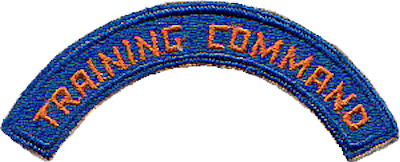
Example: The Army Air Forces' Training Command SSI tab

Given the U.S. Army Air Forces (AAF) SSI did not allow someone to determine which command the wearer belonged, on 28 July 1945 the U.S. Army approved the use of command identification tabs—also known as an arc—to help identify a soldier's command. These command identification tabs were worn above the AAF SSI as an arc that followed the curvature of the SSI and was embroidered with the name of the AAF command in the same blue and gold colors as the SSI. The use of these command identification tabs continued until the introduction of the U.S. Air Force blue uniform in 1949.

== See also ==
- Duty tabs of the United States Air Force
- Badges of the United States Army
