= James A. Abrahamson =

United States Air Force general (born 1933)

James Alan Abrahamson
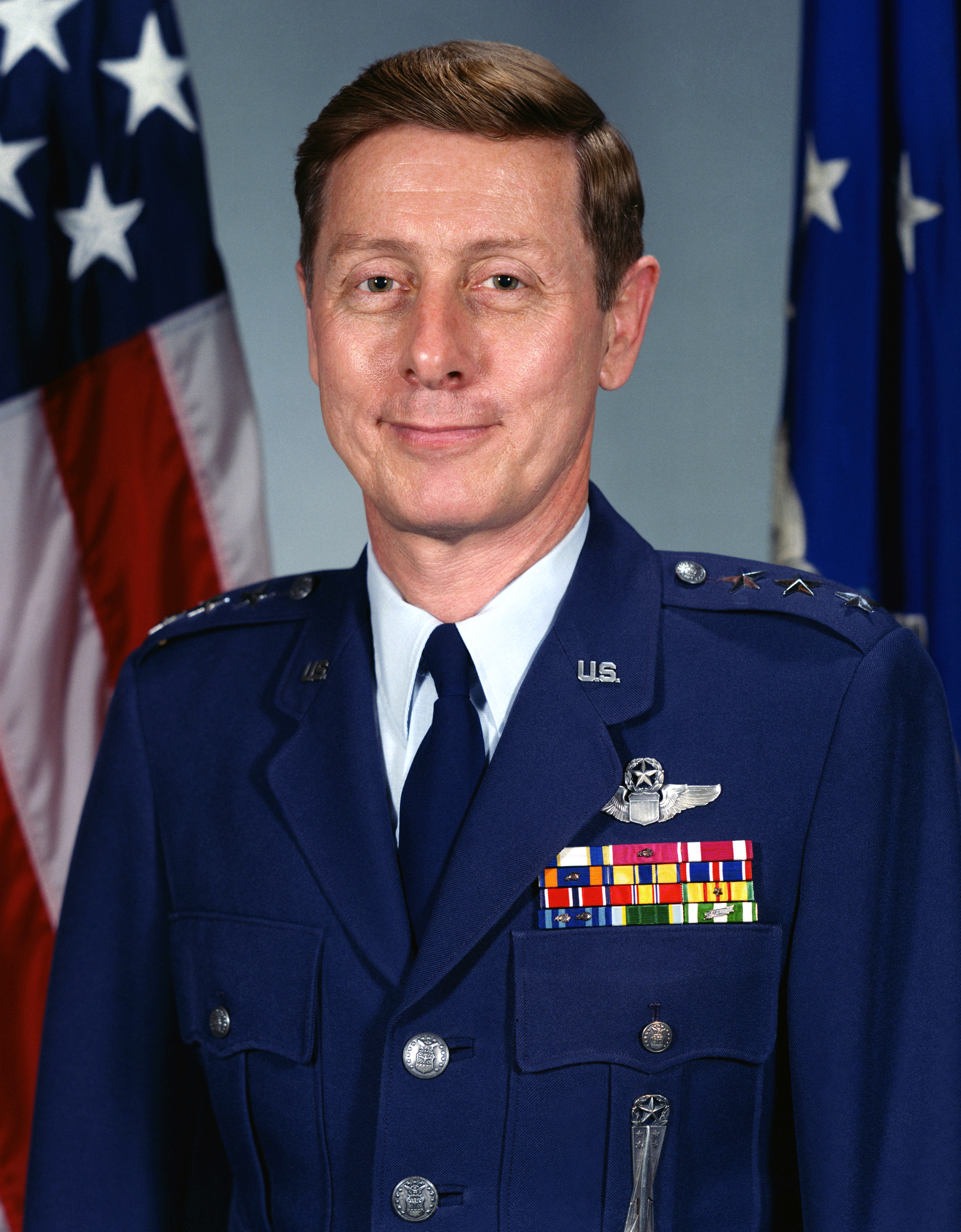
- Lt. Gen. James A. Abrahamson (USAF Ret'd)
- Born: May 19, 1933 (age 93); Williston, North Dakota, U.S.
- Education: Massachusetts Institute of Technology (BS); University of Oklahoma (MS)
- Military career
- Allegiance: United States of America
- Branch: United States Air Force
- Service years: 1955–1989
- Rank: Lieutenant general
- Nickname: Gen Abe
- Commands: Strategic Defense Initiative; 4950th Test Wing
- Conflicts: Vietnam War
- Awards: Distinguished Service Medal; Legion of Merit (3); Air Medal (2); Meritorious Service Medal; Air Medal; Air Force Commendation Medal; Outstanding Unit Award; Organizational Excellence Award; National Defense Service Medal; Vietnam Service Medal; Air Force Longevity Service Award; Marksmanship Ribbon; Vietnam Campaign Medal; Belgian Order of Leopold; Dutch Order of Orange-Nassau; Norwegian Order of St. Olav; USAF Command Pilot Badge; USAF Space and Missile Badge; Master Missile Maintenance Badge
- Space career

USAF astronaut
- Selection: 1967 USAF MOL Group 3
- Mission: None

James Alan Abrahamson (born May 19, 1933) is a retired U.S. Air Force general who served as a designated astronaut, associate director of NASA and former director of President Ronald Reagan's Strategic Defense Initiative from 1984 until 1989. He is a businessman who served as chairman of the board of GeoEye, a company he helped to transform into the world's largest space imaging corporation and that merged with DigitalGlobe Inc in January 2013. Previously, he served as chairman of Oracle Corporation's board of directors from 1992 until 1995.

== Early life and education ==
Abrahamson was born in Williston, North Dakota, on May 19, 1933. He earned a Bachelor of Science degree in Aeronautical Engineering from the Massachusetts Institute of Technology in 1955 and a Master of Science degree in the same field from the University of Oklahoma in 1961. He completed Squadron Officer School in 1958, Air Command and Staff College in 1966, and the Industrial College of the Armed Forces in 1973.

== Military career ==
=== Air Force pilot in Southeast Asia ===
He was commissioned as a second lieutenant through the Air Force Reserve Officer Training Corps program in November 1955 and completed pilot training at Laughlin Air Force Base, Texas, in May 1957. His initial operational assignments included flight instruction, flight test and aircraft maintenance positions with Air Training Command.

In August 1961, Abrahamson was assigned as spacecraft project officer on the VELA Nuclear Detection Satellite Program at Los Angeles Air Force Station, California. From October 1964 to August 1965, while assigned to the 428th Tactical Fighter Squadron, Cannon Air Force Base, New Mexico, he served two temporary tours of duty in Southeast Asia, where he flew 49 combat missions.

=== Astronaut selection ===
He graduated from Air Command and Staff College as a distinguished graduate in July 1966. He then attended the Aerospace Research Pilot School at Edwards Air Force Base, California, and, upon graduation, served as an astronaut with the Air Force's Manned Orbiting Laboratory Program from August 1967 until the program was canceled in June 1969. Abrahamson never flew in space, and therefore does not wear astronaut wings.

Abrahamson then served on the staff of the National Aeronautics and Space Council in the Executive Office of the President of the United States. In March 1971 he became manager of the TV-guided, air-to-ground Maverick missile program at Headquarters Aeronautical Systems Division, Wright-Patterson Air Force Base, Ohio. In June 1973, he assumed command of the 4950th Test Wing there.

In March 1974, Abrahamson was assigned as inspector general, Air Force Systems Command, Andrews Air Force Base, Maryland. From May 1976 to July 1980 he served as director for the F-16 Multinational Air Combat Fighter Program, Aeronautical Systems Division, Wright-Patterson Air Force Base. He then became deputy chief of staff for systems at Air Force Systems Command headquarters.

In November 1981, he was assigned as associate administrator for the Space Transport System, National Aeronautics and Space Administration (NASA) Headquarters, Washington, D.C., where he was responsible for the Space Shuttle Program. During his tenure, the Shuttle achieved 10 developmental and early operational launches, and demonstrated its operational capabilities by achieving the first satellite retrieval and repair mission.

=== Strategic Defense Initiative ===
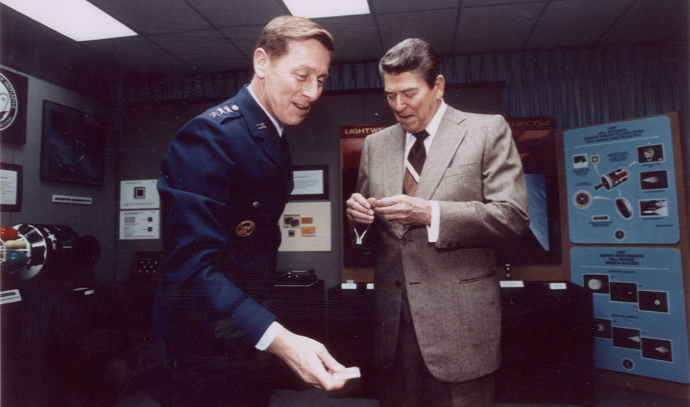
Lt. Gen. James Abrahamson & President Ronald Reagan at Strategic Defense Initiative Labs

Abrahamson was appointed by President Ronald Reagan to be the first director of the Strategic Defense Initiative ("SDI") in April 1984. The "Star Wars" program, as SDI's detractors dubbed it, was initiated to develop a sophisticated anti-ballistic missile system that would prevent missile attacks from other countries, particularly the Soviet Union. Some countries opposed to U.S. missile defense efforts raised concerns about the program "contravening" the strategic defense systems portion of the Strategic Arms Limitation Talks Agreement (SALT I) in the years before the program was enacted.

Ultimately, concerns about the objectives of SDI and fiscal budgetary constraints forced the Reagan administration to announce the program would cease.

Abrahamson was promoted to lieutenant general on July 21, 1982. He retired from the U.S. Air Force on March 1, 1989, and entered professional life.

== Flight information ==
- Rating: Command Pilot
- Flight Hours: more than 3,000
- Aircraft Flown:

== Military awards and decorations ==
=== Badges ===
Badge	Description
	US Air Force Command Pilot Badge
	Command Space and Missile Badge
	Master Missile Maintenance Badge
	Office of the Secretary of Defense Identification Badge

=== Ribbons ===
Ribbon	Description	Notes
	Air Force Distinguished Service Medal	
Width-44 crimson ribbon with a pair of width-2 white stripes on the edges	Legion of Merit	with two bronze oak leaf clusters
	Meritorious Service Medal	
	Air Medal	with bronze oak leaf cluster
	Air Force Commendation Medal	
	Air Force Outstanding Unit Award	
	Air Force Organizational Excellence Award	
	NASA Distinguished Service Medal	
Width=44 scarlet ribbon with a central width-4 golden yellow stripe, flanked by pairs of width-1 scarlet, white, Old Glory blue, and white stripes	National Defense Service Medal	
	Vietnam Service Medal	with bronze service star
	Air Force Longevity Service Award	with one silver and two bronze oak leaf clusters
	Small Arms Expert Marksmanship Ribbon	
	Belgium Order of Leopold	
	The Netherlands' Order of Orange-Nassau	Grand Officer with Swords (29-09-1980)
	The Royal Norwegian Order of St. Olav	
	Vietnam Campaign Medal	

=== Other notable achievements ===
- 1984 Received the General Bernard A. Schriever Award for outstanding achievement in support of Air Force missile and space programs
- 1986 Received the Dr. Robert H. Goddard Trophy for leadership and excellence in advancing space flight programs contributing to United States leadership in astronautics
- 1987 Honored as Man of the Year in Science and Technology from the Achievement Rewards for College Scientists Foundation, Metropolitan Chapter, Washington, D.C.
- Received honorary doctorate degrees in engineering from New York University, Utah State University and Rensselaer Polytechnic Institute

== Effective dates of promotion ==
Promotions
Insignia	Rank	Date
	Lieutenant general	July 21, 1982

== Professional life ==
Lt. Gen. Abrahamson was executive vice president for corporate development for Hughes Aircraft Company from October 1989 to April 1992 and as president of the transportation sector for Hughes Aircraft Company from April 1992 to September 1992.

From 1992 to 1995, he served as chairman of the board of directors of Oracle Corporation. From 1996, he served as an adviser to FAA's Next Generation Air Transportation System, and founded International Air Safety LLC to bring the NextGen System researches to other civil aviation authorities.

In 1998, he became a director of ORBIMAGE and would become its chairman, overseeing the company's evolution into GeoEye, the world's largest space imaging company. In January 2013, GeoEye was merged with DigitalGlobe Corporation and Abrahamson was appointed to the board of directors of the newly merged company.

Lt. Gen. Abrahamson was also involved in efforts to commercialize stratospheric airships. He serves as chairman and chief executive officer of StratCom LLC, SkySentry LLC and SkySpectrum LLC, privately held companies associated with the development of high-altitude vehicles (HAVs) for civil and military applications.

He also served in the past as a member of the board of directors of Global Relief Technologies, Inc., a privately held company dedicated to improving disaster management and recovery through the use of high technology. Global Relief partnered with GeoEye and Telenor Services in the mid-2000s to provide timely satellite imagery to emergency relief workers operating in remote areas of the world.

Lt. Gen. Abrahamson also served as a member of the board of directors of an AIM-listed company, Crescent Technology Ventures PLC ("CTV"), in the mid-2000s. CTV was founded to develop security technologies.
