= Space imaging =

Space imaging may refer to:

- Astronomical image processing of objects usually beyond the Solar System
- Earth imaging satellites
- Images processed that are produced from the exploration of Mars
- Images produced by any uncrewed space mission
- Images taken by any crewed space mission
- Other images from the history of space exploration. See the timeline of planetary exploration

Companies

- Space Imaging Corporation
- other remote sensing companies
