= Space Imaging Middle East =

Commercial provider of imagery & GIS solutions

- Company type: Regional Affiliate of GeoEye
- Founded: 1997
- Headquarters: Dubai, United Arab Emirates
- Key people: Mohammed El-Kadi, Managing Director
- Website: SpaceImagingME.com

Space Imaging Middle East LLC (SIME) is a regional affiliate of DigitalGlobe, the largest commercial remote sensing company in the world.

Established in 1997, SIME started off by introducing high-resolution satellite imagery to the Middle East region, operating from government-run ground stations. Today, SIME, headquartered in the United Arab Emirates, is a leading Geo-Spatial and GIS solutions provider throughout the Middle East, the Persian Gulf, Eastern Africa and Central Asia.

SIME's products and services include photogrammetry, mapping, GIS, 3D models, imagery analysis and reporting software, vehicle tracking, consulting, and training, among others. SIME engages in technology partnerships with leading technology companies, and owns and operates a wide range of sources for satellite and aerial imagery.

The company's profile was raised during the 2003 Iraq War, when high-resolution satellite imagery licensed from SIME was used by some news organizations to give the public "bird's eye views" of various key Iraqi locations, such as Fallujah, and Baghdad.

In 2003 SIME supplied 1-meter resolution imagery of Afghanistan to the United Nations Office on Drugs and Crime (UNODC), as part of a survey to monitor the production of illicit crops.

== Remote sensing technology ==
SIME offers imagery collected from various earth observation satellites and aerial sensors, with resolutions varying from 15 centimeters to 20 meters. SIME's satellite constellation includes the Indian Remote Sensing satellite (IRS), IKONOS and CARTOSAT satellites. SIME controls its satellite constellation via a ground station based in the UAE. The Company also has an aircraft permanently stationed in the region to collect aerial imagery.

== Partners and subsidiaries ==
SIME is the main investor of European Space Imaging in Munich, Germany, which gives SIME direct access to the latest in European satellite technology. SIME has partnered with the German Aerospace Center (DLR) to operate the ground station and to develop hosting and delivery systems of data. It has also teamed up with GAF AG of Munich to provide specialized remote-sensing studies. SIME has established a joint venture with Sanborn Incorporated to provide aerial imaging products and advanced modeling solutions. In the Far East, the Company has teamed up with Mappoint Asia to provide vehicle and asset tracking systems.

== Satellite coverage area ==
Having direct access to two receiving stations in Germany and UAE, SIME’s satellite reach extensively covers an area extending from the Arctic Circle in the north to the Persian Gulf region in the south and from the Indian Ocean in the east to the Atlantic Ocean in the west. SIME has a substantial satellite and aerial imagery archive, and owns all the images in its database which contain multiple covers of the region spanning a period of several years.

== Applications ==
SIME offers applications to a variety of industries in both the government and commercial sectors. These include:

- Aviation
- Environment Protection
- Mapping
- Military & Intelligence
- Oil & Gas
- Security & Relief
- Telecommunications
- Urban Planning & Infrastructure Development
