= United States aviator badges =

Badges issued to U.S. uniformed services pilots

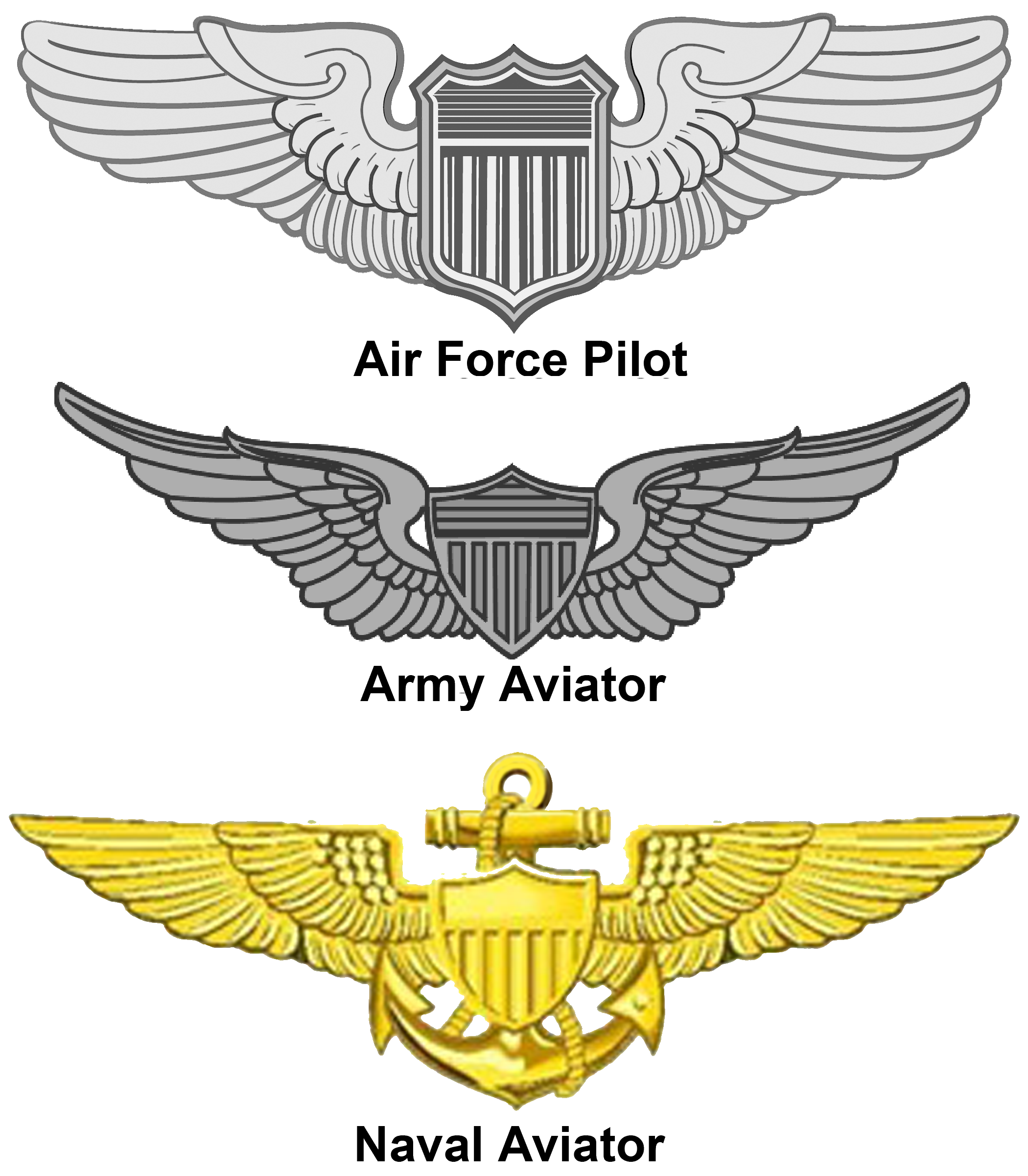
- From top to bottom: the basic United States Air Force Pilot Badge, United States Army Aviator Badge, and the Naval Aviator Insignia (issued by the United States Navy, United States Marine Corps, United States Coast Guard)
- Type: Badge
- Awarded for: Qualification as a pilot in a United States uniformed service which awards an aviator badge
- Presented by: United States Armed Forces
- Eligibility: United States uniformed services personnel and allied military personnel attending a U.S. military aviator course
- Status: Currently awarded
- Established: Varies
- First award: Varies

Army Precedence
- Next (higher): Military Free Fall Parachutist Badge
- Next (lower): Astronaut Device
- Related: United States astronaut badges United States aircrew badges

The United States aviator badges (commonly referred to as "wings") refers to the various aviator badges and insignia issued by the uniformed services of the United States; the United States Army, United States Air Force (USAF), United States Navy (USN), United States Marine Corps (USMC), United States Coast Guard (USCG), and the National Oceanographic and Atmospheric Administration Commissioned Officer Corps (NOAA Corps) to qualified aircraft pilots. The United States Space Force (USSF) and the United States Public Health Service Commissioned Corps (USPHSCC) are the only uniformed services which do not issue their own aviator badges; however, USSF and USPHSCC personnel are authorized to wear most badges earned from another uniformed service, to include aviator badges.

The NOAA Corps, USN, USMC, and USCG all issue an aviator badge in a single degree, with the latter three branches sharing the same design. The Army and USAF each issue distinct badges to their aviators, with each badge authorized in three degrees to recognize skill and experience levels. All U.S. armed services (excluding the USSF) issue aircrew badges to personnel that are not pilots but are regularly engaged in flight as part of their official duties. The Army, USAF, USN (USMC medical personnel are provided by the USN), and USCG also all issue various "wings" to aviation medical personnel, such as the Army Flight Surgeon Badge, the USAF Flight Nurse Badge, the USN Aerospace Experimental Psychologist Badge, and the USCG Flight Surgeon Badge, among others. The USAF additionally issues a variety of "aeronautical" insignia to flying personnel that are neither "aviator" nor "aircrew" badges, such as the USAF Combat Systems Officer Badge or the USAF Air Battle Manager Badge.

The USAF's civilian auxiliary, the Civil Air Patrol; and the USCG's civilian auxiliary, the United States Coast Guard Auxiliary, both issue unique aviator badges, while also permitting wear of military badges, to include aviator badges. Civilian airlines in the U.S. (and globally) generally issue aviator badges to pilots, and may also issue modified variants of the same badges to other crew members (flight engineers, flight stewards, loadmasters, etc), though some entities utilize dedicated aircrew badges to recognize non-pilots. Other, non-military, non-airline U.S. entities may also issue or award aviator badges; The Federal Aviation Administration (FAA) offers badges in varying degrees to recognize completion of various stages of the FAA's WINGS Pilot Proficiency Program. U.S. federal, state, and local law enforcement agencies may issue aviator and aircrew badges to personnel that qualify as law enforcement pilots or aircrew, respectively. U.S. civilian flight schools, aviation clubs and organizations (e.g. Seaplane Pilots Association or the Experimental Aircraft Association), and youth programs (e.g. Boy Scouts of America or Aviation Career Exploring) also issue a variety of aviator badges (usually but not always modeled as "wings").

== United States Air Force ==
=== World War I ===
The first United States Aviator Badges were issued to members of the Air Service during World War I. The badges were issued in three degrees: Observer (a "US" shield and one left-side wing), Junior Aviator or Reserve Aviation Officer (a "US" shield between two wings), and Senior Aviator (a star over "US" shield between two wings). The Army Air Service also issued a badge for balloon pilots, known as the Aeronaut Badge (later re-named to the "Balloon Pilot Badge").

Enlisted Aviators wore their regular rank insignia and the Observer's badge. There were 29 enlisted pilots before the American entry into World War I. The second enlisted aviator, William A. Lamkey, got a discharge and flew for Pancho Villa. The remaining enlisted pilots received commissions in 1917. There were 60 enlisted mechanics who were trained as pilots in France during the war, but they were used for ferrying duties and did not fly in combat. The recruiting and training of enlisted Aviators ended in 1933.

=== World War II ===
Command Pilot Badge, World War II U.S. Army Air Forces design and current U.S. Air Force regulation insignia

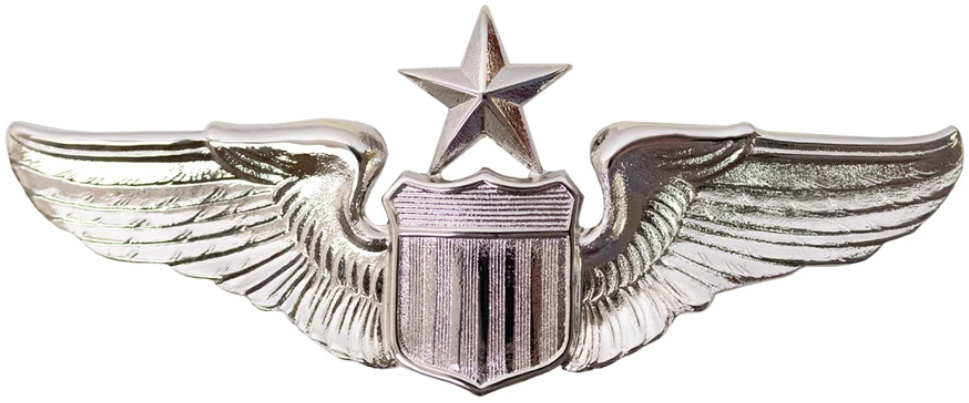
Senior Pilot Badge, World War II U.S. Army Air Forces and U.S. Air Force sample image

During World War II, with the rise of the Army Air Forces (USAAF), a second series of aviator badges were issued to include a design that has survived to the modern day. The Pilot Badge was issued in three degrees, including Pilot, Senior Pilot, and Command Pilot. A polished silver colored version of these badges is currently used as the United States Air Force Pilot Badges.

From August 1941 to November 1942, the Enlisted Aviator program was restarted. Candidates had to be at least 18, possess a high school diploma, and have graduated at the top of their high school class. Graduates were rated as Flight Staff Sergeants or Flight Technical Sergeants and wore the same pilot's wings as officers. They were usually assigned to pilots of transport and auxiliary aircraft to free officer pilots to pilot the more prestigious fighters and bombers. Auxiliary pilots received their own special wings to indicate their status and specialty. In November 1942 all enlisted pilots were promoted to Flight Officer rank and enlisted cadets were graded as Flight Officers or Second Lieutenants depending on merit. The qualifying requirements for the Senior Pilot Wings are: Seven (7) years as rated pilot and permanent award of pilot rating. Plus 2000 total hours or 1300 hours primary and instructor flight (refer to U.S. Air Force aeronautical rating for details).

=== Independent USAF ===
In 1947, the USAAF became its own separate service as the U.S. Air Force (USAF). The USAF uses the same pilot's badges as the earlier USAAF design, except that starting in the mid-1990s, they began to be made of chrome metal or sterling silver rather than the dull alloy wings used by the Army Air Forces and Air Force from 1947 to the mid-1990s.

=== Modern USAF ===
The USAF, unique among the United States uniformed services divides its flying service-members into "rated" and "non-rated" (or "un-rated") personnel. Rated aviators are pilots and RPA (unmanned combat aerial vehicle) pilots, issued the USAF Pilot Badge and USAF RPA Pilot Badge, respectively. Both badges are issued in three degrees, corresponding with an individual's "rating;" "pilot/RPA pilot," "senior pilot/RPA pilot," and "command pilot/RPA pilot."

Rated personnel that are not aviators are classified as "aeronautical" personnel and are navigators, combat systems officers (CSOs), air battle managers (ABMs), and observers. Each career field is authorized a unique badge (only navigators and CSOs share a badge design despite the badges officially bearing separate names) and each badge is divided into three degrees, corresponding with an individual's aeronautical rating; "navigator/CSO/ABM/observer;" "senior navigator/CSO/ABM/observer;" and "master navigator/CSO/ABM/observer."

Rated medical personnel encompass two career fields; the USAF flight surgeon career field, which is issued its own badge, complete with three degrees; "flight surgeon," "senior flight surgeon," and "chief flight surgeon." The USAF pilot-physician is the second rated medical career, where a qualified physician may become both a USAF flight surgeon and USAF pilot (or RPA pilot). Such personnel don both the USAF Pilot Badge (or USAF RPA Pilot Badge) and the USAF Flight Surgeon Badge, each worn in the appropriate degree for each profession.

Non-rated flyers are considered "aircrew" and are awarded either the USAF Enlisted Aircrew Badge or the USAF Officer Aircrew Badge. Despite not bearing aeronautical "ratings," both badges are issued in three degrees. The USAF Officer Aircrew Badge is issued infrequently, and is likely one of the rarer "wings" issued by the USAF.

The USAF Astronaut Badge is any rated USAF aviator or aeronautical badge adorned with the "Astronaut Device" attached to the badge's center element. Un-rated USAF personnel that qualify as astronauts are rated as a USAF observer and issued the USAF Observer Badge adorned with the Astronaut Device.

== United States Army ==
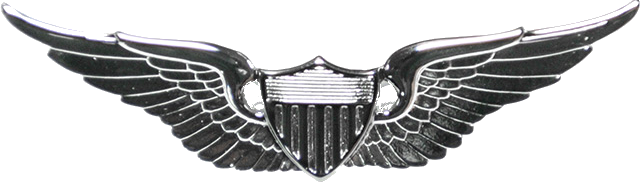
United States Army Aviator Badge ("basic" grade)

After the creation of the U.S. Air Force as a separate service in 1947, Army Aviation continued to a degree that warranted a new badge for Army Aviators (who piloted light observation and liaison airplanes and helicopters). The result was the creation of the Army Aviator Badge, which is a modified version of the U.S. Air Force Pilot Badge. It comes in three grades: Basic, Senior (7 years' service and 1,000 flight hours, pilot-in-command status), and Master (15 years' service and 2,000 flight hours, pilot-in-command status). The Aviator and Senior Aviator Badges were approved on 27 July 1950 and the Master Aviator Badge was approved on 12 February 1957.

== United States Navy, Marine Corps and Coast Guard ==
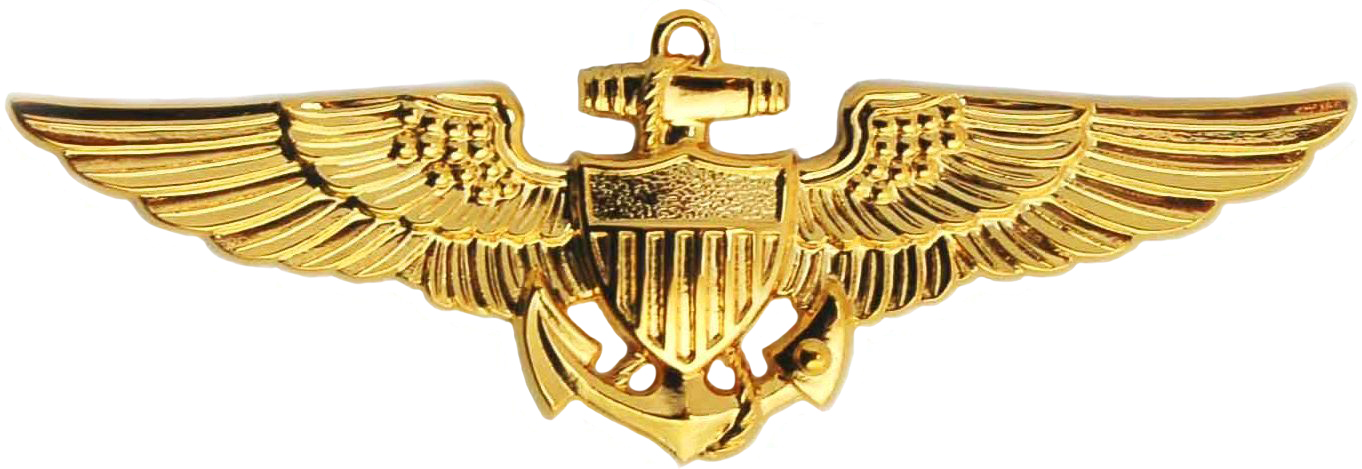
Naval aviator insignia; Unlike the equivalent U.S. Army and U.S. Air Force badges, the naval aviator insignia is issued in a single grade. However, other aviation insignia for other professions exist

The aviator badge currently used in the Navy has remained virtually unchanged since it was first issued on 13 November 1917. The Naval Aviator Insignia (sometimes referred to as "naval aviator wings") is earned by all U.S. Navy, U.S. Marine Corps, and U.S. Coast Guard aviators upon graduation from advanced flight training. Additional aviator badges exist for naval flight officers (USN & USMC), naval flight surgeons, naval aviation physiologists, naval flight nurses, naval aviation observers (USN & USMC) and enlisted naval aircrewman (USN, USMC & USCG). Naval aviators' badges are gold in color. Unlike the Air Force and the Army, the naval services do not employ senior or command/master aeronautical ratings.

== NOAA Commissioned Officer Corps ==
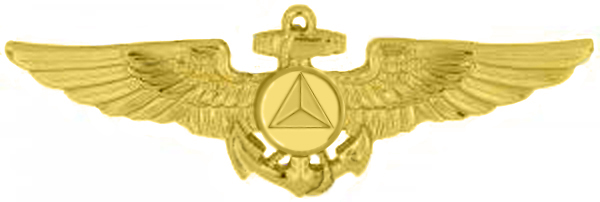
NOAA Aviator insignia

The NOAA Commissioned Officer Corps Aviator Insignia is a gold-colored pin, winged, with a central device consisting of a fouled anchor surcharged with a NOAA Corps device. NOAA Corps officer pilots and navigators may wear the NOAA aviator insignia after authorization by the Director of the NOAA Corps.

== NASA ==
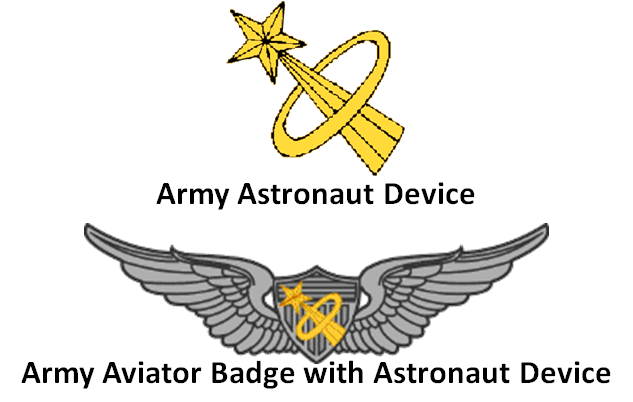
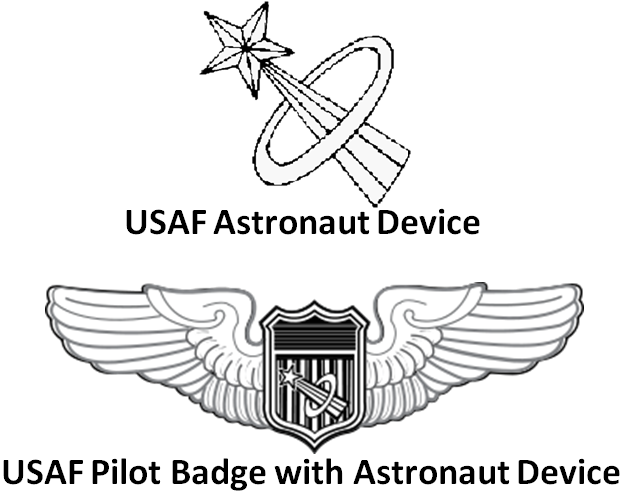
Astronaut Device worn on aviation badges of the United States Military

With the dawn of the Space Age, all of the United States Aviator badges are upgradable to the Astronaut Badge, for those military members who become astronauts.

== See also ==
- United States aircrew badges
- United States astronaut badges
- United States balloon pilot badges
- United States diver badges
- United States recruiter awards
- Badges of the United States Air Force
- Badges of the United States Army
- Badges of the United States Coast Guard
- Badges of the United States Marine Corps
- Badges of the United States Navy
- Badges of the United States Space Force
- Flight Officer Badge
- Naval Aviator Badge
- Navigator Badge
- Military badges of the United States
- Obsolete badges of the United States military
