= Lance W. Lord =

United States Air Force general

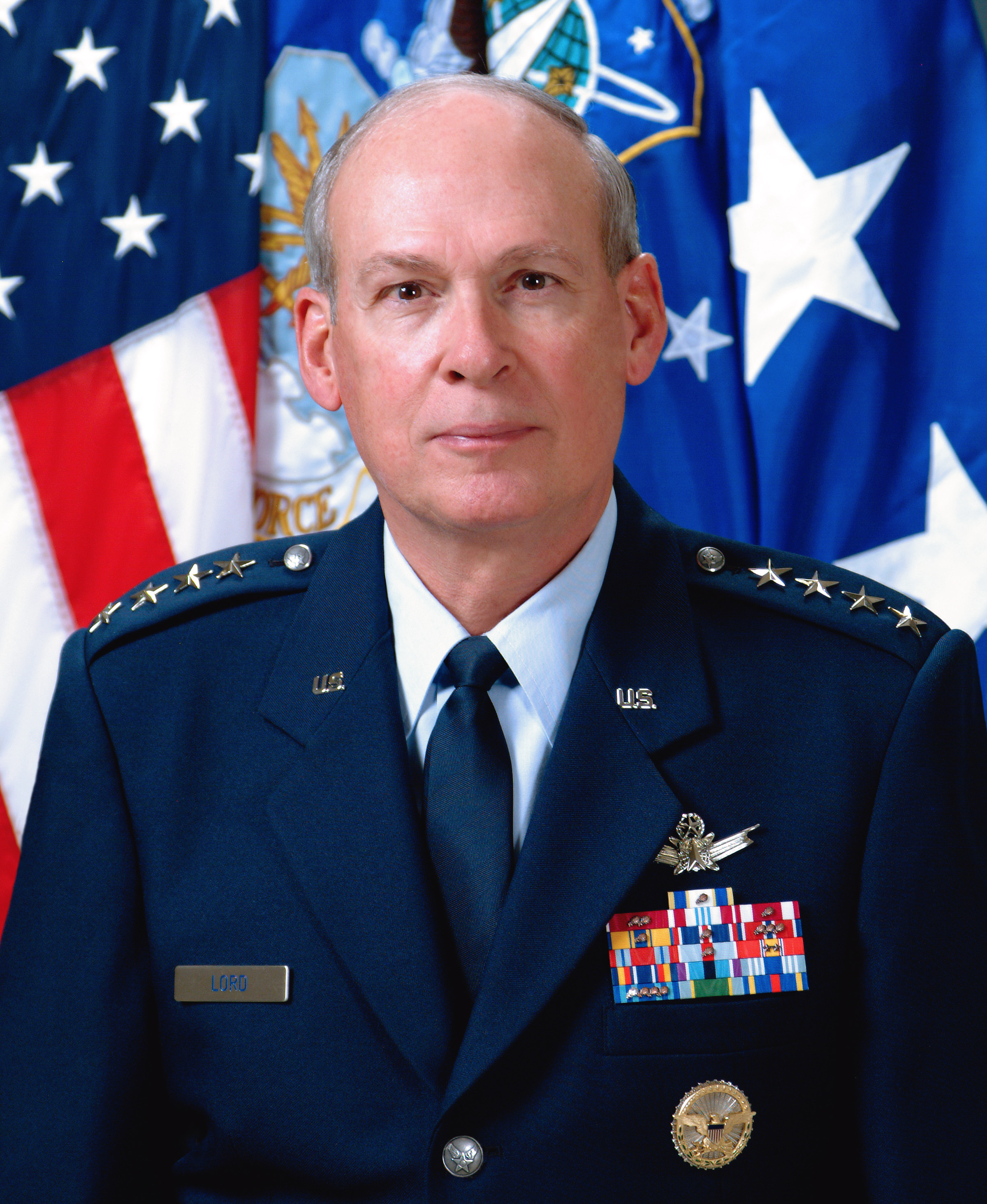
- General Lance W. Lord
- Born: July 12, 1946 (age 80); Philadelphia, Pennsylvania
- Military career
- Allegiance: United States
- Branch: United States Air Force
- Service years: 1968–2006
- Rank: General
- Commands: Air Force Space Command; Air University; Second Air Force; 30th Space Wing and Western Range; 90th Missile Wing; 321st Strategic Missile Wing
- Awards: Air Force Distinguished Service Medal (2); Legion of Merit (3)

General Lance W. Lord (born July 12, 1946) is a retired four-star general in the United States Air Force who served as Commander of Air Force Space Command at Peterson Air Force Base in Colorado.

== Military career ==
Lord was educated at Castle Heights Military Academy and Otterbein College, where he earned a bachelor's degree and graduated from the ROTC program. He later earned a master's degree from the University of North Dakota. After entering the Air Force in 1969, he served four years of Minuteman II ICBM alert duty and then completed a series of Air Staff and joint duty assignments in strategic missiles. He directed the Ground-Launched Cruise Missile Program Management Office in Europe. He was a Military Assistant to the Director of Net Assessment in the Office of the Secretary of Defense and represented the Air Force as a research associate in international security affairs at Ohio State University.

Lord commanded two ICBM wings in Wyoming and North Dakota. In California he commanded a space wing responsible for satellite launch and ballistic missile test launch operations. He served as Director of Plans and as Vice Commander for Headquarters Air Force Space Command. The general led Air Force education and training as Commandant of Squadron Officer School, Commander of Second Air Force, Commander of Air University and Director of Education for Air Education and Training Command. Prior to assuming command of Space Command, he was the Assistant Vice Chief of Staff of the Air Force. He retired on April 1, 2006.

In 2004 while serving as Air Force Space Command Commander, Lord announced the introduction of a new space badge. The new combined Space and Missile Operations Badge, informally known as "spings" (SPace wINGS), "Space Boomerang", or "Space Blade" replaced the Missile Badge for operators. In addition, the new badge is no longer limited to pure space and missile operators/maintainers, but is also awarded to 61XX, 62XX and 63XX (officer) AFSCs who have performed space/ICBM acquisition duties, even if they were non-operational in nature.

== Assignments ==
- January 1969 – February 1969, student, ICBM operational readiness training, Chanute AFB, Illinois
- February 1969 – May 1969, student, combat crew missile training, Vandenberg AFB, California
- May 1969 – June 1973, Minuteman II combat crewmember, 321st Strategic Missile Wing, Grand Forks AFB, North Dakota
- June 1973 – September 1975, Minuteman II evaluation member, 3901st Strategic Missile Evaluation Squadron, Vandenberg AFB, California
- September 1975 – August 1976, missile operations staff officer, Air Staff Training Program, Directorate of Operations, Headquarters U.S. Air Force, Washington, D.C.
- August 1976 – July 1978, missile operations staff officer, Strategic Division, Directorate of Operations and Readiness, Headquarters U.S. Air Force, Washington, D.C.
- July 1978 – July 1979, student, Air Command and Staff College, Maxwell AFB, Alabama
- July 1979 – July 1982, military assistant to the Director for Net Assessment, Office of the Secretary of Defense, Washington, D.C.
- July 1982 – July 1983, Air Force research associate, Program of International Security and Military Affairs, Ohio State University, Columbus
- July 1983 – August 1984, Commander, 10th Strategic Missile Squadron, Malmstrom AFB, Montana
- August 1984 – June 1985, Deputy Commander, 341st Combat Support Group, Malmstrom AFB, Montana
- July 1985 – July 1987, Director, Ground-Launched Cruise Missile Program Management Office, Deputy Chief of Staff for Plans and Programs, Headquarters U.S. Air Forces in Europe, Ramstein Air Base, West Germany
- July 1987 – June 1988, student, Air War College, Maxwell AFB, Alabama
- June 1988 – February 1989, Vice Commander, 351st Strategic Missile Wing, Whiteman AFB, Missouri
- February 1989 – May 1990, Commander, 321st Strategic Missile Wing, Grand Forks AFB, North Dakota
- June 1990 – August 1992, Commandant, Squadron Officer School, Maxwell AFB, Alabama
- August 1992 – August 1993, Commander, 90th Missile Wing, Francis E. Warren AFB, Wyoming
- August 1993 – August 1995, Commander, 30th Space Wing and Western Range, Vandenberg Air Force Base, California
- August 1995 – August 1996, Director of Plans, Headquarters Air Force Space Command, Peterson AFB, Colorado
- August 1996 – August 1997, Commander, 2nd Air Force, Keesler AFB, Mississippi
- August 1997 – June 1999, Vice Commander, Headquarters Air Force Space Command, Peterson AFB, Colorado
- June 1999 – May 2001, Commander, Air University, Maxwell AFB, Alabama
- May 2001 – April 2002, Assistant Vice Chief of Staff, Headquarters U.S. Air Force, Washington, D.C.
- April 2002 – April 2006, Commander, Air Force Space Command, Peterson AFB, Colorado

== Awards and decorations ==
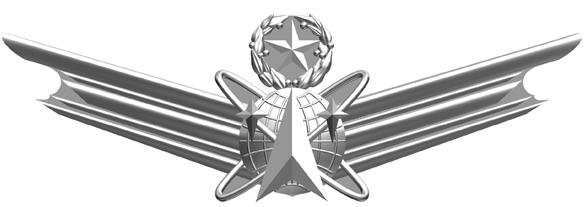
Master Space Operations Badge
Office of the Secretary of Defense Identification Badge

Air Force Distinguished Service Medal with one bronze oak leaf cluster
Legion of Merit with two oak leaf clusters
Defense Meritorious Service Medal
Meritorious Service Medal with two oak leaf clusters
Air Force Commendation Medal with oak leaf cluster
Air Force Outstanding Unit Award with oak leaf cluster
Air Force Organizational Excellence Award with three oak leaf clusters
Combat Readiness Medal
Air Force Recognition Ribbon with oak leaf cluster
National Defense Service Medal with two bronze service stars
Global War on Terrorism Service Medal
Humanitarian Service Medal
Air Force Overseas Long Tour Service Ribbon
Air Force Longevity Service Award with one silver and three bronze oak leaf clusters
Small Arms Expert Marksmanship Ribbon
Air Force Training Ribbon

== Other achievements ==
- 1988 Secretary of the Air Force Leadership Award, Air War College, Maxwell AFB, Alabama
- 1999 Gen. Thomas D. White Space Trophy, Air Force Association
- 2003 Gen. Bernard A. Schriever Fellow Award, Air Force Association, Northern Utah Chapter
- 2003 Distinguished Achievement Award, Air Force Association, Tennessee Ernie Ford Chapter
- 2004 Gen. James V. Hartinger Award, National Defense Industrial Association, Rocky Mountain Chapter
- 2004 Gen. Jimmy Doolittle Fellow Award, Air Force Association, Iron Gate Chapter
- 2004 Gen. Bernard A. Schriever Award, Air Force Association, Los Angeles Chapter
- 2005 Space Champion Award, National Defense Industrial Association
- 2006 Order of the Sword, Air Force Space Command

== Effective dates of promotion ==
- Second Lieutenant December 4, 1968
- First Lieutenant July 28, 1970
- Captain January 28, 1972
- Major September 1, 1978
- Lieutenant Colonel December 1, 1982
- Colonel December 1, 1985
- Brigadier General September 1, 1992
- Major General March 14, 1996
- Lieutenant General September 1, 1997
- General April 19, 2002
