= Space Operations Badge =

Space Operations Badge (USAF/USSF) Space Badge (USA)
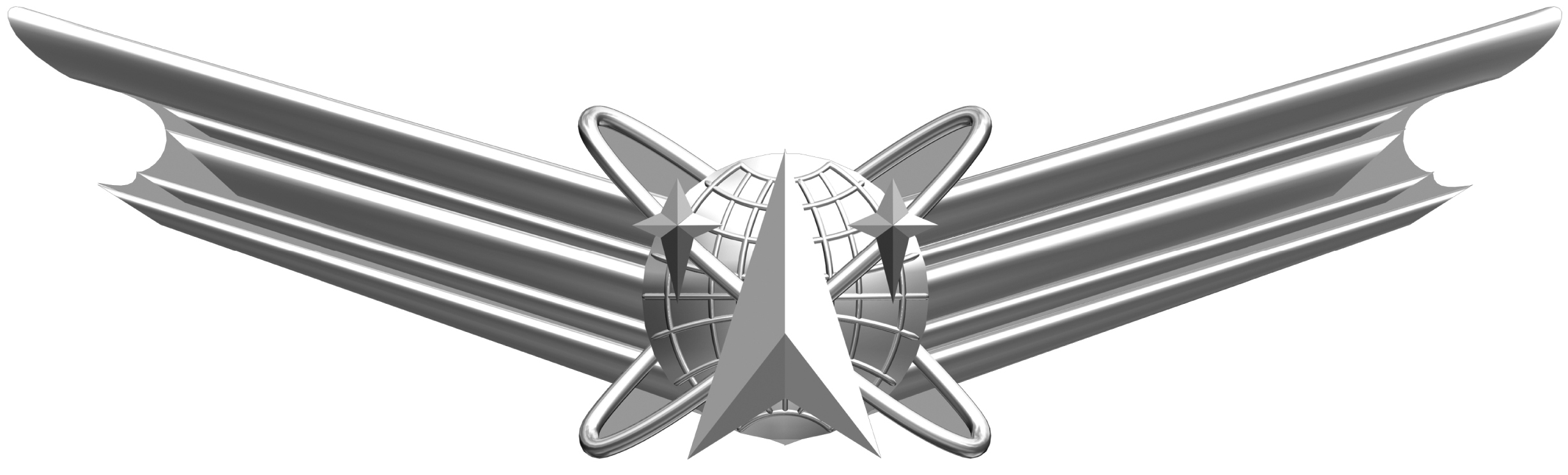
- Type: Occupational badge (USAF/USSF); Special skills badge (USA)
- Awarded for: Space operations
- Presented by: Department of the Air Force, and Department of the Army
- Status: Currently awarded
- First award: November 2005

Precedence
- Next (higher): U.S. Army – Aviator badges
- Equivalent: U.S. Air Force – Aeronautical, cyber, and missile badges
- Next (lower): U.S. Army – Driver and Mechanic Badge; U.S. Air Force – Occupational badges

The Space Operations Badge is an occupational badge for guardians of the United States Space Force and space airmen of the United States Air Force while the United States Army (USA) version of the badge, known as the Space Badge, is a special skills badge for soldiers who qualify as space professionals.

== History ==
=== Space and Missile Badge ===
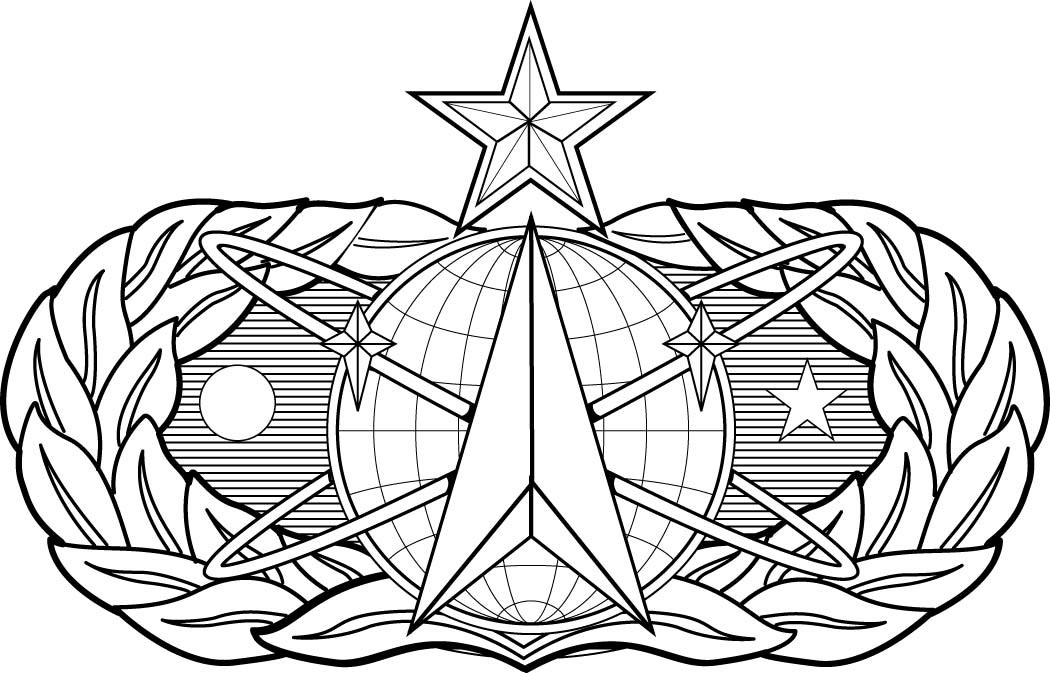

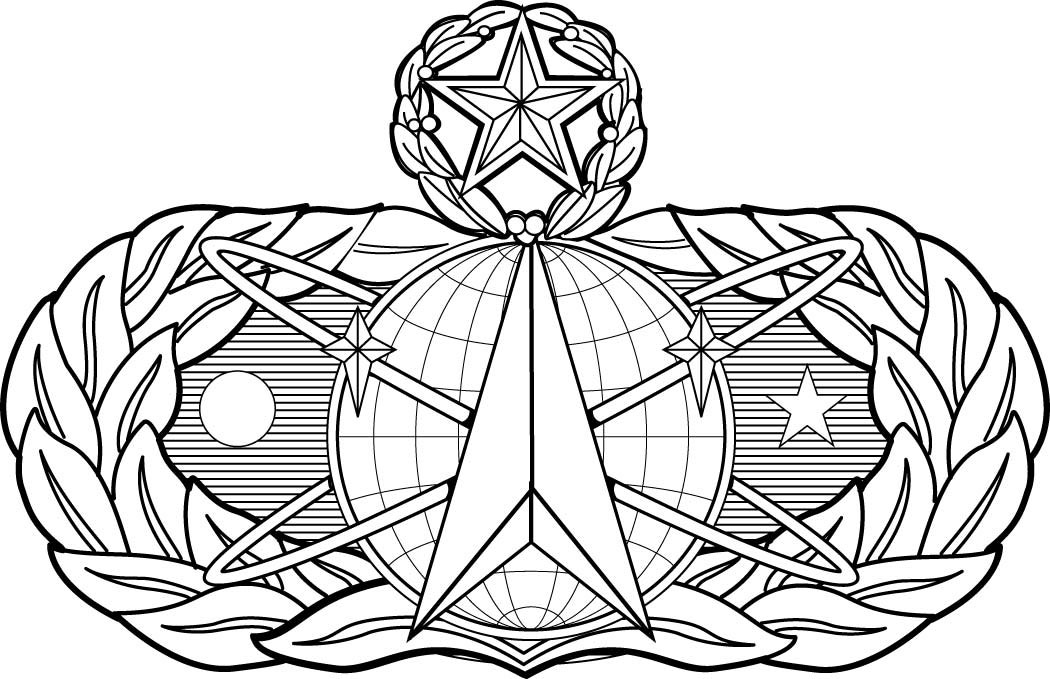
Former Basic, Senior, and Master Space and Missile Badges

The Air Force Space and Missile Badge (AFSMB) was a military badge of the United States Air Force which was awarded to airmen who completed space operations and missile training. It was introduced in 1982 and initially replaced the Missile Badge when the space and missile operations fields were merged. However, the Missile Badge was reinstated in 2009, and the space and missile careers were split in 2013.

The Air Force Space and Missile Badge was presented in three grades being that of basic, senior, and master. The basic badge was awarded for completion of initial space training while the senior and master badges were awarded based on years of service in Air Force Space assignments; for officer the steps occur at seven and fifteen years respectively. For enlisted personnel the senior badge was awarded upon attaining a "7 skill level" and the master badge as a Master Sergeant or above with five years in the specialty from award of the senior badge. The grades of the Air Force Space and Missile badge were denoted by a star (senior) and wreath (master) centered above the decoration.

The Space and Missile Badge was also awarded to U.S. Army officers who graduated from the functional area 40A (Army Space Operations Officer) course, becoming the first Air Force badge awarded by another service.

=== Space Operations Badge ===
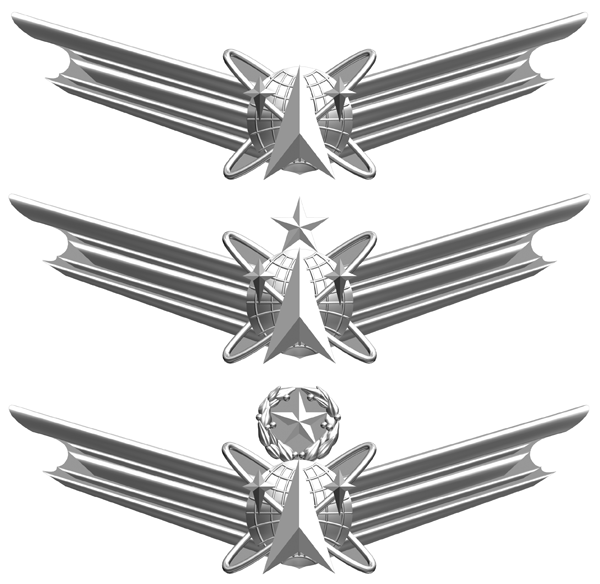
Space Operations Badges (USAF and USSF) Space Badges (USA) Top-to-bottom: Basic, Senior, and Master/Command

In 2004, the commander of U.S. Air Force Space Command, General Lance Lord, USAF, announced the introduction of the new Air Force Space Badge (AFSB), which replaced the Air Force Space and Missile Badge. The new badge was also awarded to U.S. Air Force scientists, engineers, communications, intelligence, and acquisition professionals who had performed space or missile operations, intelligence, and acquisition duties and had successfully completed the Space 100 course.

In 2006, the U.S. Army, with the consent of the Air Force, authorized the awarding of the Air Force Space Badge to Army personnel who meet specific guidelines for training and time in a space billet. On 19 October 2006, SGT Daniel Holscher, a satellite control operations noncommissioned officer with U.S. Army Central Space Support Element, was the first enlisted soldier to earn the Air Force Space Badge.

In February 2011, the U.S. Air Force and U.S. Army officially approved the establishment of the Air Force Space Badge as a joint Air Force and Army badge; thus, the words "Air Force" were dropped from the official name of the badge. U.S. Army soldiers can be awarded the Space Badge after attending Air Force or Army space or satellite systems courses and have 12 months (for Active Army) or 24 months (for Army Reserve and Army National Guard) experience in a space billet. This new badge is also awarded to graduates of the FA-40A Army Space Operations Officer course.

In January 2014, General William L. Shelton, commander of Air Force Space Command, ordered the renaming of the Space Badge to the Space Operations Badge for the Air Force and changed the criteria for eligibility. The Space Operations Badge was then restricted to Air Force Specialty Codes 13S and 1C6, but can be earned by non-operations personnel after meeting certain criteria. For airmen to now earn the Space Operations Badge, members must have completed three years of operations-focused duties and receive Air Force Space Command vice commander approval. To receive the Senior Space Operations Badge, members must complete seven years of operations-focused duties and get AFSPC vice commander approval. After completion of 15 years of operations-focused duties and AFSPC vice commander approval, airmen are eligible for the Command Space Operations Badge.

In 2019 and 2020 the Space Operations Badge was awarded to non-U.S. military members for the first time. In 2019 four Royal Canadian Air Force airmen assigned to the Combined Space Operations Center successfully completed U.S. Air Force space training and were awarded the Space Operations Badge, while in 2020 a Royal Air Force airman assigned to the 18th Space Control Squadron was the first United Kingdom citizen to earn the same.

Official heraldry of the Space Operations Badge: "The central globe represents the Earth as viewed from space, the Earth being the origin and control point for man's space endeavors. The global lines of latitude and longitude hearken to the original 20th Air Force patch and emphasize the global nature of the Air Force space mission. The thrusts and vectors behind the globe represent the dynamic and infinite space environment. The deltoid symbolizes the Air Force’s upward thrust into space, the reentry vehicles of our intercontinental ballistic missile force and the launch vehicles that place satellites in orbit. The ellipses represent orbital paths traced by satellites in Earth orbit; the satellites symbolically depicted as four-pointed stars. The symmetric placement of the satellites signifies the Air Force's worldwide coverage in accomplishing its mission."

The badge is informally referred to as "space wings" due to the resemblance to other aeronautical badges or "wings".

== See also ==
- Obsolete badges of the United States military
- Badges of the United States Space Force
- Badges of the United States Air Force
- Badges of the United States Army
