= Missile Badge =

Military decoration of the US Air Force for qualified missile personnel

USAF Missile Maintenance Badge, basic

The Missile Badge is a military decoration of the United States Air Force which was first created on 23 May 1958. The "pocket rocket" badge recognizes those commissioned officers and enlisted personnel of the US Air Force who have qualified as missile personnel (both TAC and SAC (now AFGSC)) that have been trained in the maintenance or launching of land-based and air-launched nuclear weapons under the direction of the National Command Authority. Originally known as the Missileman Badge, the Missile Badge later became known as the Missileer Badge or more informally the Pocket Rocket.

== History ==
Following its creation in 1958, the badge came in only one style. In 1963 the name was changed to the Missileman Badge and the three levels of Basic, Senior and Master were added. Although primarily issued to Atlas, Titan I/Titan II, Minuteman I/II/III and Peacekeeper missile crews of the Strategic Air Command (SAC), it was also issued to Tactical Air Command (TAC) Matador and Mace missile crews of the 1960s and Gryphon Ground Launched Cruise Missile (GLCM) crews of the 1980s and early 1990s. The badge, at all 3 levels, was also awarded to Air Defense Command personnel maintaining and on launch crews of both the BOMARC A/B and the Thor in the 1960s and 1970s. In the late 1980s, this badge was redesignated as the missile maintenance insignia while a new version bracketed by an oak wreath became the missile operations badge.

By 1992, all USAF tactical missiles were retired or in the process of being retired. The same year, SAC was inactivated and its ICBM force briefly transferred to the newly created Air Combat Command (ACC) before being transferred again to the Air Force Space Command (AFSPC). In 2004, the Air Force Space Command Commander, General Lance Lord, announced the introduction of a new space badge. The new combined Space and Missile Operations Badge was informally known as "spings" (SPace wINGS). The new badge was no longer limited to pure space and missile operators or maintainers, but was also awarded to those in Air Force Specialty Codes (AFSCs) 61XX, 62XX and 63XX who performed space/ICBM acquisition duties, even if they were non-operational in nature.

Also in 2004, Interim Change (IC) 2004-1 to AFI 36-2923 expanded the missile badge award criteria to include the 21M and 2W career fields. AFI 36-2923 was rendered obsolete and superseded by AFI 36-2903 dated 2 August 2006. 21M officers that do not complete MMOC must supervise 2M/2W personnel in maintenance loading and unloading for 12 months to be awarded the basic badge. 2W personnel are awarded the basic badge after working directly with guided missiles or missile systems for 12 months after completion of technical training school.

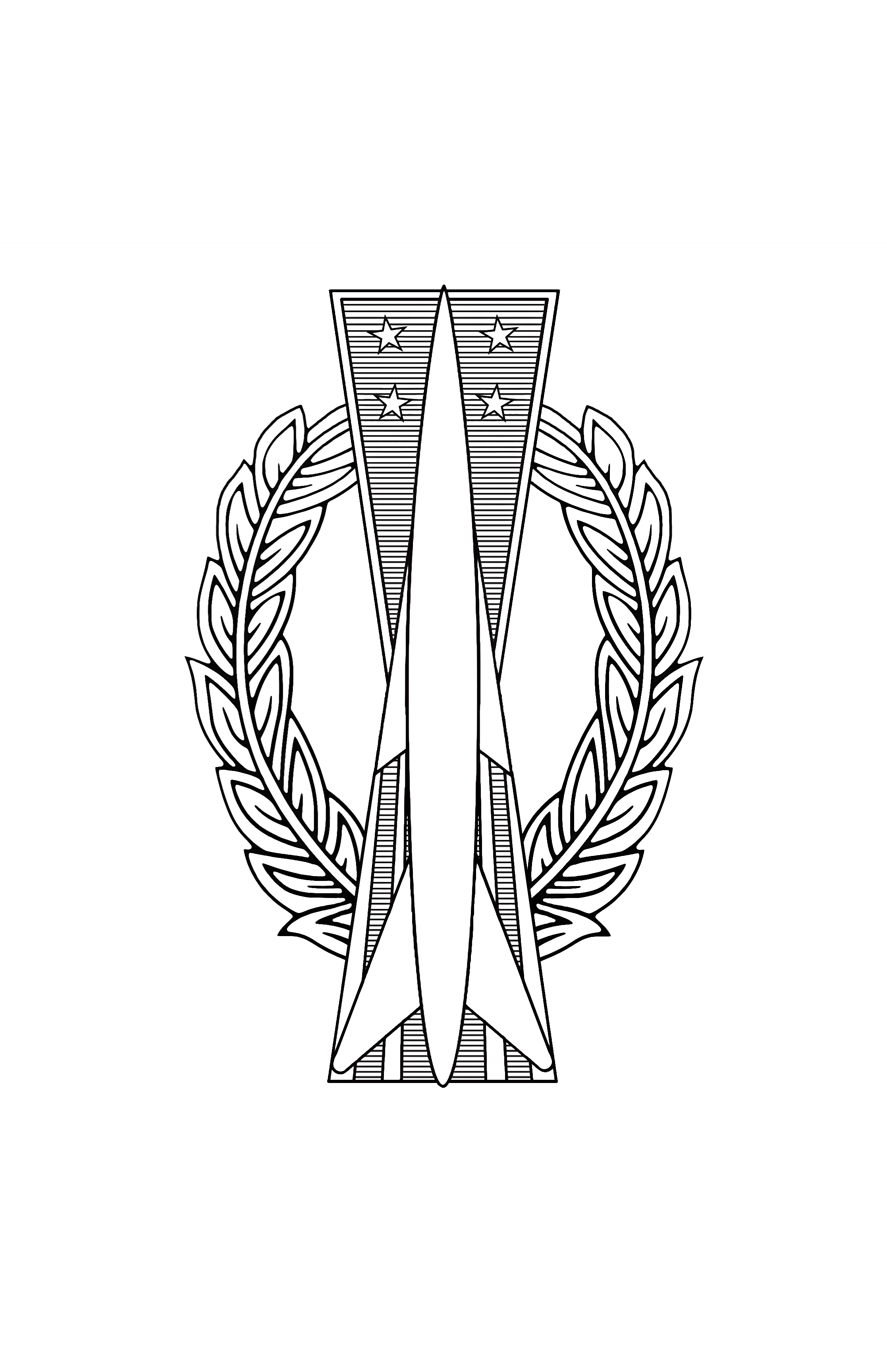
Missile Operator Badge (Basic)

After deactivation of the Titan missile system in 1987, enlisted personnel were no longer authorized to earn the Missile Badge with operations designator. However, all enlisted personnel assigned to nuclear silo maintenance duty are eligible to wear the standard Missile Badge (without the operations designator) if qualified under the military specialties 411XX or the new 2M0XX field. From 1991 to early 2006, the Missile Badge was the standard speciality badge for the above two career fields.

In June 2008, the Air Force Chief of Staff, General Michael Moseley, announced the return of the missile badge with operations designator for intercontinental ballistic missile crews. The missile badge may be worn with the space badge by those who qualify.

In 2011, the Air Force Space Command divested itself of the ICBM force and all USAF strategic nuclear missile operations and maintenance personnel were transferred to the newly created Air Force Global Strike Command (AFGSC)

The Missile Badge was also awarded to personnel engaged in satellite control duties in AFSCs 20xx and 308xx. Award required at least one year qualified as operationally ready in a satellite control position. Individuals who already awarded a missile badge were advanced one degree. The Missile Badge was replaced by the Space Badge (later designated as the Space and Missile Badge) for Space Operations personnel circa 1983.

In the 1960s and 1970s, some personnel involved in research and development in rockets and missiles were awarded Missileman badges, such as some personnel at the Air Force Rocket Propulsion Lab (AFRPL).

== Purpose and degrees ==
The Missile Badge is awarded as a permanent decoration upon a service member’s graduation from missile operations or maintenance officer training (if awarded to an officer) or from maintenance tech school if awarded to an enlisted service member. The badge is worn on the left breast pocket and is the largest of the U.S. Air Force speciality badges. It is also one of the few United States military badges which is not transferable between services, meaning that a qualified recipient, who transfers to another branch of the United States armed forces cannot display the Missile Badge on another service uniform.

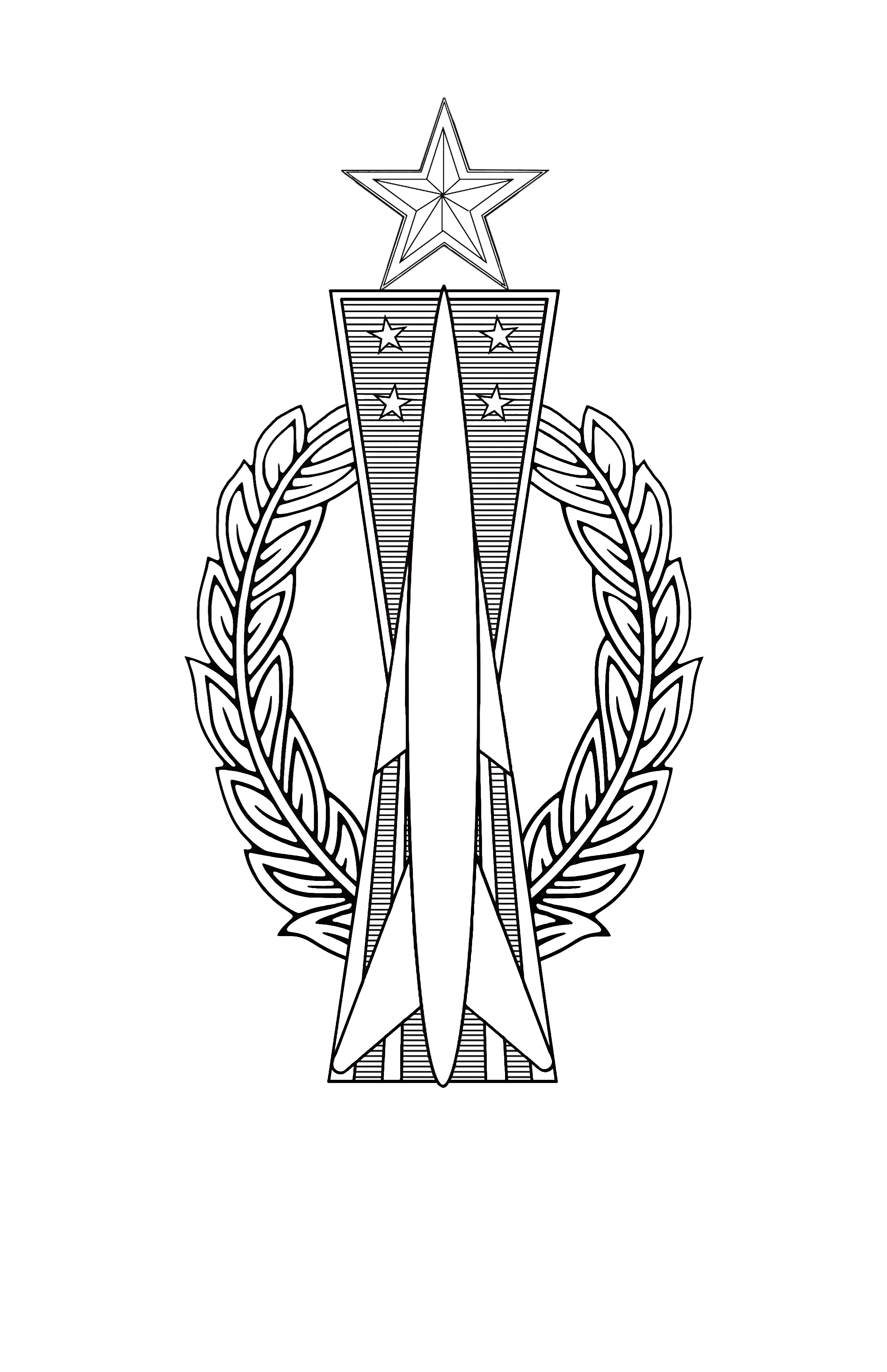
Missile Operator Badge (Senior)

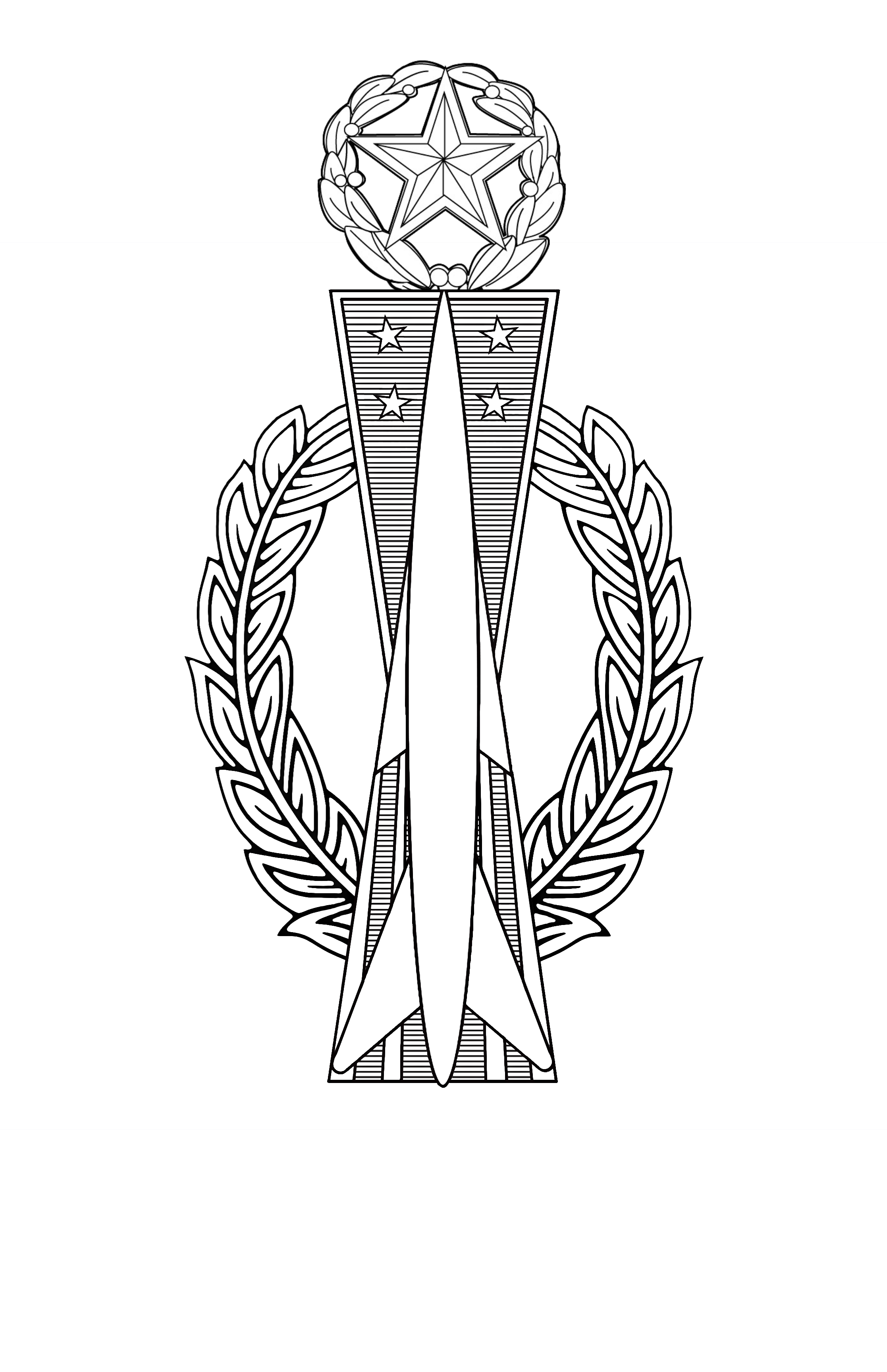
Missile Operator Badge (Master)

The Missile Badge is issued in three degrees: basic, senior, and master. The level of degree is determined by a service member’s years of missile duty in the Air Force and also the level of command responsibility held within the Air Force missile units. Any officer who is or has been combat mission ready (CMR), as a missile crewmember at an operational ICBM unit qualifies to wear the missile badge with operations designator—a wreath encircling the missile. The basic badge is awarded once the member graduates Initial Qualification Training at Vandenberg AFB. Officers with seven years of nuclear experience qualify for the senior badge, and they qualify for the master badge after fifteen years experience. The Senior Missile Badge is denoted by a star above the decoration, and the Master Missile Badge displaying a star surrounded by a small wreath.

The Missile Badge without operations designator is awarded to those qualified to perform maintenance on the weapon system, but are not involved with the actual launch procedures. Most Air Force members who earned the Missile Badge with operations designator also earned the Combat Readiness Medal after two years of qualified service in an active missile launch control center. Missile operations (13N) is no longer a subset of the Space Operations career field (13S) and thus Missile Operators no longer are awarded a Space Badge. As of 1 October 2009, officers who have gone through the missile operations training are awarded their badge upon completion of the class.
