= GeoEye =

American commercial satellite imaging company

GeoEye Inc.
- Founded: 1992 Orbital Imaging Corporation; 2006 GeoEye
- Founder: Orbital Sciences Corporation
- Defunct: January 2013, merged with DigitalGlobe
- Headquarters: Herndon, Virginia, United States
- Key people: James Alan Abrahamson (chairman), Matthew O'Connell, (CEO)
- Revenue: US$183.76 million (2007)
- Operating income: US$80.33 million (2007)
- Net income: US$42.39 million (2007)
- Total assets: US$789.95 million (2007)
- Total equity: US$216.92 million (2007)
- Number of employees: 410 (2008)

GeoEye Inc. (formerly Orbital Imaging Corporation, or ORBIMAGE) was an American commercial satellite imagery company based in Herndon, Virginia. GeoEye was merged into the DigitalGlobe corporation on January 29, 2013.

The company was founded in 1992 as a division of Orbital Sciences Corporation in the wake of the 1992 Land Remote Sensing Policy Act which permitted private companies to enter the satellite imaging business. The division was spun off in 1997. It changed its name to GeoEye in 2006 after acquiring Denver, Colorado-based Space Imaging Corporation for $58 million. Space Imaging was founded and controlled by Raytheon and Lockheed Martin. Its principal asset was the IKONOS satellite; the company was founded in the 1990s for the purpose of managing the project that became the IKONOS satellite.

Although ORBIMAGE's first chairman was Orbital chairman David W. Thompson, and Orbital at the time owned more than 60 percent of the stock, it no longer has a substantial interest in the company or its successor.

GeoEye provided 253 million km^{2} (98 million mi^{2}) of satellite map images to Microsoft and Yahoo! search engines. In 2008 Google secured exclusive online mapping use of the GeoEye-1 satellite. GeoEye maintained major contracts with the National Geospatial-Intelligence Agency for the provision of reconnaissance and imagery data.

In the early twenty-first century GeoEye was headquartered in Herndon, Virginia. Satellite Operations were conducted from Herndon and Thornton, Colorado. The location in St. Louis, Missouri provided additional image processing. Multiple ground stations were located worldwide.

In 2011, GeoEye was inducted into the Space Foundation's Space Technology Hall of Fame for its role in advancing commercial Earth-imaging satellites.

GeoEye was purchased by DigitalGlobe in 2013.

== Satellites ==
=== OrbView 1 ===
OrbView 1 (MicroLab 1, COSPAR 1995-017C) was a small, 68 kg satellite built by Orbital Sciences Corporation for a collaboration between ORBIMAGE and NASA. It had a payload of 2 sensors, one from NASA and another from University Consortium for Atmospheric Research, sponsored by National Science Foundation. The collaboration had NASA provide the instruments and ORBIMAGE was in charge of operating them for research purposes for NASA and other academic instances. The sensors studied lightning in the atmosphere and the use of GPS signals in atmospheric studies (GPS radio occultation). It was launched 3 April 1995 from Vandenberg AFB by a Pegasus H rocket.

=== IKONOS ===
Launched in 1999 by Space Imaging, IKONOS collected 82 cm (32 in) panchromatic and 3.2 m (10 ft) multispectral data at a rate of over 2,000 km^{2} (770 sq mi) per minute. IKONOS orbited the Earth every 98 minutes at an altitude of approximately 681 km (423 mi). It traveled a Sun-synchronous orbit, passing a given longitude at 10:30 a.m. local time. IKONOS was operated out of Thornton, Colorado. It derived its name from the Greek term eikōn (pronounced eikona) for image. IKONOS was retired on March 31, 2015, having performed for more than twice its life expectancy.

=== OrbView-2 ===
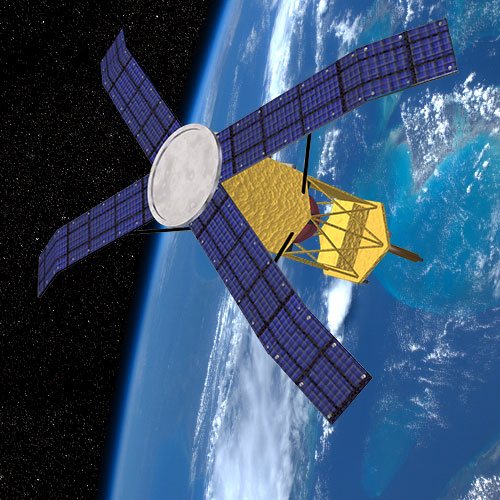
Artist's rendition of the OrbView-2 or SeaStar satellite in orbit

The OrbView-2 satellite (COSPAR 1997-037A), also called SeaStar, was launched 1 August 1997 by ORBIMAGE on a Pegasus XL rocket from Vandenberg AFB. OrbView-2 collected color imagery of the Earth's entire land and ocean surfaces on a daily basis. Commercial fishing vessels used OrbView-2 data for detecting oceanographic conditions used to create fishing maps. The satellite also provided broad-area coverage in 2,800-kilometer-wide (1,700 mi) swaths, which were routinely used in naval operations, environmental monitoring, and global crop assessment applications. OrbView-2 carried NASA's SeaWiFS (Sea-viewing Wide Field-of-view Sensor) sensor. OrbView-2 was operated out of Dulles, Virginia, but operations ceased shortly before GeoEye's HQ relocation to Herndon, Virginia in 2011. It stopped collecting data on 11 December 2010, after 13 years (design life was 5 years). It had a mass of 309 kg and was built by Orbital Sciences Corporation.

=== OrbView-3 ===
Launched 26 June 2003 by ORBIMAGE, OrbView-3 (COSPAR 2003-030A) commercial Earth observation satellite acquired 1 m (3.3 ft) panchromatic and 4 m (13 ft) multispectral imagery in an 8-kilometer-wide swath. The satellite collected up to 210,000 km^{2} (81,000 sq mi) of imagery each day. It revisited each location on Earth in less than three days with the ability to collect data up to 50 degrees off nadir. Similar to IKONOS, this satellite passed a given longitude at 10:30 a.m. local time.

The satellite was launched from Vandenberg AFB by a Pegasus XL rocket. The satellite had a mass of 304 kg and was built by Orbital Sciences Corporation for ORBIMAGE. It carried an OHRIS (OrbView High Resolution Imaging System) payload designed and built by Northrop Grumman. Similar sensor was in OrbView 4 satellite.

On April 23, 2007, GeoEye, Inc. filed a Form 8-K to announce that its OrbView-3 satellite is permanently out of service. Though GeoEye remained in control of the satellite, it no longer produced usable imagery (the imaging sensor failed 4 March 2007). The spacecraft decayed on March 13, 2011 via a controlled reentry into Pacific Ocean.

=== OrbView 4 ===
OrbView 4 was a high-resolution commercial Earth imaging satellite that was lost in launch failure. It would have recorded 1 m (3.3 ft) panchromatic and 4 m (13 ft) multispectral imagery in an 8-kilometer-wide swath, like OrbView-3, and it also would have provided 200 channel hyperspectral imagery. It was to revisit every location on Earth in less than 3 days. The main instrument OHRIS (OrbView High Resolution Imaging System) was built by Northrop Grumman. The satellite bus was built by Orbital Sciences Corporation. The mass of the satellite was 368 kg. It was lost in a launch failure. On 21 September 2001, a Taurus XL rocket failed during launch. When the second stage ignited at T+83 seconds, a nozzle gimbal actuator drive shaft seized for approximately 5 seconds causing loss of control. The vehicle recovered and continued to fly the mission profile, but failed to reach a stable orbit and reentered near Madagascar.

=== GeoEye-1 ===
GeoEye-1 (Former name OrbView 5) launched on September 6, 2008 at 11:50:57 a.m. PDT (1850:57 UTC). The satellite separated successfully from its Delta II launch vehicle at 12:49 p.m. PDT (1949 UTC), 58 minutes and 56 seconds after launch. The satellite provides 41-centimeter (16 in) panchromatic and 1.65-meter multispectral imagery in 15.2 km swaths. The spacecraft is intended for a Sun-synchronous orbit at an altitude of 681 km (423 mi) and an inclination of 98 degrees, with a 10:30 a.m. equator crossing time. GeoEye-1 can image up to 60 degrees off nadir. It is operated out of Herndon, Virginia and was built in Arizona by General Dynamics Advanced Information Systems.

=== GeoEye-2 ===
The GeoEye-2 satellite is designed to provide panchromatic images at a highest resolution of 0.31 meters per pixel (12.2 in/px), and multispectral images at 1.24 meters per pixel (48.8 in/px). The spacecraft was designed and built by Lockheed Martin, while the camera payload was provided by ITT Corporation.

Following the merger of GeoEye and DigitalGlobe, DigitalGlobe announced that GeoEye-2 would be completed as a ground spare to be launched if or when required. It was renamed to WorldView-4 in July 2014, when the company announced that it would be launched in 2016.

WorldView-4 launched on 11 November 2016.

== Aerial imagery ==
GeoEye expanded into aerial imagery in March 2007, with the purchase of MJ Harden from General Electric Company. MJ Harden, based in Mission, Kansas, is now a wholly owned subsidiary that operates two aircraft that carry a digital mapping camera (DMC) and a sophisticated LiDAR imaging system. MJ Harden was founded by Milton J. Harden in 1956 to provide photogrammetry services. GE Power Systems bought the company in 2003.

== Regional affiliates ==
- Space Imaging Middle East
