= Flight Officer Badge =

A Flight Officer Badge is a decoration used by some of the world's air forces, to include naval aviation of the world's navies, marine forces and coast guards, to denote those who have received training as co-pilots, navigators, observers, or other aircraft officer flight crew personnel. The primary difference between a flight officer and a pilot is that the pilot is responsible for the actual flying and control the aircraft, while the flight officer assists with such duties as navigation and weapons and/or sensor systems operation.

In some commercial airlines, Flight Officer Badges are issued to flight engineers of larger aircraft, such as the Boeing 747.

In the United States military, the Naval Flight Officer Badge is issued to officers of the Navy and Marine Corps. The Navigator Badge for officers and Aircrew Badge for enlisted personnel, variations of the Flight Officer Badge, are issued by the Air Force to its Combat Systems Officers and enlisted aircrewmen, respectively.

== See also ==
- Military badges of the United States
