= Badges of the United States Space Force =

Military badges of the U.S. Space Force

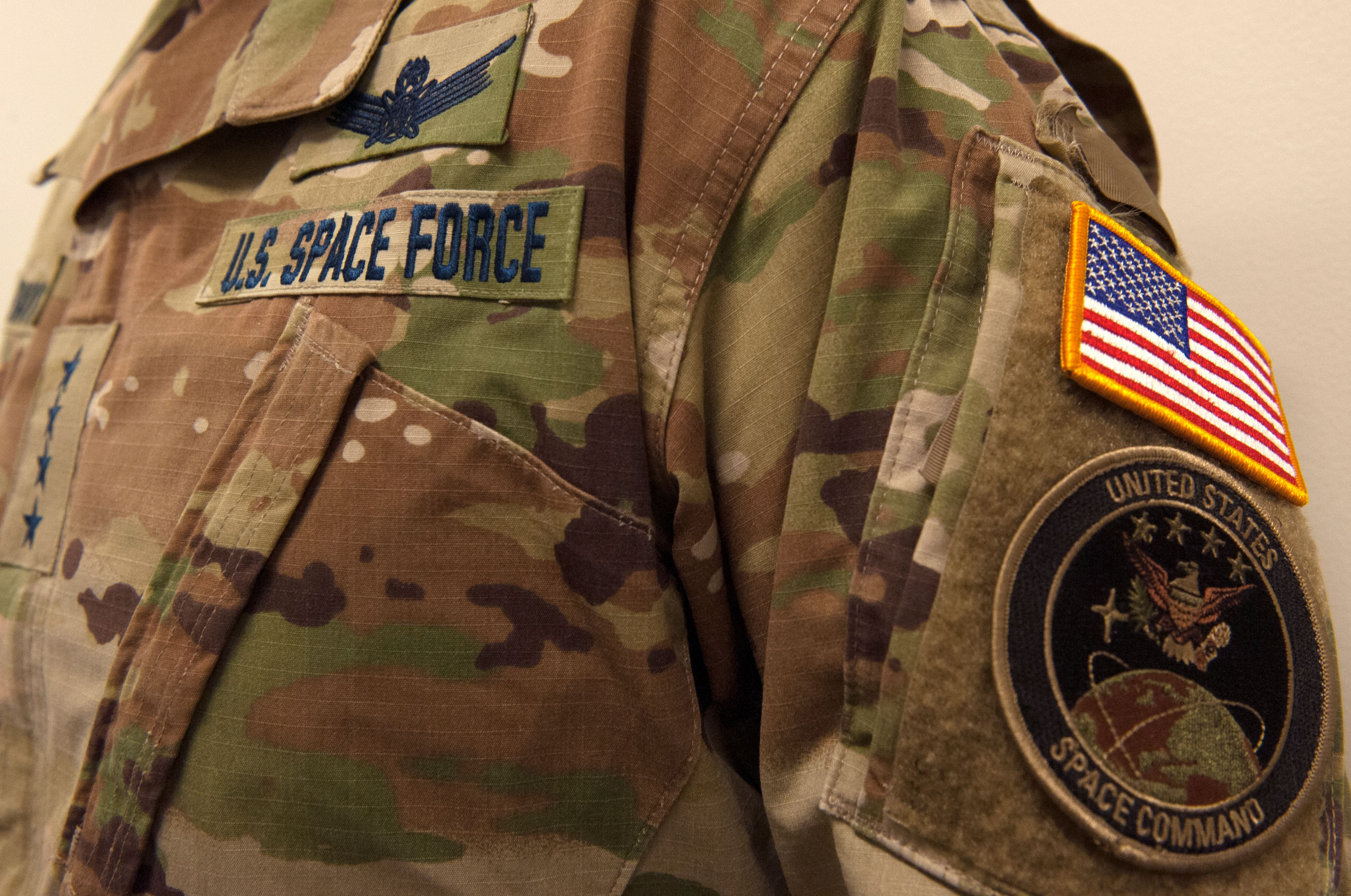
Then-chief of space operations General John W. Raymond's Operational Camouflage Pattern uniform, displaying the Space Operations Badge (command-level; above the "U.S. SPACE FORCE" nametape) and United States Space Command patch (on arm, below the U.S. flag).

Badges of the United States Space Force (USSF) are specific uniform paraphernalia authorized by the USSF that signify ratings, special skills, career field qualifications, and may serve as identification devices for personnel occupying certain assignments. USSF occupational badges are awarded in three degrees or skill levels. Badges for space operations are awarded at "basic", "senior", and "command" levels; other occupational badges are issued in "basic", "senior", and "master" levels. A star and wreath system, worn above the badge, denotes which degree or skill level a service member currently holds.

As with the United States Air Force (USAF), USSF personnel are authorized to wear most badges issued by other branches of the armed services.

== Overview ==
Current USSF occupational badges are shared with the USAF and come in the grades of "basic", "senior", and "master" or "command". USSF occupation badges are worn on the left side of the uniform in metal for the service and mess dress uniforms or embroidered in space blue on the Operational Camouflage Pattern (OCP) uniform. All occupational and skill badges are optional for wear. If sister service badges are worn, they are required to be embroidered in space blue "if available", otherwise they may be embroidered in the issuing service's "current color configuration". Foreign badges are authorized for wear if approved by the USSF service member's FLDCOM commander or equivalent.

=== Space Operations Badge ===
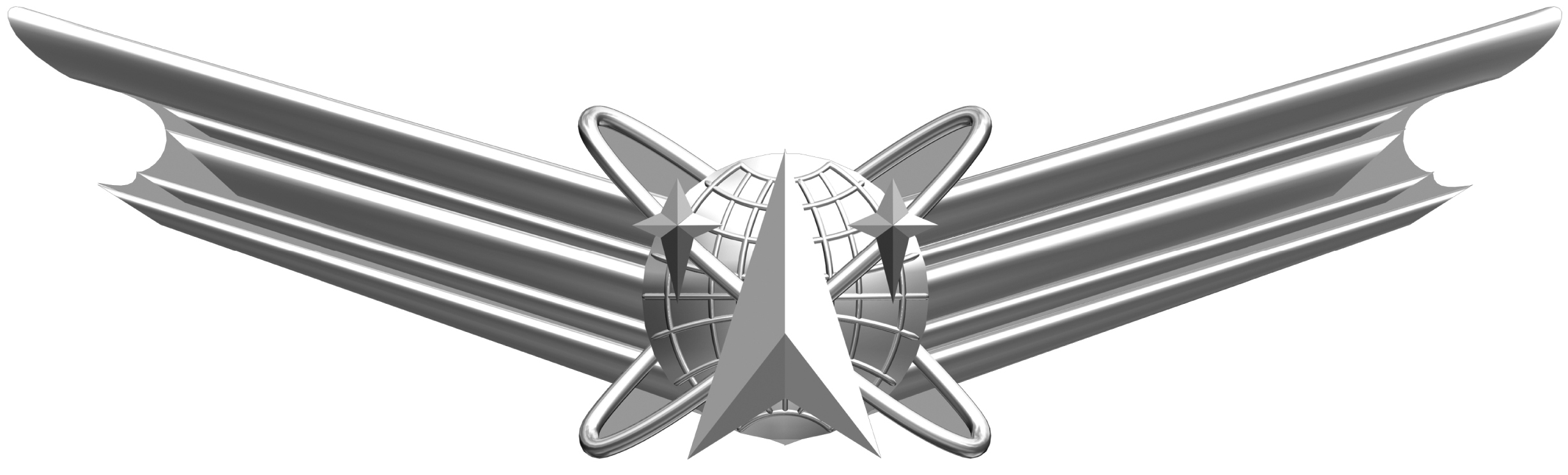
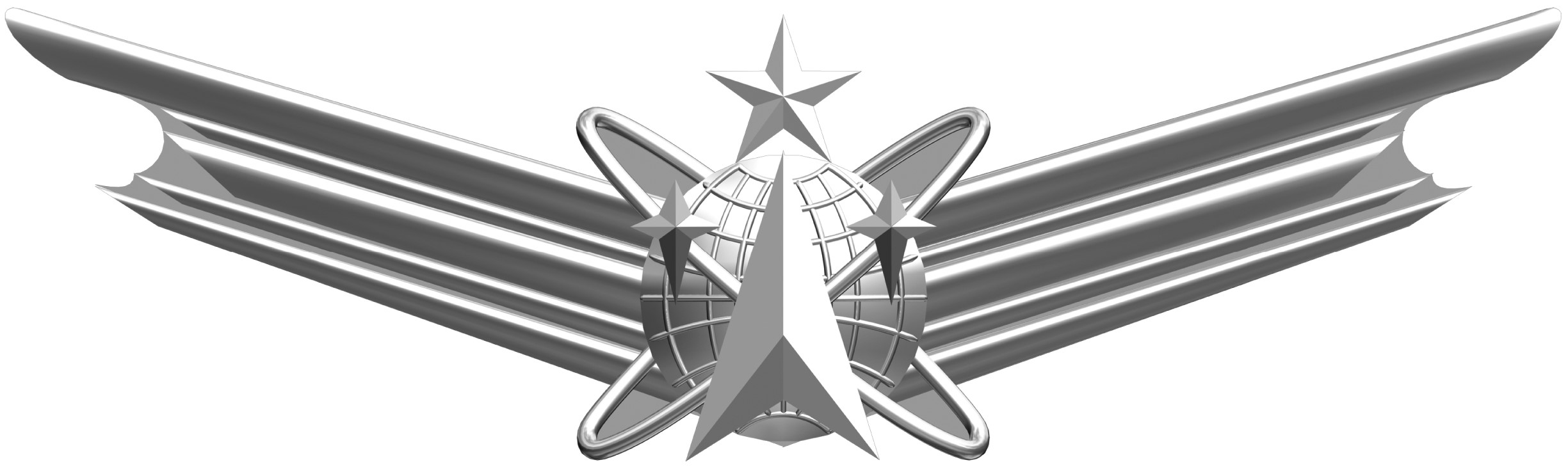
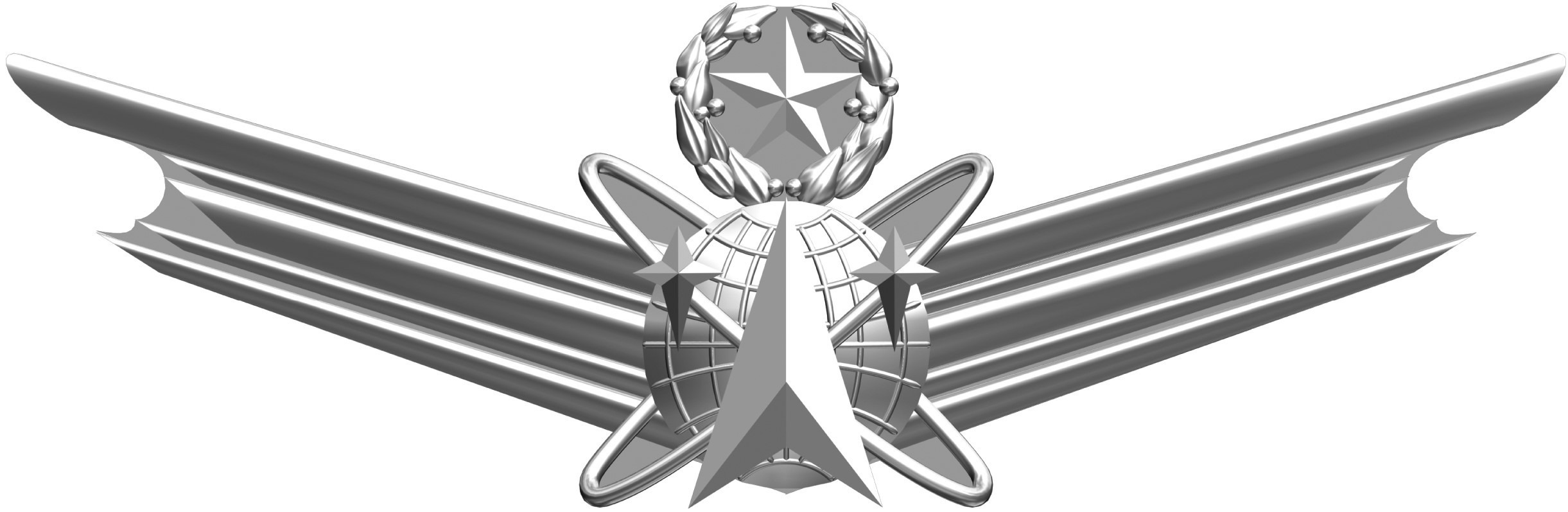

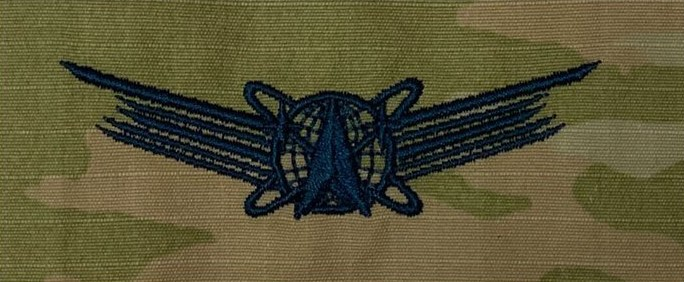
Basic Space Operations Badge

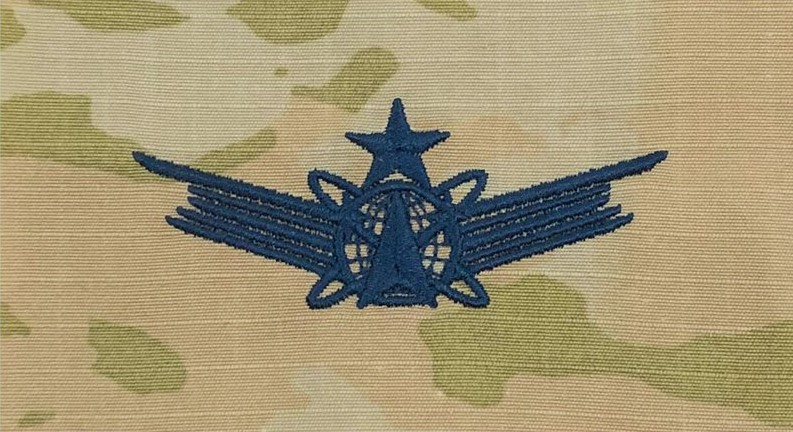
Senior Space Operations Badge

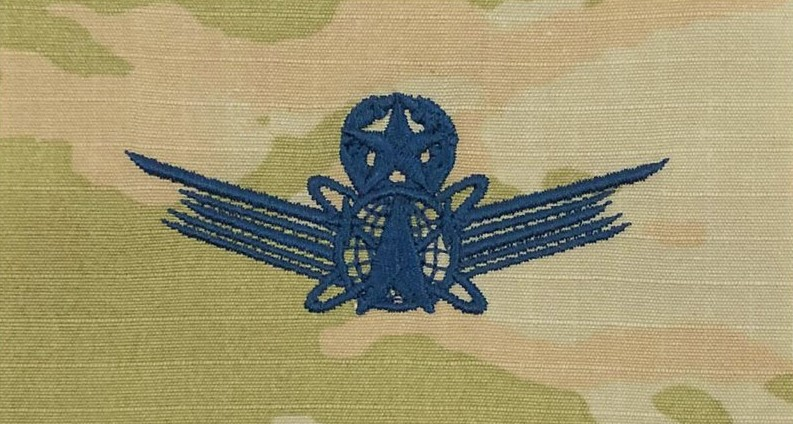
Command Space Operations Badge

The Space Operations Badge is awarded to 13S space operations officers and 5S0 space systems specialists. It is awarded in the grades of basic, senior, and command. The first space badge was authorized on 4 November 1982 and issued to 20XX space operations officers, before renamed the Space and Missile Badge on 22 October 1993 in recognition of the merging of the 18XX missile operations officer and 20XX space operations officer career fields into the 13S space operations officer career field. The section space badge, known as the Space Operations Badge, replaced the first space badge on 1 November 2005 and was initially known as the Space Badge. On 1 January 2004, it was renamed the Space Operations Badge.

Official heraldry of the Space Operations Badge: "The central globe represents the Earth as viewed from space, the Earth being the origin and control point for man’s space endeavors. The global lines of latitude and longitude hearken to the original 20th Air Force patch and emphasize the global nature of the Air Force space mission. The thrusts and vectors behind the globe represent the dynamic and infinite space environment. The deltoid symbolizes the Air Force’s upward thrust into space, the reentry vehicles of our intercontinental ballistic missile force and the launch vehicles that place satellites in orbit. The ellipses represent orbital paths traced by satellites in Earth orbit; the satellites symbolically depicted as four-pointed stars. The symmetric placement of the satellites signifies the Air Force’s worldwide coverage in accomplishing its mission."

=== Intelligence Badge ===
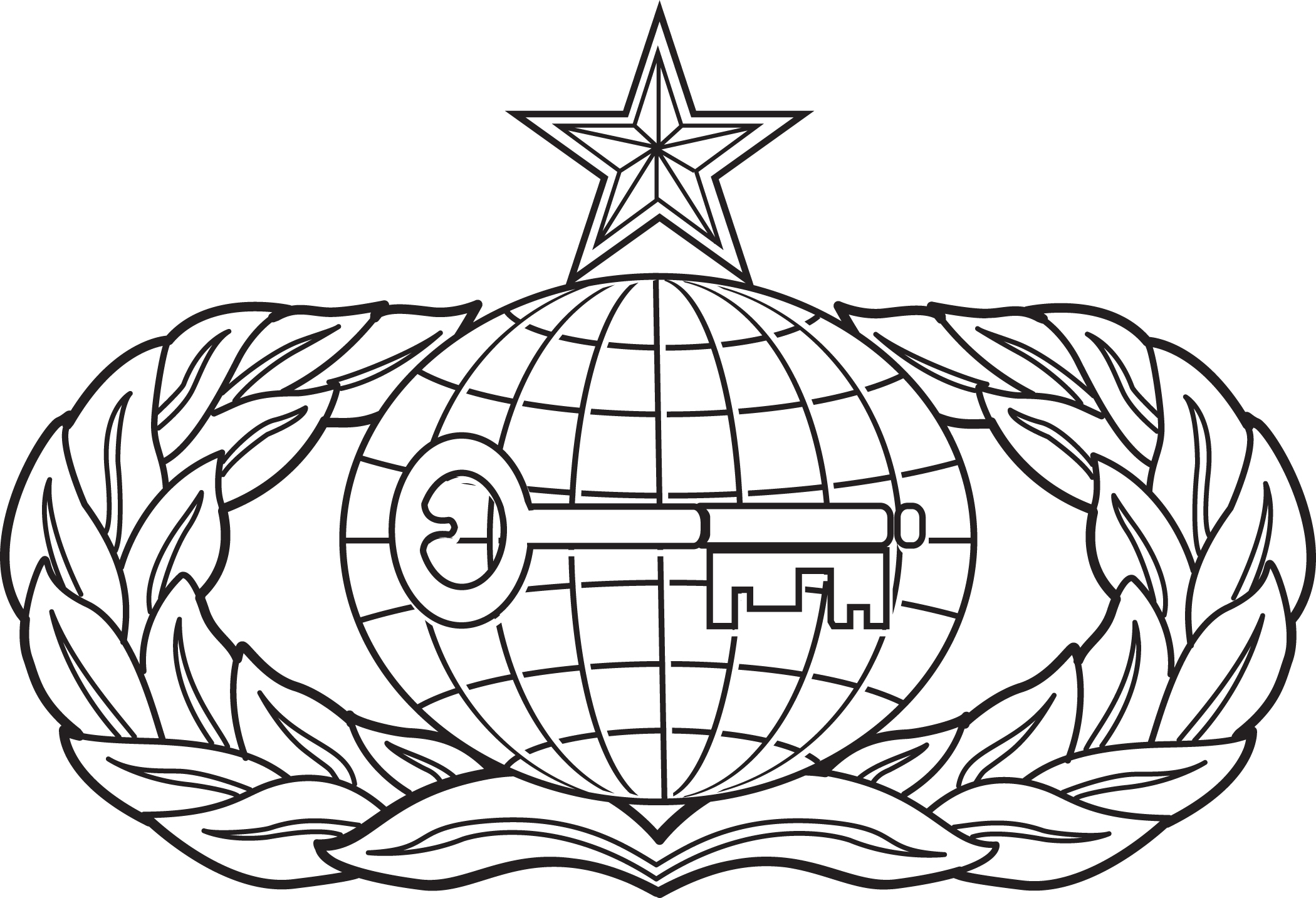
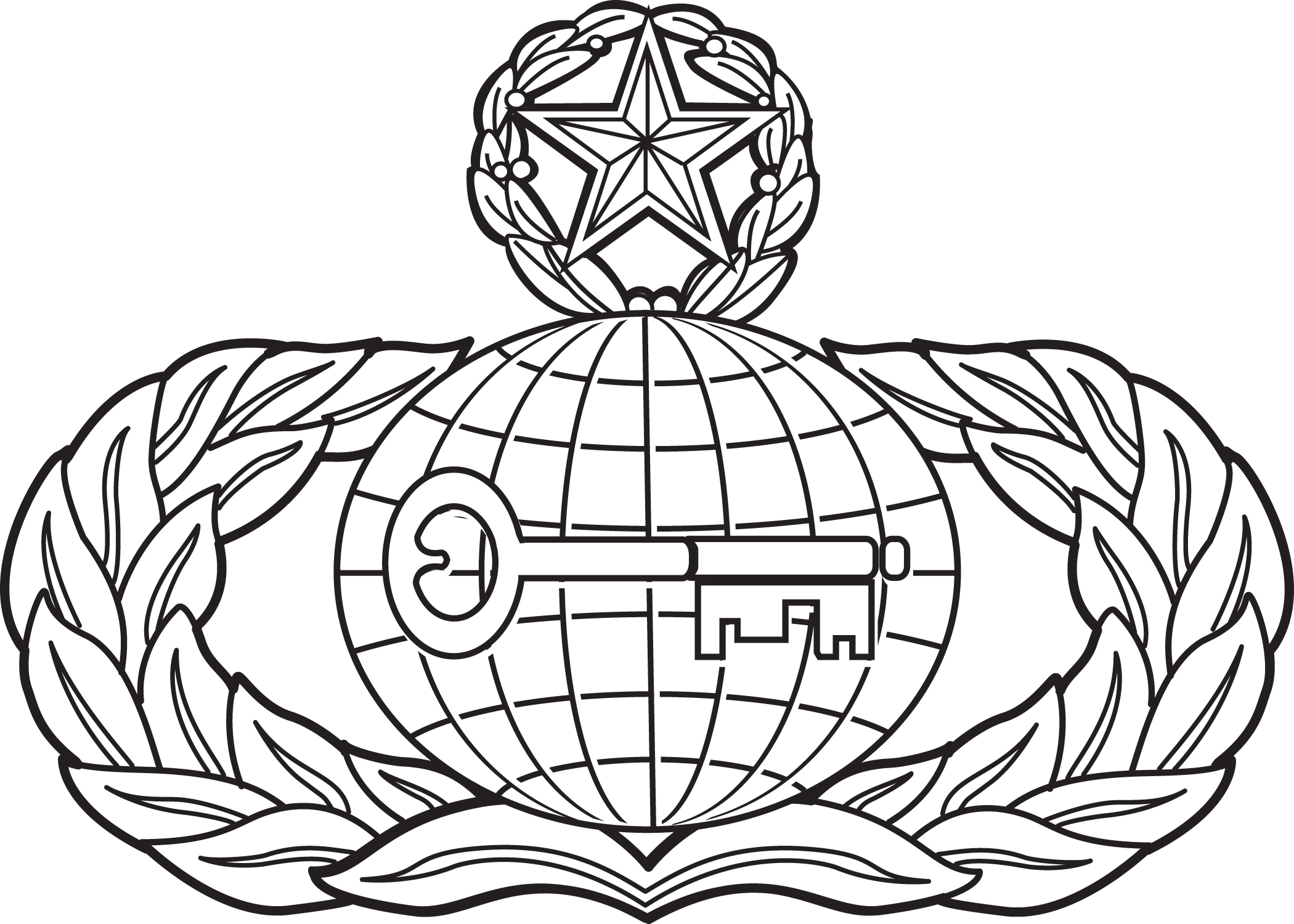

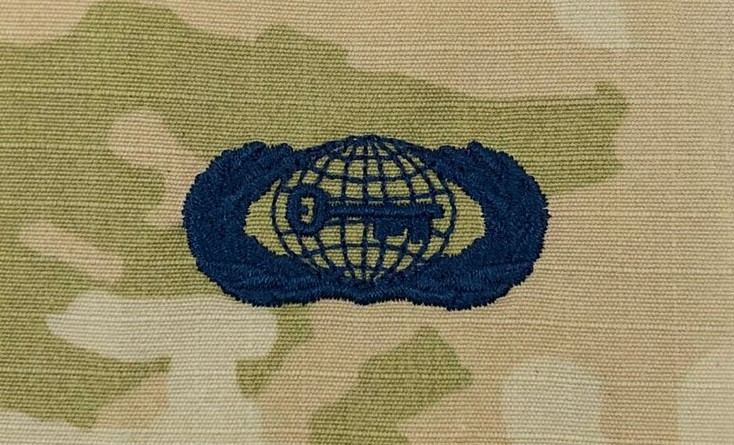
Basic Intelligence Badge

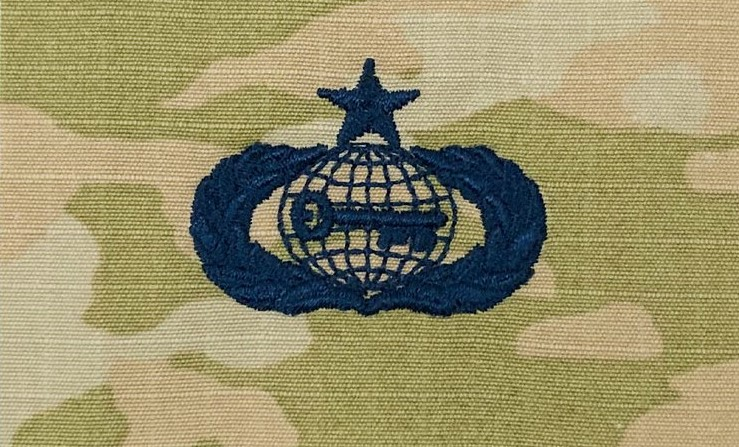
Senior Intelligence Badge

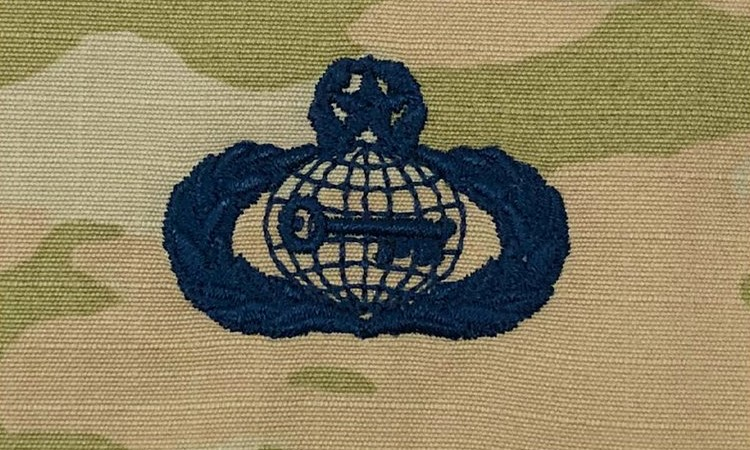
Master Intelligence Badge

The Intelligence Badge is awarded to 14N intelligence officers and 1N0 all source intelligence analysts, 1N1 geospatial intelligence analysts, 1N2 signals intelligence analysts, 1N4 fusion analysts, and 1N8 targeting analysts. It is awarded in the grades of basic, senior, and command.

=== Cyberspace Operator Badge ===
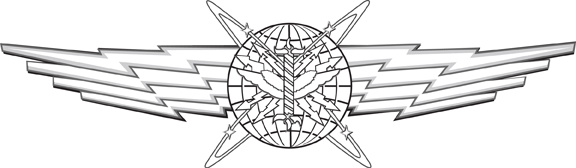
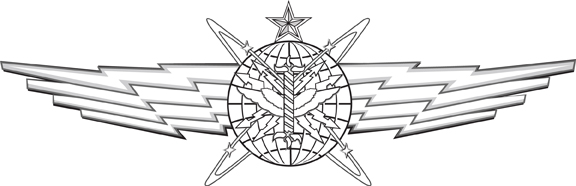
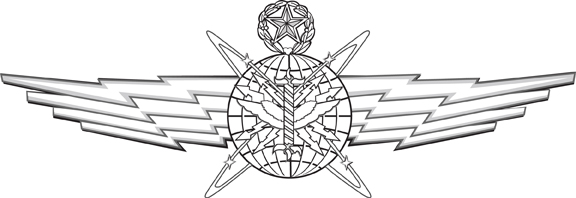

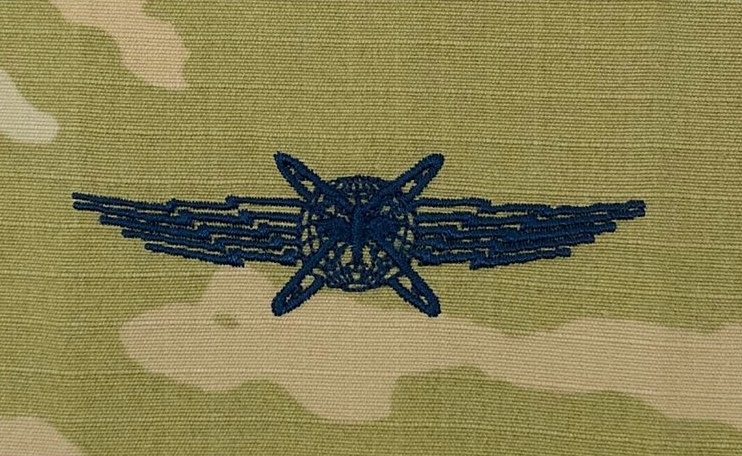
Basic Cyberspace Operator Badge

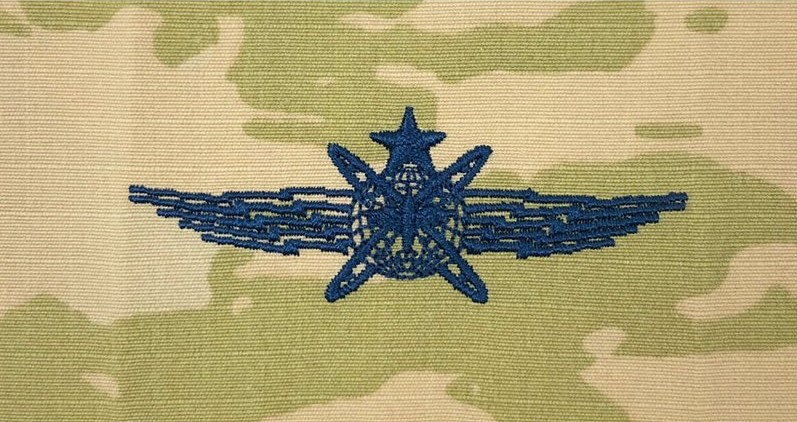
Senior Cyberspace Operator Badge

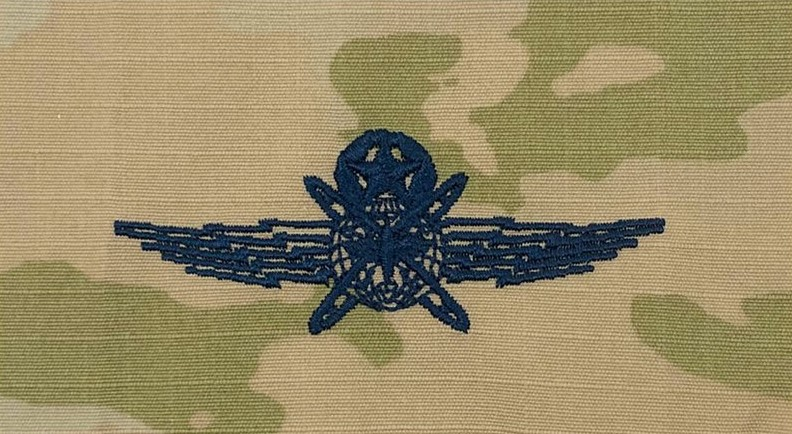
Master Cyberspace Operator Badge

The Cyberspace Operator Badge is awarded to 17C cyberspace warfare operations commanders, 17D warfighter communications operations officers, and 17S cyberspace effects operations officers. It is awarded in the grades of basic, senior, and master, replacing the previous Communications and Information Badge on 21 April 2010.

The lightning bolt wings signify the cyberspace domain while the globe signifies the projection of cyber power world-wide. The globe, combined with lightning bolt wings, signifies the Air Force's common communications heritage. The bolted wings, centered on the globe, are a design element from the Department of the Air Force Seal signifying the striking power through air, space and cyberspace. The orbits signify the space dimension of the cyberspace domain.

=== Cyberspace Support Badge ===
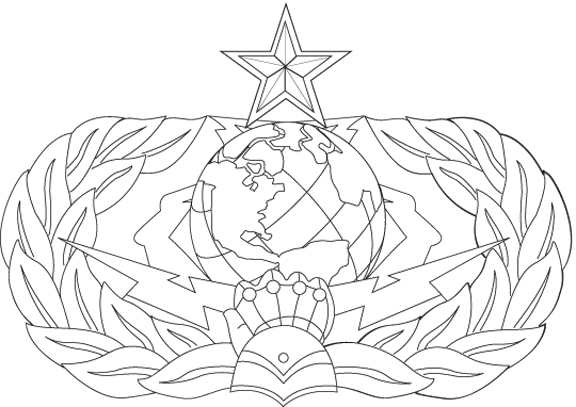
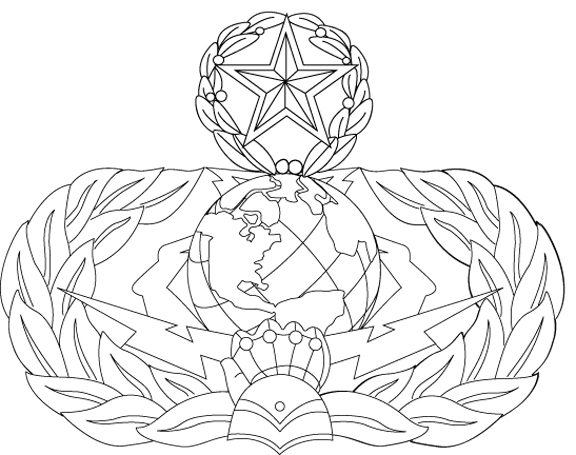

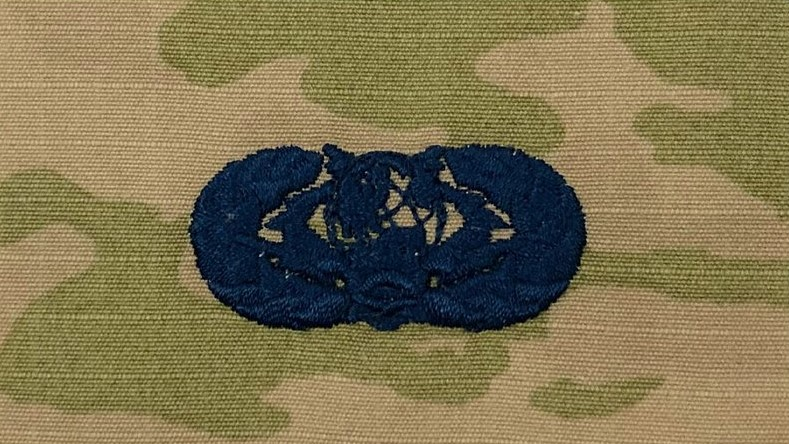
Basic Cyberspace Support Badge

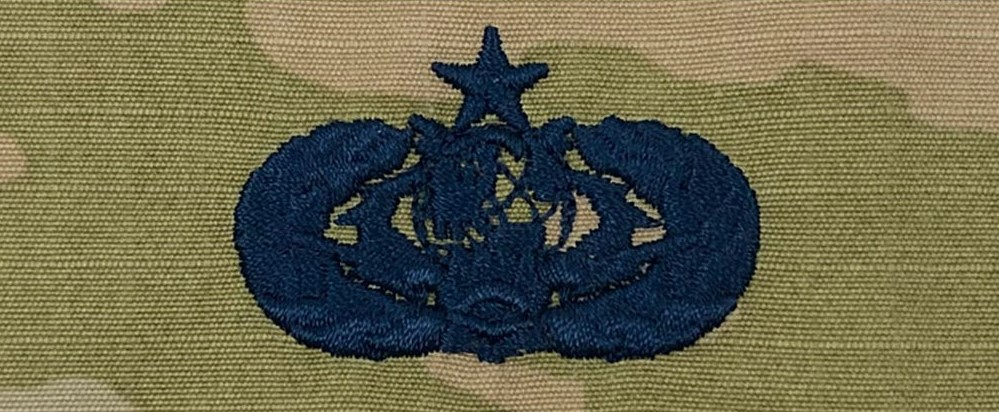
Senior Cyberspace Support Badge

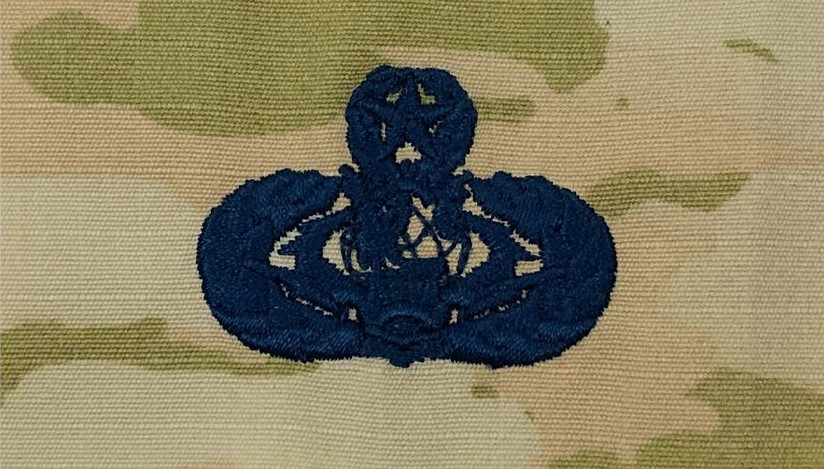
Master Cyberspace Support Badge

The Cyberspace Support Badge is awarded to 3D0 cyberspace operations specialists and 3D1 cyberspace support specialists. It is awarded in the grades of basic, senior, and master, replacing the previous Communications and Information Badge on 1 June 2010.

=== Acquisition and Financial Management Badge ===
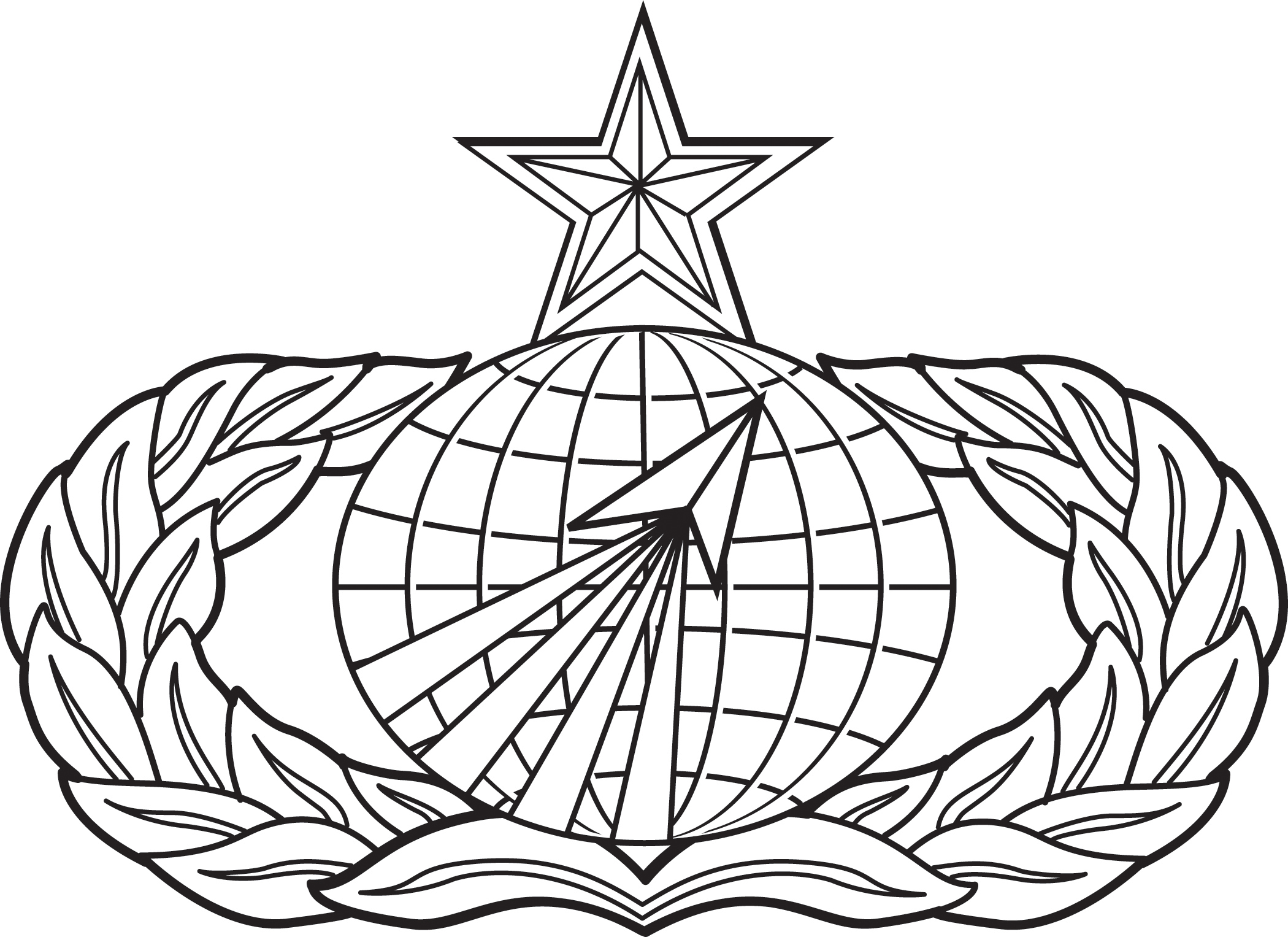
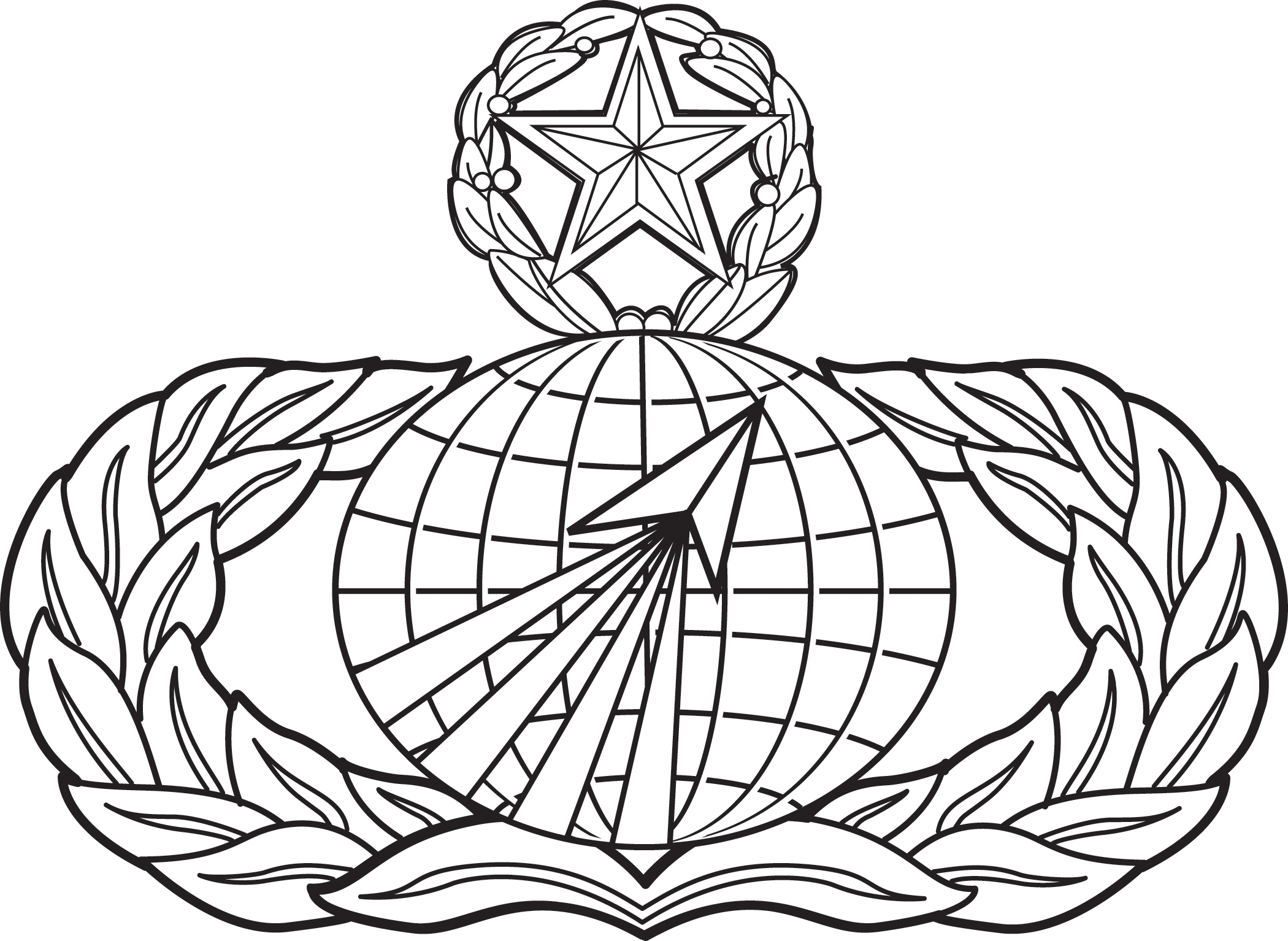

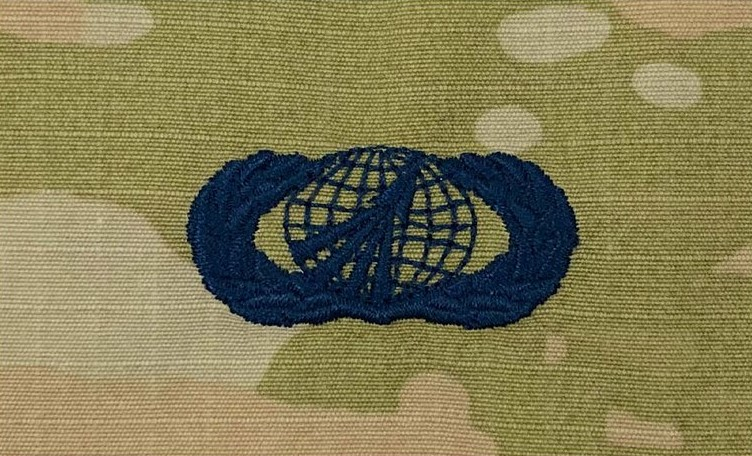
Basic Acquisition and Financial Management Badge

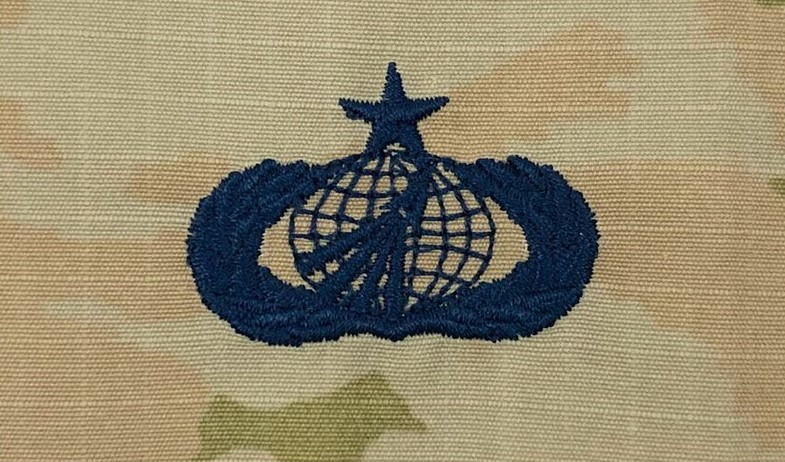
Senior Acquisition and Financial Management Badge

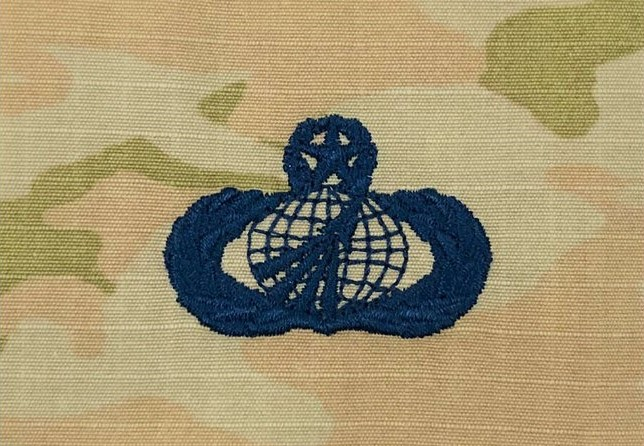
Master Acquisition and Financial Management Badge

The Acquisition and Financial Management Badge was established in 1993. It is awarded to United States Space Force (USSF) 62E developmental engineers, 62S Materiel Leaders, 63A acquisitions managers, 63S Materiel Leaders, 63G Senior Materiel Leaders-Lower Echelon, and 60C Senior Materiel Leader-Upper Echelon. It is awarded in the grades of basic, senior, and command. The badge is also awarded to United States Air Force (USAF) 62E developmental engineers, 62S Materiel Leaders, 63A acquisitions managers, 63S Materiel Leaders, 63G Senior Materiel Leaders-Lower Echelon, 60C Senior Materiel Leader-Upper Echelon, 64P Contracting Officers, 65F Financial Managers, and 65W Cost Analysts. From 1993 through 2021, the badge was awarded to USAF 61C Chemists and 61D Physicists. (USAF Chemists and Physicists often provide support for the USSF. In 2021, the Scientific Applications Specialist Badge was approved for USAF Chemists and Physicists, including those supporting the USSF.)

The center piece of the Acquisition and Financial Management badge is the depiction of the globe. This depiction represents acquisition's contribution to the Department of the Air Force's vision: "global power and reach for America." The converging paths reflect the inputs from the major acquisition elements (science & technology, development & test, production, and support). These inputs come together and result in advance weapon systems (represented by the deltoid) which support both Services in the Department of the Air Force, the USAF and the USSF.

Authorization and wear criteria for the Acquisition and Financial Management Badge applies to all military Force Modernization officers, USAF Airmen and USSF Guardians alike. That wear criteria are contained within the Force Modernization Talent Management Framework.

=== Interim Officer Training Course Badge ===
On August 28, 2025, the badge was reused as the United States Space Force interim Space Force Officer Training Course (OTC) graduation badge when the first ever Guardian Officer Training Course class completed their training at Peterson Space Force Base. It was announced at that time that a permanent design for the badge would be announced in the future. Chief of Space Operations Gen. B. Chance Saltzman said, "We had a career field that was abandoned by the Air Force called multi-domain warfare officer. And I said, ‘Well, we’re training space and cyber. How is this not a multi-domain warfare officer?” The Space Force had announced on August 5, 2025 that they were moving away from the U.S. Air Force Space Operations Badge and that the first OTC class would not be awarded that badge, but a badge that would represent the completion of OTC.

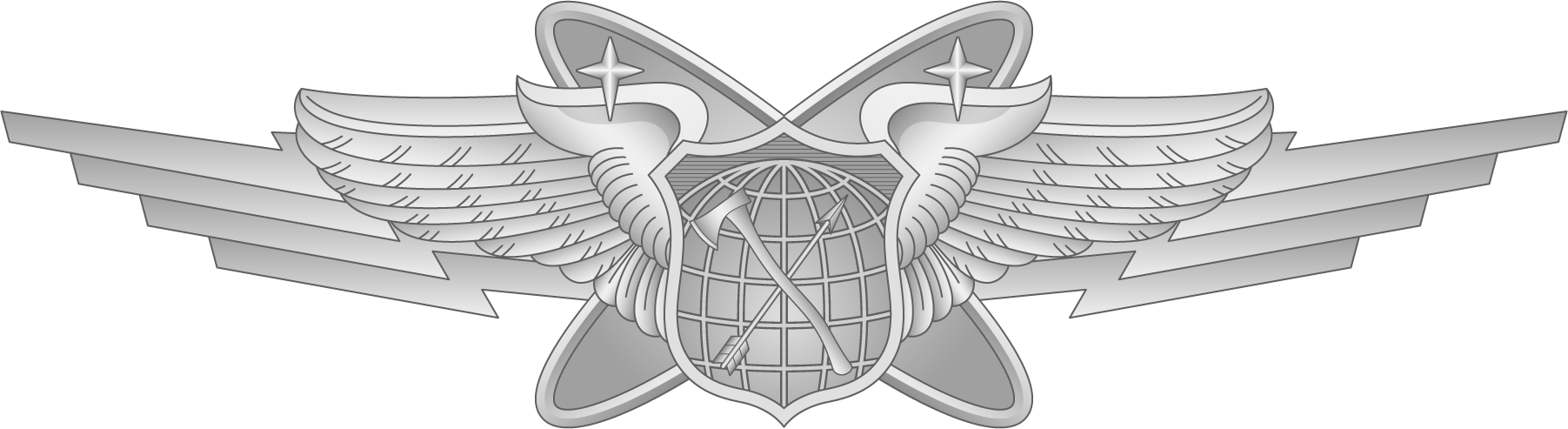
USAF Multi-Domain Warfare Officer Basic

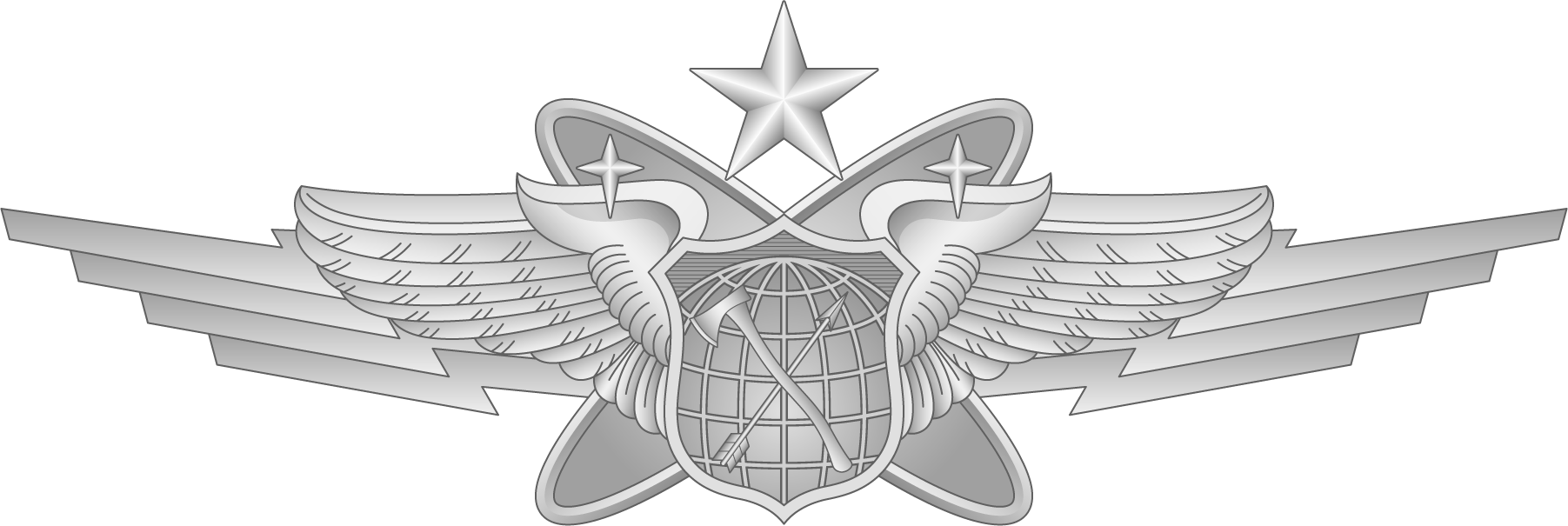
USAF Multi-Domain Warfare Officer Senior

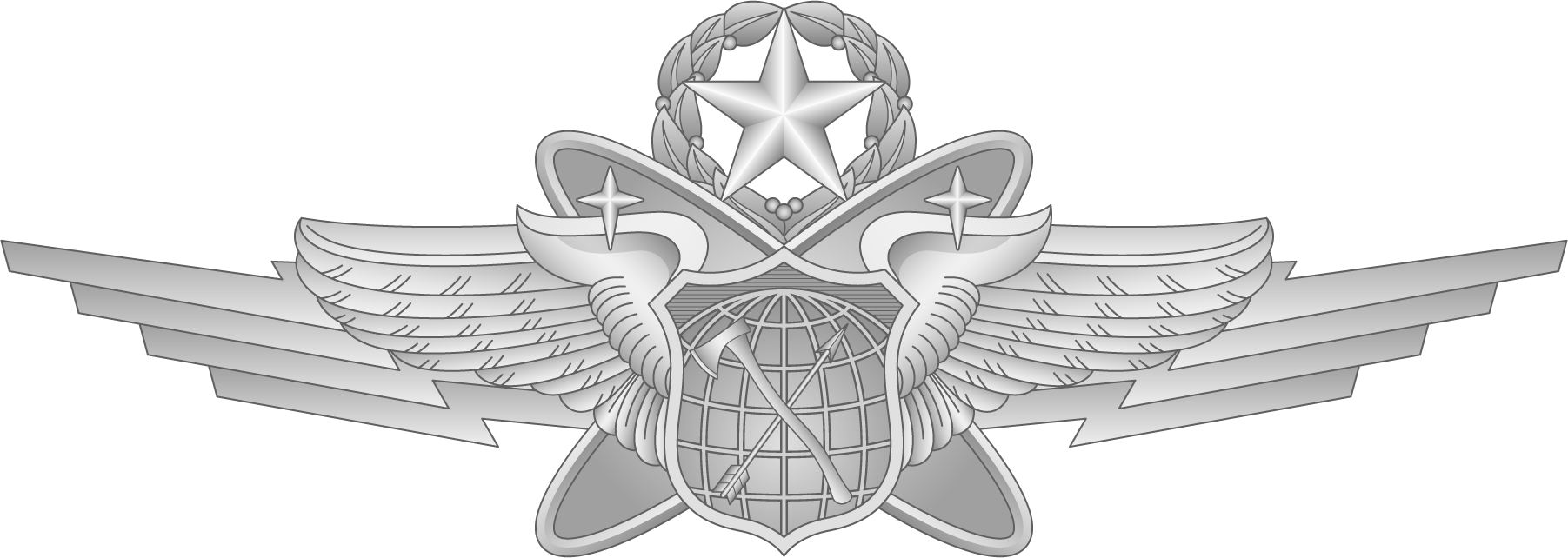
USAF Multi-Domain Warfare Officer Master

== Duty badges ==
=== U.S. Space Force lapel insignia ===
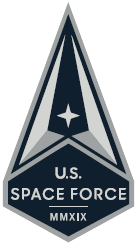
Space Force lapel insignia

=== Space Staff Badge ===
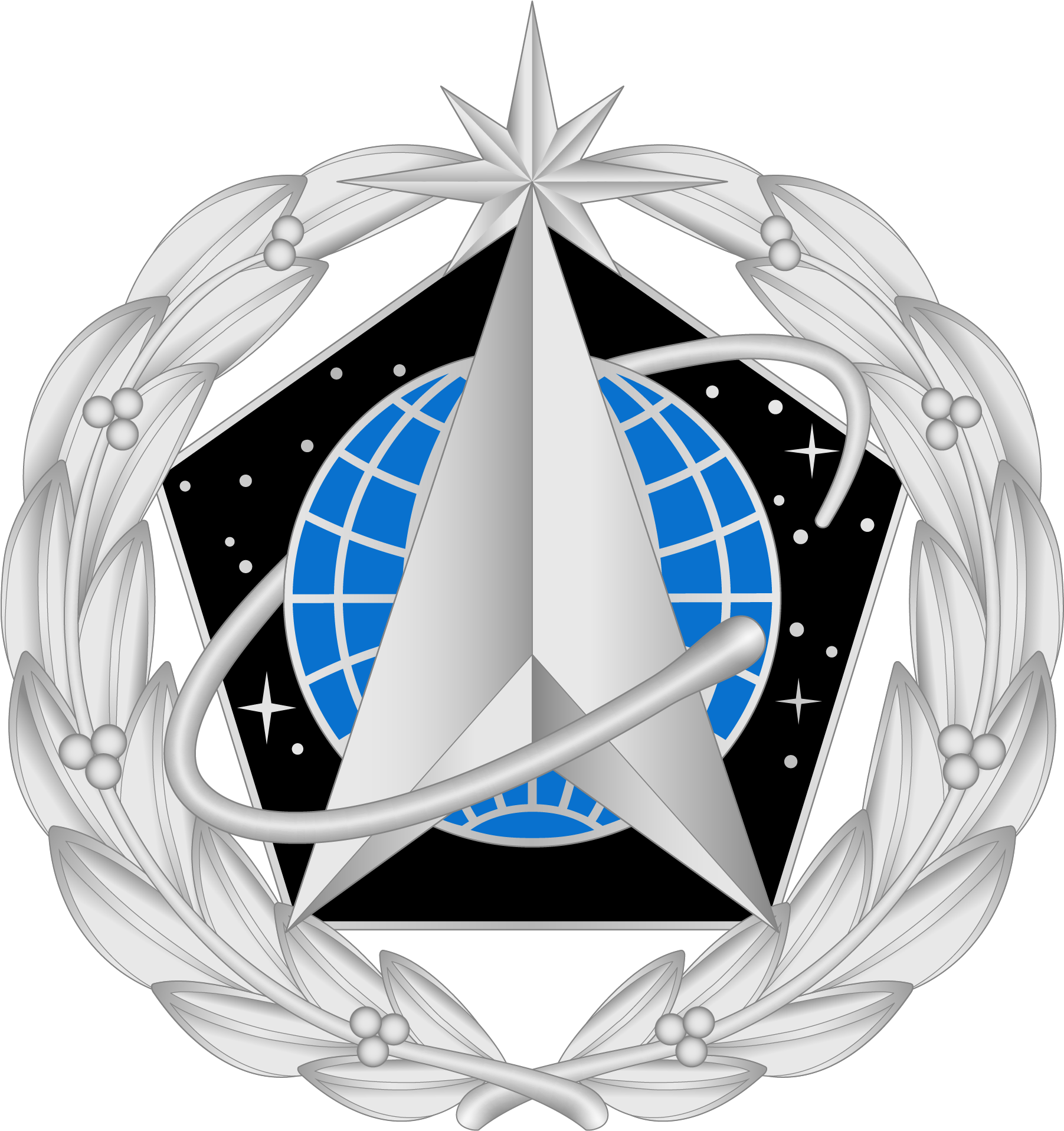
Space Staff Badge

=== Commander's Insignia ===
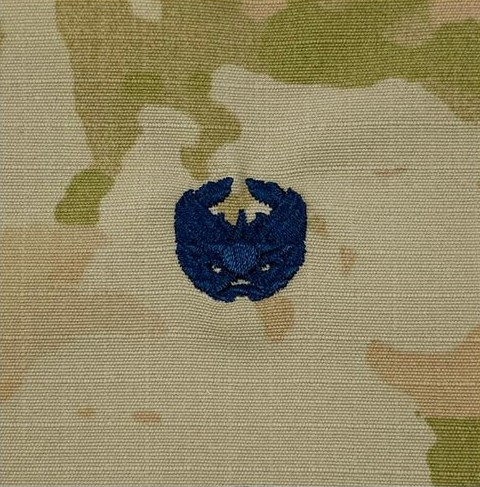
Commander's Insignia

The Air Force Commander's Insignia is worn by officers in the grade of colonel and below who are currently in command above the name tag on the right side of the uniform. Graduated commanders wear the commander's insignia beneath the nametag on the service uniform or the Velcro patch on the top of the right sleeve in the OCP uniform.

Guardians do not wear the Air Force Materiel Leader's Insignia. Space Force Materiel Leaders and Senior Materiel Leaders generally do not wear the Air Force Commander's Insignia. The Space Force has no equivalent for the Air Force Materiel Leader's Insignia.

=== Mission Tabs ===
Space Force Mission Tabs
First Sergeant	Cyberspace Warfare	Electromagnetic Warfare	Missile Warning and Tracking	Navigation Warfare	Orbital Warfare
Range Control	Satellite Communications	Satellite Control	Space-Based Sensing and Targeting	Space Lift	Theater Electromagnetic Warfare

Space Force Mission Tabs are worn above the organizational unit patch on the OCP uniform.

== Graduate Patches ==
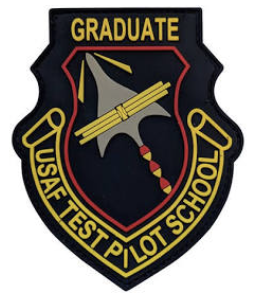
Test Pilot School Graduate Patch

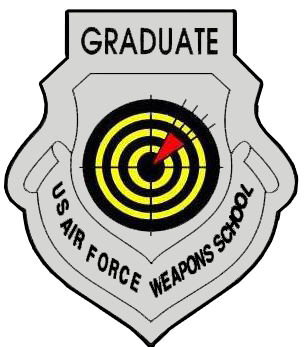
Weapons School Graduate Patch

School of Advanced Air and Space Studies Graduate Patch

== See also ==
- Military badges of the United States
- Identification badges of the United States military
- Uniforms of the United States Space Force
