= Badges of the United States Army =

Military decorations issued by the United States Department of the Army

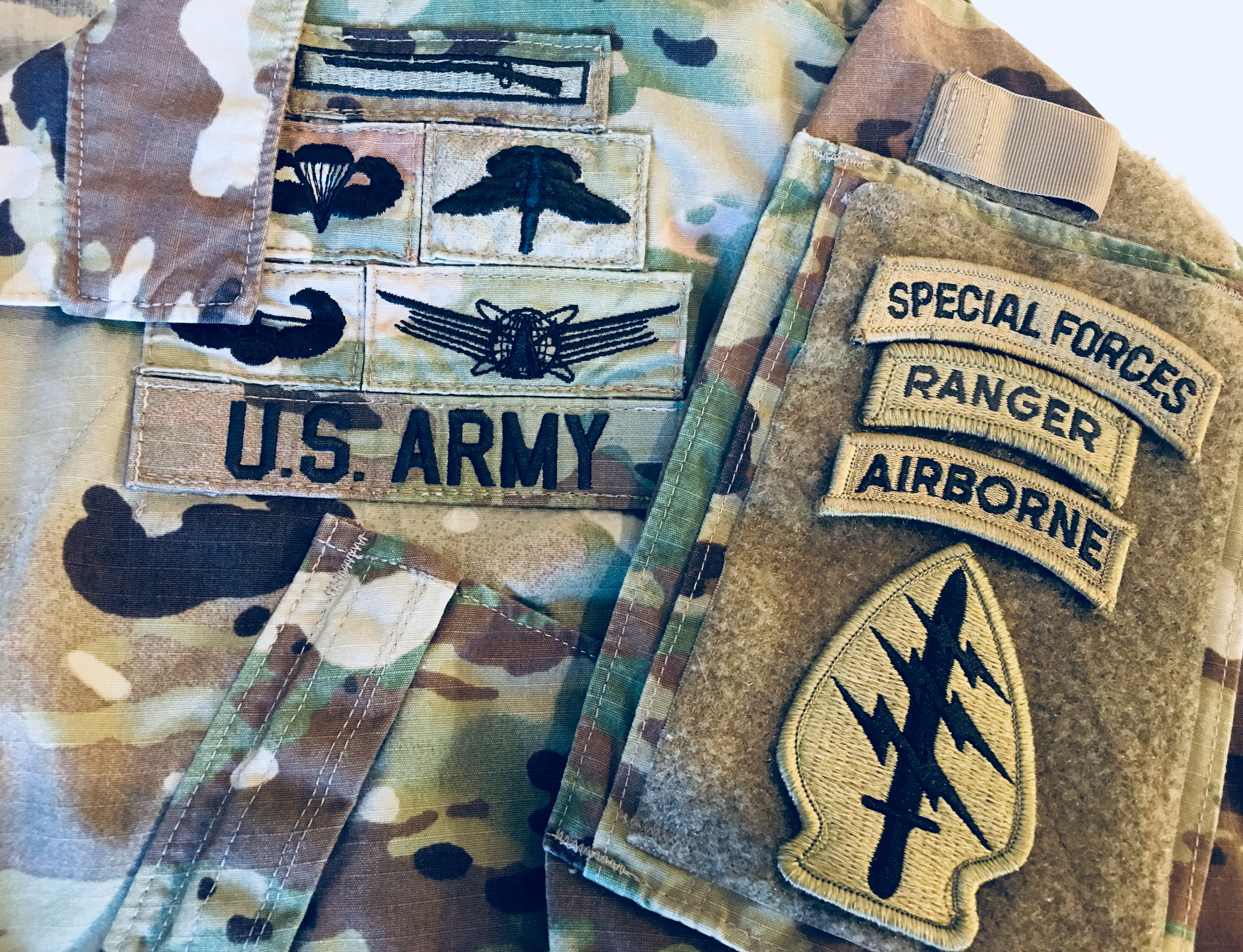
Example of badges and tabs worn on the U.S. Army Operational Camouflage Pattern (OCP) uniform

Badges of the United States Army are military decorations issued by the United States Department of the Army to soldiers who achieve a variety of qualifications and accomplishments while serving on active and reserve duty in the United States Army.

As described in Army Regulation 670-1 Uniforms and Insignia, badges are categorized into marksmanship, combat and special skill, identification, and foreign. Combat and Special Skill badges are further divided into six groups.

A total of six combat and special skill badges are authorized for wear at one time on service and dress uniforms; this total does not include special skill tabs (service uniform) or special skill tab metal replicas (dress uniform).

Personnel may wear up to three badges above the ribbons or pocket flap on dress uniforms, or in a similar location for uniforms without pockets. Personnel may only wear one combat or special skill badge from either group 1 or group 2 above the ribbons. Soldiers may wear up to three badges from groups 3 and 4 above the ribbons. One badge from either group 1 or group 2 may be worn with badges from groups 3 and 4 above the ribbons, so long as the total number of badges above the ribbons does not exceed three.

Only three badges (from groups 3, 4, or 5) can be worn on the dress uniform pocket flap at one time. This total does not include special skill tab metal replicas. Personnel will wear the driver and mechanic badges only on the wearer's left pocket flap of service and dress uniforms, or in a similar location on uniforms without pockets. Personnel may not attach more than three clasps to the driver and mechanic badges. The driver and mechanic badges are not authorized for wear on utility uniforms.

The order of precedence for combat and special skill badges are established only by group. There is no precedence for combat or special skill badges within the same group. For example, personnel who are authorized to wear the Parachutist and Air Assault badges may determine the order of wear between those two badges.

The 21st century United States Army issues the following military badges (listed below in order of group precedence) which are worn in conjunction with badges of rank and branch insignia.

== Combat and Special Skill Badges and Tabs ==
=== Group 1 ===
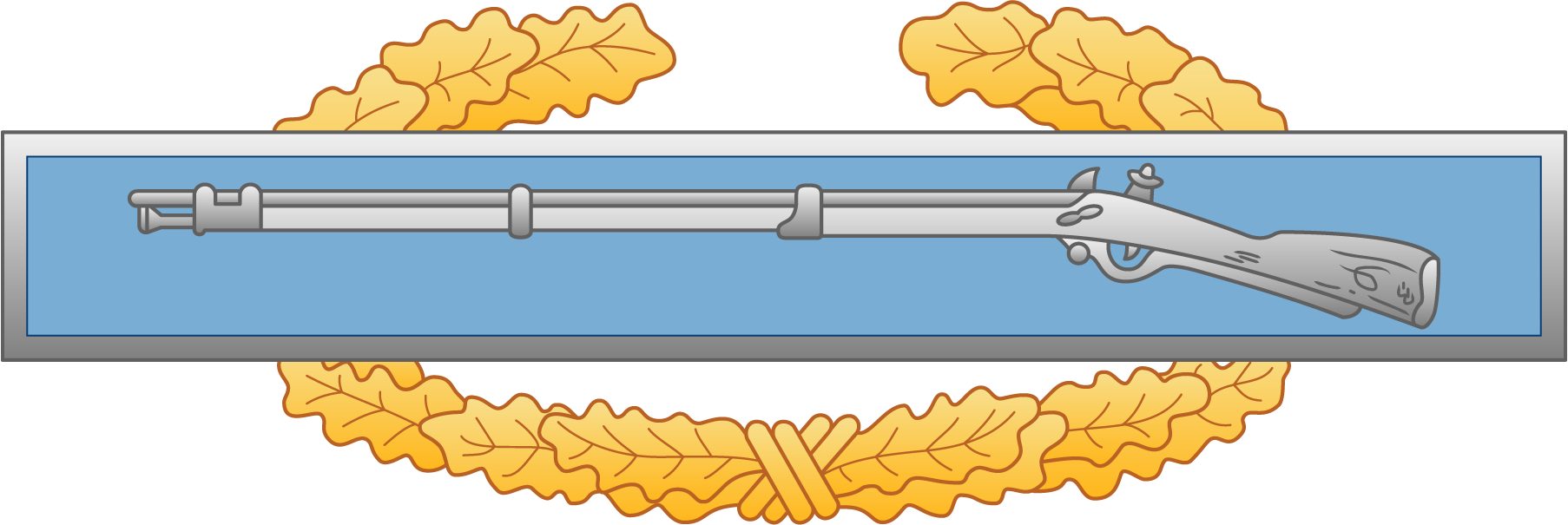
Master Combat Infantryman Badge

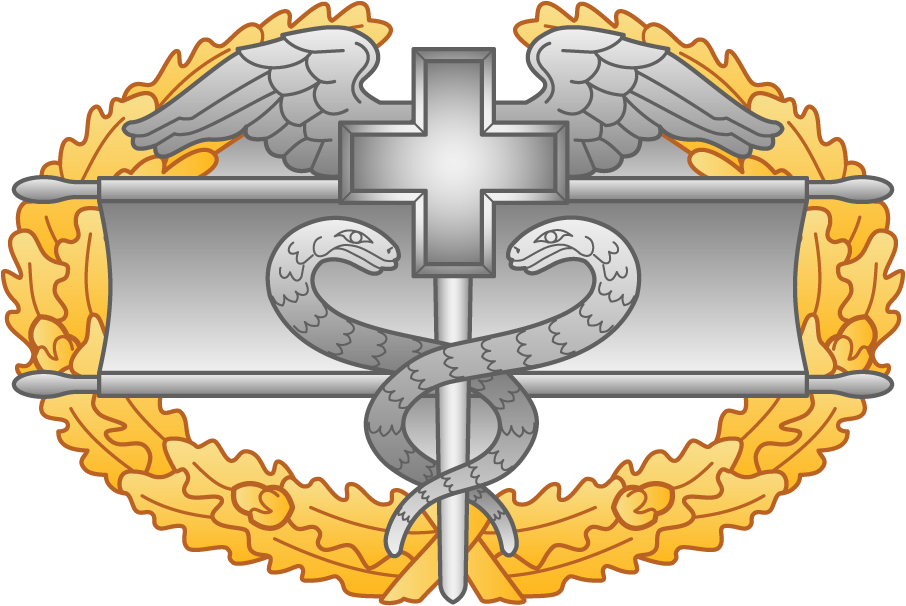
Master Combat Medical Badge

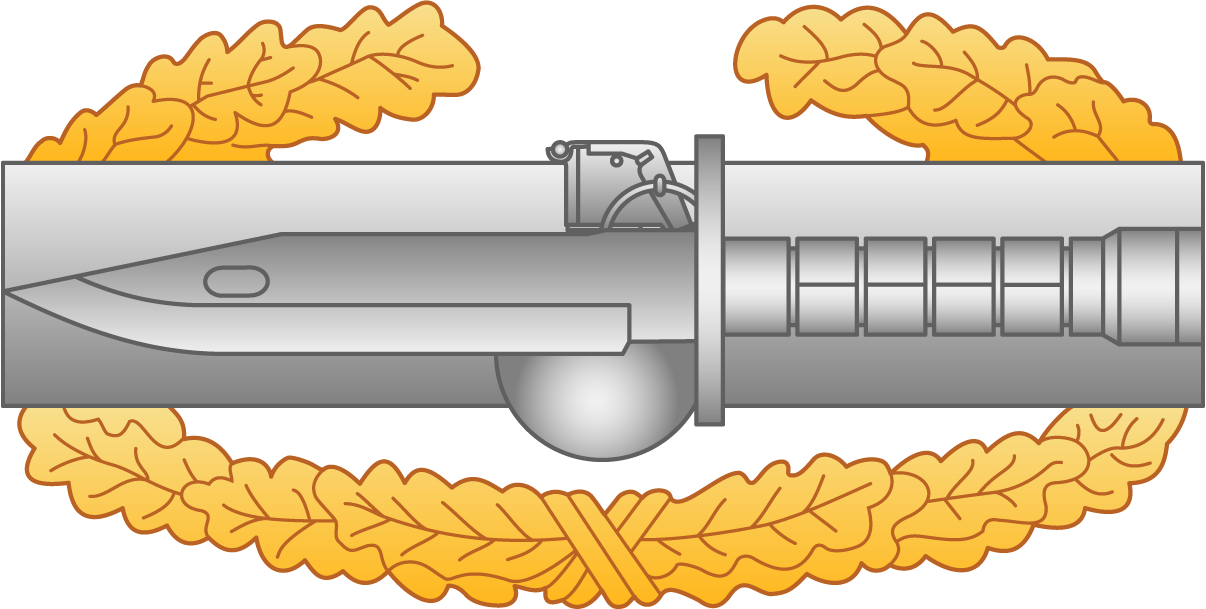
Master Combat Action Badge

Combat Infantryman Badge

Combat Medical Badge

Combat Action Badge

=== Group 2 ===
Expert Infantryman Badge

Expert Field Medical Badge

Expert Soldier Badge

=== Group 3 ===
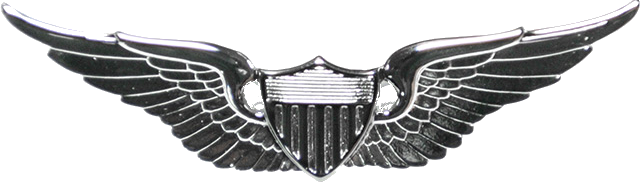
Army Aviator Badge

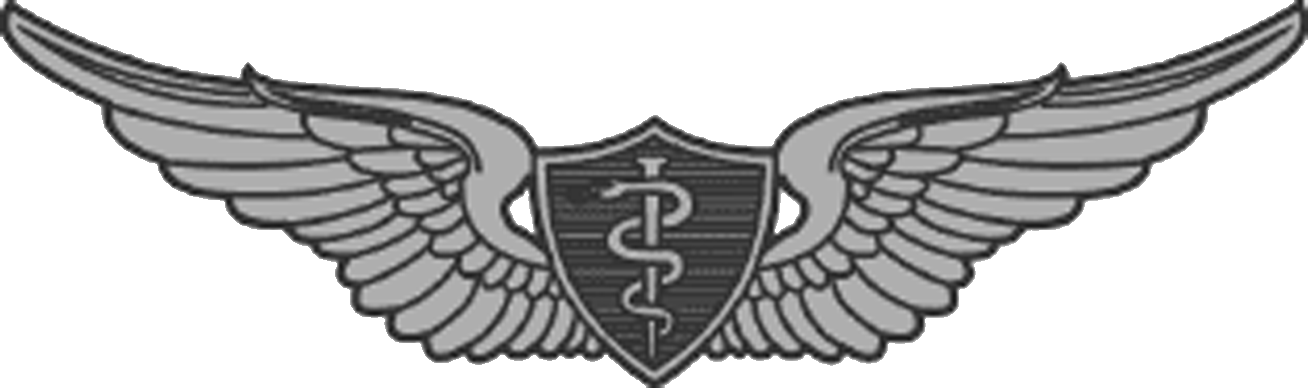
Army Flight Surgeon Badge

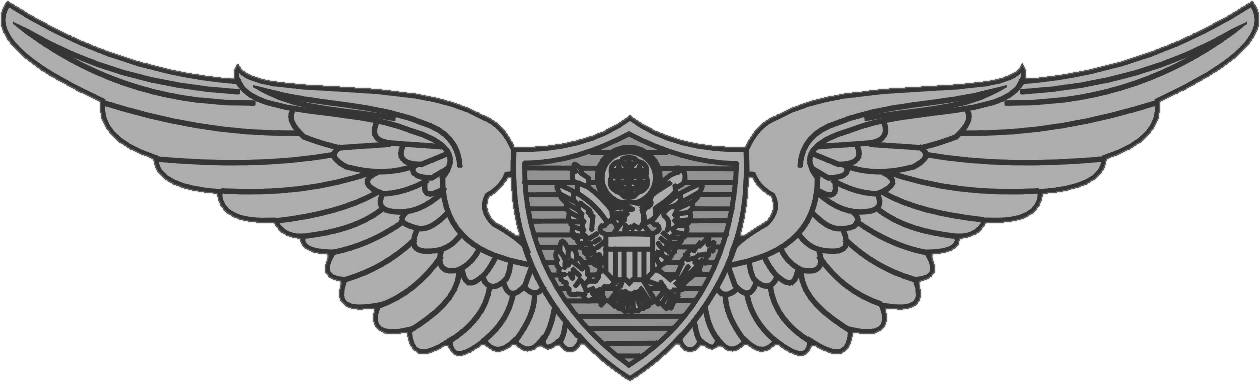
Army Aviation Badge

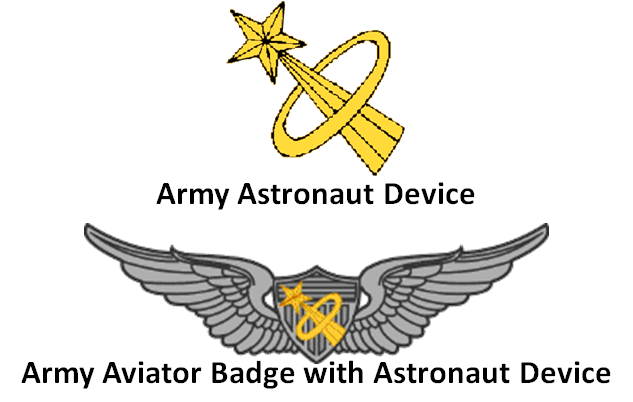
Army Astronaut Badges (Any Army Aviator, Flight Surgeon, or Aviation Badge with Astronaut Device)

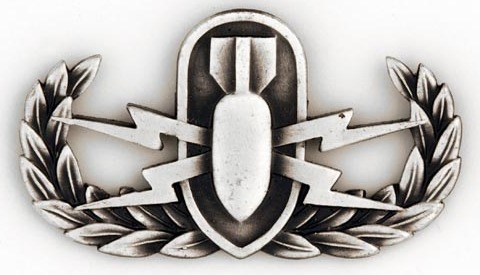
Explosive Ordnance Disposal Badge*

Parachute Rigger Badge*

=== Group 4 ===
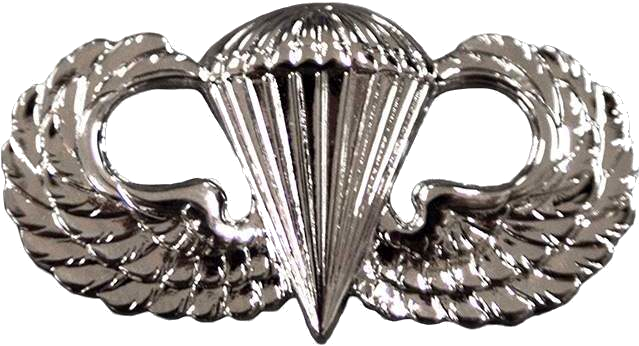
Parachutist Badge*

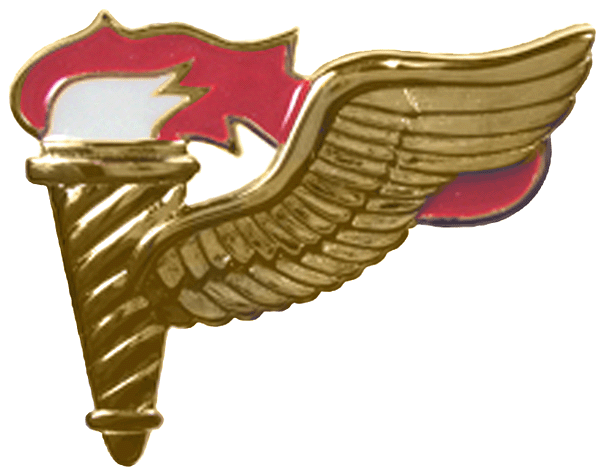
Pathfinder Badge

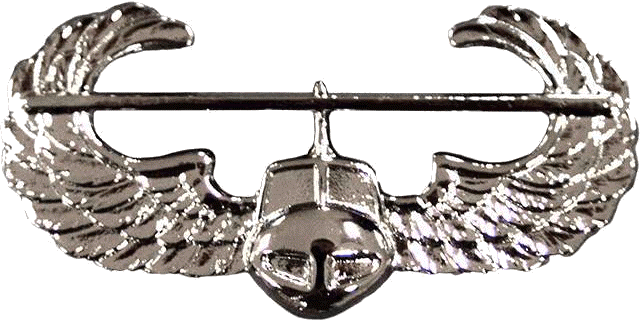
Air Assault Badge

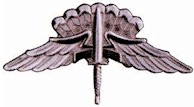
Military Freefall Parachutist Badge*

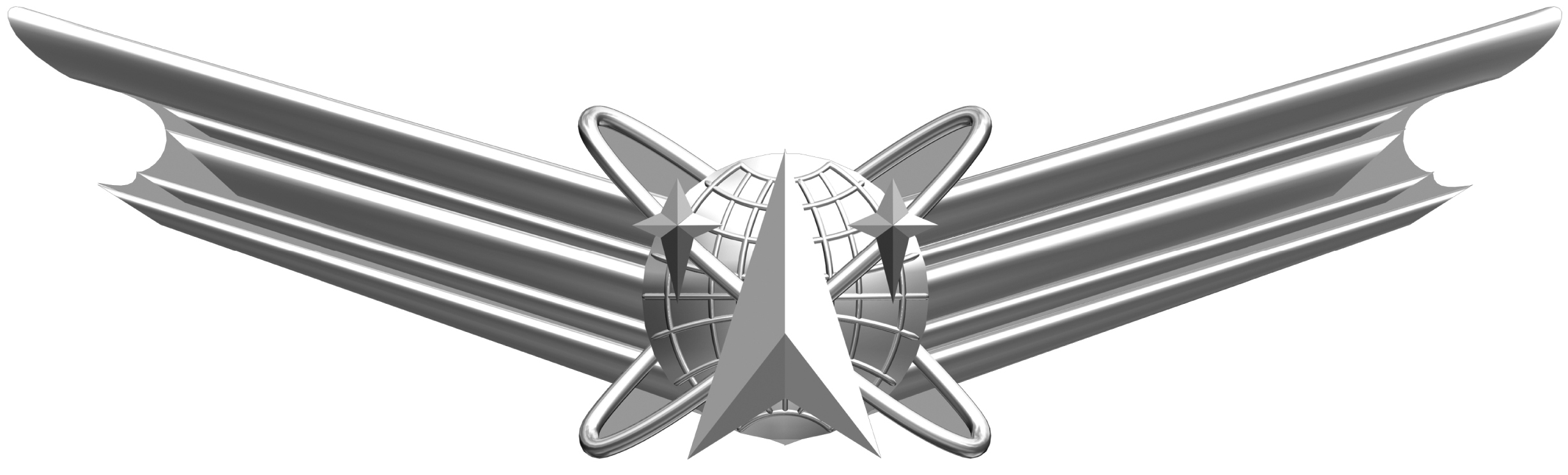
Space Badge**

(Non-special operations) Diver badges (SCUBA, salvage diver, etc.)

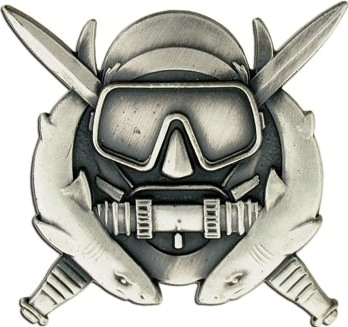
Special Operations Diver Badge

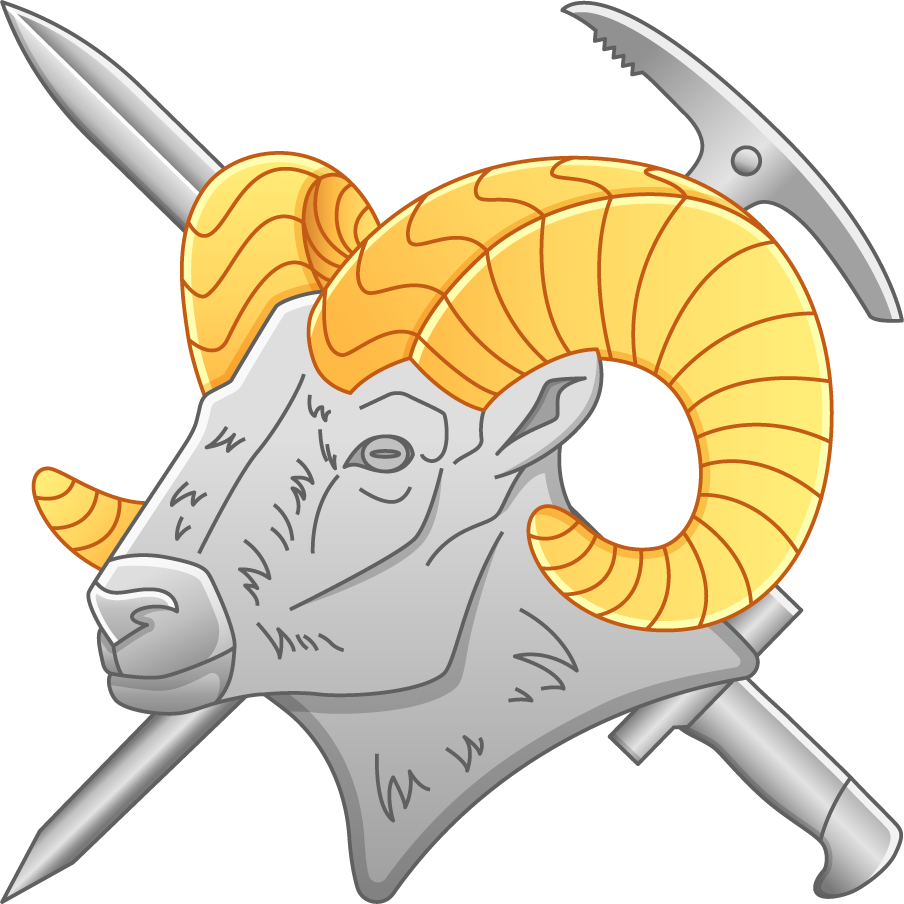
Mountaineering Badge

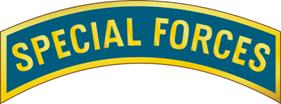
Special Forces Tab

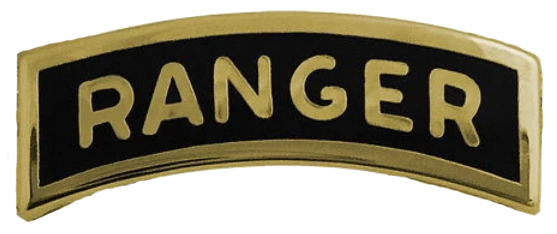
Ranger Tab

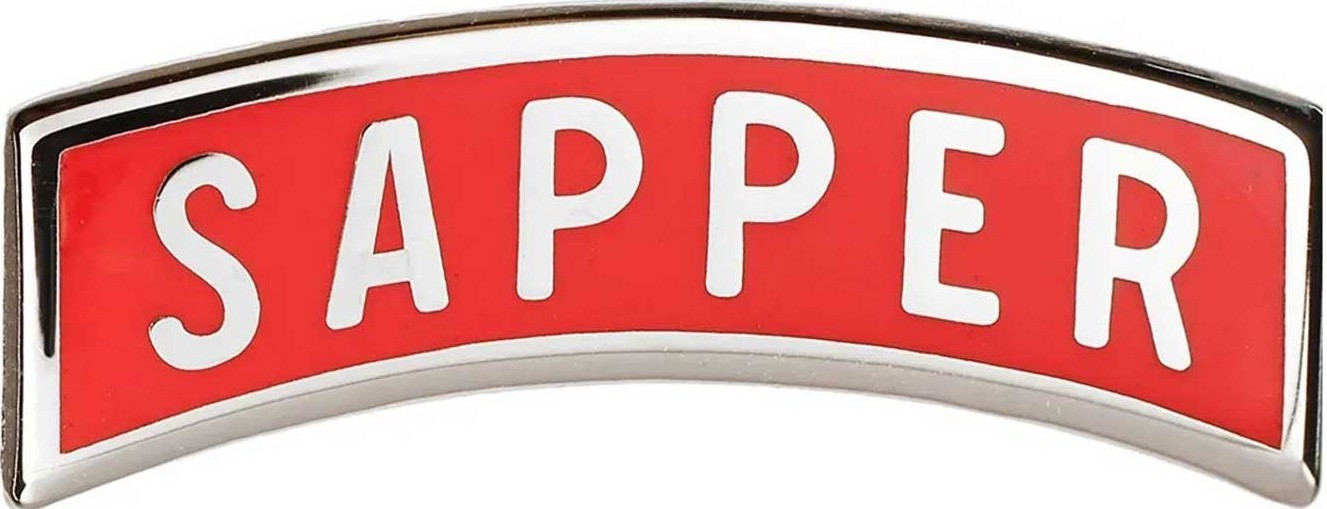
Sapper Tab

Jungle Tab

=== Group 5 ===
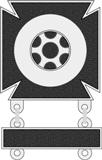
Driver and Mechanic Badge
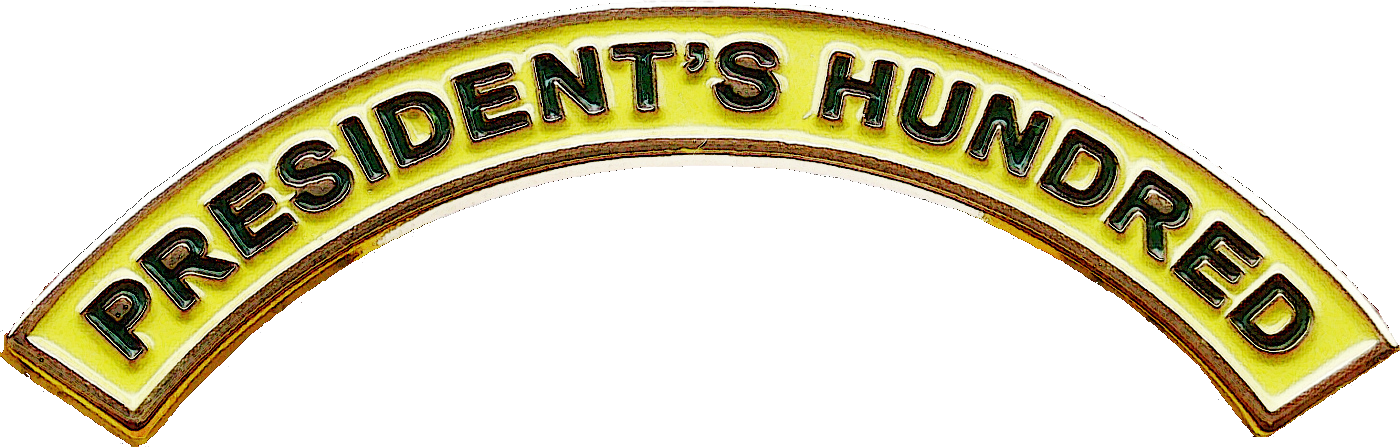
President's Hundred Tab

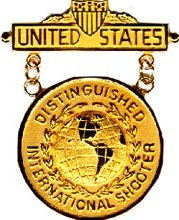
Distinguished International Shooter Badge

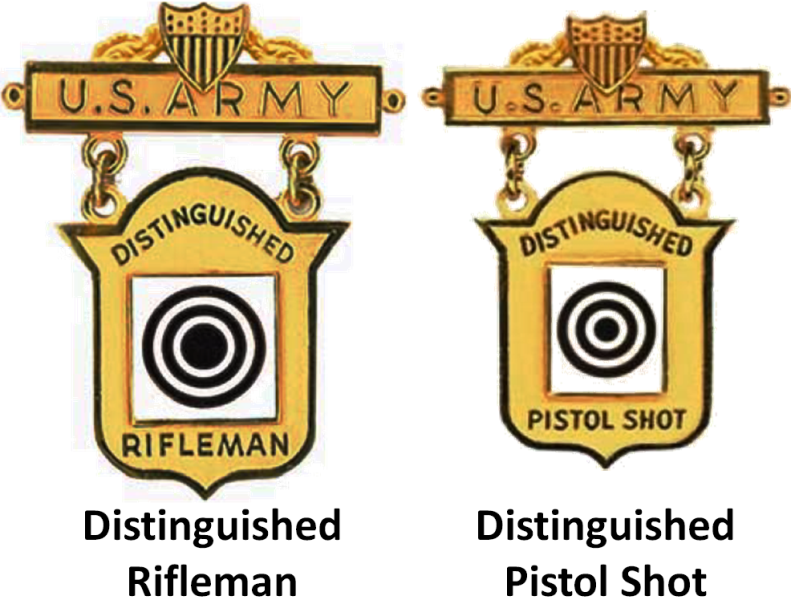
Distinguished Shooter Badges

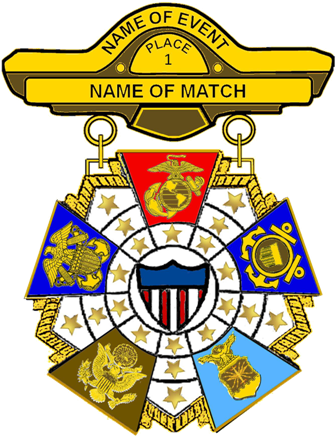
Interservice Competition Badges

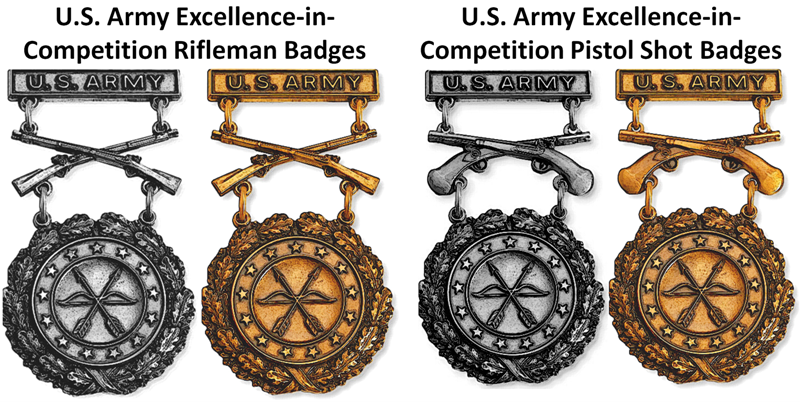
Excellence-In-Competition Badges

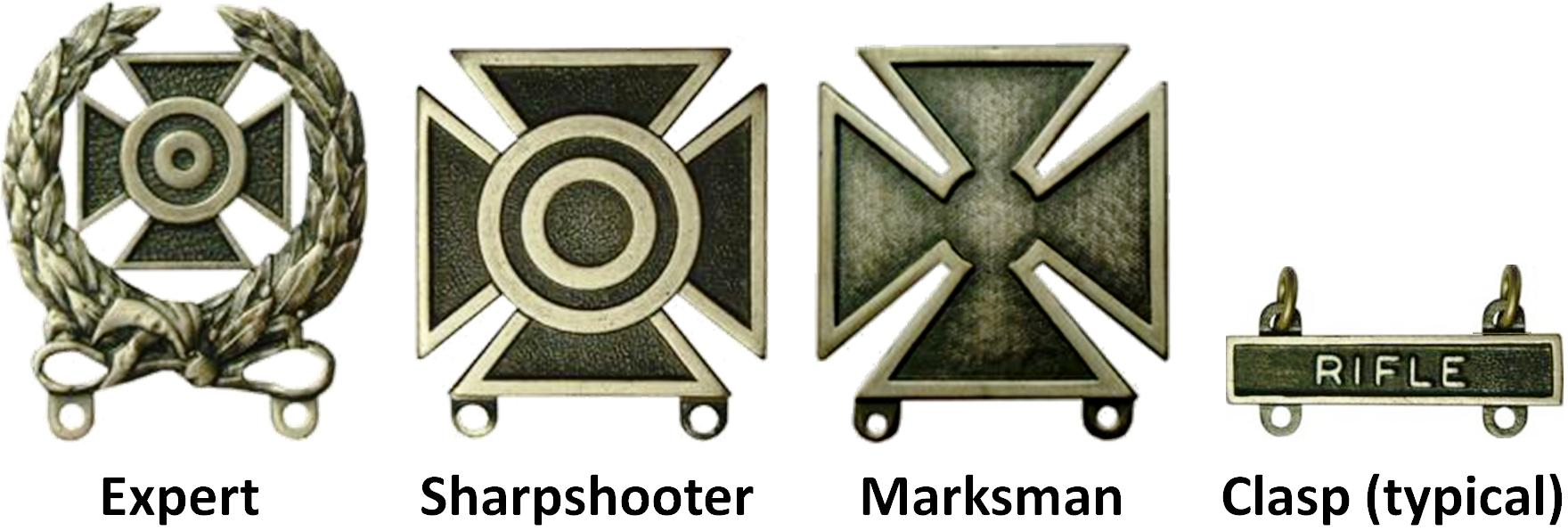
Marksmanship Qualification Badges

== Identification Badges ==
Army Staff Identification Badge

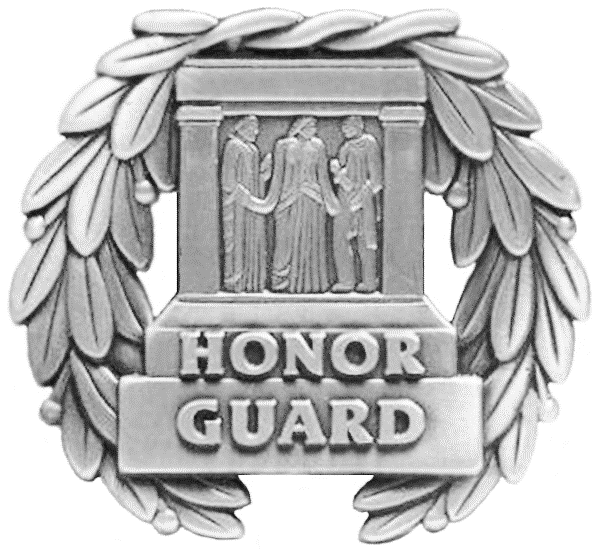
Guard, Tomb of the Unknown Soldier Identification Badge

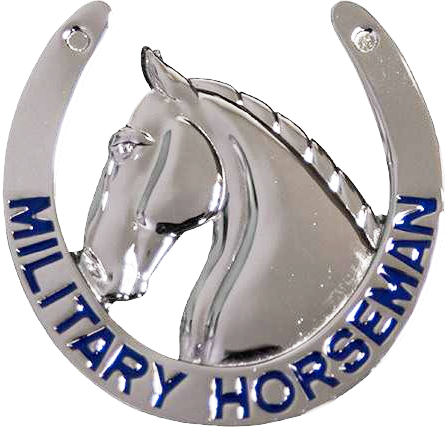
Military Horseman Identification Badge

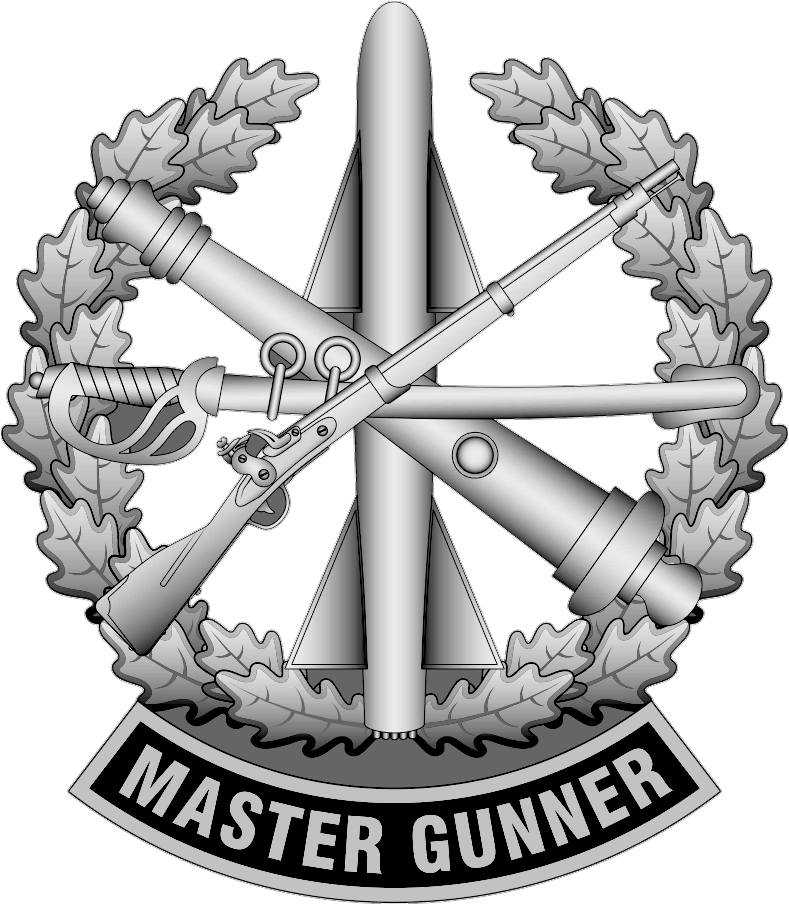
Master Gunner Identification Badge

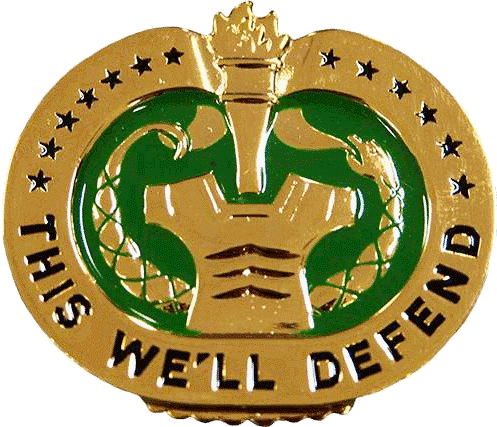
Drill Sergeant Identification Badge

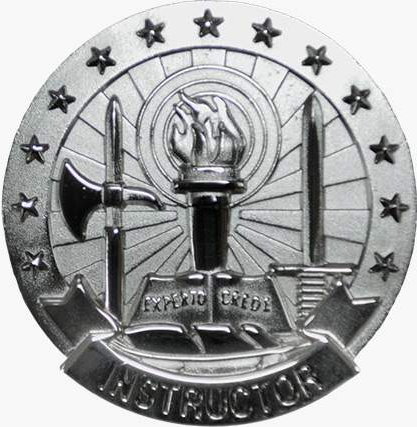
Instructor Identification Badges

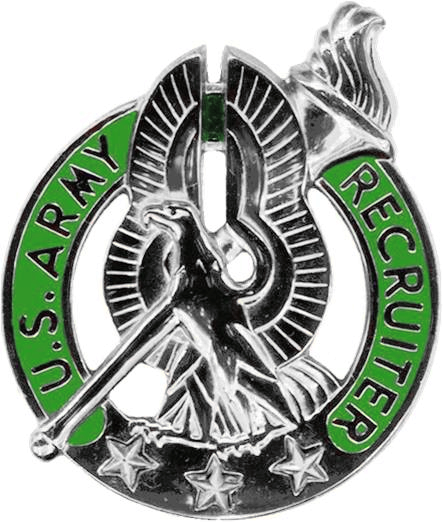
Army Recruiter Badges

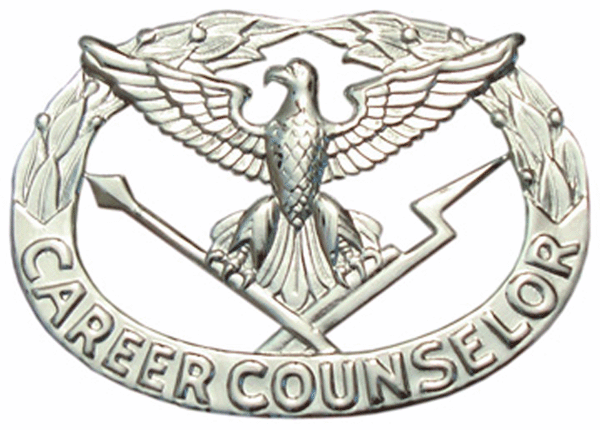
Career Counselor Badge

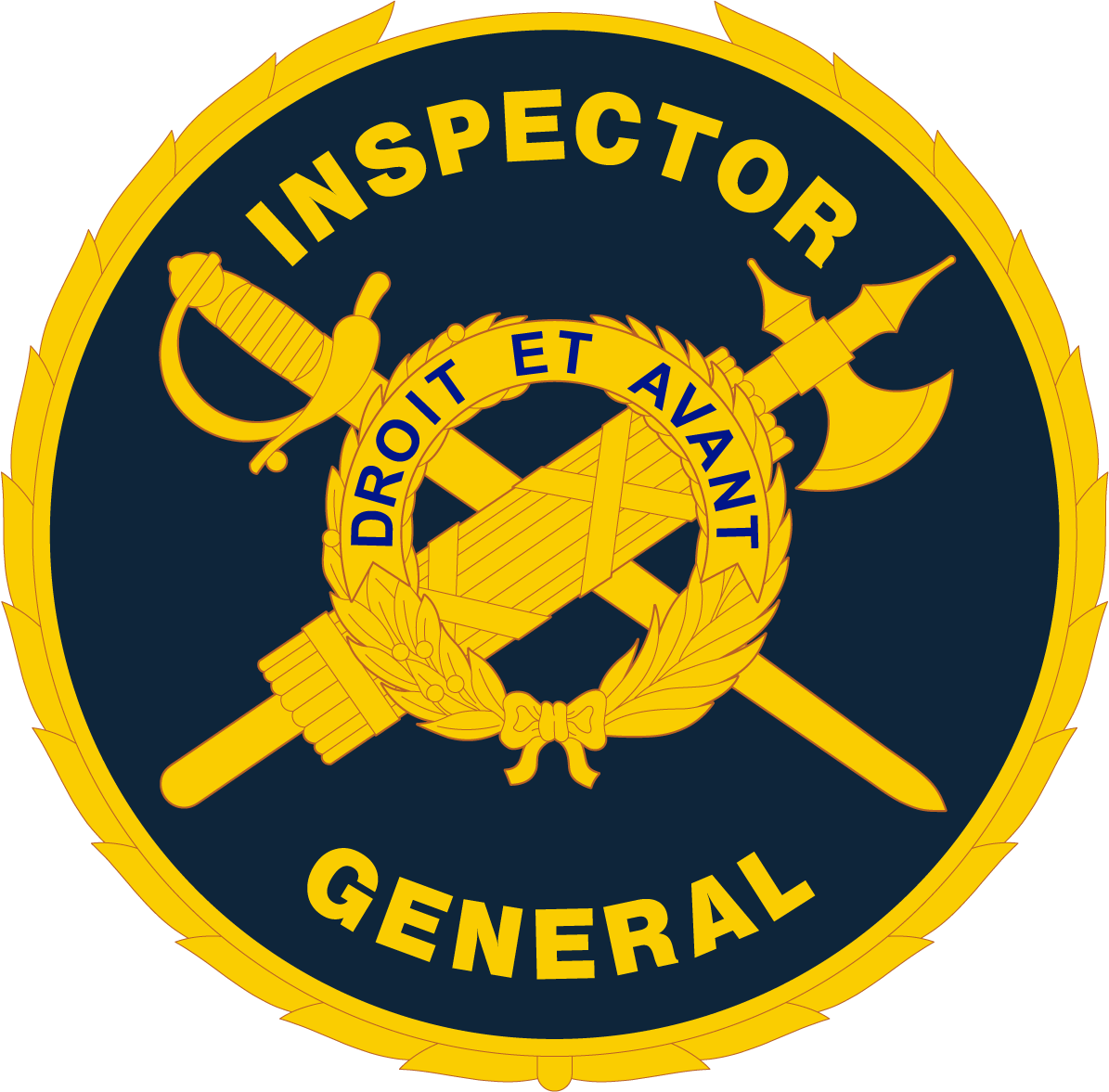
Army Inspector General Identification Badge

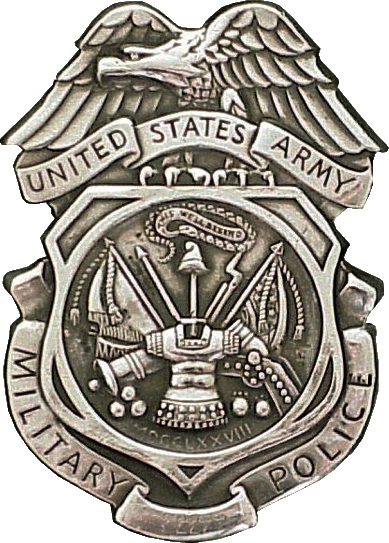
Military Police Identification Badge

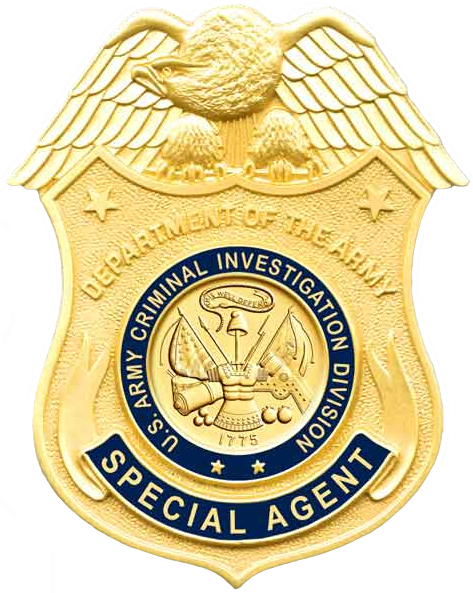
Criminal Investigation Division Special Agent Badge

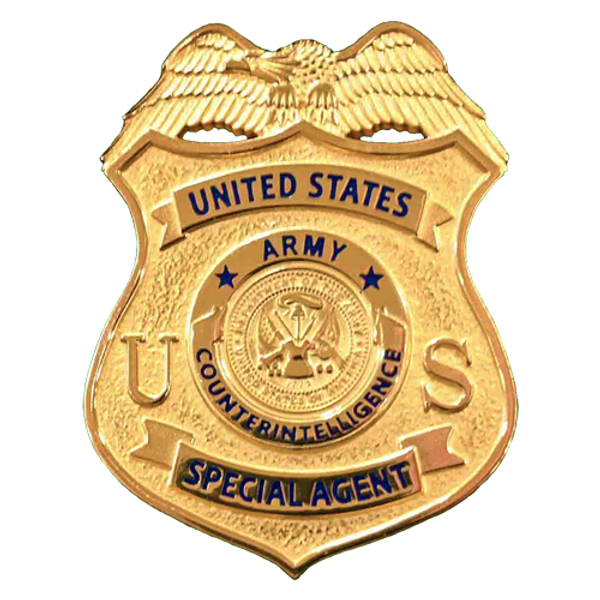
Counterintelligence Special Agent Badge

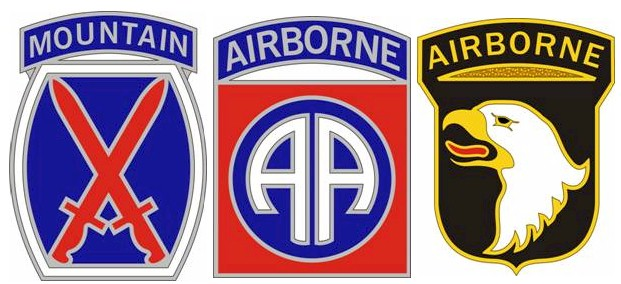
Combat Service Identification Badges

== Other Accoutrements ==
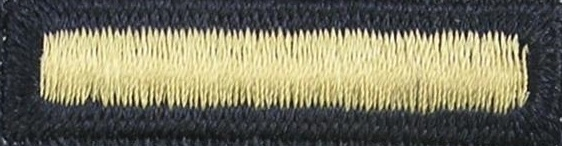
Overseas Service Bars

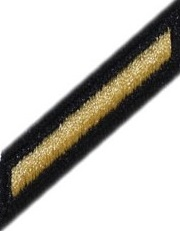
Service Stripes

== National Guard Badges ==
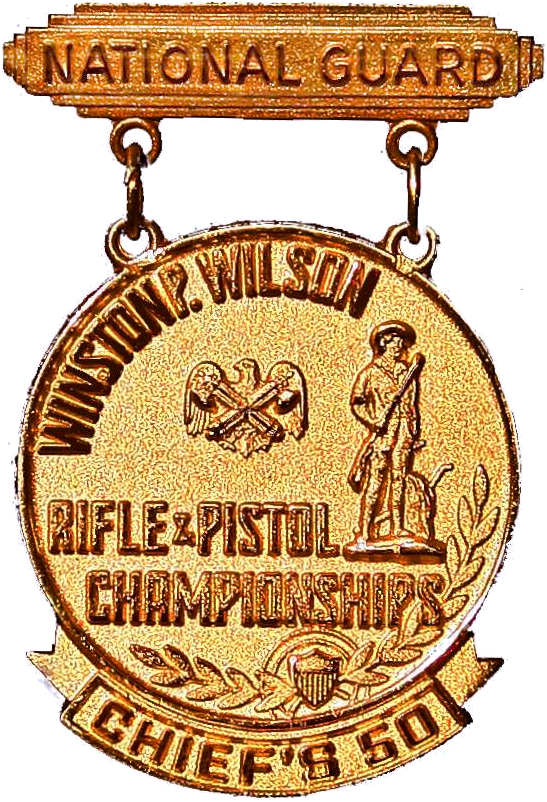
Chief's 50 Marksmanship Badge*

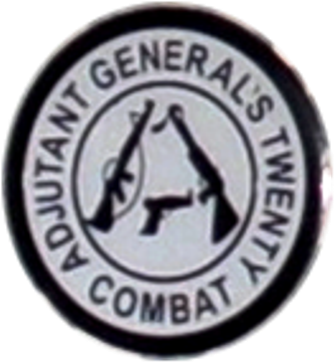
Adjutant General's Twenty Combat Badge (MO NG)

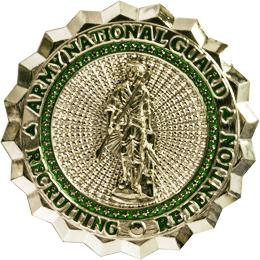
Army National Guard Recruiter & Retention Badges

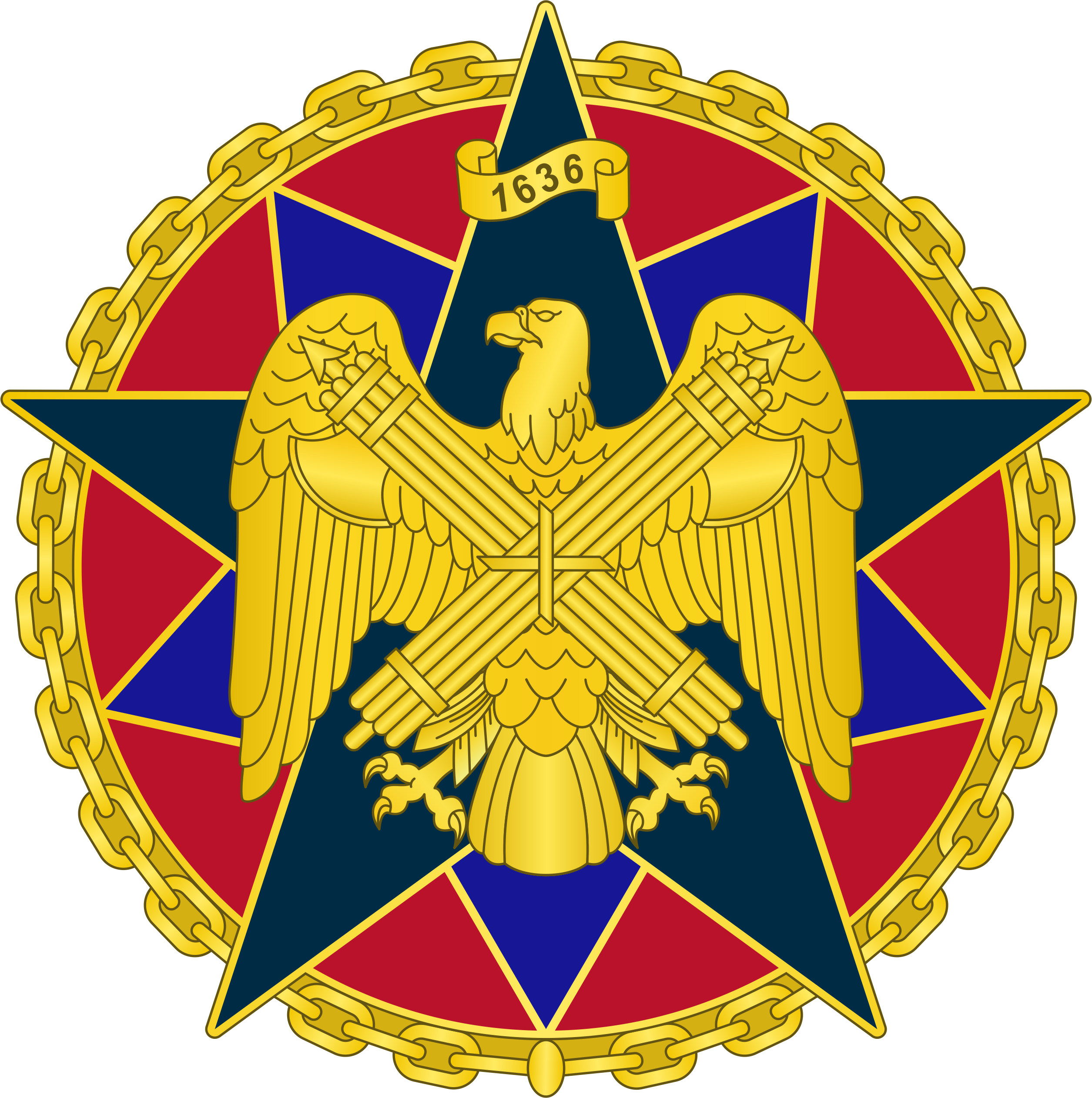
National Guard Bureau Organizational Badge*

== Mariner Badges ==
Mariner Badges
US Army Mariner Badge Basic		
US Army Mariner Badge Basic	US Army Mariner Badge Senior	US Army Mariner Badge Master

In October 2024, Sergeant Major of the Army (SMA) Michael Weimer reported that a badge for Army mariners would be instituted. SMA Weimer stated that Soldiers serving on Army watercraft and ships would be eligible for the badge. On 20 March 2025, the badge design was unveiled publicly and it is set to be named the "Mariner Badge." The U.S. Army's Institute of Heraldry has until 19 May 2025 to alter the proposed design. The badge is intended to come in three versions; "basic," "senior," and "master," with the Army only releasing images of the "basic" version of the badge as of 20 March 2025. The basic, senior, and master Mariner Badges will be considered Department of the Army "identification badges" (similar to the Drill Sergeant Identification Badge or Master Gunner Identification Badge) and their wear and precedence will be regulated by AR 600-8-22 and AR 670-1. On March 16, 2025 the Army released message ALARACT 025/2025 about the new badges and on March 24, 2025 Task and Purpose reported that the Institute of Heraldry had released the three designs. On 19 May 2026 soldiers from the 8th Special Troops Battalion, 8th Theater Sustainment Command were awarded their Mariner Badges.

== Notes ==
- * = also issued to Air Force airmen
- ** = also issued to airmen and Space Force guardians
- No asterisk indicates that the badge is issued only to soldiers

== See also ==
- Distinctive unit insignia (U.S. Army)
- Military badges of the United States
- Identification badges of the United States military
- Obsolete badges of the United States military
- Shoulder Sleeve Insignia (United States Army)
- Tabs of the United States Army
- Uniforms of the United States Army
- United States military beret flash
- List of United States Army careers
- United States Army branch insignia
