= Combat Medical Badge =

- Type: Badge
- Awarded for: Performing medical duties while being engaged by the enemy
- Presented by: United States Army
- Eligibility: An army medic supporting a ground combat arms unit brigade or lower. Restricted to ranks of colonel and below at time of award.
- Status: Currently awarded
- Established: January 1945
- First award: 6 December 1941 (retroactive)

Precedence
- Next (higher): Combat Infantryman Badge
- Next (lower): Combat Action Badge
- Related: Expert Field Medical Badge

The Combat Medical Badge is an award of the United States Army which was created in January 1945. Any member of the Army Medical Department, at the rank of colonel or below, who is assigned or attached to a ground combat arms unit of brigade or smaller size which provides medical support during any period in which the unit was engaged in ground combat is eligible for the CMB. According to the award criterion, the individual must be performing medical duties while simultaneously being engaged by the enemy; strict adherence to this requirement and its interpretation (e.g., distant mortar rounds vs. direct small arms fire) will vary by unit. As of 3 June 2005, Special Forces medics are no longer eligible for award, but may receive the Combat Infantryman Badge. A revision has allowed aviation medics to be eligible for the CMB. The non-combat proficiency equivalent is the Expert Field Medical Badge (EFMB).

In mid-2025 the Army introduced "master combat badges," including the Master Combat Medical Badge. The badge recognize those who have earned both a CMB and either an EFMB, Expert Infantryman Badge, or Expert Soldier Badge.

== Appearance ==
The Combat Medical Badge is one inch tall and one and a half inches wide.

== History ==
The Combat Medical Badge is retroactive to 6 December 1941. The original decoration was considered a one-time decoration, however this directive was rescinded in 1951 allowing for multiple awards of the Combat Medical Badge denoted by stars encircling the decoration. According to the US Army Medical Department Regiment, to date there have been only two soldiers that have earned the Combat Medical Badge with two stars: Henry Jenkins and Wayne Slagel. The directive was again altered in 1969 to specify that only one award of the Combat Medical Badge is authorized for service in the Vietnam Conflict Era, which included service in Vietnam and Laos, the Dominican Republic, and South Korea (subsequent to 4 January 1969). Current regulations have expanded this qualifying period to include service in El Salvador, Grenada, Panama, Southwest Asia, and Somalia, and have added an additional qualifying period (the Global War on Terror Era) covering service in Iraq and Afghanistan.

In 1947, a policy was implemented that authorized the retroactive award of the Bronze Star to soldiers who had received the Combat Medical Badge during the Second World War. The basis for this regulation was that the Combat Medical Badge, like the Combat Infantryman Badge, was awarded only to soldiers who had borne combat duties befitting the Bronze Star Medal, and also that both the badge and medal required a recommendation by the unit commander and a citation in orders.

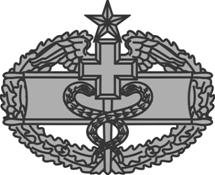
Second award

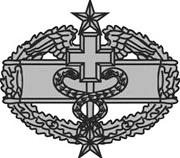
Third award

The CMB is authorized for award for the following qualifying periods:

World War II Era

1. World War II (7 December 1941 to 3 September 1945).

Korean War Era

2. The Korean War (27 June 1950 to 27 July 1953).

Vietnam War Era

3. Republic of Vietnam Conflict (2 March 1961 to 28 March 1973), combined with qualifying service in Laos (19 April 1961 to 6 October 1962).
4. Dominican Republic (28 April 1965 to 1 September 1966).
5. Korea on the DMZ (4 January 1969 to 31 March 1994).
6. El Salvador (1 January 1981 to 1 February 1992).
7. Grenada (23 October to 21 November 1983).
8. Joint Security Area, Panmunjom, Korea (23 November 1984).
9. Panama (20 December 1989 to 31 January 1990).
10. Southwest Asia Conflict (17 January to 11 April 1991).
11. Somalia (5 June 1992 to 31 March 1994).

Global War on Terror Era

12. Afghanistan (Operations Enduring Freedom - Afghanistan and Freedom's Sentinel, 5 December 2001 to 30 August 2021).
13. Iraq (Operations Iraqi Freedom and New Dawn, 19 March 2003 to 31 December 2011).

As of 2005 the rules for eligibility were changed to allow any medical department soldier in a brigade or lower unit to be eligible so long as they are engaged in actual ground combat and performed medical duties. This now includes Soldiers assigned to aviation units. Additionally, in 2008, IED/VBIEDs can now be considered direct contact with the enemy.

As of June 2011, the badge and its sew-on equivalent may be worn on the Army Combat Uniform (ACU).

== Master Combat Medical Badge ==
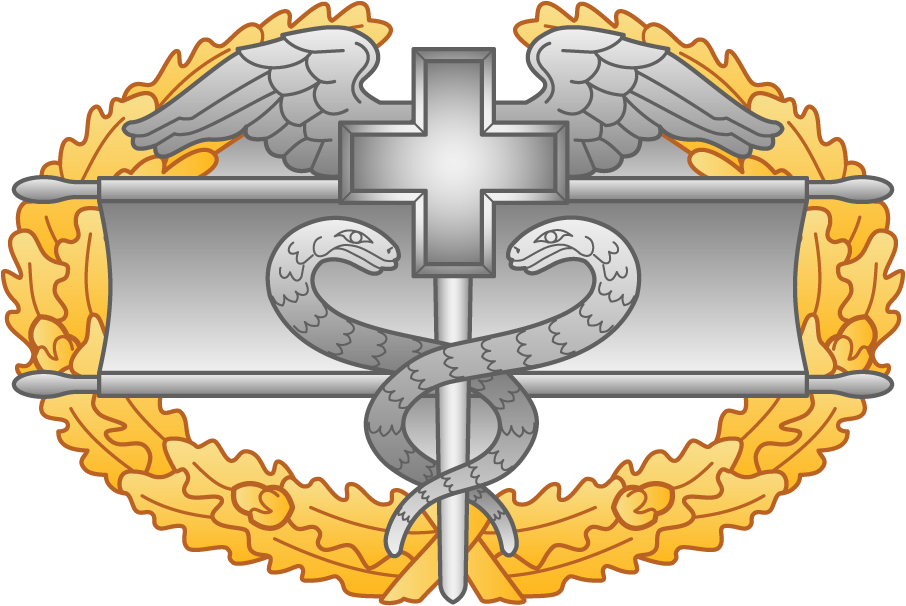
Master Combat Medical Badge

In mid-2025 "master combat badges" were introduced, specifically the Master Combat Infantryman Badge (MCIB), Master Combat Medical Badge (MCMB), and Master Combat Action Badge (MCAB). The badges represent those who have earned both a combat badge (Combat Infantryman Badge (CIB), Combat Medical Badge (CMB), or CAB) and an expert badge (Expert Infantryman Badge (EIB), Expert Field Medical Badge (EFMB), or Expert Soldier Badge (ESB)). The "master badges" appear identical to their respective combat badges, replacing the silver wreaths on the full-color metal badges with gold wreaths; subdued pin-on badges and sew-on badges would see their black wreaths also replaced with gold. Soldiers that had earned a combat badge but a "separate" expert badge (a CIB and an EFMB, for example) would wear the master badge aligning with their combat badge (in the case of a CIB and an EFMB, the awardee would wear the MCIB). In March 2025, the Army confirmed the new "master combat" badges would be available via Army & Air Force Exchange Service by 21 March 2025.

MCMB 2nd Award	MCMB 3rd Award

== See also ==
- Military badges of the United States
