= Master Gunner Identification Badge =

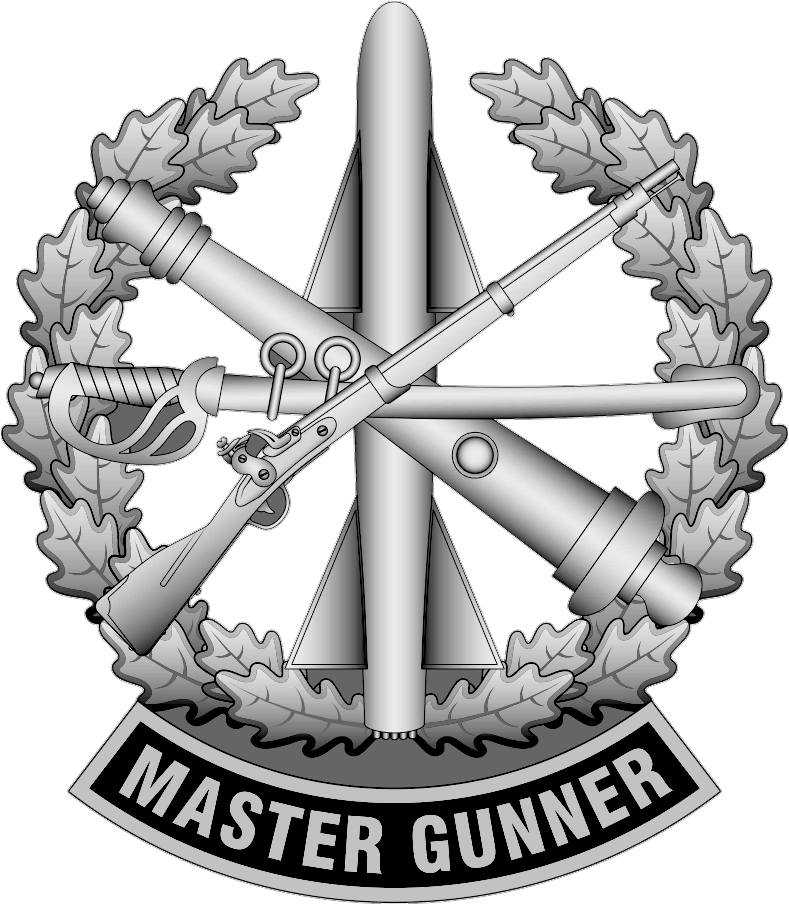
- U.S. Army Master Gunner Identification Badge
- Type: Identification Badge
- Presented by: U.S. Army
- Eligibility: Graduation from a U.S. Army master gunner certification program
- Status: Currently awarded
- Established: 31 January 2019
- First award: 8 January 2018

Precedence
- Next (higher): Driver and Mechanic Badge
- Related: Identification badges

The Master Gunner Identification Badge (MGIB) recognizes soldiers of the United States Army who complete one of eight U.S. Army master gunner courses and is an indicator for commanders and soldiers to value the master gunner's advice regarding the training and employment of weapon systems. According to Military.com, the Master Gunner Identification Badge is the first badge recognizing a soldier's achievement of earning the prestigious position of master gunner, a position created nearly 400 years ago.

== Background ==
Sergeant Cinthia Ramirez
Documentary about Sergeant Cinthia Ramirez, the first active duty female soldier to earn the Master Gunner title and badge (2022).

According to a U.S. Army article, the master gunner is the technical and tactical experts for their weapon's platform. They advise the commander on everything related to the vehicle platform and weapon systems. They also develop training materials to conduct gunnery and live-fire exercises. "I rely on my master gunners. I probe them for information based on how best to maintain our weapons as well as train our crews... They are there every step of the way from the time we put those crews together until the time we qualify them...," said Captain Kevin Zhang of the 1st Cavalry Division. "Master gunners are trained in methodology... What it boils down to is knowing the standard and being that person in the unit to enforce the standard, and to make sure that people are qualifying correctly... We're also experts in current gun maintenance so we can troubleshoot and fix a lot of problems and issues that may occur at the range, on the spot, instead of having to fall back to unit mechanics," explained Sergeant 1st Class Nathan Quarberg of the 1st Cavalry Division.

== Criteria ==
The nine U.S. Army master gunner courses eligible to award the MGIB to its graduates are:

- Field Artillery Master Gunnery Course
- Master Gunnery–M1/M1A1 Abrams Course
- Infantry fighting vehicle Master Gunner Course
- Avenger Master Gunner Course
- M1A2 Abrams System Enhancement Package (SEP) Master Gunner Course
- Stryker Master Gunner Course
- Patriot Master Gunner Course
- Aviation Master Gunner Course
- SGT STOUT (M-SHORAD) Master Gunner Course

== Badge design ==
The final design of the MGIB was officially approved by the United States Army Institute of Heraldry (TIOH) on 31 January 2019 but was awarded to the first graduating classes of key U.S. Army fires schools on 8 January 2018. According to the NCO Journal, the MGIB was designed to recognize both the schools and different U.S. Army branch histories with gunnery:

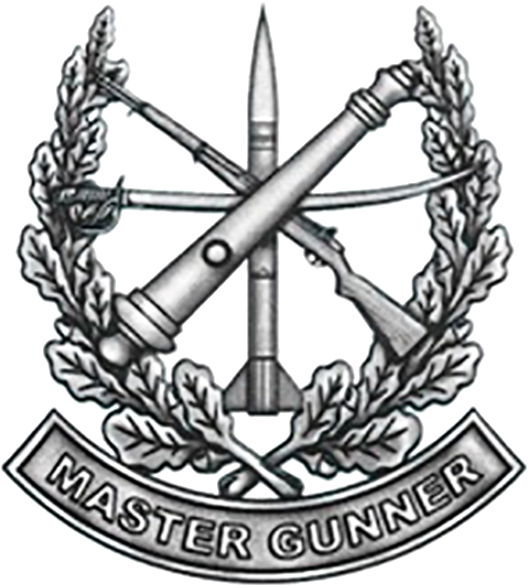
Original design concept for the Master Gunner Badge—note the difference between this and the TIOH approved version

A laurel wreath will represent victory of the maneuver force, a symbol of victory since ancient Greek mythology featured the god Apollo wearing a laurel wreath around his head.

Inside the wreath, a sabre will highlight the Armor Branch, a symbol since 1851 adopted after the American Civil War when the mounted cavalry had great success on the battlefield swinging the curved, 36 in (91 cm) long, single-edged blade.

The 1795 model Springfield musket will honor the Infantry Branch, a symbol of the first official model of musket originally built at the Springfield Armory in Massachusetts.

The crossed 19th-century-style cannon will continue to symbolize the Field Artillery Branch just as it has since 1834, when individual field artilleryman wore the insignia on their cap.

The missile in the center will represent the Air Defense Artillery Branch, just as it has for 50 years when they adopted the Field Artillery cross-cannons and added a missile, evolving from the Coast Artillery Corps whose insignia featured cross-cannons with a projectile in the center.

The approved design of the MGIB comes in three versions: regular size, regular size–subdued (both at 3 in (8 cm)), and a miniature version (at 1.5 in (4 cm)). The non-subdued version is made of polished nickel silver with a scroll at its base covered in a black textured epoxy.
