= Expert Soldier Badge =

Award of the United States Army

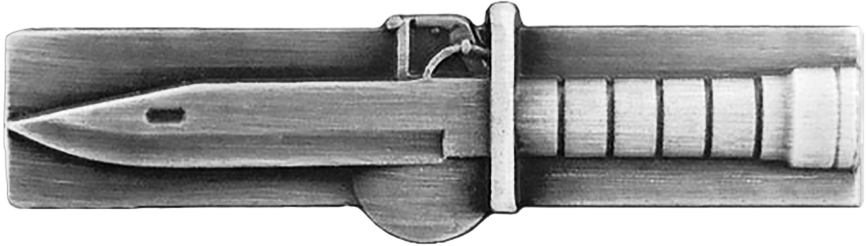
- US Army Expert Soldier Badge
- Type: Special Skill Badge
- Presented by: United States Army
- Eligibility: Soldiers of the U.S. Army, other than Infantry, United States Army Special Forces, or Combat Medic occupations
- Status: October 2019–present
- Related: Expert Infantry Badge and Expert Field Medical Badge

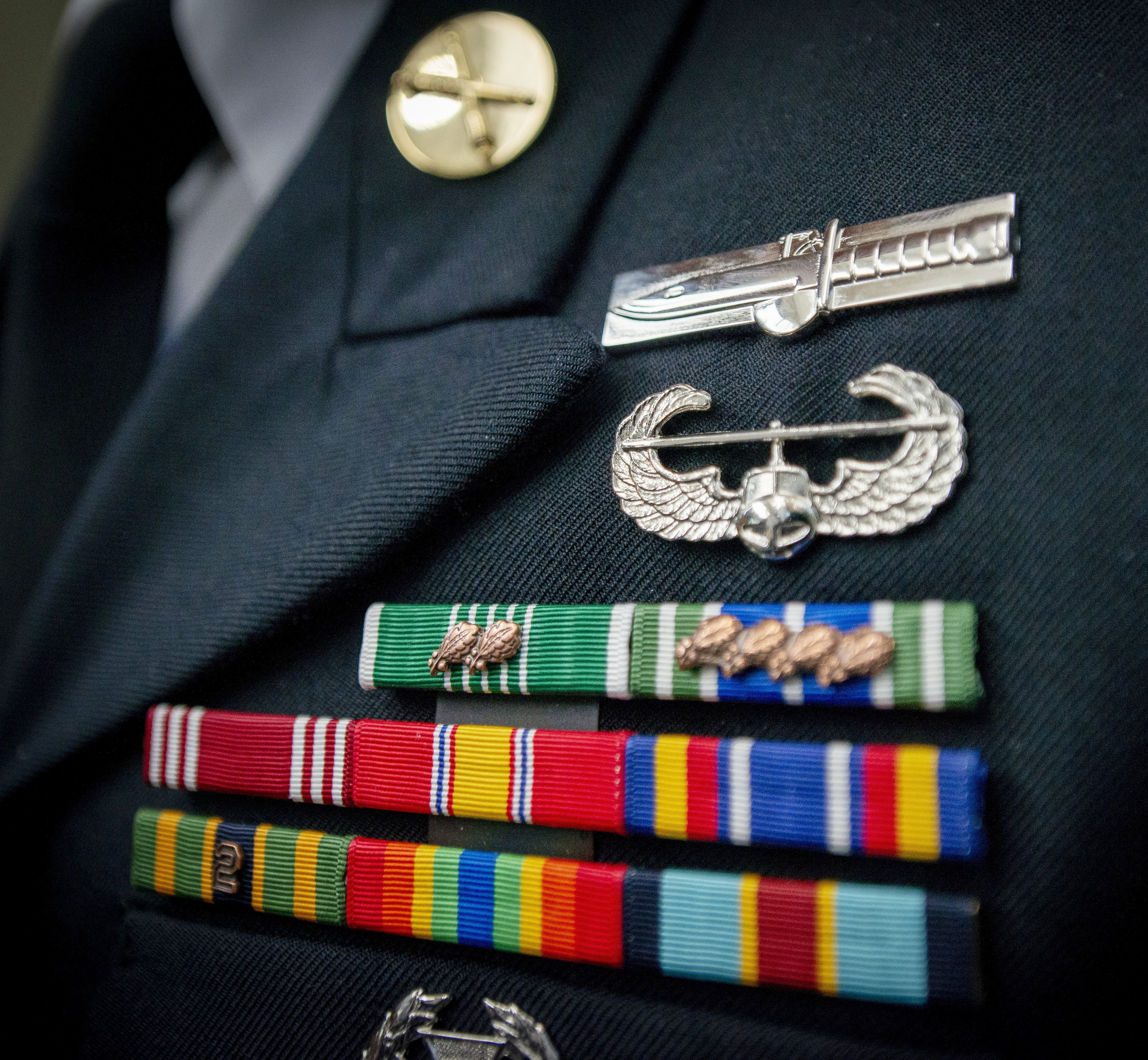
First awarding of the Expert Soldier Badge to SSG Tyler Lewis, a Firefinder Radar Operator (13R), 15 October 2019

The Expert Soldier Badge, or ESB, is a special skills badge of the United States Army. Similar in appearance to the Combat Action Badge (CAB), the ESB is awarded to soldiers other than infantry, Special Forces, or combat medics, who demonstrate their competence in various warrior- and mission-essential tasks, land navigation, and physical fitness. The badge was approved on June 14, 2019 and entered service in October 2019, as a way for soldiers in military occupational specialties other than special forces, infantry or combat medics to certify their competence within their occupation, as well as general combat skills.

As of 2025, personnel who have been awarded both the ESB (or any "expert" badge) and the CAB are authorized to wear the Master Combat Action Badge; otherwise, the CAB and ESB may not be worn together.

== History ==
The concept of the ESB (initially referred to as the Expert Action Badge) was initially proposed in 2015 as part of the United States Army Training and Doctrine Command's Non-Commissioned Officer (NCO) 2020 Strategy, as one way to improve combat readiness in the Army. The ESB was first openly discussed on March 30, 2017, at an NCO Development Town Hall hosted by Command Sergeant Major David Davenport. Discussion mainly focused on the intent of the badge, as well as the possible criteria for award. The feasibility of the ESB was tested at Joint Base Lewis-McChord in April of the same year, with 53 soldiers taking part in the event. The results of the test at McChord, as well as future testing, will be used to determine if the criteria for the badge appropriately conveys the badge's intent. The NCO 2020 Strategy, including the ESB, was further discussed in 2018 at a conference held at Fort Knox.

== Criteria ==
The criteria for award of the ESB is that a soldier must perform in 30 Warrior Tasks (Skill Level 1) and battle drills, and five unit–level mission essential tasks, chosen by a commander, in addition to completion of a 12-mile foot march, a land navigation test and the Army Combat Fitness Test. Testing is conducted at the brigade-level, with units being given a week to set up the test course, a few days of training, and then a few days of testing.

== Design ==
Expert Soldier Badge

Combat Action Badge

The design for the ESB is similar to that of the Combat Action Badge. It features the same M9 bayonet and M67 fragmentation grenade, superimposed on a rectangular base, as found on the Combat Action Badge. The ESB does not, however, feature a wreath.

== Master Combat Action Badge ==
Metal, full-color Master Combat Action Badge

In mid-2025 "master combat badges" were introduced, specifically the Master Combat Infantryman Badge (MCIB), Master Combat Medical Badge (MCMB), and Master Combat Action Badge (MCAB). The badges recognize those who have earned both a combat badge (Combat Infantryman Badge (CIB), Combat Medical Badge (CMB), or CAB) and an expert badge (Expert Infantryman Badge (EIB), Expert Field Medical Badge (EFMB), or Expert Soldier Badge (ESB)). The "master badges" appear identical to their respective combat badges, replacing the silver wreaths on the full-color metal badges with gold wreaths; subdued pin-on badges and sew-on badges would see their black wreaths also replaced with gold. Soldiers that had earned a combat badge but a "separate" expert badge (a CIB and an EFMB, for example) would wear the master badge aligning with their combat badge (in the case of a CIB and an EFMB, the awardee would wear the MCIB). In March 2025, the Army confirmed the new "master combat" badges would be available via Army & Air Force Exchange Service by 21 March 2025.

== See also ==
- Badges of the United States Army
- Military badges of the United States
- Uniforms of the United States Army
