= Unofficial badges of the United States military =

Unofficial badges of the United States military are those badges or emblems that do not appear in United States military regulations but that many individuals serving in the United States military wear or display. Unofficial badges may also be bestowed for a one time action or be authorized under the authority of a local commander.

Unofficial military badges are rare in the modern age due to the stringent and specific regulations regarding the issuance of military badges and the manner of wear on military uniforms. The term may still be used, however, to denote badges that were proposed for creation but never actually distributed as well as the badges that individuals continue to place in personal award displays, wear on civilian clothing, or occasionally wear on their uniform at the risk of reprimand.

Airmobile Combat Cavalry Badge

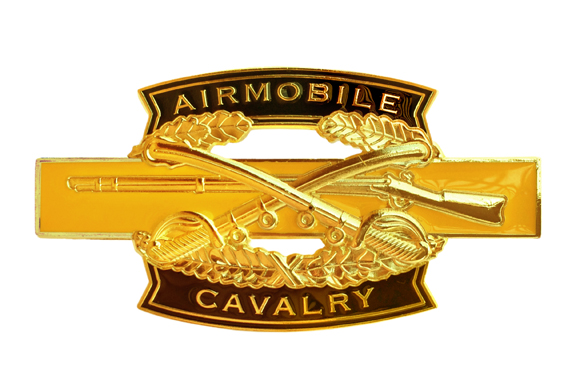

== Army service ==
Combat Armor Badge

Combat Cavalry Badge

Combat Engineer Badge

Combat Artillery Badge

Close Combat Badge

The Combat Infantryman Badge (CIB) was introduced in 1943 for soldiers in the Infantry Branch of the U.S. Army who personally fought in active ground combat. Other branches argued in favor of their own badges to signify active combat, but a War Department review board just after the war ruled these out. Despite this, unofficial versions of a Combat Artilleryman's Badge, a Combat Tanker's Badge and a Combat Cavalryman's Badge appeared. In some cases, these were made by simply pinning a piece of branch insignia on top of a CIB and repainting the blue field in the appropriate branch color, but others involved making a badge and replacing the rifle of the CIB with crossed cannons (on a red background), a tank (on a green background, which is not the Armor color of yellow, but was during World War Two) or crossed sabers (on a yellow background).

These unsanctioned badges were generally not worn on a soldiers actual uniform, but instead might have been displayed in personal award displays like shadow boxes. Occasionally, if a unit commander saw fit to allow the badges for wear, soldiers may have worn them on their dress uniforms for special events, reviews, inspections, or dinners. It is not likely that many if any soldiers sewed on a subdued version of the badge onto their utility uniforms (as with official army badges), and therefore this badge was likely to only have been worn on dress uniforms. The only truly widespread use of these combat badges was probably on personally owned items, like ballcaps and car decals.

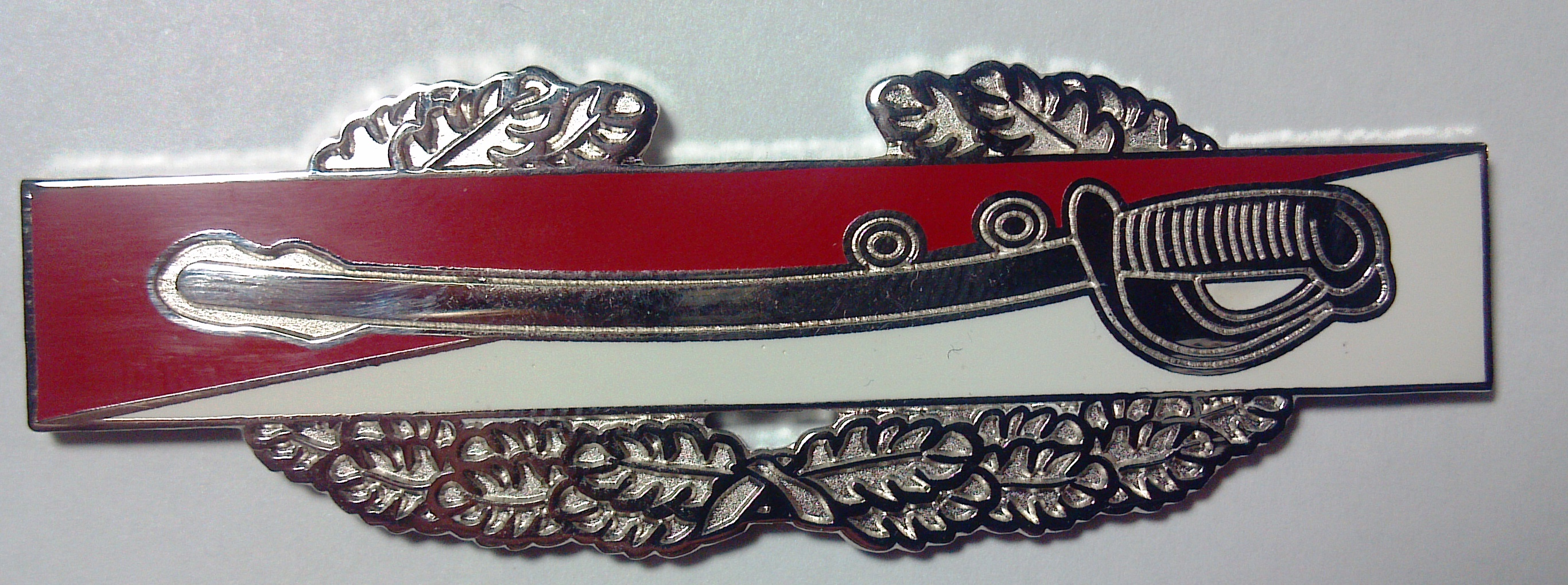
Alternative Combat Cavalry Badge (2009)

In 2004, Congressman Mark Green, (Republican, Wisconsin) introduced H.R. 3950 to provide for the establishment of a combat artillery badge to recognize combat service by artillerymen. While none of the other unofficial badges were covered in H.R. 3950, the bill ultimately did not make it out of committee anyway. The final demise of these unofficial badges began when the National Defense Authorization Act (NDAA) of 2005 required the Secretary of the Army to establish a Combat Recognition Ribbon (CRR) to recognize the combat service of all branches. The CRR would therefore provide an official award that fulfilled the role of the unofficial branch-specific badges. A combat recognition ribbon was never developed by the army because it was scrapped in favor of a Close Combat Badge (CCB). The CCB would recognize specific armor, cavalry, field artillery and combat engineer soldiers who served in units purposefully reorganized to routinely conduct infantry-unique close combat missions and were personally present and under fire while conducting those types of missions. This badge would not honor the combat service of soldiers of these branches, but instead signal that their unit had been purposely deployed to fulfill the role of an infantry unit in a combatzone. Finally, these restrictive criteria were scrapped and the army created the Combat Action Badge for soldiers of any branch in any unit who enter into combat with the enemy. This new badge makes obsolete the unofficial branch-specific combat badges.

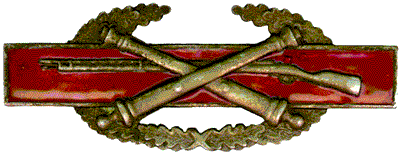
Example of a Combat Artillery Badge being created by pinning the artillery branch insignia over a Combat Infantryman Badge

Recorded instances of the unofficial combat badges actually being worn are rare, but the following comes from the memoir of a Korean War veteran:

At one meal in the mess hall, a young fellow was eating at the same table as I. He was wearing a medal on his left chest. The medal looked similar to a Combat Infantryman Badge, the difference being that the background was red and the weapon an artillery gun barrel. I told him that the US Army did not confer such a medal. He got very mad at me. He was just a little fellow. I repeated my statement that there was no such medal. He said that it was a Combat Artilleryman Badge. I said that there was no such thing. His buddies huddled around him and glared at me. Every time we ran into each other on the ship, he was with his buddies and he gave me an angry look.

== See also ==
- Unofficial decorations of the United States military
- Obsolete military awards of the United States
- Obsolete badges of the United States military
