= Combat Action Badge =

United States Army award

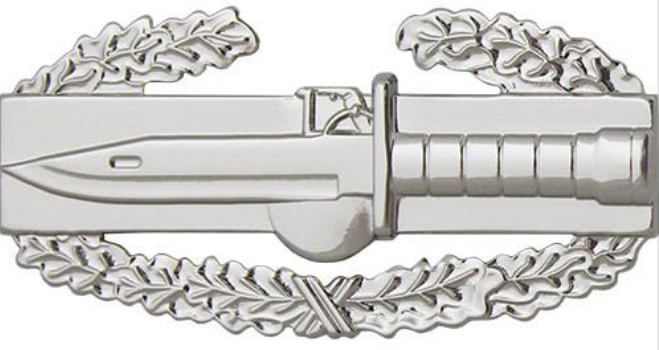
- Type: Badge
- Awarded for: Actively engaging or being engaged by the enemy, and performing satisfactorily in accordance with prescribed rules of engagement after September 18, 2001
- Presented by: United States Army
- Eligibility: U.S. Army soldiers not in an infantry, special forces, or medical MOS
- Status: actively awarded
- Established: May 2, 2005
- First award: June 29, 2005 (retroactive to September 18, 2001)

Highlights
- Total recipients: 68,686 in OIF (as of June 26, 2012); 37,914 in OEF (as of June 26, 2012); 3,828 in OND (as of June 26, 2012); 30 OIR (as of February 12, 2018)

Precedence
- Next (higher): Combat Medical Badge
- Next (lower): Expert Infantryman Badge

The Combat Action Badge (CAB) is a United States military award given to soldiers of the U.S. Army of any rank and who are not members of an infantry, special forces, or medical MOS, for being "present and actively engaging or being engaged by the enemy and performing satisfactorily in accordance with prescribed rules of engagement" at any point in time after 18 September 2001.

On 2 May 2005, the chief of staff of the U.S. Army (CSA) approved the creation of the CAB to provide special recognition to U.S. soldiers who personally engaged, or are engaged by, the enemy. The CAB is intended to serve as a companion to the Combat Infantryman Badge (CIB) and Combat Medical Badge (CMB) and was created to recognize the greatly expanded role of non-infantry soldiers in active, ground combat.

U.S. Army infantrymen or special forces soldiers with the rank of colonel or below and who are a member of a brigade-sized or smaller infantry or special forces unit, receive the CIB instead of the CAB.

In mid-2025 the Army introduced "master combat badges," including the Master Combat Action Badge. The badge recognize those who have earned both a CAB and either an Expert Soldier Badge, Expert Infantryman Badge, or Expert Field Medical Badge.

== History ==
Since the Combat Infantryman Badge was introduced in 1943, followed by the Combat Medical Badge in 1945, other army branches argued in favor of their own badges, but a War Department review board just after the war ruled these out. Unofficial combat badges for non-infantry soldiers were in some instances worn in violation of uniform regulations or included in personal award displays wherein the rifle and blue field of the CIB were replaced with the appropriate army branch insignia and color. These unofficial combat badges began to appear shortly after the creation of the Combat Infantryman Badge and while the practice continued until the creation of an official non-infantry combat badge it never became widespread.

Throughout the Vietnam War and afterward, soldiers serving in combat engineer and armored units continued to lobby for their own version of the EIB/CIB. Despite numerous staff studies and recommendations, the request never gained the support of senior U.S. Army leadership. However, as soldiers from across the spectrum of military occupational specialties engaged in direct contact with enemy forces in the Global War on Terrorism, the proposal gained new traction.

It appears that the concept for the Combat Action Badge came when Captain Shawn Monien reignited the debate on establishing combat/expert badges for all soldiers of the United States Army in his September–October 2003 Armor magazine article, "Reinstating the Combat Tanker Badge" drawing historical references to General George S. Patton in World War I and other historical vignettes from World War II, the Korean War, the Vietnam War, and the Persian Gulf War. Monien's article encouraged former United States Army Chief of Armor, Major General Thomas H. Tait to re-join the effort:

Dear ARMOR,

I have been reluctant to enter the debate regarding the combat and expert armor badges. However, after reading the article by CPT Shawn Monien, "Reinstating the Combat Tanker Badge," in the September–October 2003 issue of ARMOR, I decided to put my oar in the water.

In the January–February 1988 issue of ARMOR, Commander's Hatch, (an editorial primarily written by Majors Scott Rowell and Bob Wilson), I stated we were developing a Scout's "rite of passage." The Scout Badge (SCB) proposed to be similar to the Expert Infantry Badge (EIB) and concentrated on individual scout skills. I also asked for your input. We designed the badge, similar to the EIB, except it had a saber instead of a rifle and was red and white. The requirements for the SCB were considered more difficult than those for the Combat Infantry Badge (CIB), as we did not want it to be considered, under any circumstances, to be easy. The design and requirements were sent through channels to the U.S. Army Training and Doctrine Command (TRADOC) and the proposal was turned down, either by TRADOC or Department of the Army — I do not remember which because consensus could not be reached by the sitting four stars. We fought the good fight and lost, saluted, and moved on.

Turning the calendar ahead to 1991 following Desert Storm, as Director of the Desert Storm Study Group, it was my pleasure to interview soldiers and leaders after the conflict and discuss things that went right and things that needed improving. My personal focus was with senior leaders (battalion-level commanders and above) and members of my team spent much of their time with troops. One thing that was very apparent was the disparity in awarding combat badges. For instance, the 1st Squadron, 4th Cavalry did not have enough 19Ds to man their tracks. They were given 11Ms and 11Bs as substitutes for the scouts. After the war, the infantrymen were given CIBs and scouts serving on the same track were given handshakes. The letter from Todd A. Mayer, reprinted in CPT Monien's article, which states that mortarmen in 4-64 Armor who never fired a shot received CIBs is another example of badges that were erroneously presented. When this type of information was presented to the DA General Officer Steering Group (GOSC) with a recommendation to create and award Combat Armor, Cavalry (Scout), and Engineer badges as they closed with, met, and destroyed the enemy, it was challenged by the Deputy Chief of Staff for Personnel, LTG Reno. When he stated it was not General Marshall's intent to give awards of this type to tankers, he was reminded that during WWII, Korea, and Vietnam it took 30 days of combat to receive a CIB. I also stated that I doubted General Marshall intended for infantrymen who rode around in Bradley Fighting Vehicles, mortar tracks, and busses to get them either. He relented. I am not trying to disparage our great infantry soldiers, but in my opinion, there are many others who fight and deserve equal recognition.

Once again, this went forward to the Chief of Staff of the Army and, once again, the four-star generals shot it down. I went to most of the division commanders who fought and to the two corps commanders and they were either supportive or offered no objection.

It is also interesting to note that Armor officers were told they could not wear the Vietnamese Armor Badge, but all other branches wore whatever the Vietnamese gave them. I found it interesting that the late LTG Tom Kelly wore his as a member of the joint staff while being interviewed on an almost daily basis by the media during Desert Storm. We also used to wear gunnery qualification badges on our fatigues. When we went to BDUs, we were told to take them off. However, if one looks at the number of badges on the uniforms of other branches of the Army, none of this makes sense.

Let's dust off the 1988 study by Office of the Chief of Armor and resubmit. I doubt if anything has changed that much and this issue has been "studied" long enough. THOMAS H. TAIT, Major General, U.S. Army, Retired

Major Matthew De Pirro continued the narrative of a combat badge in 2004 with an article written for Armor magazine in Spring 2004 describing the need for such a badge based upon the evolving face of warfare and the ongoing transformation of the army. De Pirro stated:

Fellow troopers, I submit to you that our Army would be better served by recognizing our soldiers who have faced an enemy in direct-fire combat with a Combat Action Badge. We are an Army in transformation. A few years ago, we donned the black beret as a symbol of that transformation. It is time for the disparity of the Combat Infantry Badge to end. It is time for the perceived badge wars to end. It is now time to take our transformation one step further. It is time for the Combat Action Badge.

The Combat Action Badge was originally planned as a ribbon which was to have been known as the "Combat Recognition Ribbon" (similar to the Navy/Marine Corps Combat Action Ribbon created in 1969). However, as ribbons are generally seen as less prestigious than medals and badges, the CAB was then proposed as the "Close Combat Badge" (or CCB), thus granting the award badge status vice ribbon. This was to be a combat award only for soldiers who did not hold the infantry military occupational specialty (MOS), but who were deployed specifically to fulfill an infantry duty. This was in response to the large number of non-infantry (Tank crews, Field Artillerymen example) who were deployed to Iraq in support of Operation Iraqi Freedom and whose units were reorganized to function as infantry (motorized or light) due to the lack of need for tanks, Artillery and shortage of infantry. The change from the Close Combat Badge to the Combat Action Badge may have come about thanks to a question put to Donald Rumsfeld in an April 2005 Afghanistan town hall meeting by a female military policeman as to why the CCB would not include military police soldiers in its awarding criteria despite the combat nature of the military police's job in Afghanistan and Iraq's 360-degree battlefield.

The Combat Action Badge was approved on May 2, 2005, and was retroactively awarded to soldiers who were engaged in combat after September 18, 2001. On June 29, 2005, General Peter J. Schoomaker awarded the CAB for the first time to Sergeants April Pashley, Michael Buyas, Manuel J. Montano, Timothy Gustafson and Sean Steans. Over one hundred thousand CABs have been awarded since the creation of the award. Most commanders do not issue the CAB to qualified soldiers unless they are directly engaged in combat. Notably, it is granted exclusively for contact with enemy combatants, so actions by noncombatants like detainees or rioting civilians do not qualify. The soldier must be personally present and actively engaging or being engaged by the enemy, and performing satisfactorily in accordance with the prescribed rules of engagement. There is no specific requirement for the enemy hostile contact to be direct.

== Eligibility requirements ==
The Combat Action Badge may be awarded to any soldier not assigned or attached to a unit that would qualify the soldier for the Combat Infantryman Badge (CIB) or Combat Medical Badge (CMB) after the date of September 18, 2001, and:

- The soldier must be personally present and under hostile fire while performing satisfactorily in accordance with the prescribed rules of engagement,
- The soldier must be performing their assigned duties associated with the unit's combat mission in an area where hostile fire pay or imminent danger pay is authorized,
- For all named conflicts beginning after the effective date of this publication (5 March 2019), a soldier must also be performing in an offensive or defensive act while participating in combat operations, engaging, or being engaged by the enemy.

The CAB may be awarded to any army branch or military occupational specialty including infantrymen except when serving in a role where they would be eligible for the CIB. In addition to Army soldiers, the CAB may also be awarded to Servicemembers of other U.S. Armed Forces and foreign military personnel assigned to a U.S. Army unit, provided they meet the above criteria (for example, KATUSA in the 2d Infantry Division).

The Combat Action badge is unique in that unlike the Combat Infantryman and Combat Medical badges, it can be awarded to soldiers of any rank, including general officers, whereas the CIB and CMB are both restricted to colonels and below.

Award of the CAB is not automatic and will not be awarded solely based on award of the Purple Heart.

== Qualifying conflicts, operations and periods ==
The only open qualifying period for the CAB is the global war on terrorism. Retroactive awards of the CAB are not authorized prior to 18 September 2001. Award of the CAB is authorized for the following qualifying wars, conflicts, and operations. A separate award of the CAB has been authorized for qualified soldiers in the following qualifying period:

- (1) Global War on Terrorism (18 September 2001 to a date to be determined)
  - (a) War in Afghanistan (OEF, 18 September 2001 to 31 December 2014; OFS, 1 January 2015 to a date to be determined).
  - (b) Iraq War (OIF, 19 March 2003 to 31 August 2010; OND, 1 September 2010 to 31 December 2011).
  - (c) Anti-terrorism operations in Iraq and Syria (OIR, 15 June 2014 to a date to be determined).

Award for qualifying service in any previous conflict is not authorized. Subsequent award of the CAB is not authorized for the same qualifying period, as outlined.

== Badge design, wear, and multiple awards ==
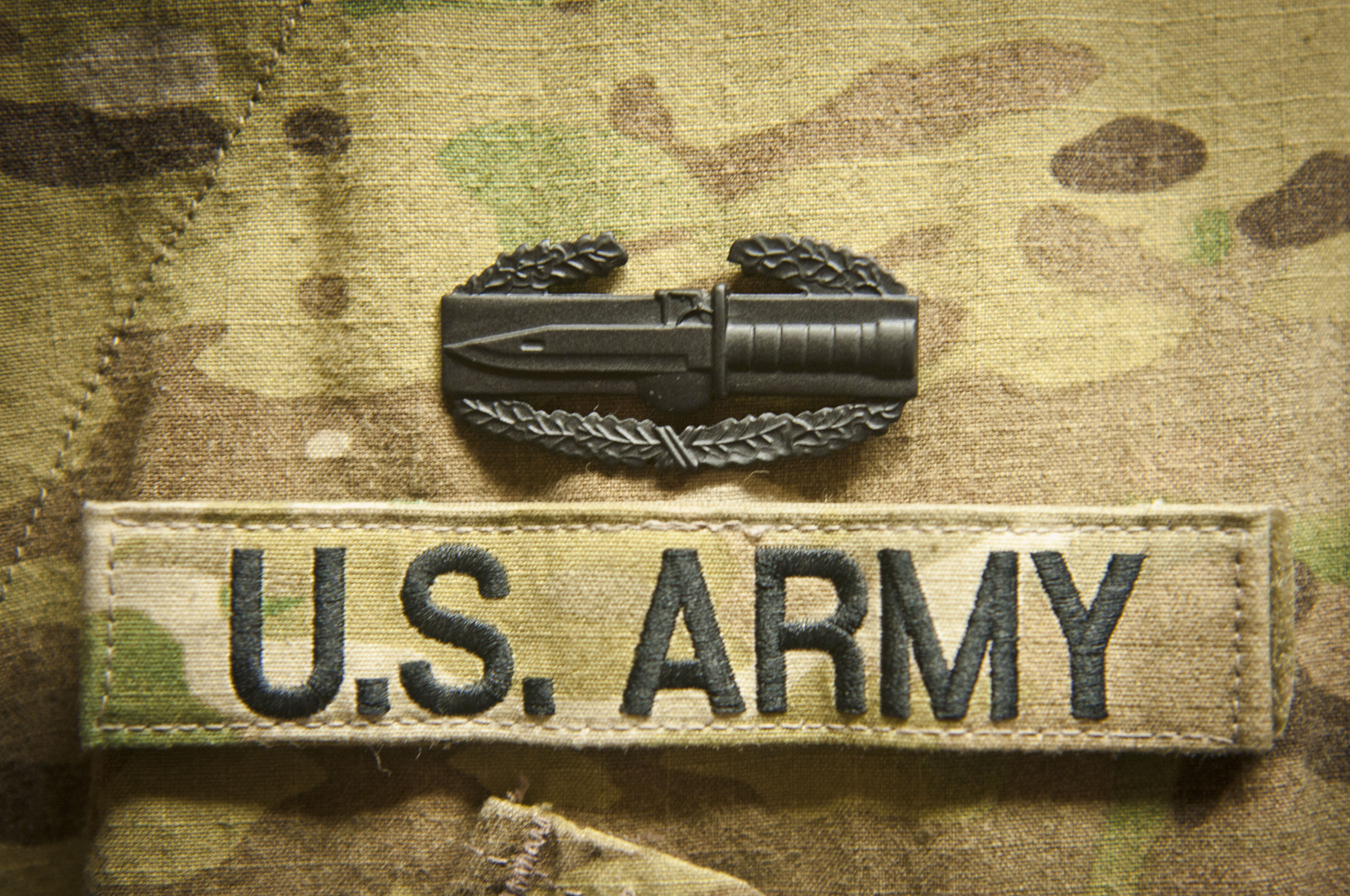
A newly-awarded CAB pinned onto a soldier's Army Combat Uniform blouse; when worn the CAB is worn on the left side of a jacket, shirt, or blouse.

The emblem features both an M9 bayonet and M67 grenade. A silver badge 2 inches (5.08 cm) in width overall consisting of an oak wreath supporting a rectangle bearing a bayonet surmounting a grenade, all silver. In comparison to the CIB, the CAB has a silver rectangle backing rather than blue, and the CAB is 1 inch shorter in length than the CIB. Second and subsequent award of the CAB will be indicated by superimposing one and two stars respectively, centered at the top of the badge between the points of the oak wreath; one star for the second award and two stars for the third award. However, like the CIB and CMB, only one can be awarded per "qualifying period;" as defined in AR 600-8-22. When worn, the CAB is worn on the left side of a jacket or blouse. On combat uniforms it is worn on the blouse above the "U.S. ARMY" nametape and on dress and service uniforms it is worn on the shirt or jacket above any ribbons and medals.

=== Wear by other services ===
Since 2013, U.S. Navy sailors who were formerly soldiers in the U.S. Army and were awarded the CAB cannot wear it on their uniform though they may convert it to the Combat Action Ribbon by submitting a request to the Chief of Naval Operations through their commanding officer. If said sailors were awarded the CIB however, approval is only necessary by the commanding officer. U.S. Marine Corps personnel who were formerly U.S. Army soldiers and were awarded the CAB cannot convert it to a CAR, though if they were awarded the CIB or CMB they can, by submitting a request to their commanding officer. United States Air Force Airmen are authorized to wear the Combat Action Badge on their uniform if awarded. The CAB does not convert into the Air Force Combat Action Medal as the criteria required for the AFCAM is more stringent.

Multiple awards Although no periods are determined for multiple awards, TIOH has designed up to four awards of the Combat Action Badge.

CAB 2x Award

CAB 3x Award

CAB 4x Award

== Master Combat Action Badge ==
Metal, full-color Master Combat Action Badge

In mid-2025 "master combat badges" were introduced, specifically the Master Combat Infantryman Badge (MCIB), Master Combat Medical Badge (MCMB), and Master Combat Action Badge (MCAB). The badges represent those who have earned both a combat badge (Combat Infantryman Badge (CIB), Combat Medical Badge (CMB), or CAB) and an expert badge (Expert Infantryman Badge (EIB), Expert Field Medical Badge (EFMB), or Expert Soldier Badge (ESB)). The "master badges" appear identical to their respective combat badges, replacing the silver wreaths on the full-color metal badges with gold wreaths; subdued pin-on badges and sew-on badges would see their black wreaths also replaced with gold. Soldiers that had earned a combat badge but a "separate" expert badge (a CIB and an EFMB, for example) would wear the master badge aligning with their combat badge (in the case of a CIB and an EFMB, the awardee would wear the MCIB). In March 2025, the Army confirmed the new "master combat" badges would be available via Army & Air Force Exchange Service by 21 March 2025.

Multiple awards
Although no periods are determined for multiple awards, TIOH has designed up to four awards of the Master Combat Action Badge.

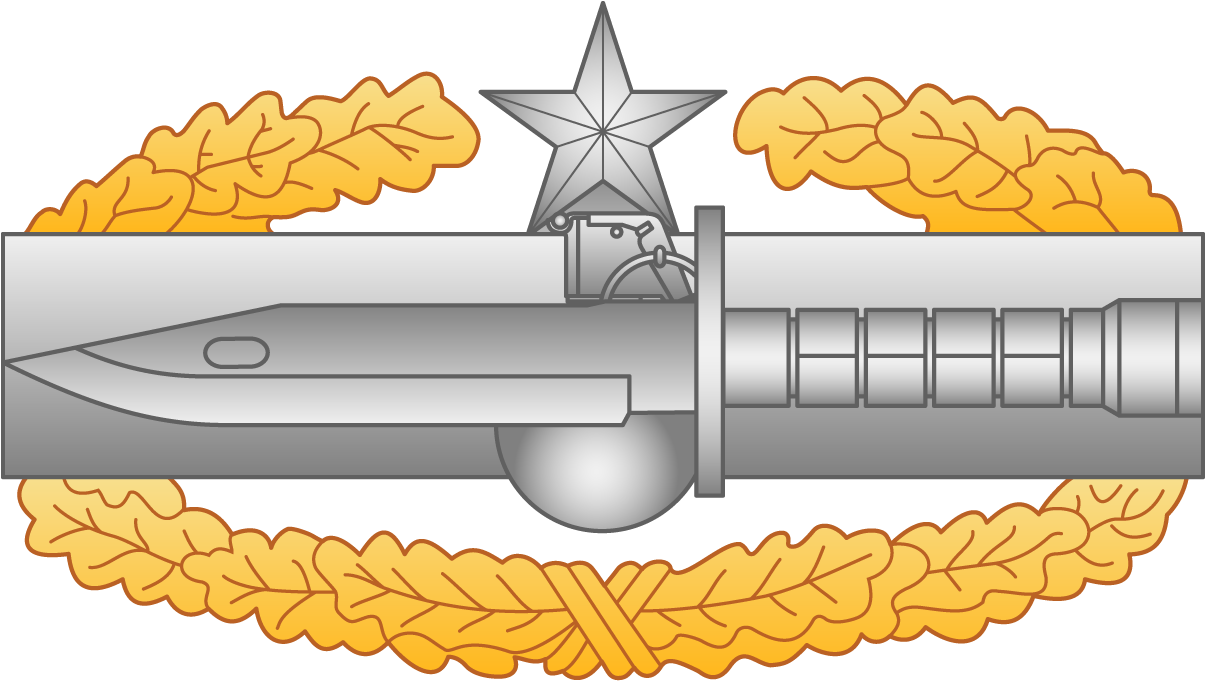
MCAB 2x

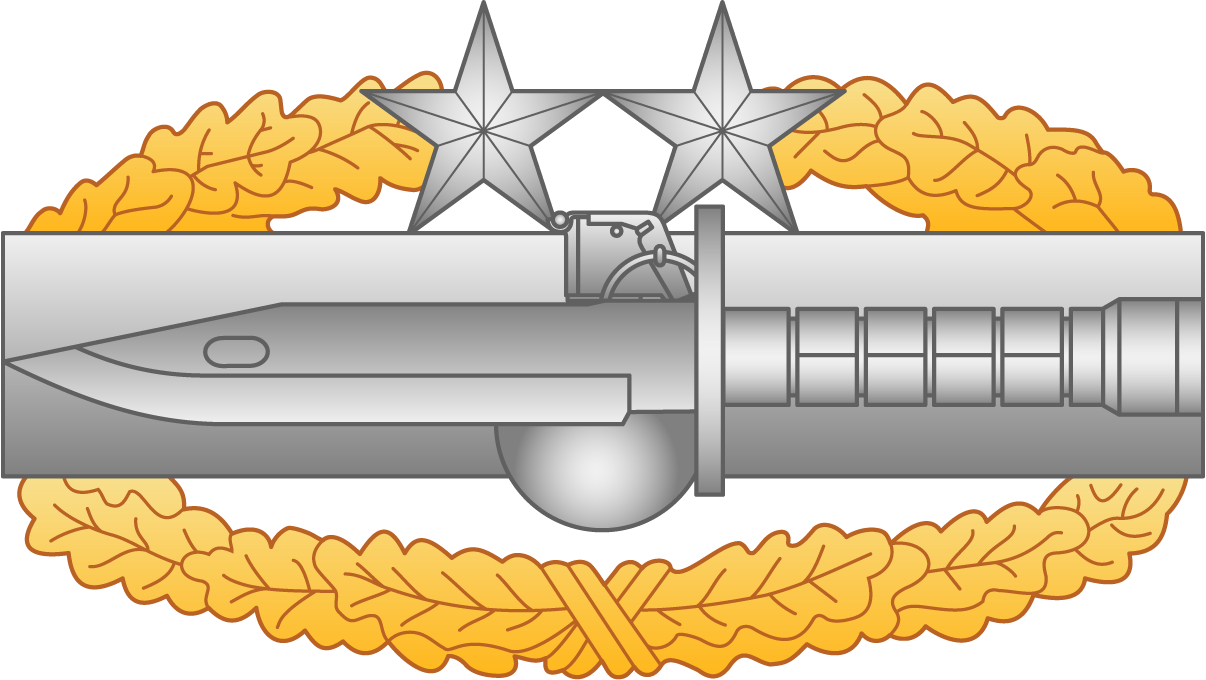
MCAB 3x

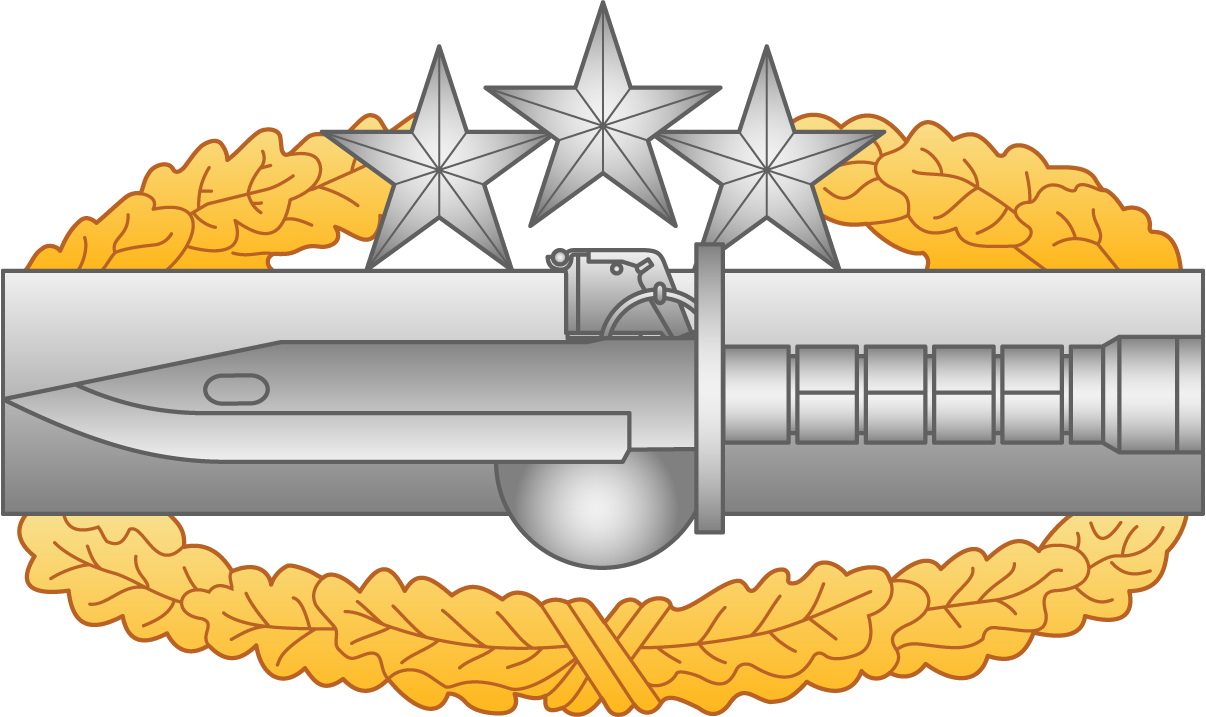
MCAB 4x

== See also ==
- Air Force Combat Action Medal (USAF equivalent)
- Combat Action Ribbon (USN, USMC, and USCG equivalent)
- Expert Soldier Badge

== Bibliography ==
- Newman, Mark T. (17 January 2013). "REVISED ELIGIBILITY CRITERIA FOR AWARD OF THE COMBAT ACTION RIBBON (CAR) AND UPDATED COORDINATING INSTRUCTIONS". Washington, D.C.: United States Marine Corps. Archived from the original on 2016-12-13.
