= Expert Field Medical Badge =

- U.S. Army Expert Field Medical Badge
- Type: Badge
- Awarded for: Completion of all Expert Field Medical Badge requirements.
- Presented by: United States Army
- Eligibility: U.S. Military Medical personnel and North Atlantic Treaty Organization (NATO) military medical personal.
- Status: Currently awarded
- Established: June 18, 1965

Precedence
- Next (higher): Combat Medical Badge
- Equivalent: Expert Infantryman Badge; Expert Soldier Badge
- Next (lower): Parachutist Badges
- Related: Combat Infantryman Badge and Combat Medical Badge

The Expert Field Medical Badge (EFMB) is a United States Army special skills badge first created on June 18, 1965. This badge is the non-combat equivalent of the Combat Medical Badge (CMB) and is awarded to U.S. military personnel and North Atlantic Treaty Organization (NATO) military personnel who successfully complete a set of qualification tests, including both written and performance portions. The EFMB is known for its adherence to its testing standards and, as such, requires strict attention to detail from candidates in order to receive a "GO" on its combat testing lanes. The pass rate for FY 2017 was 7%, making the EFMB one of the most difficult and prestigious Army special skill badges to earn.

Any Military Occupational Specialty (MOS) may attempt to earn the badge. However, the wear of the badge is only authorized when a service member is currently serving or has served in a medical-series MOS during the time that the service member earned it. The infantry equivalent of the Expert Field Medical Badge is the Expert Infantryman Badge (EIB). The MOS 18D Special Forces Medical Sergeant, are only authorized to earn the EFMB as an expert skill badge, and they are not authorized to earn the EIB, but are authorized to wear the CIB if awarded.

As of 2025, personnel who have been awarded both the EFMB (or any "expert" badge) and the CMB are authorized to wear the Master Combat Medical Badge; otherwise, the CMB and EFMB may not be worn together.

== Current badge requirements (as of 2022) ==
Physical Fitness Requirements EFMB no longer requires Soldiers to take the ACFT. Now, according to Maj. Andrey Tsepelev, "Soldiers must now complete 15 burpees, 15 rowers, a 400-meter run, and a 50-meter drag of a 160-pound Sked."

M4 Basic Marksmanship qualification
Qualify "expert" within the last 12 months.
Current CPR certification
Comprehensive Written Test
80 multiple choice questions; 75% to pass. There are four references for the written test: Unit Field Sanitation Team (ATP 4-25.12), Medical Support to Detainee Operations (ATP 4-02.46), Soldier's Manual of Common Tasks (STP 21-1-SMCT), and Soldier's Manual and Trainer's Guide, MOS 68W Health Care Specialist (STP 8-68W13-SM-TG).
Land Navigation
Day and night land navigation courses. The candidate must be able to locate three out of four assigned points. The candidate is given three hours each during the day and night to complete the task.
Combat Testing Lane 1

- Disassemble, assemble, and perform a functions check on an M4 or M4A1 Carbine (or M16 Rifle)
- Move under direct fire
- Correct malfunction of an M4 Carbine or M16-series Rifle
- Perform a Tactical Combat Casualty Care patient assessment
- Evacuate casualties using one-person carries or drags
- Control bleeding using a tourniquet
- Control bleeding using a hemostatic device
- Control bleeding using dressings
- Initiate a saline lock and intravenous infusion
- Initiate treatment for hypovolemic shock and prevent hypothermia
- React to indirect fire
- Triage casualties
- Insert nasopharyngeal airway
- Treat a penetrating chest wound
- Perform needle chest decompression
- Treat an open head injury
- Treat an open abdominal wound
- Immobilize a suspected fracture of the arm
- Treat lacerations, contusions, and extrusions of the eye
- Prepare a Tactical Combat Casualty Care (TCCC) Card
- Evacuate casualties using two-person carries or drags
- Load casualties onto ground evacuation platform (M996, M997, or M113)

Combat Testing Lane 2

- Disassemble, assemble, and perform a functions check on an M9 Pistol
- React to an UXO or possible IED
- Submit Explosive Hazard Spot Report
- Protect yourself from chemical/biological contamination using your assigned protective mask
- Decontaminate yourself using chemical decontamination kits
- Protect yourself from CBRN injury/contamination with Joint Services Lightweight Integrated Suit Technology (JSLIST) chemical protective ensemble
- Perform self-aid for mild nerve agent poisoning
- Submit NBC 1 Report
- Protect yourself from chemical or biological injury/contamination when removing Mission Oriented Protective Posture using JSLIST
- Store the M40-series protective mask with/without hood
- Load casualties onto nonstandard vehicle (5-ton M-1085, M-1093, or 2 ½-ton M-1081)
- Load casualties onto nonstandard vehicle (2 ½-ton, 6x6 or 5-ton, 6x6, Cargo Truck)
- Load casualties onto nonstandard vehicle (1 ¼-ton, 4x4, M998)

Combat Testing Lane 3

- Move over, through, or around obstacles
- Evacuate casualties using litter carries
- Extricate casualties from a vehicle
- Evacuate a casualty using a SKED litter
- Load casualties onto ground evacuation platform (Stryker medical evacuation vehicle [MEV] M1113)
- Load casualties onto a UH-60 helicopter
- Load casualties onto a HH-60L helicopter
- Establish a helicopter landing point
- Assemble and operate SINCGARS or SINCGARS (ASIP)
- Load FH/COMSEC data and conduct radio check using SINCGARS or SINGCARS (ASIP)
- Prepare and transmit a MEDEVAC request (using secure mode radio)

Forced road march
12-mile road march with a standard fighting load to be completed in under three hours. The candidate may not sling his/her assigned weapon or take off any of his/her worn equipment at any time during the road march. The candidate must complete the road march with the assigned gear and equipment from start to finish. An inspection of the candidate's equipment is conducted at the end of the road march. This is the final task that the candidate must complete; successful completion is followed by the graduation ceremony and badge presentation.

== Previous test requirements (before 2008) ==
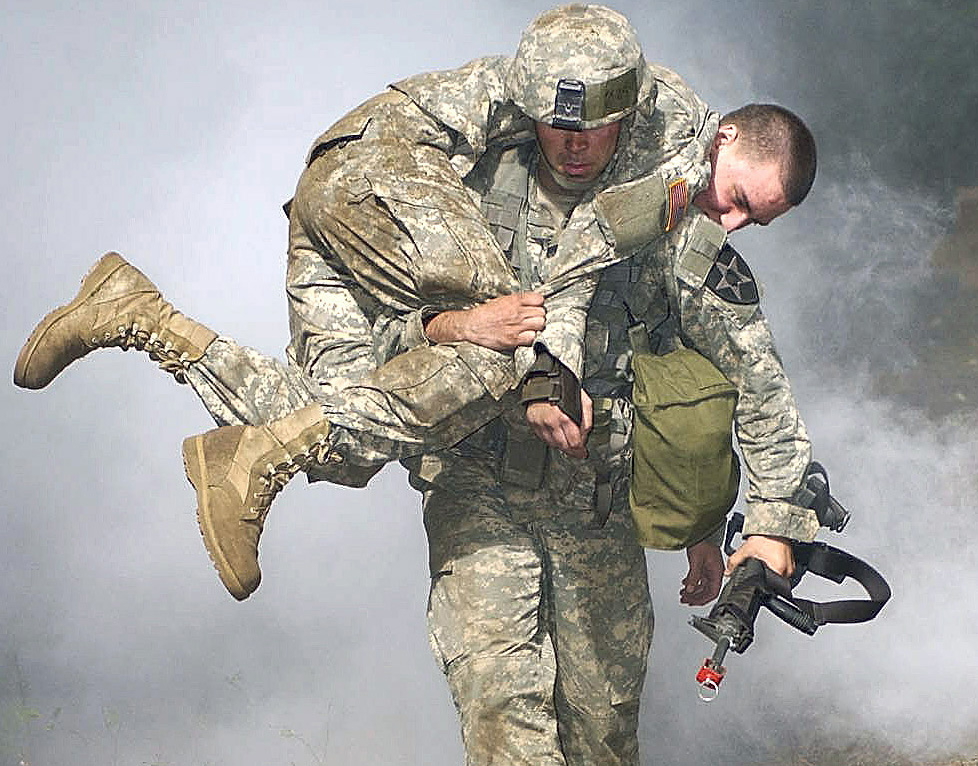
Part "Evacuation of Sick and Wounded"

Comprehensive Written Test
100 multiple choice questions; 75% to pass.
Army Physical Fitness Test
Pass to standard.
M16 Weapons Qualification
Pass to standard within last 12 months.
Land Navigation
Day and night land navigation courses.
Forced Road March
12-mile road march with a standard fighting load to be completed in three hours.
Litter Obstacle Course
Done as a 4-man team with candidates graded individually.
Lane testing
Tasks graded individually but lanes are pass/fail.

- Communications: Competency with field radios and radio techniques. "Prepare and transmit a MEDEVAC request" must be one of the three of four tasks passed in order to receive an overall "GO" for the lane.
- Survival: Demonstrate knowledge of survival skills in an NBC environment and combat situations including use of the M16 series rifle.
- Emergency Medical Treatment: Demonstrate treatment of various wounds similar to those in a combat situation.
- Evacuation of Sick and Wounded: Demonstrate evacuation techniques utilizing vehicles and manual carries.
- Cardiopulmonary Resuscitation (CPR): Demonstrate proficiency in CPR using the one-person method.

In summary, current requirements differ from previous requirements with the addition of the M9 Pistol for survival tasks, CPR card certification in lieu of demonstrating CPR proficiency, and the reorganization of the lanes into a combat scenario.

== EFMB pass / fail rates for FY98 to FY01 ==
FY 01 EFMB test pass rates (overall EFMB test pass rate 16%)

Written Test – 55% Day Land Navigation – 80% Night Land Navigation – 72% Communications – 82% Survival – 95% Emergency Medical Treatment – 73 % Evacuation – 90% Litter Obstacle Course – 96 % CPR – 85% 12 Mile Road March – 86%

FY 00 EFMB test pass rates (overall EFMB test pass rate 18%)

Written Test -66% Day Land Navigation – 83% Night Land Navigation – 63% Communications – 78% Survival – 94% Emergency Medical Treatment -81 % Evacuation – 89% Litter Obstacle Course -97 % CPR -85% 12 Mile Road March – 91%

FY 99 EFMB test pass rates (overall EFMB test pass rate 21%)

Written Test – 51% Day Land Navigation – 82% Night Land Navigation – 80% Communications – 86% Survival – 92% Emergency Medical Treatment – 81% Evacuation – 90% Litter Obstacle Course – 89% CPR – 87% 12 Mile Road March – 90%

FY 98 EFMB test pass rates (overall EFMB test pass rate 21%)

Written Test – 63% Day Land Navigation – 81% Night Land Navigation – 76% Communications – 86% Survival – 91% Emergency Medical Treatment – 74% Evacuation – 87% Litter Obstacle Course – 91% CPR – 84% 12 Mile Road March – 91%

== Master Medical Badge ==
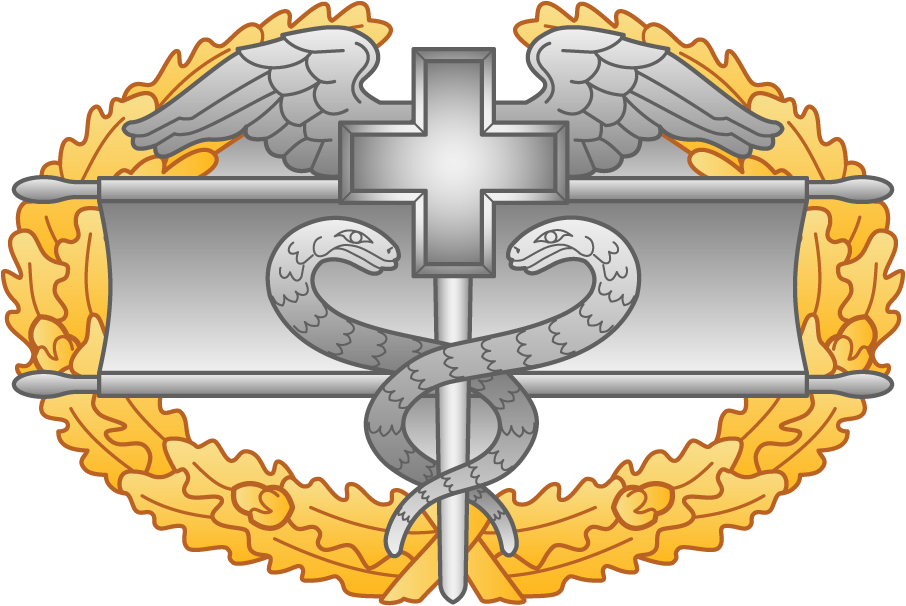
Master Combat Medical Badge

In late 2024 it was reported that "master combat badges" would debut in Spring 2025; the Master Infantryman Badge, Master Medical Badge, and Master Soldier Badge. The badges would represent those who have earned both a combat badge (CIB, CMB, or CAB) and an expert badge (EIB, EFMB, or ESB). The proposed "master badges" are alleged to appear identical to their respective combat badges, replacing the silver wreaths on the full-color metal badges with gold wreaths; subdued pin-on badges and sew-on badges would see their black wreaths also replaced with gold. Soldiers that had earned a combat badge but a "separate" expert badge (a CIB and an EFMB, for example) would wear the master badge aligning with their combat badge (in the case of a CIB and an EFMB, the awardee would wear the Master Infantryman Badge). As of November 2026, no official announcement has been made concerning the badges.
