= Expert Infantryman Badge =

Special skills badge of the United States Army

- U.S. Army Expert Infantryman Badge
- Type: Special Skill Group 1 Badge
- Presented by: United States Army
- Eligibility: Recipient must meet Department of the Army-established testing requirements and must possess a military occupational specialty within Career Management Field 11 (Infantry) or 18 (Special Forces), less MOS 18D.
- Status: Currently awarded
- Established: November 11, 1943
- First award: March 29, 1944

Precedence
- Next (higher): Combat Action Badge
- Equivalent: Expert Field Medical Badge; Expert Soldier Badge
- Next (lower): Expert Field Medical Badge
- Related: Combat Infantry Badge and Combat Medic Badge

The Expert Infantryman Badge (EIB) is a special skills badge of the United States Army.

The EIB was created with the CIB by executive order in November 1943 during World War II. Currently, it is awarded to U.S. Army personnel who hold infantry or Special Forces military occupational specialties with the exception of soldiers with the occupational specialty of Special Forces Medical Sergeant (18D). To be awarded the EIB, the soldier must complete a number of prerequisites and pass a battery of graded tests on basic infantry skills.

In 2017, talks about a similar badge were being discussed for soldiers without the occupation of infantry, medical, or Special Forces were put on the table and in 2019 the army established the Expert Soldier Badge for soldiers who do not qualify for either the EIB or EFMB.

The EIB is a silver and enamel badge, consisting of a 3-inch-wide (76 mm) rectangular bar with an infantry-blue field upon which is superimposed a Springfield Arsenal Musket, Model 1795. Although similar in name and appearance to the Combat Infantryman Badge (CIB), it is a completely different award. While the CIB is awarded to infantry soldiers for participation in ground combat, the EIB is presented for completion of a course of testing designed to demonstrate proficiency in infantry skills.

As of 2025, personnel who have been awarded both the EIB (or any "expert" badge) and the CIB are authorized to wear the Master Combat Infantryman Badge; otherwise, the CIB and EIB may not be worn together.

== Modern requirements (2020s) ==
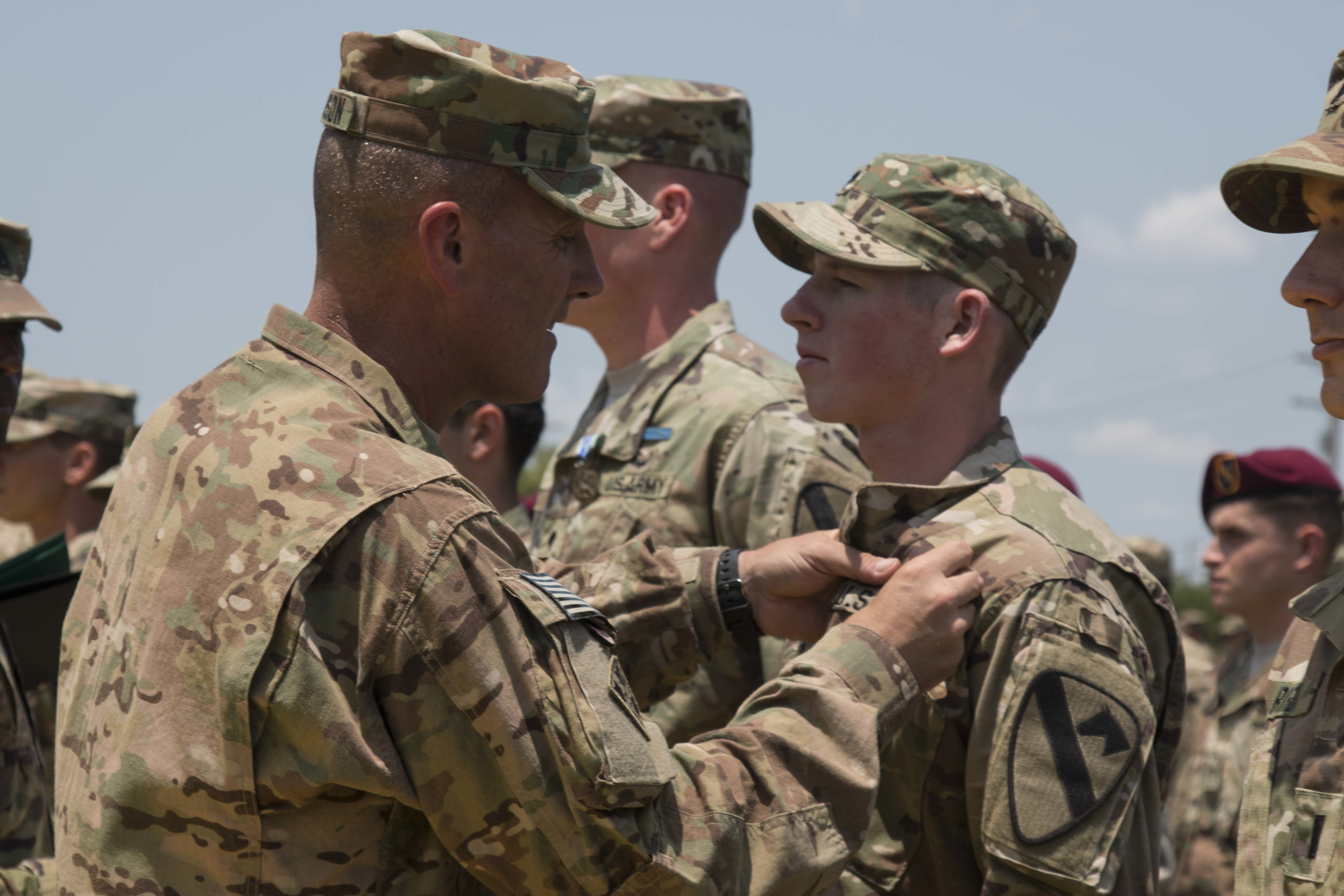
1st Cavalry Division Infantryman gets pinned the EIB 2016.

A primary Military Occupational Specialty (MOS) in Career Management Fields (CMF) 11 (Infantry) or 18 (Special Forces) series, except 18Ds (Special Forces Medical Sergeant).

EIB Physical Fitness Assessment: Each candidate (regardless of sex or age) is required to complete 49 push-ups, 59 sit-ups and finish a 4 mile run in 32 minutes or less.

Land navigation: complete a day and a night land navigation course within a specified timeframe;

Weapon qualification: earn an "expert" qualification on their assigned weapon, typically an M16/M4; in the case of mortarmen (MOS 11C) expert qualification on the mortar is an additional requirement.

Forced foot march: complete a 12-mile foot march, carrying M4/M7 and 35 lb. load + extra gear for a total of up to 70 lbs, within three hours.

Lane or station testing in individual tasks, graded as pass/fail ("GO"/"NO GO"). There are approximately 30–35 stations in this phase. Candidates must pass every station; if they receive a "NO GO" on their first attempt, they have one chance to retest. A second "NO GO" at any station results in a failure for the entire testing phase. Generally there are multiple stations in all the following areas (less common/defunct tasks in italics):

- First Aid
- Chemical, Biological, Radiological, Nuclear (CBRN) procedures
- Call for Fire (indirect fire), CAS (close air support), and Close Combat Attack
- Techniques for movement under fire, camouflage, hand-signaling, range estimation, and reporting contact to higher headquarters
- Communications: competency with ASIP, SINCGARS, MBITR or PRC-152 field radios and procedures
- Map reading: terrain identification, topography, use of military GPS
- Weapons proficiency: load, unload, perform function checks, clear, correct malfunctions, etc. for M9, M16/M4, M203, M249, M240B, M60, M2, Mk 19, AT4, Javelin; employ hand grenades, Claymore, and anti-tank mines
- Proficiency with night vision devices
- Boresighting proficiency

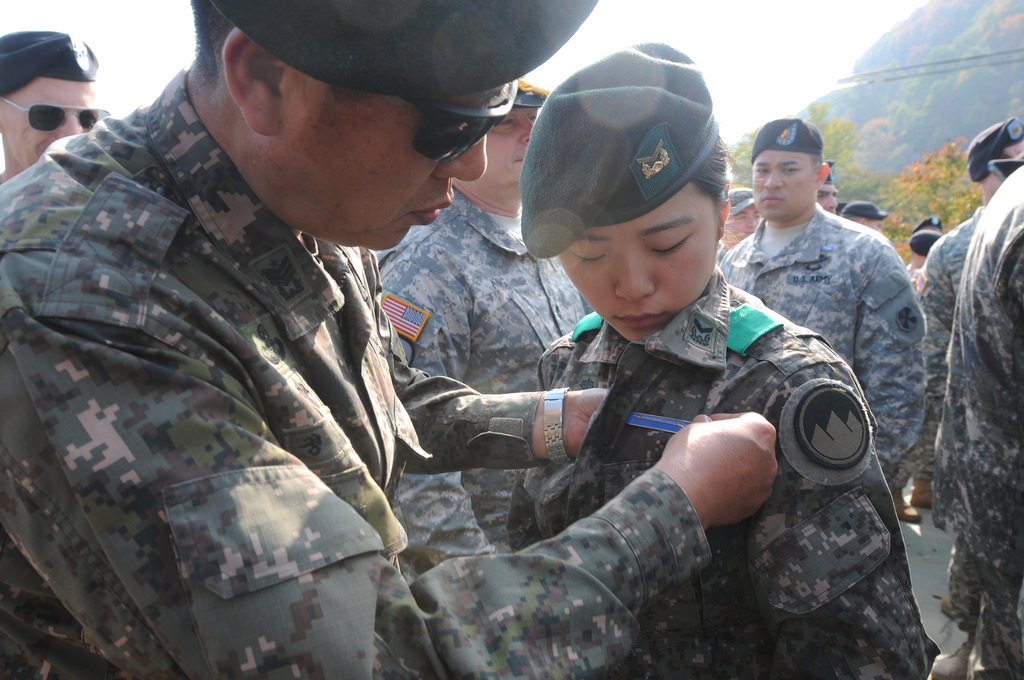
1st female South Korean soldier to earn the EIB in 2014

Foreign militaries are often invited to participate in the EIB when units are overseas or in host nation countries. Countries that have participated in the EIB include Bosnia, Korea, and Poland.

== Terminology and ritual ==
While training in basic skills is a major goal of the EIB program, the EIB institution additionally provides an area of common experience and vocabulary across the infantry in the US Army. This test comes around about once every 2 years to most Infantry units. Those who fail could wait over a year before they have the opportunity to try again. Most likely they will transfer or PCS to another Infantry unit that may or may not be testing that year. Thus, the wait to retest could be longer.

Sociologically, the testing phase especially acts as a rite of passage for many infantrymen. The period of testing usually stretches over several days, with the number of candidates remaining steadily dwindling and pressure similarly increasing. Traditionally, hand grenades (where the candidate has five grenades to hit three different targets) and call for fire are considered the most difficult tests.

There is a specific slang vocabulary associated with EIB testing. Graders at each station usually have EIBs themselves; a badge protector is therefore a particularly difficult grader, perceived to be protecting the status of the award which he holds. Graders typically carry a blue pen to mark "GO"s and a red pen to mark "NO GO"s; to complete the entire phase without a single NO GO is therefore to go true blue. Similarly, if a candidate has one "NO GO” he is said to be blade running; any mistake will eliminate him. Usually if the candidate makes a mistake and time has not run out, the grader will tell the candidate "you still have time remaining", which is a clue that the candidate may have done something wrong. On occasion, the grader will do this to unnerve the candidate even though everything is correct, which completes the rite of passage.
