= Driver and Mechanic Badge =

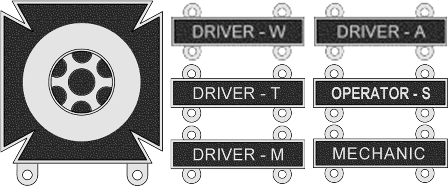
- Type: Badge
- Awarded for: Qualifications to operate and repair military motor vehicles
- Presented by: United States Army
- Eligibility: The Driver and Mechanic Badge is authorized for wear by all qualifying U.S. Army personnel, however group 5 special skill badges are typically not worn by commissioned officers.
- Status: Currently awarded
- Established: July 1942
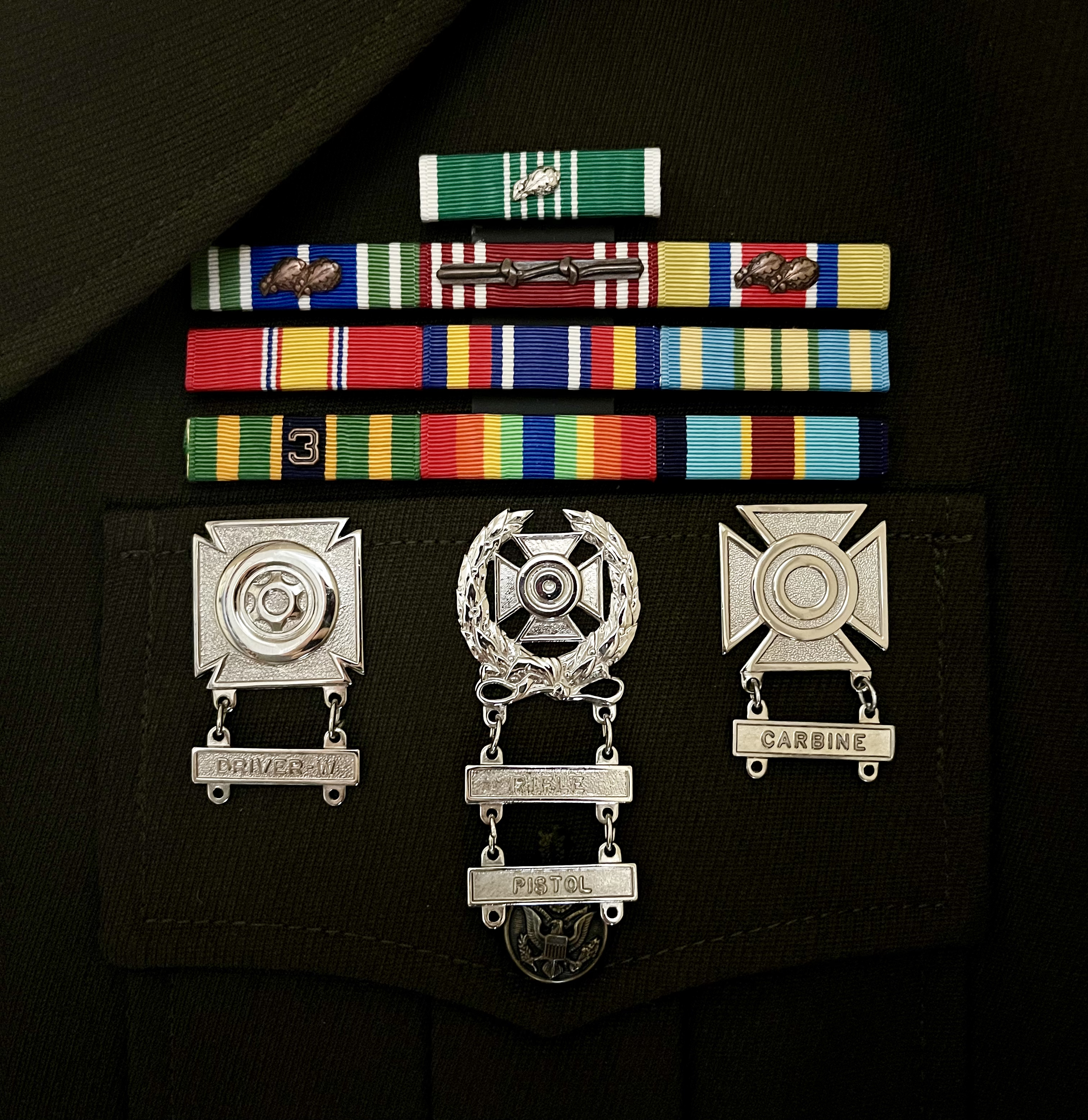
- How the Driver and Mechanic Badge (pictured left) is worn on the Army Green Service Uniform

Precedence
- Next (higher): Parachutist Badge
- Next (lower): Identification badges
- Related: Weapons qualification/competition badges

The Driver and Mechanic Badge is a military special skill badge of the United States Army which was first created in July 1942. The badge is awarded to drivers, mechanics, and special equipment operators to denote the attainment of a high degree of skill in the operation and maintenance of motor vehicles. The badge was originally referred to as the “Motor Vehicle Badge” and adopted its current title of Driver and Mechanic Badge during the Korean War.

The Driver and Mechanic Badge is awarded to soldiers who have received training and have met specific qualification standards to operate or repair military motor vehicles. For example, the Driver and Mechanic Badge for wheeled vehicles requires successful completion of military vehicle operations and maintenance training and be assigned duties and responsibilities as a driver or assistant driver of government vehicles for a minimum of 12 consecutive months and have driven at least 8,000 miles with no vehicle accidents or traffic violations before one can be awarded the badge.

The badge is issued with a number of metal bars, suspended beneath the decoration, which denote the qualification received. The current bars which are issued to the Driver and Mechanic Badge are as follows:

- DRIVER - A (for amphibious vehicles)
- DRIVER - M (for motorcycles)
- DRIVER - T (for tracked vehicles)
- DRIVER - W (for wheeled vehicles)
- MECHANIC (for automotive or allied vehicles)
- OPERATOR - S (for special mechanical equipment)

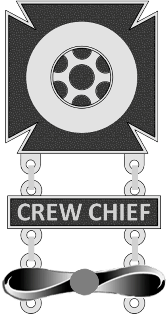
Drawing of former Driver and Mechanic Badge–Aviation Crew Chief

From November 1962 to January 1966, the U.S. Army awarded this badge to Army aviation mechanics and crew chiefs. To distinguish them from other Driver and Mechanic Badges, aviation mechanics had a two-bladed propeller bar that hung suspended beneath the badge, just like the driver bars. Crew chiefs hung two metal bars from the badge, one with "Crew Chief" embossed on a bar followed by the propeller bar. The Driver and Mechanic Badge-Aviation Mechanic and Driver and Mechanic Badge-Crew Chief were replaced by the Army Aircrewman Badge, now known as the Army Aviation Badge.

The Driver and Mechanic Badge is a permanently awarded skill badge and is worn suspended beneath a service member’s standard decorations and to the wearer's right of any Weapons Qualification Badges.
