= Pete "Maverick" Mitchell =

Pete Mitchell
- Top Gun character
- Tom Cruise as Pete "Maverick" Mitchell
- First appearance: Top Gun (1986)
- Created by: Jim Cash; Jack Epps Jr.
- Portrayed by: Tom Cruise

In-universe information
- Full name: Peter Mitchell
- Alias: Maverick
- Titles: Lieutenant (U.S. Navy; Top Gun); Captain (U.S. Navy; Maverick)
- Occupation: United States Naval aviator; Fighter pilot; Test pilot; Flight instructor
- Significant others: Charlotte "Charlie" Blackwood (ex-girlfriend); Penelope "Penny" Benjamin (girlfriend); Tom “Iceman” Kazansky (wingman); Nick "Goose" Bradshaw (Radar Intercept Officer; deceased)
- Relatives: Duke Mitchell (father; deceased)
- Nationality: American

Peter "Maverick" Mitchell is a fictional character and the main protagonist of the Top Gun franchise. He is portrayed by Tom Cruise. The character first appeared in the 1986 film Top Gun, followed by Top Gun: Maverick in 2022.

== Casting ==
Actor Matthew Modine turned down the role of Pete Mitchell because he felt the film's pro-military stance went against his politics. The producers of Top Gun wanted Tom Cruise for the role after seeing him in Risky Business. He was offered the part while he was in London filming Legend, Cruise was reluctant to take the part but director Tony Scott's brother Ridley Scott convinced him to do so.

Cruise was paid $12–14 million to reprise the role in Top Gun: Maverick, which was revised to over $100 million after his share of the film's box office gross.

== Character and background ==
Mitchell was born to naval aviator Duke Mitchell who died in aerial combat in Vietnam on November 5, 1965, and an unidentified mother. Maverick carries a photograph of himself with his father in his wallet. His father flew with Commander Mike "Viper" Metcalf (Tom Skerritt), and Viper and Duke served together aboard the USS Oriskany; Viper witnessed Duke's F-4 Phantom II get shot down.

Maverick is skilled in the use of a motorcycle, using a Kawasaki GPZ900R, also known as the Ninja 900.

In the sequel, Maverick also knows how to mechanically maintain and operate a P-51 Mustang.

== Appearances ==
=== Top Gun ===
In the 1986 film Top Gun, Pete "Maverick" Mitchell, portrayed by Tom Cruise, is a young and charismatic naval aviator. Maverick and his Radar Intercept Officer (RIO) Lieutenant Junior Grade Nick "Goose" Bradshaw (Anthony Edwards), are stationed in the Indian Ocean aboard USS Enterprise and fly the F-14A Tomcat. After being assigned to Top Gun, they meet Commanding Officer Mike "Viper" Metcalf. Before the first day of instruction, Maverick unsuccessfully approaches a woman at a bar. He learns the next day she is an astrophysicist and civilian Top Gun instructor, Charlotte "Charlie" Blackwood (Kelly McGillis). She becomes interested in Maverick upon learning of his inverted maneuver with a MiG-28. However, privately she admires his flying; they begin a romantic relationship. Maverick's main antagonist is naval aviator and fellow Top Gun student Lt. Tom "Iceman" Kazansky, portrayed by Val Kilmer. Ice Man considers Maverick's behavior "foolish," "dangerous," and worse than the enemy, to which Maverick responds, "I am dangerous." Maverick and Iceman, the leading contenders for the Top Gun Trophy, chase an A-4 in Hop 31. Maverick's F-14 flies through Iceman's jet wash and suffers a flameout of both engines, going into an unrecoverable flat spin. Maverick and Goose eject, but Goose slams into the jettisoned aircraft canopy and is killed by the impact. Maverick is guilt-ridden and considers quitting before seeking advice from Viper, who flew with Maverick’s father during the Vietnam War. During combat in a rescue operation following his graduation from Top Gun, Maverick fends off an attack by six MiG-28s, destroying three and assisting Iceman with another. The remaining MiG's fly away, concluding a successful rescue operation.He is eventually given the choice of any assignment; Maverick chooses to return to Top Gun as an instructor. He and Charlie reunite at a bar in Miramar. The song “You've Lost That Lovin' Feelin'” plays over the credits.

He is often seen wearing a leather G-1 military flight jacket, white T-shirt, blue 501 Levi Jeans, with cowboy boots, aviator sunglasses, and a flight suit, which adds to his iconic and rugged image as a fighter pilot. Maverick's look echoes the cool and rebellious nature of his character, making him one of the most recognizable figures in the film.

=== Top Gun: Maverick ===
Thirty years after the events of the first film, Mitchell is a decorated test pilot whose repeated insubordination has kept him from flag rank. His style of clothing is similar to the previous film with the addition of a Sage-green CWU-36/P zip-up flight jacket with styled collar. Maverick's friend and former Top Gun rival Tom "Iceman" Kazansky (Val Kilmer), now Commander U.S. Pacific Fleet (COMPACFLT), has assigned Maverick to the Top Gun school at NAS North Island. Maverick reunites with former girlfriend Penny Benjamin (Jennifer Connelly), to whom he reveals that he promised Rooster's dying mother that Rooster would not become a pilot. Over the course of the film, Maverick shoots down two Su-57 enemy aircraft which, in addition to the three MiGs he shot down in the original, earn him the status of the US Navy's first F-14 flying ace.

== In popular culture ==
The character was spoofed in the 1991 parody film Hot Shots!, in which the protagonist, Lieutenant Sean "Topper" Harley, played by Charlie Sheen, represents Maverick.

United States Navy pilot Dale Snodgrass was called "The Real Top Gun" or the real "Maverick"

== Reception ==
With the release of Top Gun, the character has been credited as one of Cruise's most iconic roles and one of many that helped launch him into Hollywood stardom. Cruise's performance in Top Gun: Maverick received widespread critical acclaim, more so than the first film, with some reviewers saying it is one of the best of his career. Taksam Mukherjee of Firstpost wrote that Cruise "wants nothing less than our jaws on the floor. Proving that no amount of multiverse films or superstar cameos will replace the blood, sweat and adrenaline of an actor legitimately trying to push the boundaries of filmmaking. We can be rest assured that if it's a Tom Cruise film, he will not let us down."

== Video games ==
Maverick is a central figure as an instructor at TOP GUN in Top Gun: Hard Lock, a combat flight simulator game, developed by Headstrong Games and published by 505 Games for PlayStation 3, Xbox 360, and Microsoft Windows in 2012.
