= Sukajan =

Blouson jacket inspired by baseball jackets, embroidery, silk and Japanese influences

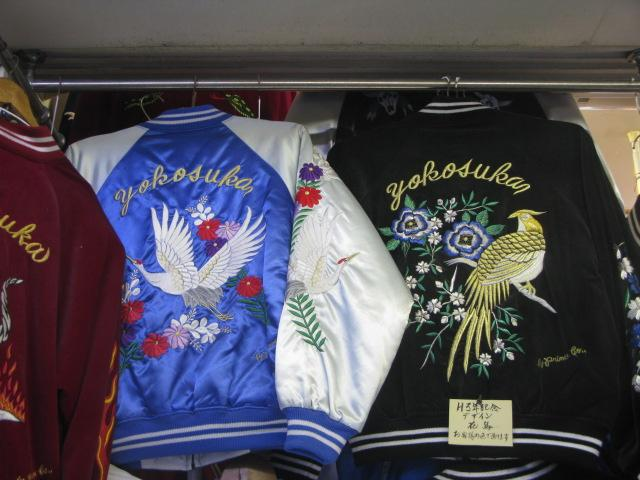
- Various sukajan on display
- Type: Jacket / male/unisex
- Material: Diverse, usually satin material
- Place of origin: Japan
- Introduced: Post WWII

A sukajan (スカジャン), also known as souvenir jacket or tour jacket, is a type of satin blouse jacket often embroidered with orientalist motifs that originated in post-World War II occupied Japan.

Modeled after varsity jackets, they were originally a souvenir created by Japanese craftspeople for American servicemen stationed in Japan. The sukajan was later adopted by Japanese working-class youth culture as an act of rebellion, and has since endured in popularity both in Japan and abroad.

== History ==
=== 1950s: Post WWII origins ===
The sukajan originated in post-war occupied Japan (1945–1952) around the CFAY naval base in Yokosuka.

Originally, sukajan were meant as a souvenir from a tour of duty, hence their other popular names: souvenir and tour jackets. Initially they were made on commission, either by embroidering the servicemen's own military flight jackets, or from scratch. Modeled after bomber, varsity, and baseball jackets, they were crafted using lustrous materials like rayon and, more commonly, silk. When silk was not available, as was often the case due to silk shortages in Japan at the time, nylon, acetate, and even leftover parachute silk were used instead.

Noticing their popularity, Kosho & Co.—a textile trading company later renamed to TOYO Enterprise—started mass-producing sukajan and selling them at street stalls and post exchanges, making 95% of all sukajan produced in the immediate post-war period. The jackets were produced in the nearby towns of Kiryū and Ashikaga by skilled artisans from Japan's traditional kimono industry, which had been disrupted by the war.

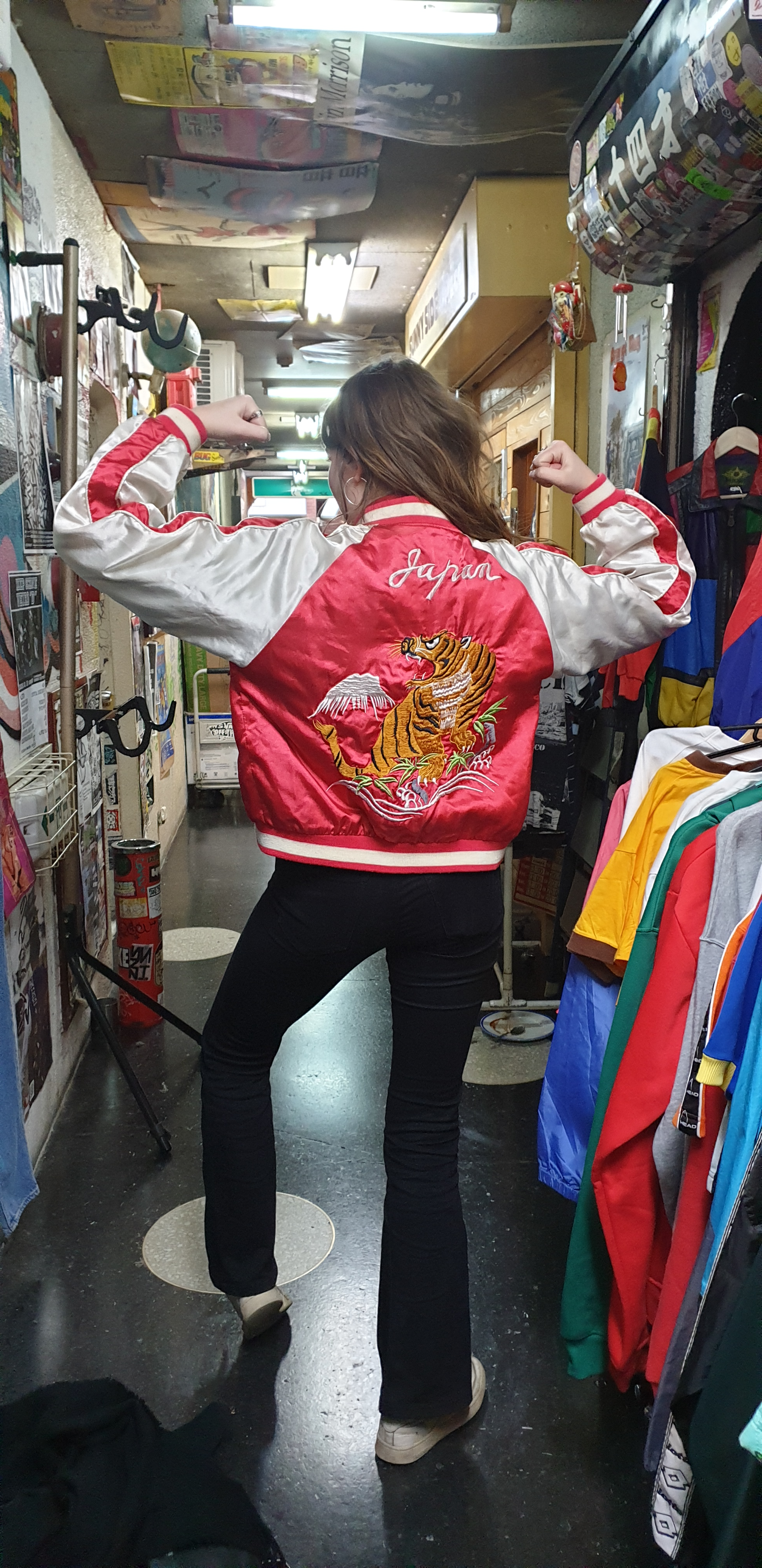
A sukajan embroidered with a tiger and Mount Fuji

==== Embroidery ====
Unlike the embroidered kimonos that American servicemen purchased as souvenirs for women back home—which exclusively featured traditionally feminine motifs like Japanese flowers, especially wisteria, chrysanthemums, and cherry blossoms—sukajan were designed specifically for the servicemen themselves, a fact reflected in their bolder imagery, which typically included:

- Fierce animals from Asian mythology and art (tigers, dragons or koi)
- American military insignia or iconography
- Maps of Japan or battle locations
- Eagles, fighter planes, or Native American motifs
- Text commemorating specific military units or tours of duty
- Mount Fuji

The embroidered designs were typically prominently displayed on the back, with additional motifs appearing on the chest and sleeves. The fusion of Eastern and Western elements reflected the garment's transcultural origins and was a deliberate form of self-orientalism, enacted as a marketing strategy in the context of Japan's difficult post-war economic recovery.

=== 1960s: The sukaman ===
During the 1960s, the sukajan became associated with Japanese working-class youth culture, particularly through the sukaman movement. The term "sukaman" emerged by combining "Yokosuka" (the city) and manbo (マンボ), the latter being a slang term for Japanese delinquent teens (as mambo dancing was popular among them). The movement was initially composed of Japanese teens from Yokosuka who learned style tips from American soldiers and imitated their fashion choices. Yokosuka teens loved the sukajan, and were the ones to coin the term by combining "Yokosuka" and the Japanese pronunciation of "jumper" (ジャンパー, janpā).

While the popularity of sukajan was initially limited to the areas near the naval base, it skyrocketed after sukajan were donned by the main character of the 1961 Japanese film Pigs and Battleships, which follows the misadventures of a wanna-be yakuza around the naval base and its nearby red light district, which further increased their association with delinquency.

By 1967, sukajan spread to Tokyo and beyond thanks to the sukaman movement becoming more popular. They were often worn as an act of rebellion against the mainstream Ivy style favored by middle-class youth.

=== 1970s: Vietnam war ===
The sukajan tradition evolved through subsequent military conflicts in Asia, particularly during the Vietnam war. It was more common for those soldiers to commission embroidery directly on their military-issued clothing, and they featured more serious, vulgar, and somber designs, like battle maps, personal details of service, or mottos like "When I die I’ll go to heaven because I’ve served my time in hell". These garments are sometimes referred to as Vietjan (ベトジャン).

== Cultural impact ==
The sukajan has experienced several revivals in mainstream fashion, becoming a significant trend in global fashion in the 2010s, with both vintage pieces and new reproductions being sought after. To this day, traditional manufacturers like TOYO Enterprise continue to reproduce sukajan using historical designs and techniques, while many fashion brands have created their own interpretations.

Celebrities like Mick Jagger, Kanye West, Katy Perry, Wiz Khalifa, Kyary Pamyu Pamyu and Hideo Kojima (among others) have worn sukajan, contributing to their popularity.

In the film Drive (2011), Ryan Gosling wears an ivory quilted sukajan with a large golden scorpion on the back. The inspiration for the jacket came from one of Gosling's own sukajan, but the jacket featured in the movie was custom made, with 13 copies used throughout the movie. The ivory scorpion sukajan became iconic and, since the original was not commercially available, it led to numerous replicas and imitations.

== See also ==
- Flight jacket
- Perfecto

== Sources ==
- Cheang, Sarah; de Greef, Erica; Takagi, Yoko (2021). Rethinking Fashion Globalization. Bloomsbury Visual Arts. ISBN 9781350180062.
- Kramer, Elizabeth (1 April 2020). "New vintage – new history? The sukajan (souvenir jacket) and its fashionable reproduction". International Journal of Fashion Studies. 7 (1): 25–47. doi:10.1386/infs_00015_1.
- Marx, W. David (2015). Ametora: How Japan Saved American Style. Basic Books. ISBN 9780465073870.
