= Pilot jacket =

Pilot jacket may refer to:

- A-2 jacket, associated with U.S. Army pilots of World War II
- Cooper A-2 jacket, a type of leather jacket used by the U.S. Air Force in World War II
- Flight jacket, the umbrella term for any jacket used by pilot or in the style of such
- MA-1 bomber jacket, developed for use in high-altitude jets, and very popular as civilian adaptations
- Pea coat, the heavy wool overcoat traditionally worn as a navy uniform worldwide
