= Leather jacket =

Jacket made of leather

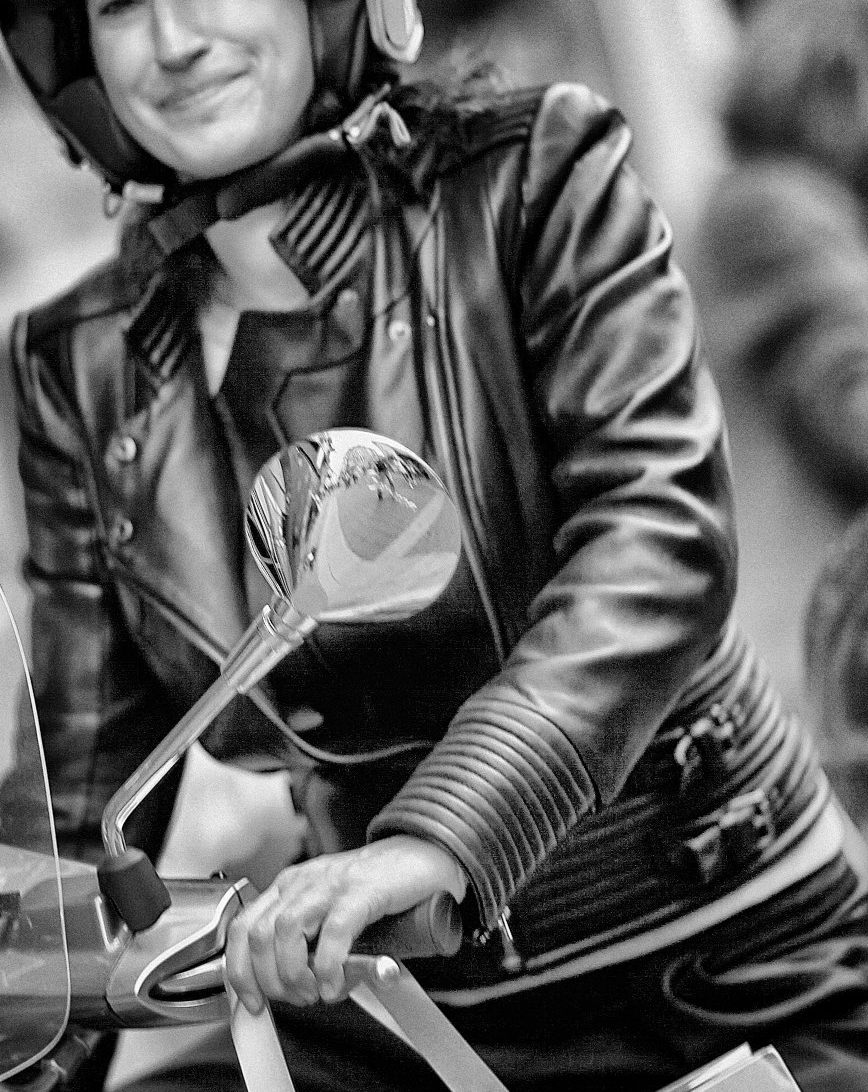
Woman in leather jacket on a Vespa scooter in Belgium

A leather jacket is a jacket or coat made from the tanned skin of various animals. The leather material is typically dyed black or various shades of brown, but a wide range of colors are possible. Leather jackets are designed for many purposes, and specific styles have been associated with both aesthetic and protective functions for aviators and motorcyclists, as well as subcultures such as greasers, punks, goths, and metalheads.

== History ==
As early as the eighteenth century, leather jackets made of buckskin in the style of colonial military coats were crafted by Native Americans and traded with European colonists.

In the early twentieth century, Russian Bolsheviks commonly wore leather jackets, which became a quasi-uniform for commissars during the Russian Civil War, and later for the members of the Cheka. Yakov Sverdlov allegedly initiated this practice.

One of the first modern leather jackets, the type A1 flight jacket, was created by Chapal in 1925 and became standard United States military issue in 1927. During the Second World War, these designs were updated with then-recently invented zippers and heavy insulation, often incorporating sheepskin and an inner layer of intact fleece, to protect bomber pilots from exposure to extreme climate conditions at high altitudes. These garments became known as "bomber jackets". Motorcycle police and dispatch riders also adopted short leather coats as protective equipment. Black leather jackets were worn by German officers and aviators during both World War I and World War II.

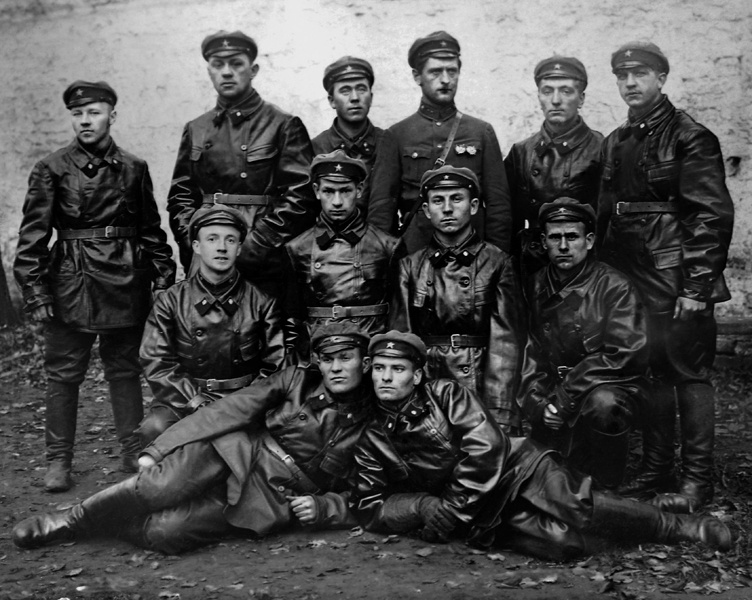
Leather jackets were commonly worn in the military and intelligence services of the early Soviet Union (pictured is a group of OGPU troops, c. 1929)

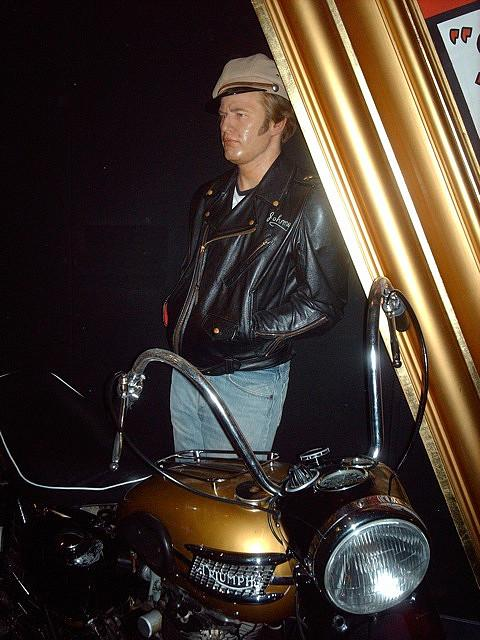
Marlon Brando - The Wild One (Madame Tussaud's)

Inspired by the 1947 Hollister riot, the 1953 film The Wild One starred Marlon Brando as Johnny Strabler in a Perfecto motorcycle jacket. This film brought outlaw biker culture into public light and solidified the rebellious connotations of the leather jacket. The Wild One has been credited as a major factor in the adoption of leather jackets by American youth through the early 1960s, including both middle-class suburban teens and working-class members of the rebellious greaser subculture, despite bans by schools across the country and regardless of whether the wearer rode a motorcycle. The film also played a role in the development of leather subculture through the rise of gay motorcycle clubs. As their popularity increased throughout the following decade, leather jackets were worn by celebrities like James Dean, Elvis Presley, Eddie Cochran, and The Beatles.

Black leather jackets were a part of the uniform of the Black Panther Party in the 1960s, introduced by founder Huey P. Newton. Their ready availability made them a convenient way for both men and women to reflect the organization's militarism, push back against gender roles, and contrast with the suits and professional dress (dubbed "Sunday's Best") of other Civil Rights Movement leaders.

From the 1970s through the early 1980s, greaser subculture was depicted in the television series Happy Days, which was set in the 1950s and 1960s and featured The Fonz wearing a leather jacket (now housed in the National Museum of American History). The character is credited with both helping to popularize the jacket and contributing to its reinvention as a jacket for many types of people, not just rebels. At the same time, the early punk movement developed both denim and leather battle jackets inspired by both the personalization of flight jackets by World War II pilots and the identifying patches sewn onto leather vests and jackets by members of outlaw motorcycle clubs. With the addition of decorations like paint, studs, rivets, and safety pins, leather jackets remained heavily associated with punk through the 1980s and were also adopted by heavy metal music fans. Musicians like the Ramones and the Sex Pistols further increased the visibility of leather jackets as an element of punk style.

In the 1990s, a variety of leather jacket patterned after an eight ball, referred to as an eight-ball jacket, was briefly trendy. It occasionally resurfaces as a retro fashion item.

In the 21st century, leather jackets are still worn by motorcyclists, though many wearers come from more conventional backgrounds and seek association with rebellion through their style of dress.

== Material & manufacture ==
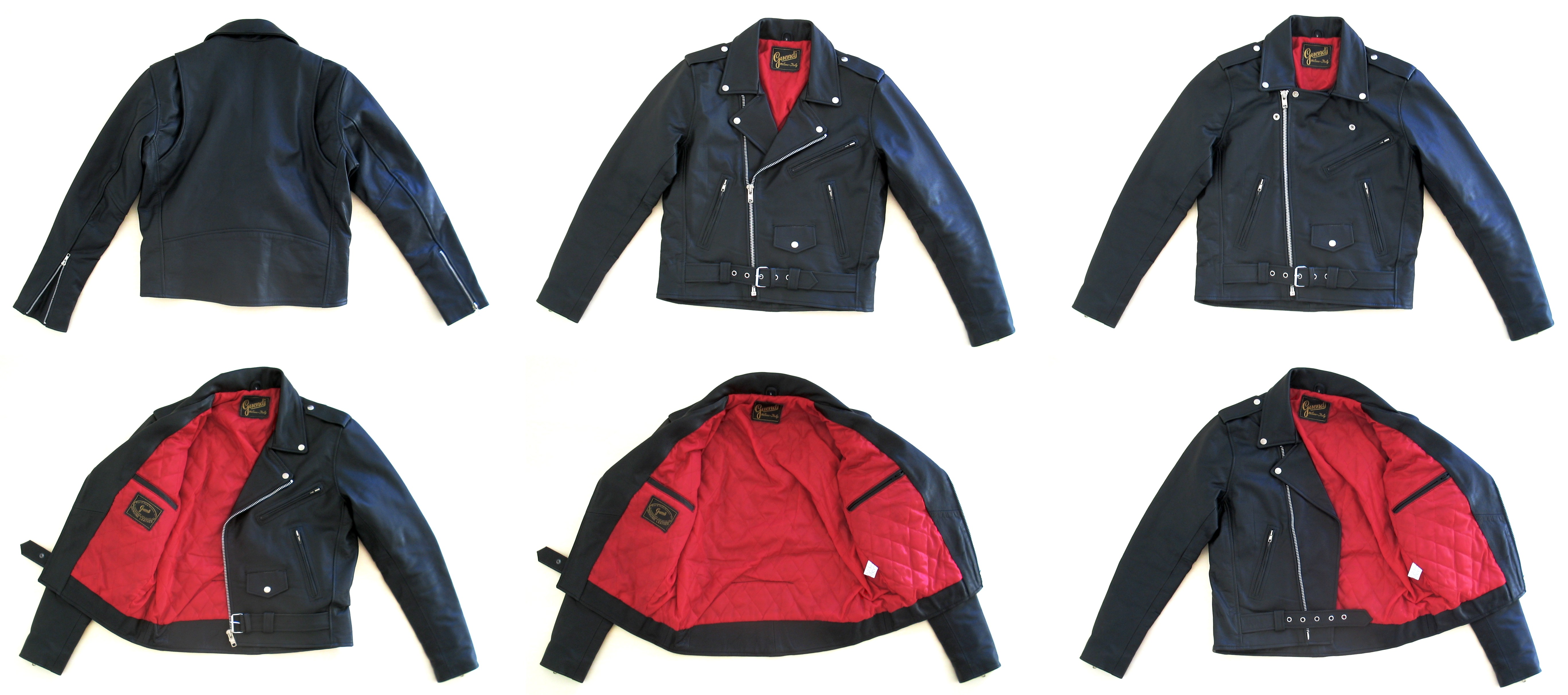
Different parts of a leather jacket

Antelope, buckskin, goatskin, sheepskin, horsehide and cowhide are the hides most commonly used to make leather jackets. As soon as the skin is removed from the animal at the meat processing plant, it is refrigerated, salted, or packed in barrels of brine. It is then sent to the tannery, where the skins undergo a series of processes designed to preserve and soften the hides. Sewing materials such as thread, lining, seam tape, buttons, snaps and zippers are generally bought from outside vendors and stored in the garment factory.

Most modern leather jackets are produced in Pakistan, India, Canada, Mexico and the United States, using hides left over from the meat industry. Fabrics simulating leather such as polyurethane or PVC are used as alternatives to authentic animal hide leather depending on the needs of the wearer such as those pursuing vegan lifestyles or for economic reasons as synthetic fibers tend to be less costly than authentic leather.

== Safety gear ==
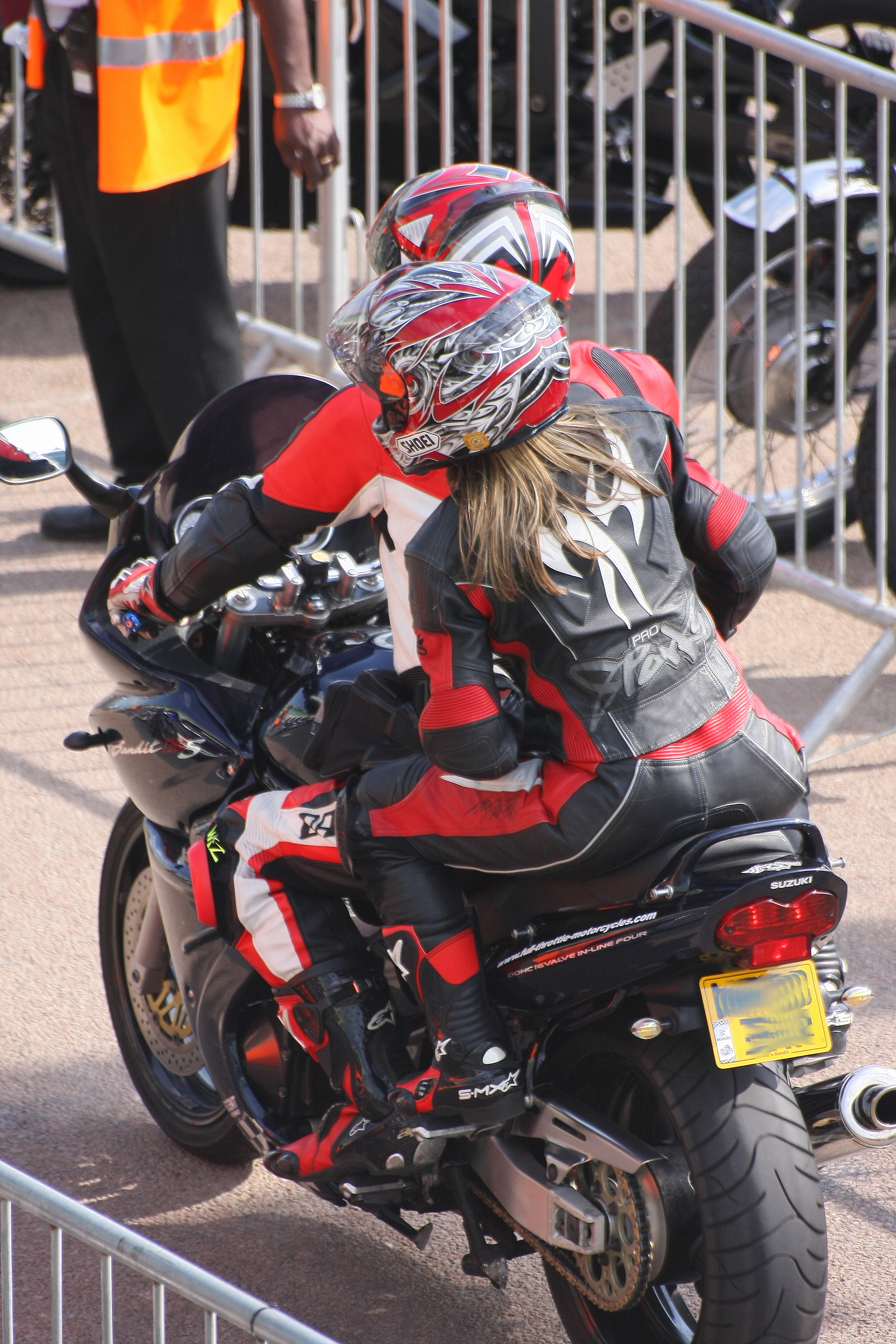
Motorcycle pillion passenger wearing a two-piece leather suit styled with a short jacket

There is a substantial difference between leather jackets made for fashion purposes, and those worn for protection, such as motorcycle personal protective equipment. Leather jackets designed for protective use are safety equipment and are heavier, thicker, and sometimes even equipped with armor, thus they are a practical item of clothing regardless of the symbolism invested in them by popular culture. A leather jacket primarily designed for fashion purposes would not be much protection in a motorcycle accident because of the jacket's flimsy construction. Motorcycle jackets often have more substantial zips, weatherproof pockets and closures, higher collars, and are styled to be longer at the back than the front to protect the kidneys of the riders from the cold while the rider is bent forward over the motorcycle.

== In popular culture ==
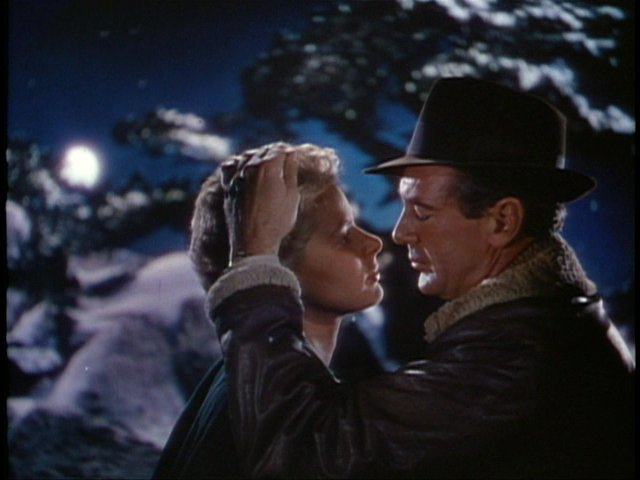
American actor Gary Cooper wore a leather jacket in his role as an International Brigades guerrilla fighter in the Spanish Civil War in For Whom the Bell Tolls

In media, a leather jacket is often used to shape a character, providing a cultural shorthand that signifies 'cool'.

- Early examples in film include a brown leather jacket with shearling collar worn by worn by actor Gary Cooper in For Whom the Bell Tolls (1943) and another worn by actor Jimmy Stewart in Night Passage (1957). Stewart had commanded a U.S. bomber squadron during World War II, and his actual leather jacket is displayed at the National Museum of the United States Air Force.
- 1960s British television series The Avengers featured actress Honor Blackman as Cathy Gale in both leather jackets and full leather outfits, which were selected for their durability while filming fight scenes. This was likely the first time that such garments had been shown on a woman on television.
- In the 1978 musical movie Grease, actress Olivia Newton-John as Sandy puts on a black leather jacket to symbolize her embrace of rebelliousness and greaser culture. This jacket was sold at auction in 2019, returned to the actress, and sold at auction again in 2024 to benefit cancer research.
- The iconic leather jacket worn by Harrison Ford as Indiana Jones beginning in 1981 was central to the filmmakers' concept for the character. The first hero jacket was produced through Berman & Nathans and combined a body shape inspired by the jacket worn by James Dean in Rebel Without a Cause (1955) with pockets modeled on those of the A-2 bomber jacket.
- Bates Leathers jackets are worn by the T-800 character in the Terminator films. From the first appearance of Arnold Schwarzenegger as the titular Terminator, these films evolved the symbolism of the leather biker jacket from youthful social rebellion toward mature defiance of convention.
- Leather flight jackets with fleece collars are worn by numerous characters in the film Top Gun (1986), including protagonist Maverick, played by actor Tom Cruise. The popularity of this jacket style in Top Gun has been credited as a factor in the United States Air Force reissue of leather A-2 jackets in 1987.
- Beginning with The Matrix (1999), the Matrix film series features multiple leather and leather-look trench coats and dusters. Although only actor Laurence Fishburne as Morpheus was initially shown in a leather jacket, with co-leads Keanu Reeves as Neo in matte woven fabrics and Carrie-Anne Moss as Trinity in reflective fabrics like PVC, the long coats shown in the first film contributed to the rising popularity of leather or pleather trench coats in the early to mid-2000s and sustained interest from streetwear to high fashion through the 2020s.
- During the Super Bowl 50 halftime show in 2016, singer Beyoncé featured background dancers wearing black leather jackets and berets as a visual homage to the Black Panther Party, in addition to references to the 1968 Olympics Black Power salute, the Black Lives Matter movement, and Malcolm X. This performance was subject to controversy from right-wing politicians and activists.
- Jensen Huang's black leather jacket was described as "a key part of [his] look."
