= G-1 military flight jacket =

US WWII-era Navy flight jacket

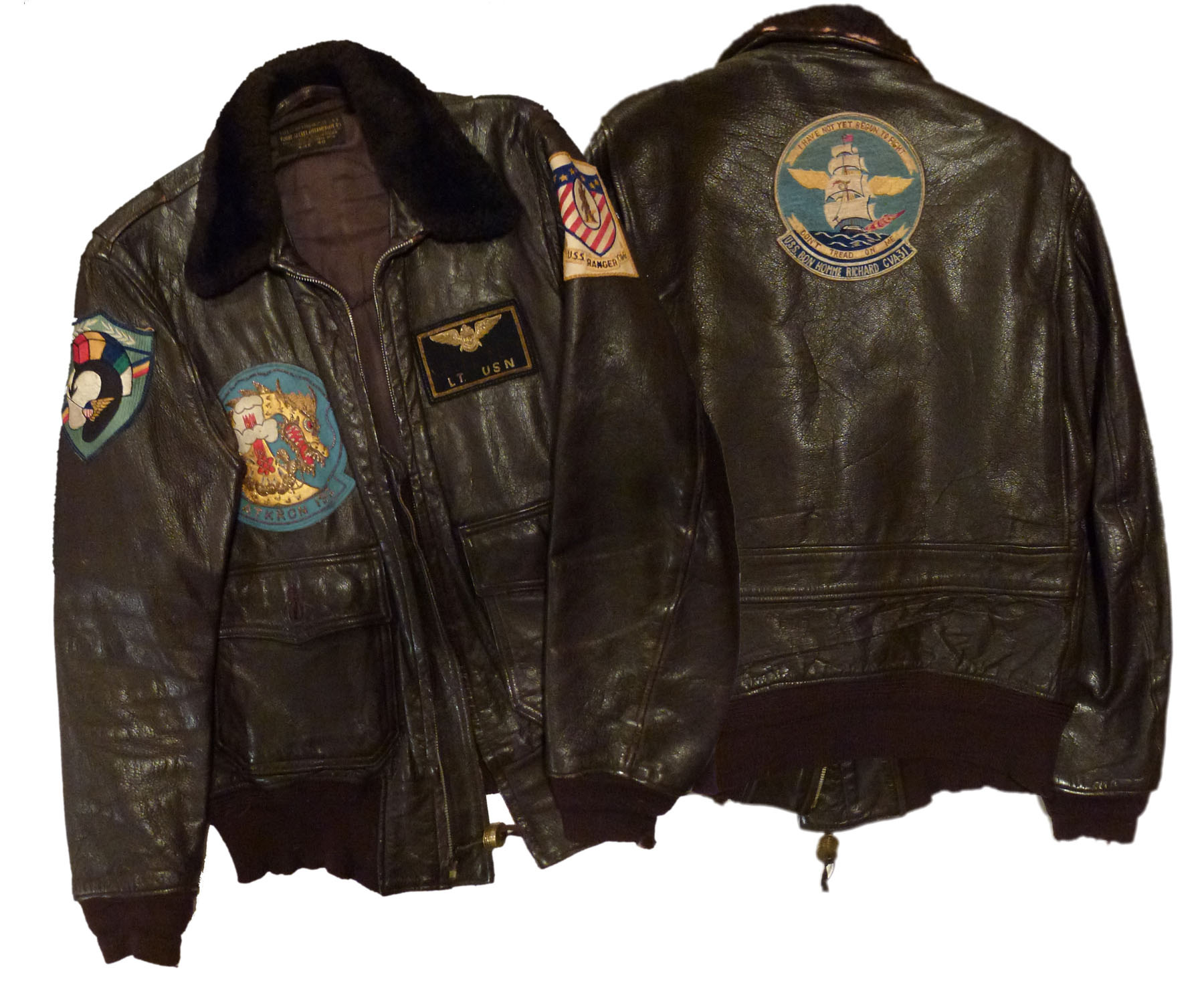
Navy G-1 flight jacket

The "G-1 Flight Jacket" is the commonly accepted name for the fur-lined-collar flight jacket used by Naval Aviators in the United States Navy, Marine Corps, and Coast Guard. It began with a completely new jacket specification on 28-Mar-1940, the M-422, and has been issued to this day; now in the current MIL-DTL-7823F iteration.

== Usage ==
The G-1 remains used by officer and enlisted aviation personnel on flying status in the U.S. Navy, U.S. Marine Corps and U.S. Coast Guard (i.e., Naval Aviator, Naval Flight Officer, Naval Flight Surgeon, Naval Aircrewman, etc.) and was featured as the leather flight jacket worn by Tom Cruise in the film Top Gun.

== History ==
The history of the "G-1" can be split into four parts, based upon the specification family: (1) M-422 / M-422a, (2) AN-J-3 / AN-J-3a, (3) 55-J-14, and (4) 7823.

The M-422 was constructed of chocolate brown chrome tanned goatskin, a fairly uniform color that has continued throughout all iterations, unlike the Air Force A-2 jacket in seal brown leather that was interpreted from being a light russet to dark brown color. The M-422 used a mouton collar, bi-swing back, rayon lining and silk thread throughout. Linen thread was used on the buttons beginning with the M-422a on 1-Oct-1940. The use of a different, stronger, "button thread" began with the M-422a and continues today. On 7 Dec 1940 a M-422a specification amendment to lengthen the sleeves was released and all M-422a contracts were based upon this amended specification version.

The joint Army/Navy AN-J-3 specification, using illustrative drawing AN6552, was a brief line-item update to the USN M-422a specification on 15-Apr-1943 and on the jacket only the label was changed. The AN-J-3 was quickly replaced by the jointly created AN-J-3a on 6-Oct-1943 (either the Spec or Drawing number can be on the label). In 1943 there was a severe leather shortage and the USN ordered no M-422a, AN-J-3 or AN-J-3a jackets during this timeframe. The US Navy considered the M-422a and AN-J-3a to be equivalent and both are listed by the same stock number in the Dec 1943 Aviation Supply Office catalog. The first jacket called a "G-1", internally, was the AN-J-3a as described in an Oct 1943 U.S. Aeronautical Board document.

The 55-J-14 specification saw the Navy move away from the joint Army-Navy AN-J-3a, but the Navy never made a 55-J-14 jacket based upon the original 31-Oct-1947 specification. 55-J-14 was amended 10-May-1949 and jackets were built to that specification. Interestingly, the last AN-J-3a contract, N383s-1035, was made in early 1949 though the reasons are unknown. The 55-J-14 was the first jacket to have "G-1 Flight Jacket" on the label.

The MIL-J-7823 specification began on 21-Nov-1951, with numerous iterations to follow. The nylon lining has been used throughout, with the permitted use of synthetic mouton (MIL-M-6590) beginning with MIL-J-7823D and cowhide (KK-L-162) added beginning with MIL-J-7823E Amendment #3. Unlike the original contracts that provided guidelines for construction, when clear manufacturer-to-manufacturer differences were seen, the current specifications go into great detail to ensure consistency across all manufacturers.

After the Second World War, it became common for G-1 jackets to be adorned with patches earned during a pilot's career. Patches include types of aircraft flown, milestones in carrier landings or total flying hours, and deployments or cruises carried out on certain ships.

For a very brief period from 1979 until early 1981, issuance of the G-1 to new USN, USMC, and USCG flight crew personnel (i.e., officer flight students and newly designated enlisted Naval Aircrewman) was discontinued as a budgetary economy action, with those personnel being issued summer weight green Nomex flight jackets identical to those issued to their U.S. Air Force counterparts. Replacement of worn-out G-1 jackets for extant Naval Aviation personnel was also discontinued during this period. This action was reversed by Secretary of the Navy action in early 1981, and those USN, USMC, and USCG flight-crew personnel who had not received G-1 jackets were issued one retroactively.

Modifications to USN, USMC, and USCG uniform regulations in the 1990s reduced the type and number of permissible insignia on the G-1, but concurrently permitted wear of the G-1 jacket off base with service uniforms.

== Commercial exploitation ==
Commercial versions of the jacket have been available on the consumer market. Official military suppliers which also sold similar spec jackets to the public include Cockpit USA, Cooper Sportswear, Orchard M/C, Brill Bros., Schott, and Excelled. After the success of the 1986 film Top Gun, shopping-mall leather stores carried a variety of G-1 variants. These are new production and come in goatskin and cowhide varieties stamped USN, USCG, or USMC. Jackets are offered by many companies for the civilian market, including US Authentic Mfg. Co., Lost Worlds, Gibson and Barnes, Eastman, US Wings and Bill Kelso Mfg.

== Manufacturers ==
The Jacket Specification [Implementation Date] are listed below in chronological order, then with known manufacturing companies followed by the contract number. Note for the M-422a contracts that The Bureau of Supplies & Accounts changed their identifying prefix in March 1942 from NOs to NXs, though when that change filtered down to the all the labels is unclear, making some contracts appear as either NOs-# or NXs-# on the label for the same contract. This occurred again when the prefix went from NXs-# to NXsa-# in Jan 1943.

M-422 [28-Mar-1940]

- Willis & Geiger Inc. N156s 16957
- Willis & Geiger Inc. NOs 74892
- Switlik Parachute and Equipment Co. NOs 76640

M-422a [1-Oct-1940]

- Monarch Mfg. Company NOs 79633 (label says M-422)
- Gordon & Ferguson, Inc. NOs 83538
- Willis & Geiger Inc. NOs 85956
- Monarch Mfg. Co. NOs 85958
- Gordon & Ferguson, Inc. NOs 88860
- Willis & Geiger Inc. NOs 290A & NXs 290
- Gordon & Ferguson, Inc. NOs 416-A & NXs 416
- Fried, Ostermann Co. NOs 1405-A
- Fried, Ostermann Co. NOs 1406-A & NXs 1406 EXT. A
- Edmund T. Church Co., Inc. NXs 5133
- H.& L. Block NXs 5134 & NXsa 5134

AN-J-3 [15-Apr-1943]

- Per US Government documents the AN-J-3 was never procured by the US Navy or US Army Air Force (a severe leather shortage occurred when the AN-J-3 would have been available for purchase)

AN-J-3A [5-Oct-1943]

- H.& L. Block N288s-20559
- Monarch Mfg. Co. N288s-20570
- Arnoff Mfg. Company N288xsa 24248
- Bogen & Tenebaum N288s-24331
- American Sportswear Co. N288s-24332
- Gordon & Ferguson, Inc. N288s-24333
- Burjac Sportswear Inc. N288s-24369
- American Sportswear Co. N288s-28627
- Willis & Geiger Inc. N288s28628
- Monarch Mfg. Co. N288xsa-28665
- Gordon & Ferguson, Inc. N288s - 32277
- Bogen & Tenebaum N288s32281
- Willis & Geiger Inc. N288s32357
- Monarch Mfg. Co. N288s-32358
- Willis & Geiger Inc. N288s-35805
- L.W. Foster Sportswear Co., Inc. N383s1035

55-J-14 [10-May-1949]

- Burjac Sportswear Inc. N383s-5299
- L.W. Foster Sportswear Co., Inc. N383S-10427
- L.W. Foster Sportswear Co., Inc. N383s-13120
- L.W. Foster Sportswear Co., Inc. N383s-20445
- Aviators Clothing Co., Inc. N383s-22111
- B.-G. Inc. N383s-25923
- L.W. Foster Sportswear Co., Inc. N383S-29897
- Star Sportswear Mfg. Co. N383Ss-39943
- Star Sportswear Mfg. Co. N383s-51863
- A. Pritzker & Sons, Inc. N383s-69537

MIL-J-7823 [21-Nov-1951]

- L.W. Foster Sportswear Co., Inc. N383s-74471
- Monarch Mfg. Co. N383s-80667
- Werber Sportswear Inc. N383S-88886
- A. Pritzker & Sons, Inc. N383S-319A
- J.A. Dubow Sporting Goods Corp. N383S-4765A
- J.A. Dubow Sporting Goods Corp. N383S-4833A
- Cagleco Sportswear N383s-9211A
- Cagleco Sportswear N383s-14722A
- L.W. Foster Sportswear Co., Inc. N383-22356A
- Cagleco Sportswear N383-28657A
- Cagleco Sportswear N383-39321A
- Cagleco Sportswear N383 48082A
- Cagleco Sportswear QM(CTM)-144-O.I.-2515-E-57
- L.W. Foster Sportswear Co., Inc. DA-36-243-QM(CTM)2132
- Ralph Edwards Sportswear QM(CTM)-2313
- L.W. Foster Sportswear Co., Inc. DA-36-243-QM(CTM)2314

MIL-J-7823A [28-Nov-1958]

- California Sportswear Co. (label says MIL-J-7823) QM(CTM)4771-E-60
- Breier of Amsterdam, Inc. (label says MIL-J-7823) QM(CTM)6837-C-60
- Ralph Edwards Sportswear, Inc. (label says MIL-J-7823A) QM(CTM)8833C-61
- Irvin B. Foster & Sons Sportswear Co., Inc. (label says MIL-J-7823A) DA36-243-QM(CTM)8834-C-61

MIL-J-7823B [7-Oct-1960]

- Ralph Edwards Sportswear, Inc. QM(CTM) 10276-C-61
- Ralph Edwards Sportswear, Inc. QM(CTM) 11214-C-62
- Irvin B. Foster & Sons Sportswear Co., Inc. DSA-1-435-C-62
- Ralph Edwards Sportswear, Inc. DSA-1-1040-63-C
- Ralph Edwards Sportswear, Inc. DSA-1-2071-63-C

MIL-J-7823C [3-Sept-1963]

- Star Sportswear Mfg. Co. DSA-1-3271-64-C
- Ralph Edwards Sportswear, Inc. DSA-1-4342-64-C
- Irvin B. Foster & Sons Sportswear Co., Inc. DSA-1-8825
- Irvin B. Foster & Sons Sportswear Co., Inc. DSA-1-8826
- Ralph Edwards Sportswear, Inc. DSA-1-9366
- Irvin B. Foster & Sons Sportswear Co., Inc. DSA-100-308
- Irvin B. Foster & Sons Sportswear Co., Inc. DSA 100-598
- Star Sportswear Mfg. Co. DSA 100-599

MIL-J-7823D [19-Apr-1966]

- Star Sportswear Mfg. Co. DSA 100-67-C-1095
- Gregory Sportswear, Inc. DSA 100-67-C-3928
- The Martin Lane Co., Inc. DSA 100-68-C-0099
- Star Sportswear Mfg. Co. DSA 100-68-C-0759
- Brill Bros., Inc. DSA 100-68-C-1805
- Star Sportswear Mfg. Co. DSA 100-69-C-1095
- The Martin Lane Co., Inc. DSA 100-69-C-1545
- Star Sportswear Mfg. Co. DSA 100-70-C-0475
- Star Sportswear Mfg. Co. DSA 100-70-C-0483
- Brill Bros., Inc. DSA 100-70-C-0484
- Brill Bros., Inc. DSA 100-71-C-0141
- Star Sportswear Mfg. Co. DSA 100-71-C-0535

MIL-J-7823E [15-Jan-1971]

- Brill Bros., Inc. DSA 100-71-C-1343
- Star Sportswear Mfg. Co. DSA 100-72-C-0060
- Brill Bros., Inc. DSA 100-72-C-1138
- Star Sportswear Mfg. Co. DSA 100-73-C-0034
- Brill Bros., Inc. DSA 100-73-C-0035
- Imperial Fashions, Inc. DSA 100-74-0162
- Star Sportswear Mfg. Co. DSA 100-75-C-0331
- Brill Bros., Inc. DSA 100-75-C-0332
- Imperial Leather & Sportswear Inc. DSA 100-76-C-1788
- Imperial Leather & Sportswear Inc. DSA 100-76-C-0375
- Ralph Edwards Sportswear, Inc. DSA 100-77-C-1518
- Brill Bros., Inc. DLA 100-82-C-0564
- Ralph Edwards Sportswear DLA 100-84-C-0771
- Brill Bros., Inc. DLA 100-86-C-0451
- Orchard M/C Dist., Inc. DLA 100-86-C-0481
- Brill Bros., Inc. DLA 100-87-C-0739
- Cooper Sportswear Mfg. Co., Inc. DLA 100-89-C-0480
- Cooper Sportswear Mfg. Co., Inc. DLA 100-91-C-0323
- Cooper Sportswear Mfg. Co., Inc. DLA 100-92-C-0454
- Cooper Sportswear Mfg. Co., Inc. SPO-100-95-M-SH82
- Cooper Sportswear Mfg. Co., Inc. SPO-100-96-C-4015
- Schott Bros., Inc. SPO-100-98-C-5015
- Excelled Sheepskin Leather Coat Co. SPO-100-99-D-5076-0001
- Pharr Brand Name Apparel SPO-100-04-D-4247-0001
- Excelled Sheepskin Leather Coat Co. SPO-100-04-4119

MIL-DTL-7823F [9-Jun-2020]

== See also ==
- Flight jacket
- A-2 jacket
- MA-1 bomber jacket
- MA-2 bomber jacket
