= MA2 =

MA-2 may refer to:

- MA-2 bomber jacket, a nylon flight jacket
- Massachusetts Route 2
  - Massachusetts Route 2A
- The abbreviation for Massachusetts's 2nd congressional district
- Mercury-Atlas 2, a test flight of Project Mercury
