= Flight jacket =

Casual jacket originally worn by aviators

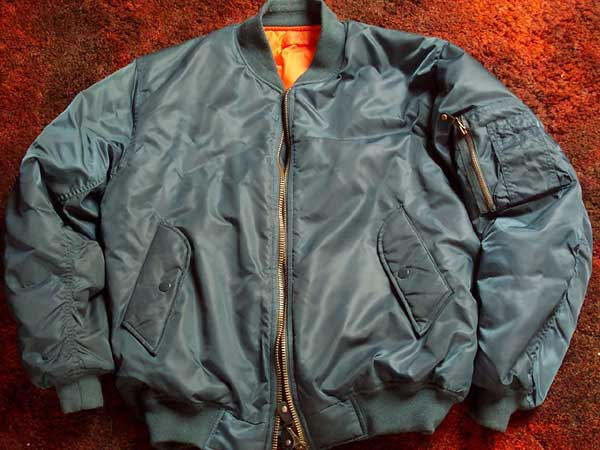
A modern nylon MA-1 bomber jacket

A flight jacket is a casual jacket that was originally created for pilots and eventually became part of popular culture and apparel. It has evolved into various styles and silhouettes, including the letterman jacket and the fashionable bomber jacket that is known today.

== Flight jacket ==
=== Early history ===
==== World War I ====
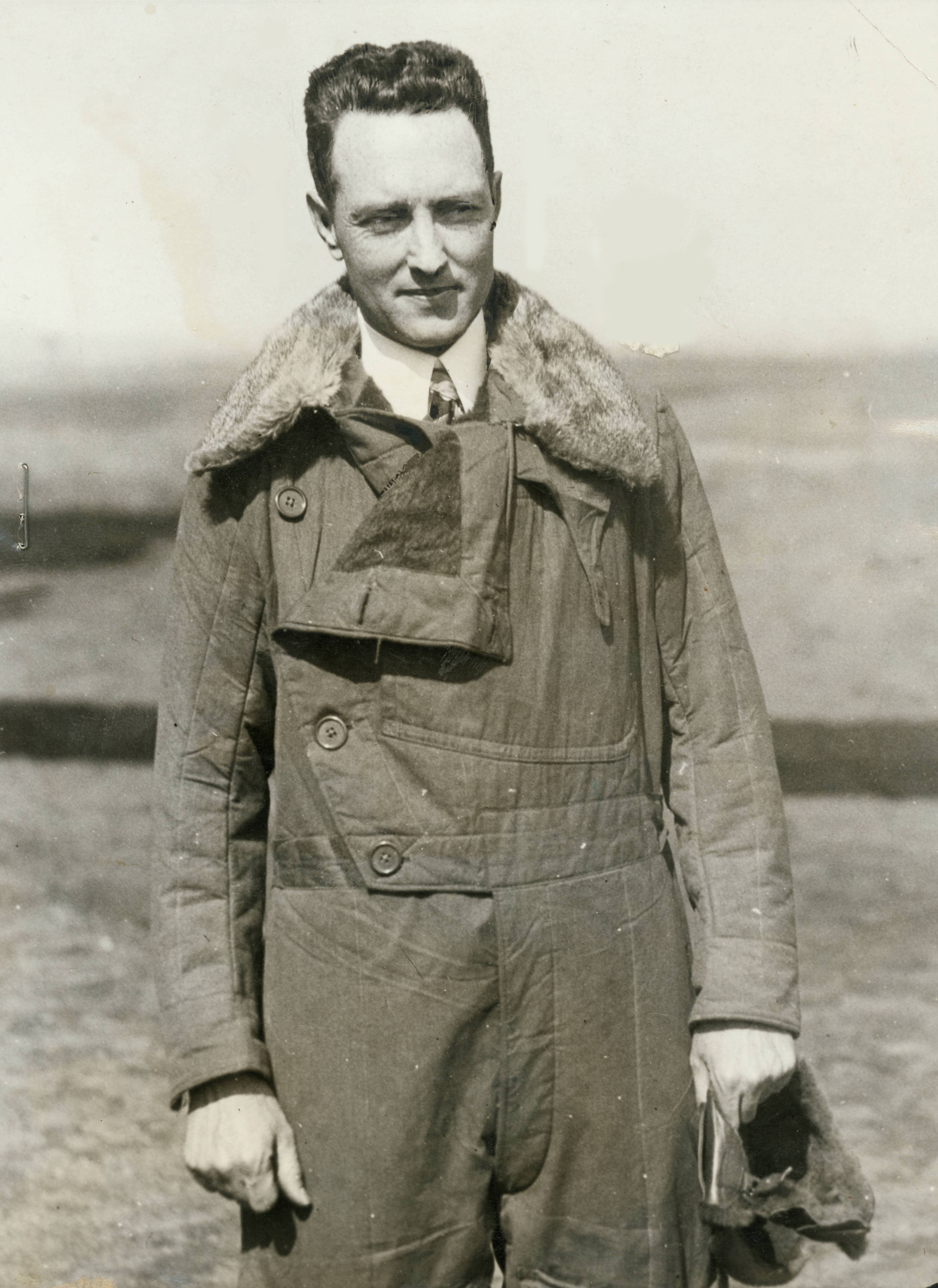
Richard Byrd in flight jacket, 1920s

In World War I, most airplanes did not have an enclosed cockpit, so pilots had to wear something that would keep them sufficiently warm. The U.S. Army officially established the Aviation Clothing Board in September 1917 and began distributing heavy-duty leather flight jackets; with high wraparound collars, zipper closures with wind flaps, snug cuffs and waists, and some fringed and lined with fur.

==== World War II ====
Leslie Irvin first designed and manufactured the classic sheepskin flying jacket. In 1926 he set up a manufacturing company in the United Kingdom, and became the main supplier of flying jackets to the Royal Air Force during most of World War II. However, due to the high demand in the early years of the war, the Irvin company employed subcontractors, leading to slight variations in design and color seen in early production Irvin flying jackets.

As aerospace technology improved, the altitudes at which aircraft operated increased. Some heavy bombing raids in Europe during World War II took place from altitudes of at least 25,000 ft (7,600 m), where ambient temperatures could reach as cold as −50 °C (−58 °F). The cabins of these aircraft were uninsulated, so a warm, thick flight jacket was an essential piece of equipment for every member of the crew.

=== Flight jackets in the United States ===
The two most historical American flight jackets are the A-2 jacket of the Air Force and the G-1 of the Naval Aviators. The A-2, first made in 1931, remains the most recognizable and sought-after American flight jacket. The G-1, descended from the M-422, was designed by the U.S. Navy to parallel the Air Corps’ A-2. Their popularity evolved into symbols of honor, adventure, and style. Hollywood films like Top Gun boosted sales of the G-1 tremendously, making bomber jackets collector and fashion items.

In addition to the A-2 and G-1 jackets, shearling jackets, originally lined with fur, are recognized for being the warmest flight jackets. Even when the fur was replaced with wool, this coat was warm enough to keep Lt. John A. Macready warm when he set a world record in April 1921, reaching an altitude of 40,000 feet in his open-cockpit airplane. Styles range from the US Air Force B-3 "bomber jacket", to the US Navy M-445. Also popular in the military were, and still are, synthetic jackets. Styles range from the cotton twill B-series to the standardized jacket of the U.S. Navy, the CWU-series. Both synthetic and shearling jackets are worn and collected by army buffs today, but neither has the historical status of the A-2 jacket or the G-1.

Today, flight jackets are usually associated with the MA-1, a now-obsolete U.S. military jacket, which is mostly found in sage green. It is made with flight silk nylon and usually has a blaze orange lining, with the specification tag in the pocket, though earlier models had a sage-green lining and the specification tag on the neck area. It features two slanted flap pockets on the front, two inner pockets, and a zipped pocket with pen holders on the left sleeve. The lighter-weight version of the MA-1, known as the L-2B flight jacket, replaced both the original L-2 and L-2A jackets. Unlike the MA-1, all three have snap-down epaulets and no inside pockets. The military flight jackets currently used today are the CWU-45P (for colder weather) and the CWU-36P (for warmer weather); both are made from Nomex.

=== Civilian uses ===
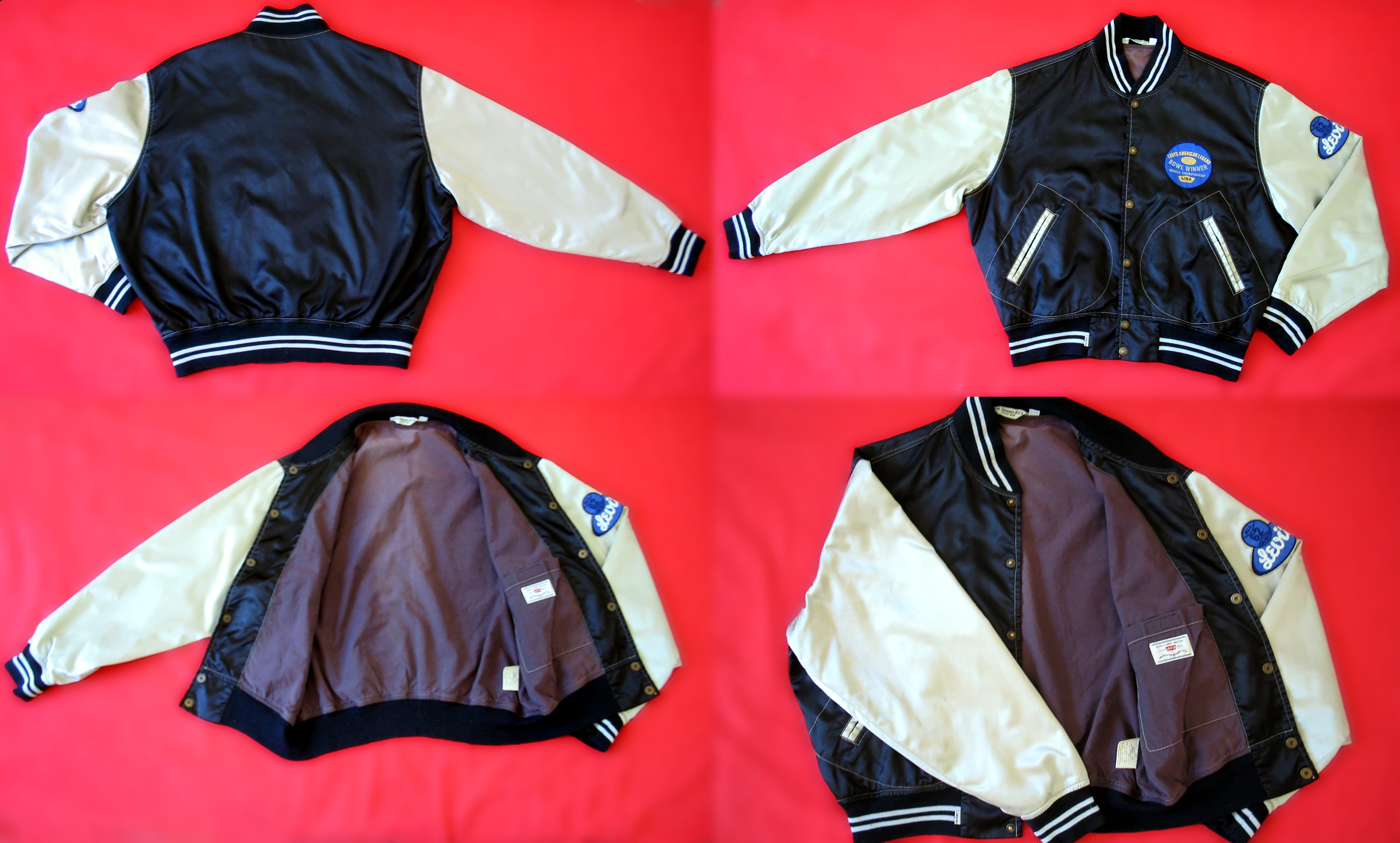
Baseball bomber jacket 1980s-style summer

In the 1970s and 1990s, flight jackets became popular with scooterboys and skinheads. In the 1980s, a baseball style bomber jacket became popular. In 1993, uniform flight jackets were given out by Bill Clinton at the APEC meeting held in Seattle, Washington. In the early 2000s, the bomber jacket was popular casual wear in hip-hop fashion. The jacket has also caught on with several police departments across the United States for its sturdy design and heavy insulation. The flight jacket has had a resurgence in popularity during the 2010s in street fashion, and is a notable staple of celebrities such as Kanye West.

=== Examples ===
- A-2 jacket
- B-3 jacket
- B-6 jacket
- B-16 WASP Women Airforce Service Pilots
- G-1 military flight jacket
- MA-1 bomber jacket

== Letterman jacket ==
=== Background and history ===
The varsity letters were first customized by Harvard University in 1865 and originally designed to reward baseball players on their teams as a token for exceptional performance. The term "letterman" comes from the letter, which is the initial or signature icon, that is placed on the front or back of these sweaters and jackets. These "letterman" (also known as "varsity") sweaters or jackets were worn to represent the social identities of athletes and reflect a strong sense of team spirit, pride of belonging to a particular school, and values of collectivism. The letters on the jackets represented the school and were therefore placed with the intention of acknowledging scholastic achievement of the wearer.

As the trend of letterman jackets spread among colleges and teenagers after WWII, the concept was expanded to award the performance of students in aspects other than sports. With the increasing number of university students due to the popularization of high school education in the US, these jackets are no longer specialized for athletic players but represent a student's identity through their school/college's initials. Similar to the flight jacket, letterman jackets have a loose-fitted silhouette that is genderless in style, although they may include a banded collar for men or a top-buttoned hood that unbuttons into an expanded collar for women.

=== Materials and techniques ===
The body of the jacket is usually made of boiled wool which provides warmth and the sleeves are generally made of leather with banded wrists and waistbands. The letter of the belonging school is mostly constructed in chenille and felt materials and made in the school's signature color. The "moss stitch" creates the chenille look of the letter with a chain stitch to provide an outline to the letter. Nowadays, Bomber Jackets are made from a variety of materials. These include leather, wool, silk, satin and suede.

=== Colors ===
Since the letterman jackets represent the student's identity according to which school they come from, they are usually designed according to the school's signature color. Mostly, the school's primary signature color is applied on the body of the jacket while the sleeves are the school's secondary signature color. For example, the Harvard letterman jackets are usually crimson, blue or green on the body color and white or gold on the sleeves.

=== Influences ===
Besides serving as an identity of university/college students, the letterman jacket was modified and became a popular casual wear in the hip-hop fashion segment during the early 2000s and started to evolve into the bomber jacket. Led by Kanye West, bomber jackets became an iconic hip-hop fashion item instead of being associated with the military or colleges. Teenagers often enjoy customizing their own bomber jackets with their favorite colors and own initials to represent themselves. With the global trend of hip hop in recent years, bomber jackets have become an essential fashion item that includes varied design elements.

== Bomber jacket ==
=== Background and history ===
The bomber jacket originates from military clothing which trickled down into subcultures such as punk. In 2001 the bomber jacket found its way into high fashion with Raf Simon's "Riot, Riot, Riot" MA-1 jacket. The jacket also featured prominently in Prada's men's fall 2023 collection. The military bomber jacket was made to be versatile for functionality as it was a lightweight jacket that kept aircrews warm. The B-15 jacket consisted of a fur collar made of cotton which was later changed to nylon after 1945 since it was considered more suitable because it is water resistant and kept perspiration out (Cruz, 2016). Bomber jackets appeared in Europe during the late 1950s. In 1963, the jackets were popularized by European Air Forces and eventually reached the commercial consumer.

Japan was also greatly influenced by the American fashion sense after the Second World War. Notably in 1951, Kensuke Ishizu established his brand VAN that gave Japanese youth culture stylish clothing not found locally such as oxford shirts and slim trousers. The bomber jacket remained popular during the later twentieth century as a part of the grunge subculture and streetwear, and maintains popularity today.

=== Silhouette ===
The silhouette of the bomber jacket has not altered much compared to the original, although it has an athletic and masculine silhouette with a fitted waist and more generous fit, like the bulky sleeves and extra pockets so as to be functional. The bomber jacket trend inspired a vast majority of fashion designers to reinterpret and revisit the silhouette of menswear today. For instance, the S/S 2000 collections from Raf Simons which changed the original design into a more symmetrical form, the elongated bombers from Rick Owens, floral printed versions from Balenciaga, Dries Van Noten and many more.

The bomber jacket is a neutral fashion item with no limitations when it comes to genders, ages or styles. Shapes of the bomber jackets are modified into dress-like jackets or even one-piece dresses.

=== Materials ===
Due to high altitudes and breakneck speeds in less advanced airplanes compared to the modern day, Royal Flying Corps in Belgium and France started to wear heavy leather flying jackets in the 1910s as leather was considered the heaviest and strongest material for jackets. Since then, original bomber jackets were made in heavy-duty leather in order to provide warmth for military pilots.

The A2, which was released by the US Army Air Corps, was made with high wraparound collars, cinched cuffs and waists, and zipper closures protected by wind flaps and fur linings and had a high durability. Since then, there have been various versions of the bomber jacket, from having fur collars, cotton outers, and leather straps to knit collars and orange lining in the bomber jacket to aid in visibility in case an incident were to occur.

Civilian bomber-style jackets were made from materials including leather, wool, silk, neoprene, satin, and gauze. Some decorative elements like ruffles, embroidered patchwork, lace-ups are also added to the bomber jackets, these jacket are available in a range of colors, fabrications, and styles.

=== Colors ===
Bomber jackets originally appeared in a midnight blue hue, which was later switched to a sage green after the Korean and Vietnamese wars since it was easier for soldiers to camouflage themselves amongst the forests or countryside during the 1960s. Bomber jackets became popular in the non-military audience in the late 1960s to 1980s, especially when the English punks and skinheads started taking over the trend and changed the color into burgundy in order to distinguish themselves and their bomber jackets from the original military flight jackets. Brown is also a classic colour for leather flight jackets.

Due to the popularity of the jacket, both high street and high end brands have designed the bomber jacket in a variety of hues. Other than the standard navy blue, army green and black, the bomber can be found in pastel tones such as baby pink, blue, mint, or even gold and silver. Many designers and fashion brands have taken inspiration from bomber jackets, featuring them in magazines and on the runway.

== See also ==
- G-1 military flight jacket
- Blouson
- Eisenhower jacket
- G-suit
- Leather jacket
- MA-1 bomber jacket
- MA-2 bomber jacket
- Sukajan
