= Letterman (sports) =

Classification of high school or college athlete in the United States

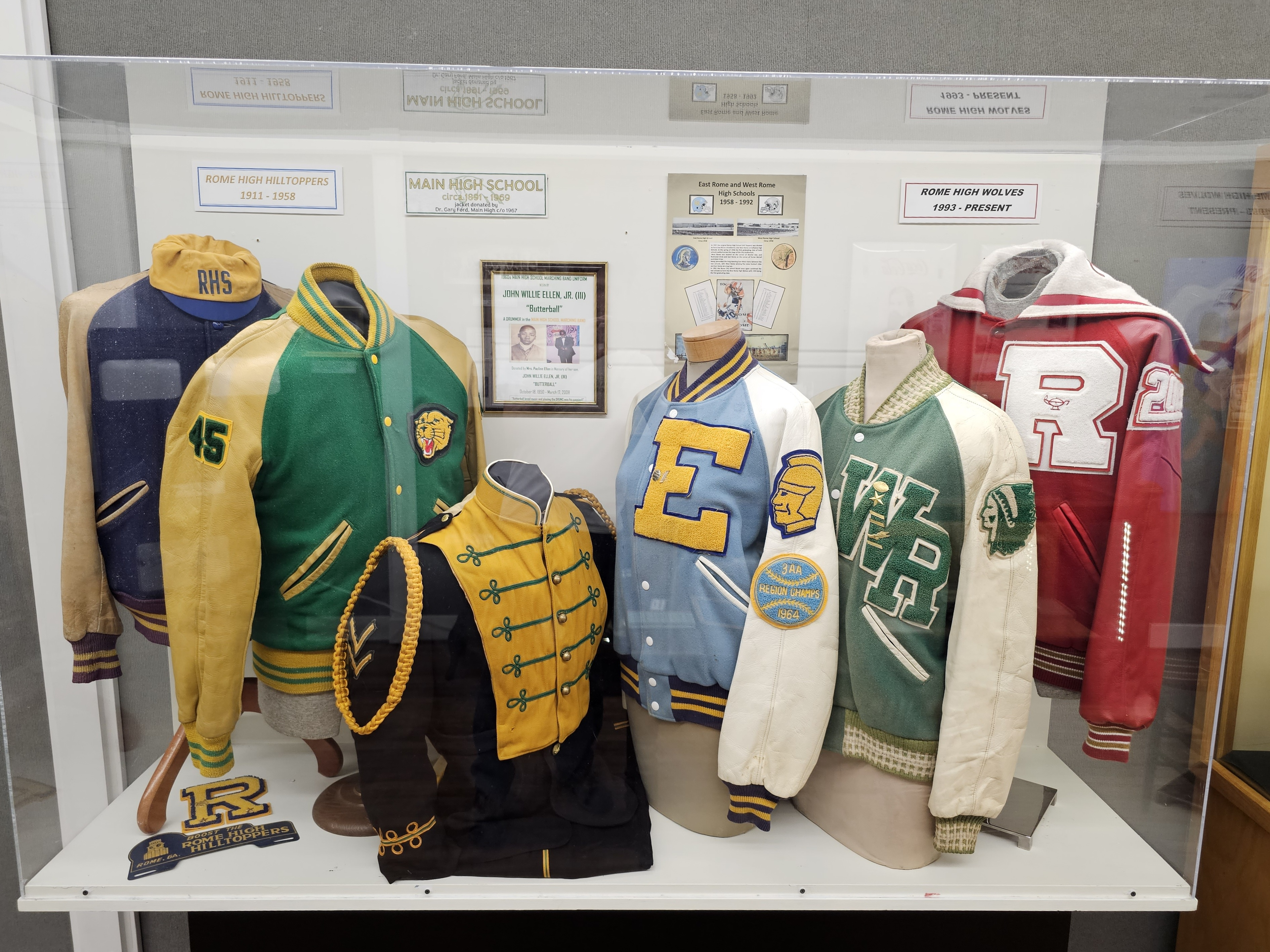
- Several letter jackets and a marching band uniform (third from left) from Rome High School and its predecessor institutions in Rome, Georgia
- Year: Late 19th century
- Type: Letter jacket / Varsity letter
- Material: Boiled wool, Leather, Chenille fabric

In sports or activities in the United States, a letterman is a high school or college student who has met a specified level of participation or performance on a varsity team.

== Overview ==
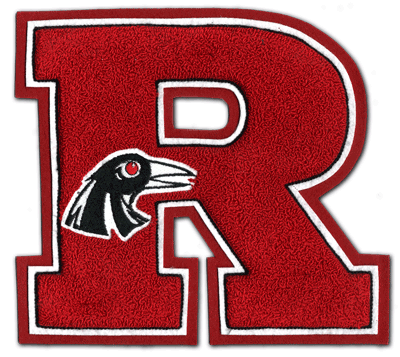
Traditional block letter with embroidered mascot

The term comes from the practice of awarding each such participant a cloth "letter", which is usually the school's initial or initials, for placement on a "letter sweater" or "letter jacket" intended for the display of such an award. In some instances, the sweater or jacket itself may also be awarded, especially for the initial award to a given individual. Today, in order to distinguish "lettermen" from other team participants, schools often establish a minimum level of participation in a team's events or a minimum level of performance in order for a letter to be awarded. A common threshold in American football and basketball is participation in a set level, often half, of all quarters in a season. In individual sports such as tennis and golf, the threshold for lettering is generally participation in one half or sometimes two-thirds of all matches contested. Frequently, other members of the team who fail to meet requirements for a letter are awarded a certificate of participation or other award considered to be of lesser value than a letter.

Some schools continue to base the awarding of letters according to performance, in team sports requiring a certain number of touchdowns, catches, scores, steals, baskets or tackles, according to position and sport. In individual sports letters are often determined according to qualification for state meets or tournaments. Other schools award letters on a more subjective basis, with the head coach, usually with the input of other coaches and sometimes student team leaders who have already lettered, awarding letters for substantial improvement as well as significant performance on or off the field. This places much more emphasis on character, commitment and teamwork as well as, and often in place of, simply playing enough or meeting some other time or performance requirement. Sometimes in high schools academic performance in classes can also be an element. This philosophy gives more focus to developing and rewarding a well-rounded and balanced player, where other methods focus strictly on athletic performance and on the field victories. This term is not gender-specific; a qualifying participant in women's basketball or other women's sports is properly referred to as a letterman, as would be a qualifying female participant on a co-educational sports team. An athlete who is awarded a letter (or letters in multiple sports) is said to have "lettered" when they receive their letter.

In recent years, some schools have expanded the concept of letterman beyond sports, providing letters for performance in performing arts, academics, or other school activities.

== Letter jacket ==
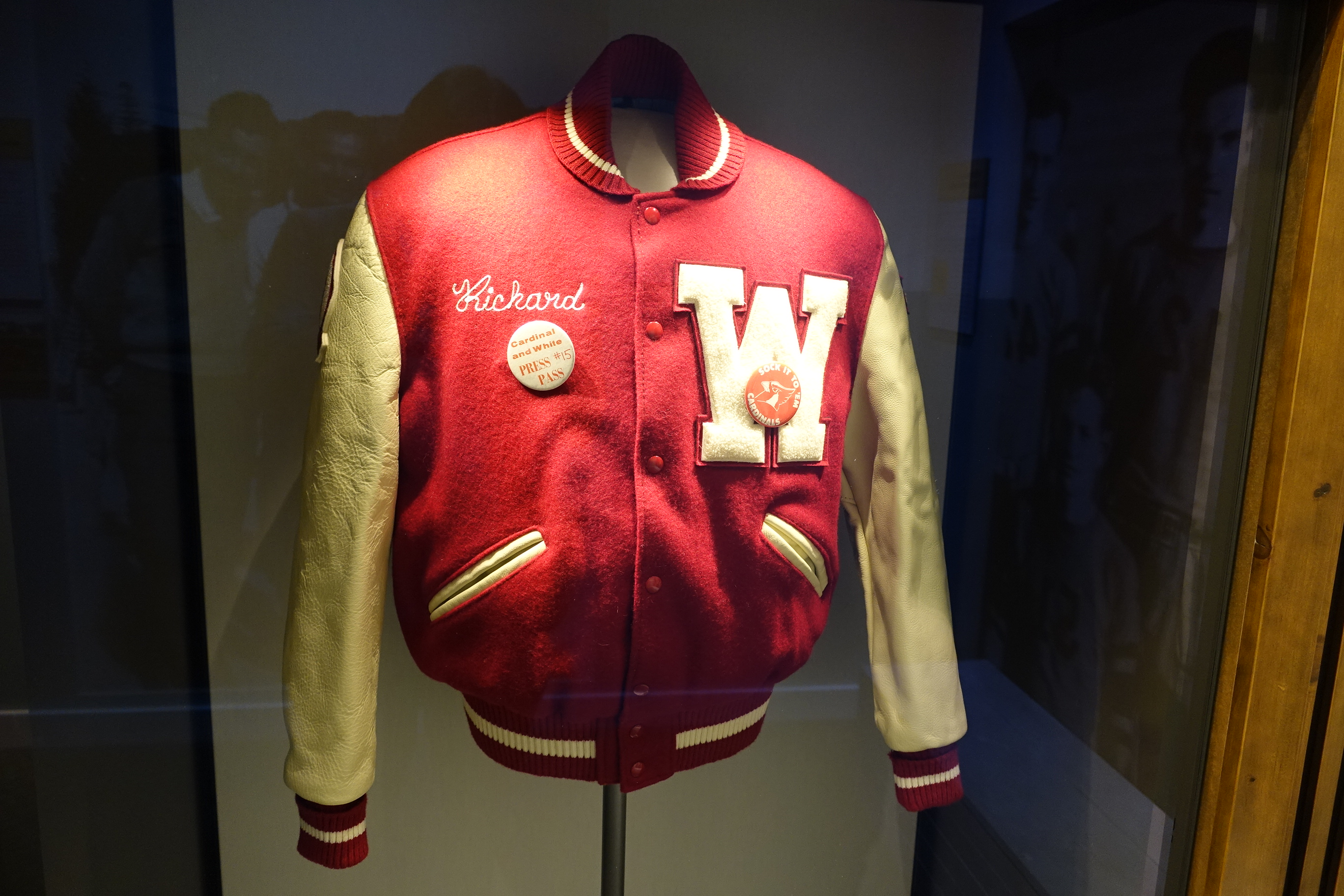
Richard Nixon letterman jacket from the Whittier High School, Back to the Beginning and Early Years part, Richard Nixon Presidential Library and Museum, Yorba Linda, CA.

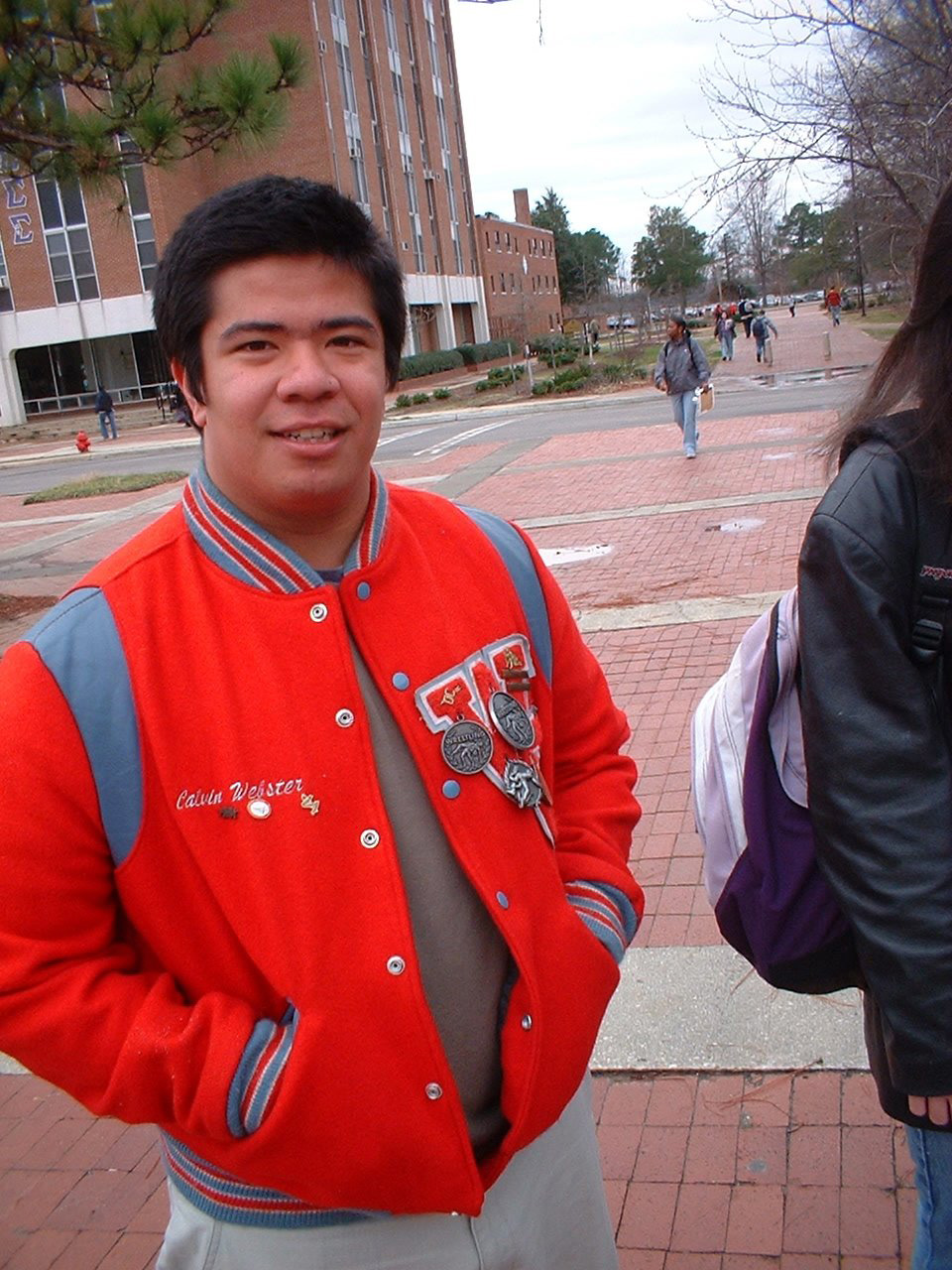
A student wearing a wool baseball jacket with embroidered letter "W" and award medals.

A letter jacket is a baseball-styled jacket traditionally worn by high school and college students in the United States to represent school and team pride as well as to display personal awards earned in athletics, academics or activities. Letter jackets are also known as "letterman jackets", "varsity jackets" and "baseball jackets" in reference to their American origins.

=== Appearance and style ===
The body (i.e., torso) is usually of boiled wool and the sleeves of leather with banded wrists, collar, and waistband. Letter jackets are usually produced in the school colors, with the body of the jacket in the school's primary color and sleeves in the secondary color, although sometimes, the colors of the jacket may be customized to a certain extent by the student. There could be cases where a student could change the color so much that it doesn't differentiate too much from school colors. They usually feature a banded collar for men or a top-buttoned hood (that unbuttons into an expanded collar) for women.

In rare cases, the student may choose to apply the letter and decorations to an "own garment" which does not typically require school approval. This may be for motorcycle commuters, lettermen with sensory sensitivity, those with existing Scouting or martial arts award jackets, or simply a stubborn adherance to a particular aesthetic and a garment the right color.

=== Decorations ===
The letter jacket derives its name from the varsity letter chenille patch on its left breast, which is almost always the first letter or initials of the high school or college the jacket came from. The letter itself can also be custom fitted to the particular sport or activity (e.g. cross country—a symbol or sign in the middle of the letter).

The name of the owner usually appears either in chenille (matching the letter) or embroidered on the jacket itself. The owner's graduation year typically appears in matching chenille. Placement of the name and year of graduation depends on school traditions. The year is most often sewn on the right sleeve or just above the right pocket. The school logo and symbols representing the student's activities may also be ironed onto the jacket. Lettermen who play on a championship team often receive a large patch commemorating their championship that is worn on the back of the jacket.

Lettermen who participate in a sport in which medals are awarded often sew the medals onto their jackets to display their accomplishments.

=== History ===
Varsity jackets trace their origins to letter sweaters, first introduced by the Harvard University baseball team in 1865. The letter was usually quite large and centered (if the sweater was a pullover); stripes on one sleeve designated the number of letters won, with a star indicating a team captain.

By the 1930s, the lettered apparel had developed its well-known look: wool jackets with differently colored leather sleeves, and chenille lettering.

Today, many letterman companies have added cellphone pockets to their jackets.

=== Traditions ===
Letter jackets are almost never purchased before a student has earned a letter. In schools where only varsity letters are awarded, this is usually the practice in a student's junior or senior year. Recently, many student-athletes have been awarded letters during their sophomore and sometimes freshman year, leading to the need for a jacket much sooner. Still, the actual jacket is not usually purchased until the sophomore year. In schools where junior varsity letters are awarded, the jacket may be purchased by junior varsity letter recipients, though the letter is placed just above the left pocket, leaving space for a future varsity letter.

Some schools may award letter jackets to letter winners at an award ceremony, but more often, the school only provides the letter. Some schools will have fundraising activities or other programs to provide jackets to students who cannot afford them.

While it is commonly done, removing one's letter from the letter jacket upon graduation is not firmly held as protocol. Many graduates keep the letter on the jacket after graduation as a symbol of accomplishment and school pride and commitment, especially with college lettermen.

== See also ==
- Sporting colours
  - Blue (university sport)
