= Blouson =

Jacket originally worn by militaries

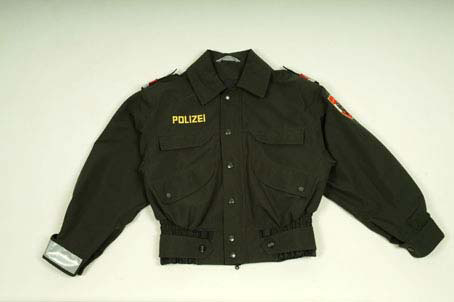
An Austrian Bundespolizei blouson.

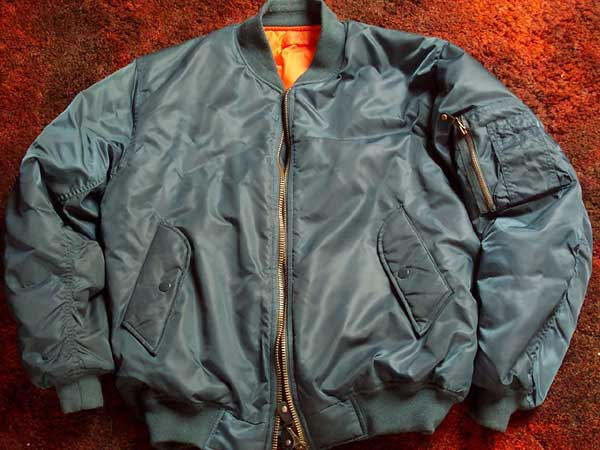
A modern nylon MA-1 flight jacket.

A blouson or blouse jacket is a jacket that is drawn tight at the waist, causing it to blouse out and hang over the waistband. Originating in military uniforms of the mid-20th century, versions continue to be used as part of military, paramilitary and law enforcement uniforms in many places. As a piece of civilian clothing, it is considered to be both sportswear and casual clothing.

== History ==
During World War II, British soldiers wore battledress uniforms that featured a jacket with an integrated belt to cinch the jacket tightly at the waist. These in turn inspired the creation of the United States Army's M-1944 field jacket, better known after its principal advocate as the Eisenhower jacket.

The MA-1 bomber jacket was originally designed for the US military during the 1950s. The MA-2 bomber jacket has now taken its place.

The Black jacket was popularized by Yves Saint Laurent and was donned by some music groups in the late 1950s and early 1960s. Modern flight jackets have been popular with skinheads and scooterboys from the 1980s onwards.

In 1993, a blouson was worn as the national costume of the United States for the APEC meeting held in Seattle, Washington. In the early 2000s, the jacket was popular casual wear in hip hop fashion.

== Raid jacket ==
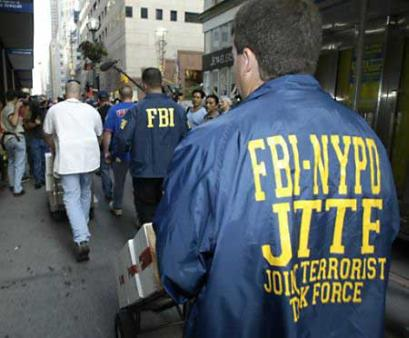
FBI-NYPD Joint Terrorist Task Force officers wearing raid jackets.

A Raid Jacket is a garment typically worn by law enforcement officers and agents. It is similar to a baseball jacket in appearance but without the elasticated waist/collar and fastened with press studs.

== Gallery ==
Advert for Battledress

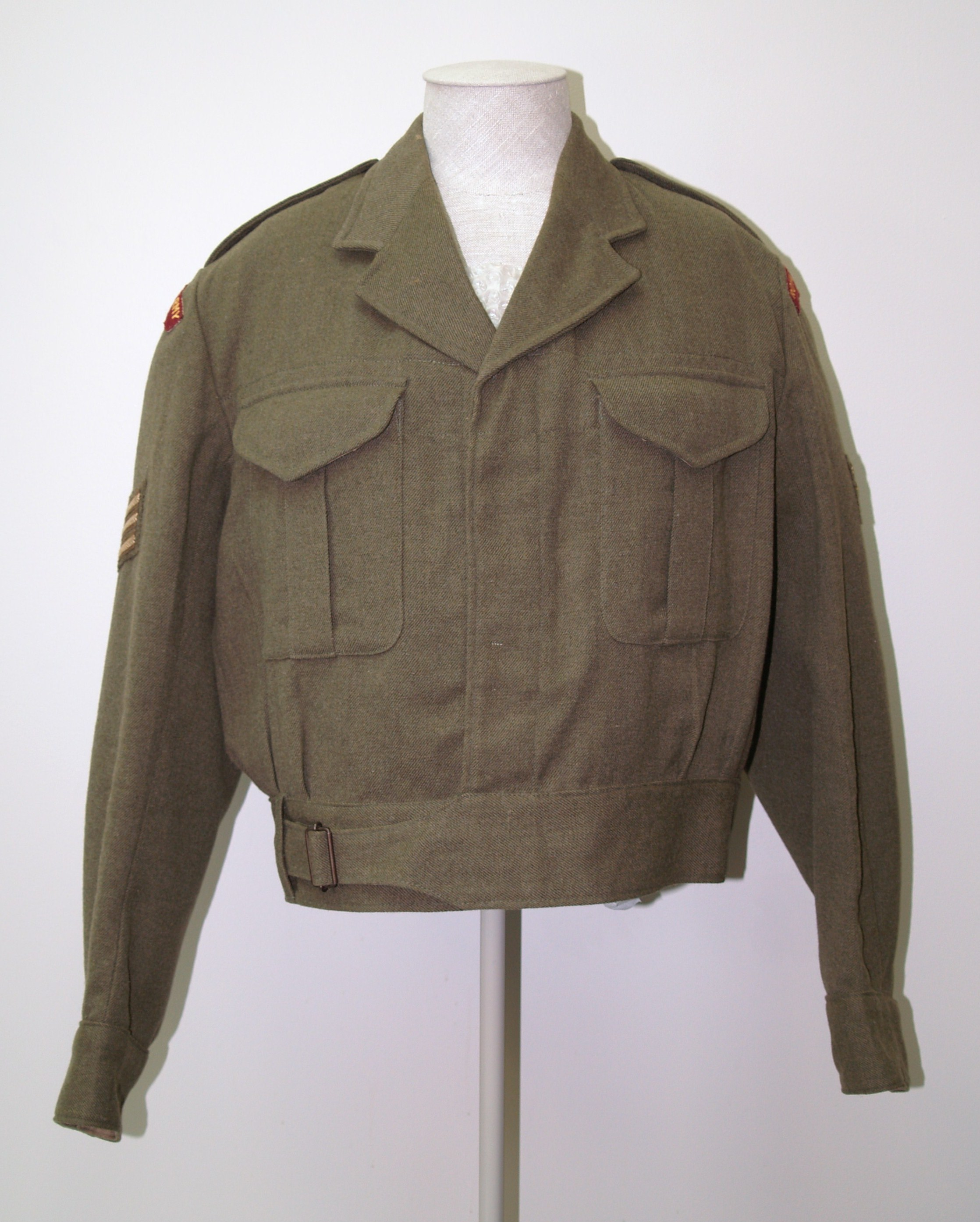
NZ issue Battledress jacket

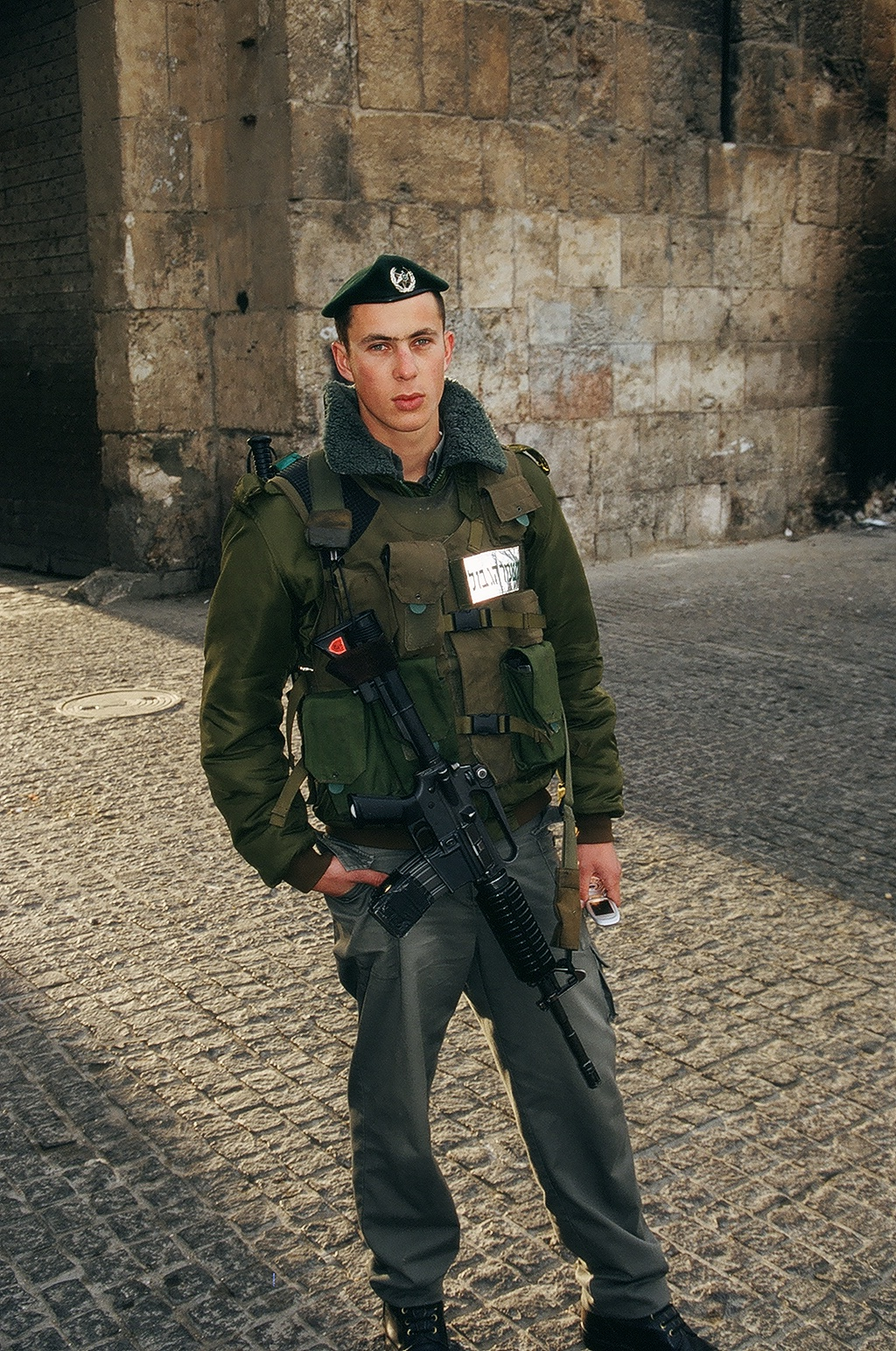
An Israeli Border Police soldier in a fur collared blouson

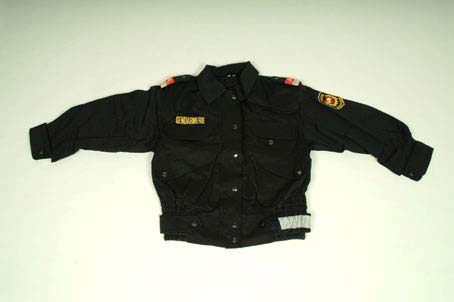
An Austrian Gendarmerie blouson

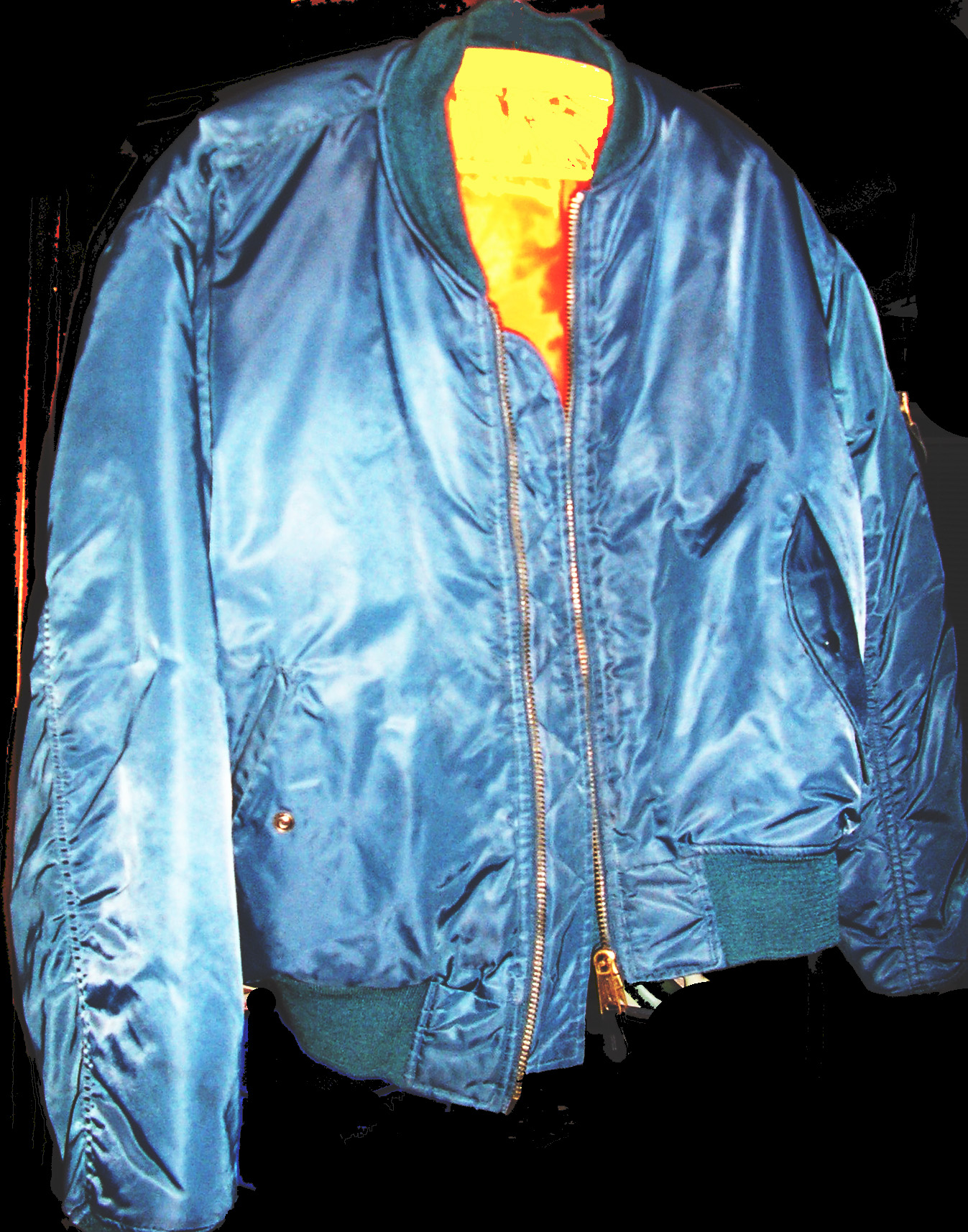
A modern fashion blouson/bomber jacket

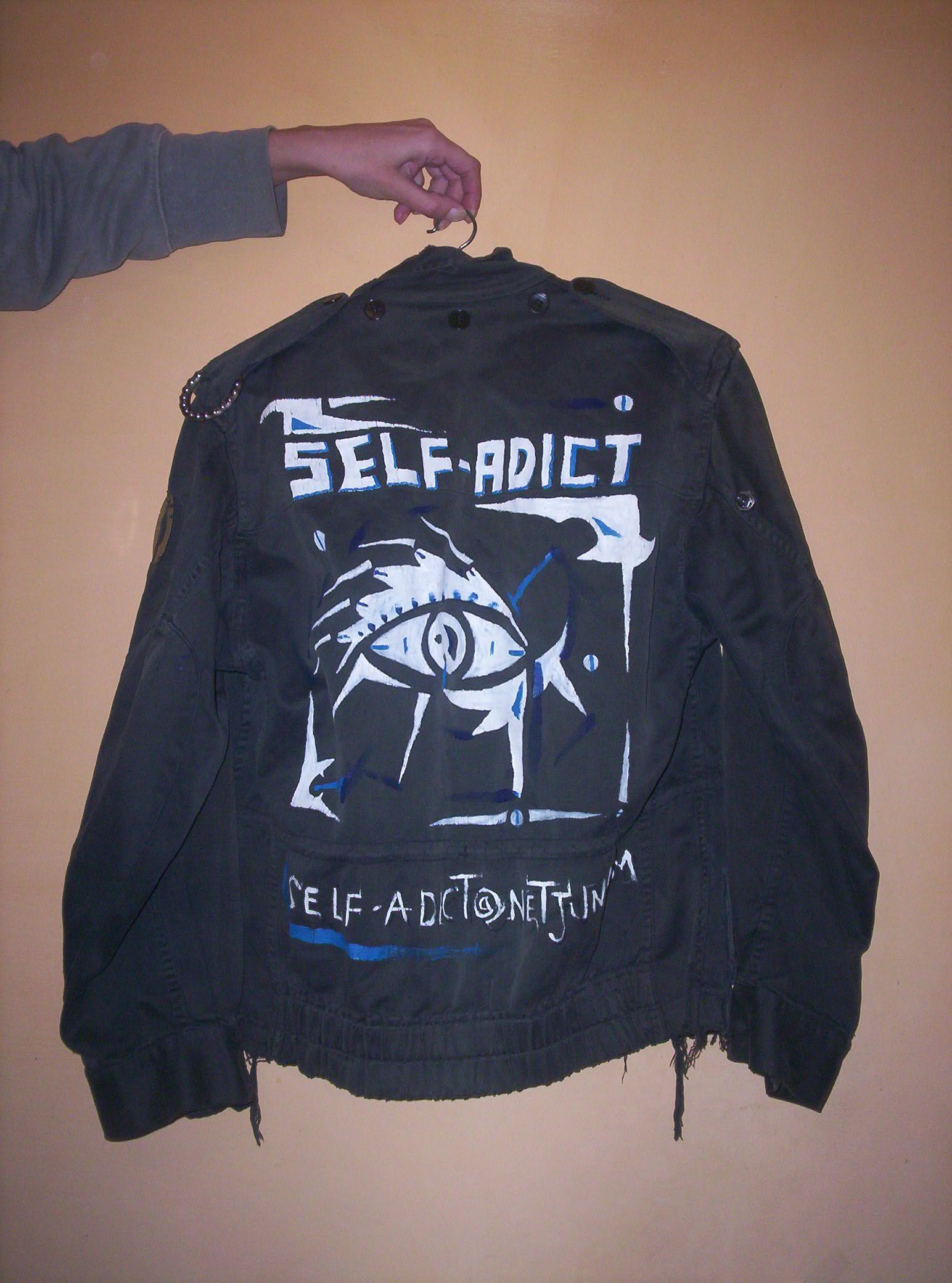
A punk style blouson

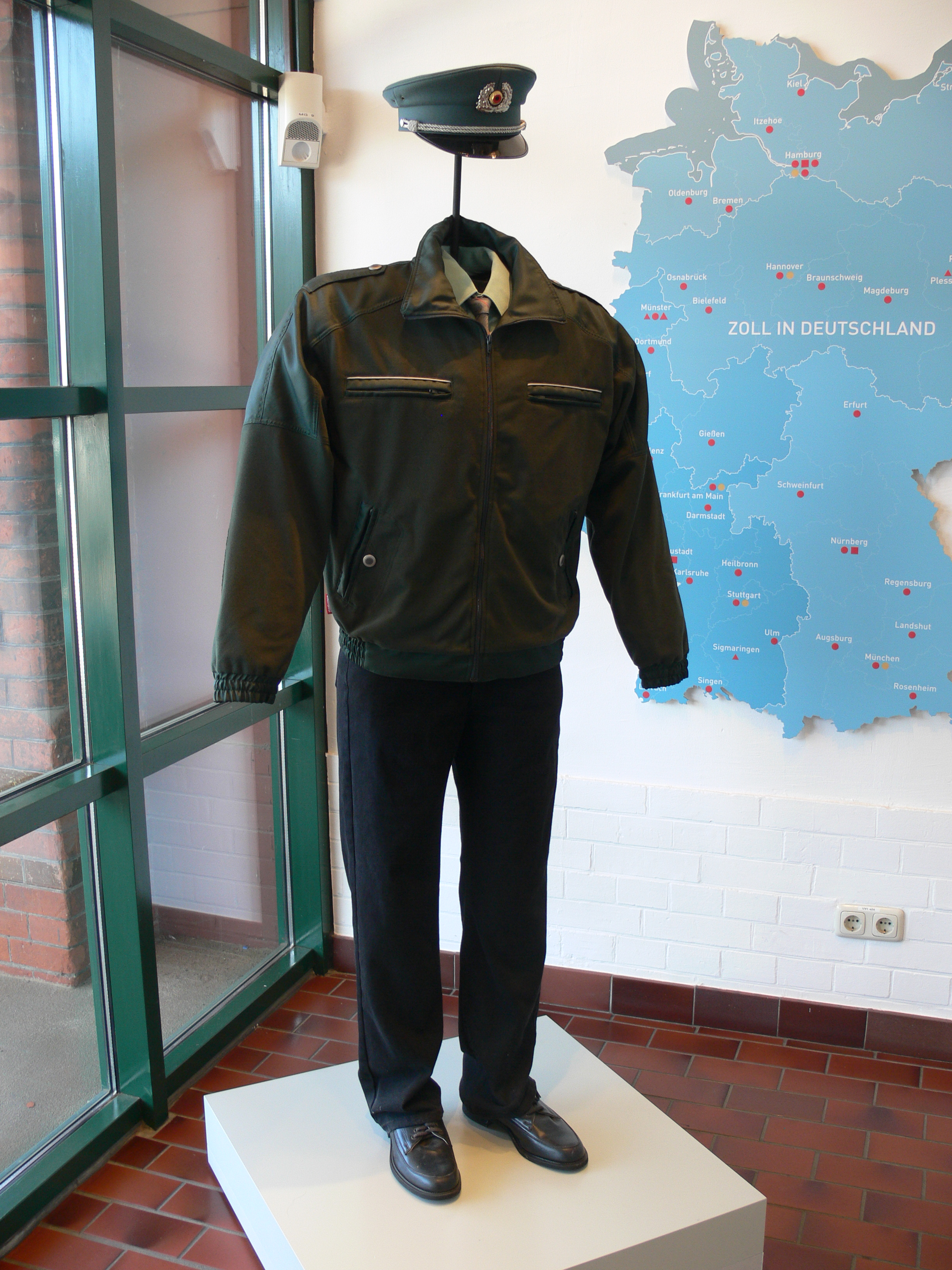
A Hamburg Dienstkleidung der Bundeszollverwaltung blouson
