= Goodwill Industries Building =

- U.S. National Register of Historic Places
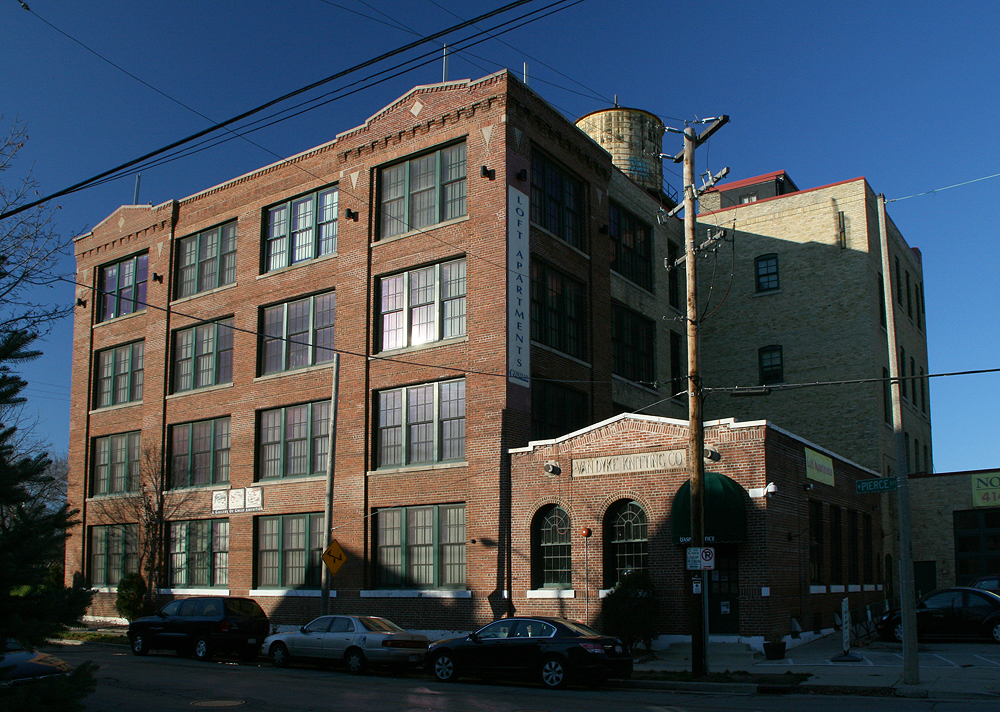
- Goodwill Industries Building
- Location: 2102 W. Pierce St. Milwaukee, Wisconsin
- Coordinates: 43.02452°N 87.9399°W
- Built: 1912
- Architect: Herman Esser
- NRHP reference No.: 04000714
- Added to NRHP: July 14, 2004

The Goodwill Industries Building is a former knitting factory in Milwaukee, Wisconsin where Oliver and Robert Friedman developed innovative rehab programs for the blind and mentally handicapped in the 1930s and 40s. The building was added to the National Register of Historic Places in 2004.

== History ==
The Van Dyke Knitting Company was a producer of "fine grade" ribbed underwear, founded in 1885 by a family of prominent Milwaukee lawyers, with a factory on S. Water Street. In 1913 the company built the four-story mill building, designed by Herman J. Esser. Over the years they added on, assembling most of the current complex by 1925. In the 1930s the company moved its manufacturing operation from Milwaukee to McComb, Mississippi.

Goodwill Industries bought the factory in Milwaukee the following year. Goodwill had started in 1902 as a mission project of Dr. Edgar J. Helms, a Methodist minister in South Boston. Helms aimed to provide training and employment for the disadvantaged and disabled. In 1910 his operation expanded from Boston nationwide. After 1915 the organization assumed the name 'Goodwill.'

Milwaukee Goodwill Industries was formed in 1917. Helms appointed Oliver Friedman executive secretary of the Milwaukee organization in 1921. Friedman built the organization to nearly a hundred by the mid-1930s. Milwaukee Goodwill had outgrown the vacant church it was operating from when the Van Dyke complex became available, and bought Van Dyke's plant in 1936. Over the years, Friedman developed the idea that Goodwill could provide more than employment. He envisioned the organization developing seven aspects of rehabilitation: physical rehab, mental and emotional rehab, spiritual guidance, vocational guidance and training, educational guidance, economic rehab, and social adjustment. In 1937 and '38 he started an Occupational Therapy Department within the Milwaukee Goodwill - the first such venture in any rehab organization in the U.S. In 1938 Friedman succeeded Helms as head of Goodwill Industries nationwide. During WWII the organization led salvage drives and fundraising efforts.

Robert Friedmann, Oliver's son, was named managing director of the Milwaukee unit in 1942. He pioneered jobs for blind and mentally handicapped people, connecting them with local companies that needed packing and assembly. He also started providing personal counselors who coordinated services customized for each worker.

In 1963 Goodwill moved to 6055 North 91st Street. Brill Bros. manufactured clothes in the plant until the late 1990s. In 2003 the building was converted to apartments.
