= MA-2 bomber jacket =

1950s United States military jacket

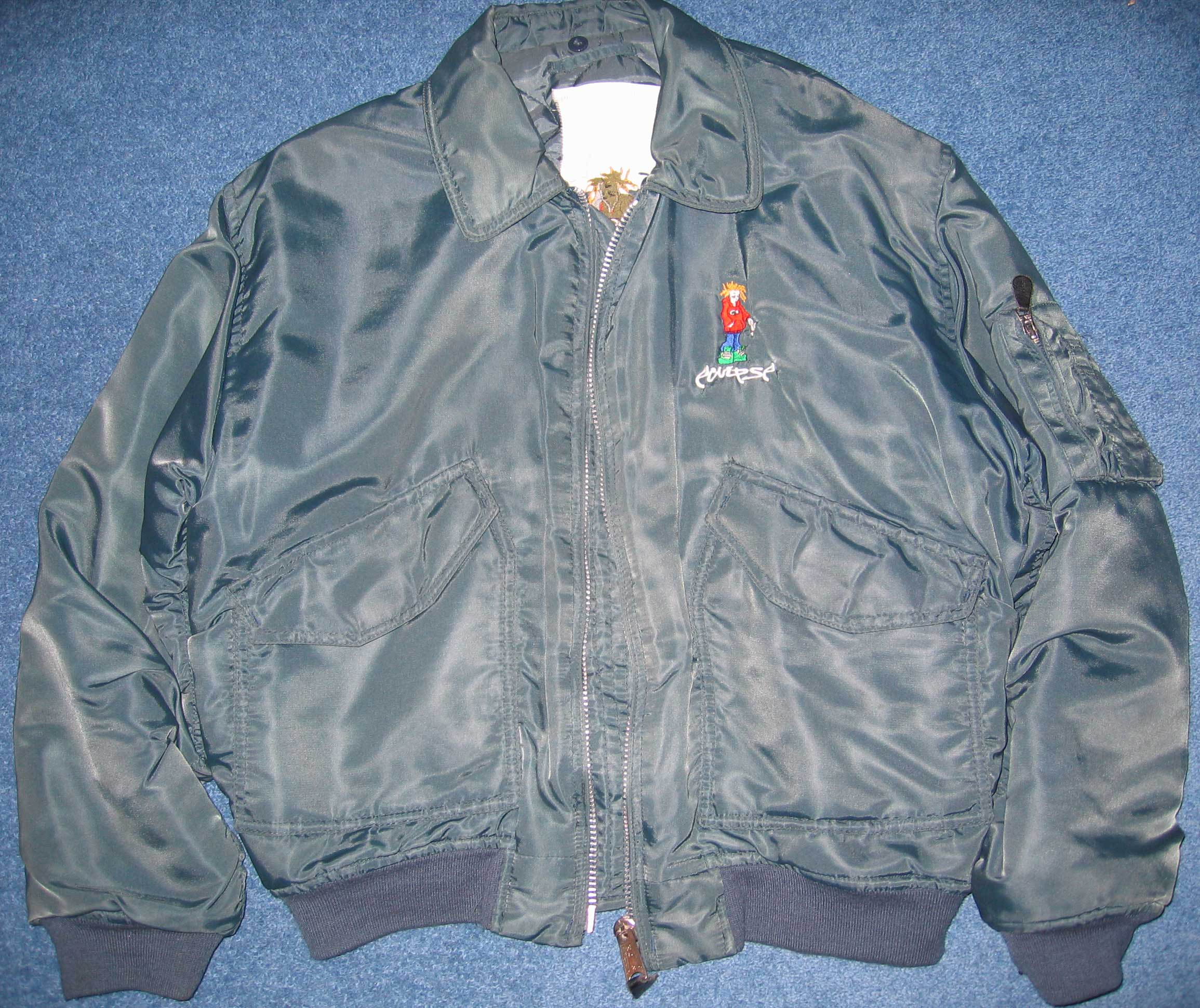
MA-2 bomber jacket with the large front cargo pockets

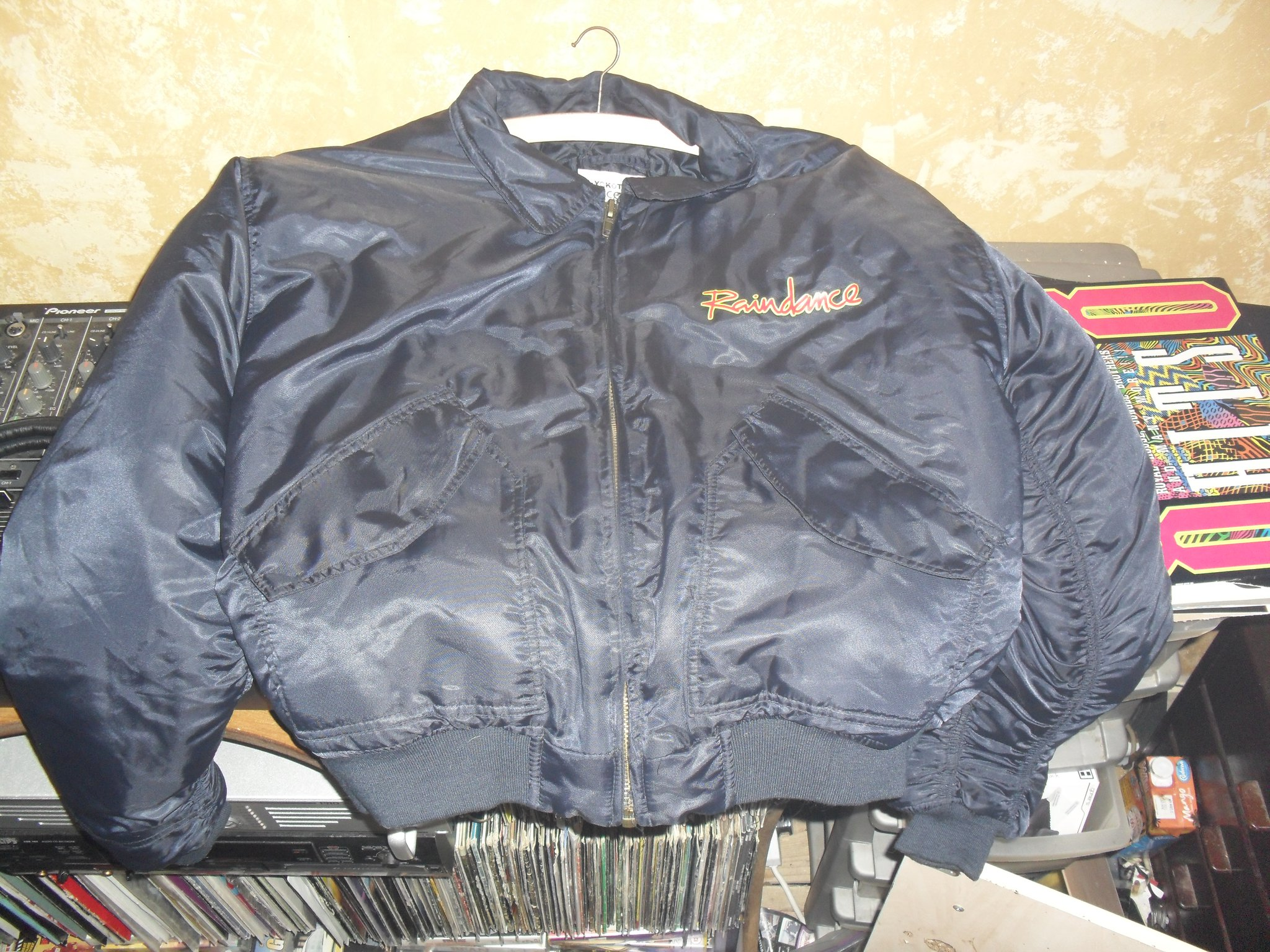
MA-2 bomber jack with Raindance logo

The MA-2 bomber jacket (also known as the MA-2 flight jacket or CWU-45 flight jacket) is an advanced version derived of the original MA-1 bomber jacket that was originally designed for the American military during the 1950s. CWU stands for "Cold Weather Uniform." The MA-2 is still being issued and used by the United States Navy and United States Air Force.

The term MA-2 was a trademark of the Cobles Clothing Company, adopted in the late 1980s when the CWU-45 military jacket started to gain popularity in street fashion. The term MA-2 has become so popular it is now used interchangeably with CWU-45 to represent this type of jacket.

There is also a lightweight version of this jacket, referred to as CWU-36.

== Design ==
The MA-2 has several design changes compared to an MA-1:

- Large cargo pockets are sewn onto the front of the jacket instead of the small slash pockets on the MA-1.
- A fold-down collar instead of the elasticated collar of the MA-1.
- The lining is usually not orange, but rather the same colour as the outer nylon.
- The sleeves join the back to allow easier movement.
- The cut is somewhat shorter; the hemline sits high on the waist compared to the MA-1.
- Genuine, military-issue CWU-45 and CWU-36 jackets (not the commercially available copies) are mostly made from the flame-resistant fabric Nomex, rather than the flammable fabrics used in earlier jackets.
- Genuine, military-issue Nomex CWU-45 and CWU-36 jackets have slightly larger and higher pocket openings.

== See also ==
- Bomber jacket
- Blouson
