= Boiled wool =

Boiled knitted or woven wool fabric

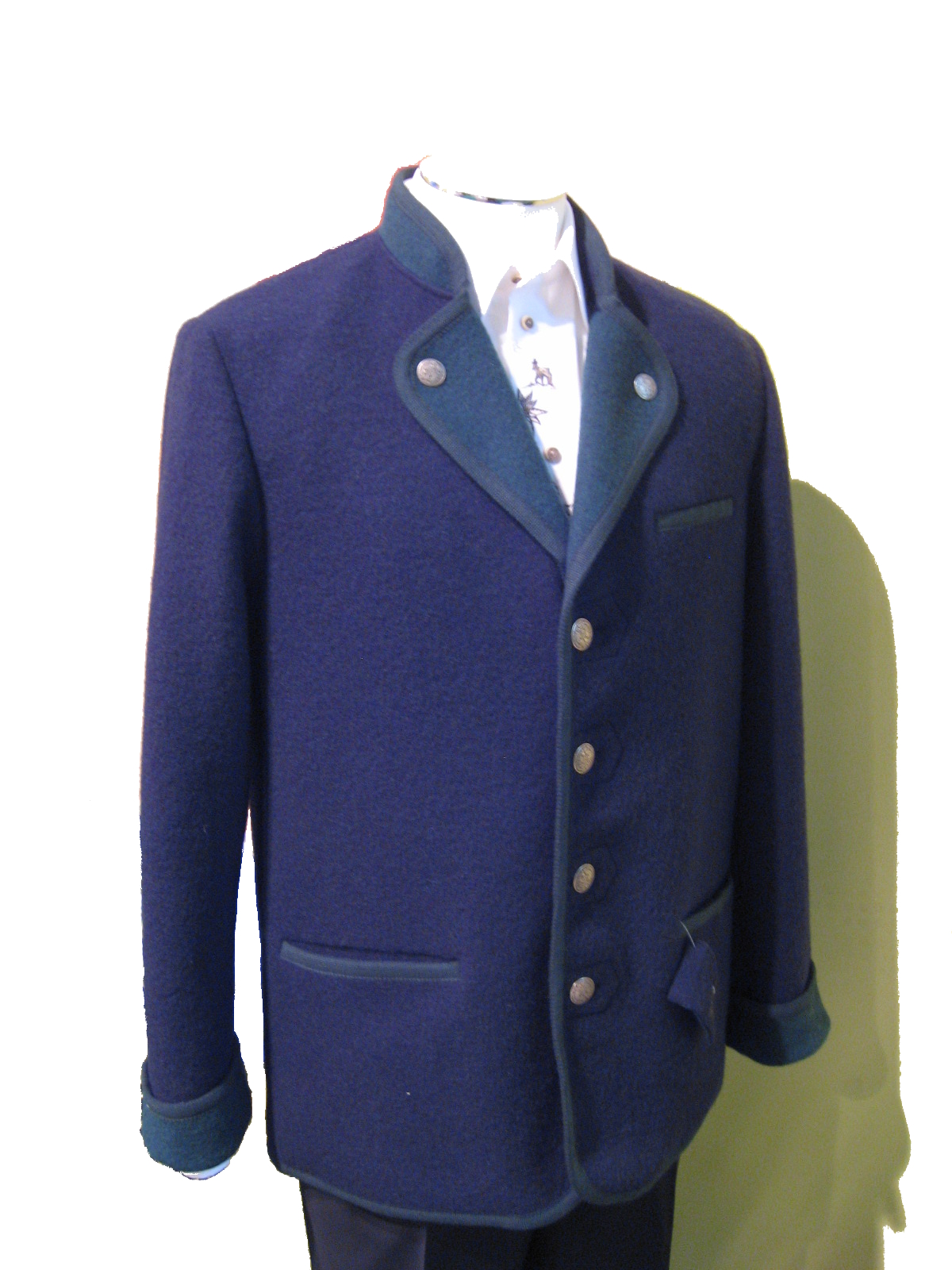

Boiled wool is a type of fabric primarily used in creating berets, scarves, vests, cardigans, coats, and jackets. To create this fabric, knit wool or wool-blend fabrics are agitated with hot water in a process called fulling. This process shrinks the fabric and results in a dense felted fabric that resists fraying and further shrinkage.

== Origins ==
Boiled wool is a type of felted wool, and is similar to non-woven wool felt. These processes date at least as far back as the Middle Ages. The word felt itself comes from West Germanic feltaz. Boiled/felted wool is characteristic of the traditional textiles of South America and Tyrolean Austria. It is produced industrially around the world.

== Process ==
Boiled wool fabric is created commercially by first knitting wool yarns to create a fabric of uniform thickness. The yarns and fabric may either be dyed or left natural, and the fabric may include designs or embellishments. After knitting, the fabric is fulled by boiling and agitating in hot water and an alkaline solution like soap. The agitation causes the scaly surface of wool fibers to stick together, producing a felted fabric. The result is a tighter and denser material that is up to 50% smaller in all directions than the pre-felted fabric. Boiled wool is warm, durable, and resistant to water and wind.

The general process of felting can be used to process non-woven fibers into pieces of felt used in industry, medical applications, and for crafts and costumes. This can be performed using a variety of fibers, including wool blends, rayon, polyester, and acrylic.

== See also ==
- Fulling
- Loden cape
