= A-2 jacket =

US WWII-era flight jacket

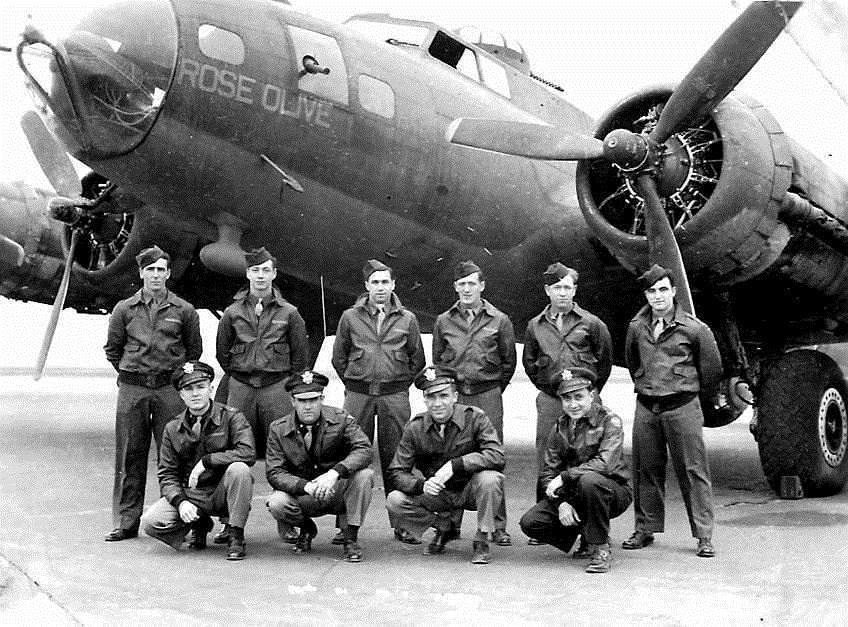
B-17 Flying Fortress Crew from 457th BG wearing their leather A-2 jackets

The Type A-2 leather flight jacket is an American military flight jacket closely associated with World War II U.S. Army Air Forces pilots, navigators and bombardiers, who often decorated their jackets with squadron patches and elaborate artwork painted on the back.

== History ==
The joint Army-Navy Standard AN-6051 - Jackets, Flying was used as the basis for the US Army Air Corps A-1 and US Navy 37J1 jackets, with each service identifying construction preferences in their own specification. The chocolate brown fully chrome-tanned sheepskin jacket, lined with brown cotton, was intended to replace the sweater for pilots as it was as warm as a sweater and formed a better windbreak. The A-1 jacket became Standard issue on 7-Nov-1927, but the chrome-tanned sheepskin A-1 was found not to be durable leading to the new A-2. On 8 Feb 1934 a Specification Notice stated AN-9061 Flying Jacket, A-1 was cancelled by the US Army and Navy.

The Type A-2 flying jacket was adopted as standard issue by the U.S. Army Air Corps on 9 May 1931, per specification number 94-3040 using illustrative Drawing 30-1415. Contrary to popular belief it did not supersede the A-1.

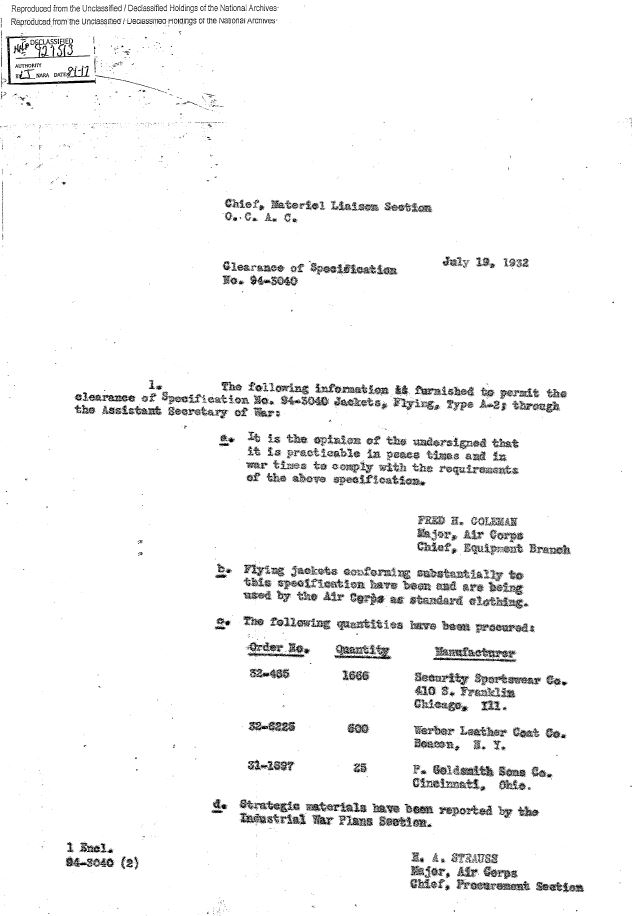
Paperwork showing the first three (3) A-2 flying jacket contracts, all using button pocket closure and made of horsehide leather with cotton lining.

The A-2 Specification lists the garment as "Jackets, Flying, Type A-2" (the original 9 May 1931 & cleared for general procurement 18 August 1932 specifications have identical wording). It originally used chrome tanned horsehide leather and all contracts used a cotton lining. Cowhide was approved for use 17 July 1940, beginning with Aero W535-AC-16160, and goatskin was added 10 March 1941, beginning with Rough Wear W535-AC-18091. All three leathers were chrome tanned per the three different leather specifications and any could be used after being approved for use.

Broadly similar in construction to the A-1, it replaced the A-1's buttoned front and pocket flaps with a zipper and hidden snap fasteners (although the first three A-2 contracts retained the pocket buttons). The A-1's stand-up knitted collar, which buttoned closed, was supplanted in the A-2 by a shirt-style leather collar, with hidden snaps at the points and a hook-and-eye latch at the throat. Stitched-down shoulder straps were also added to the design. Sizes were listed as ranging in even numbers from 32 through 54.

The A-2 was replaced by the AN6552 (AN-J-3) per an Authority for Change of Status Equipment document dated 24 May 1943, and declared "Limited Standard", meaning replacements were available in addition to the A-2. The April 1944 USAAF catalog for ordering supplies does not list the AN-J-3 as an option, but both the A-1 and A-2 are listed (the A-1 for $4.00 and the A-2 for $8.12). The Air Force never procured AN-J-3 or updated AN-J-3a jackets (likely due to severe leather shortages during most of 1943). The lack of goatskin AN-J-3a replacements may explain why three significant A-2 horsehide/cowhide contracts were granted in Dec. 1943, or after the A-2 jacket was officially superseded. Cowhide A-2 flying jackets were also purchased from Simpsons Gloves Pty. Ltd., Vic., Australia by the Department of the U.S. Army in 1942 and 1943. These Australian "V505" jackets have been shown to be used by some members of the U.S. Fifth Air Force.) Ultimately, there was no need for the Air Force to procure any AN-J-3a jackets given the large stock of A-2 jackets on hand. It wasn't until 26-Feb-1951 the A-2 specification was canceled and replaced by the MIL-J-6251 "Jacket Flying, Intermediate, Type B-15C". The timing helped make the A-2 into a very popular 1950's surplus jacket for another generation.

== Manufacturers ==
There were many manufacturers of A-2 jackets during the 1930s and 1940s whose product showed a wide range of quality, workmanship, and fit characteristics. All contracts used a cotton lining, though various replacements were made over the years. The first three (3) contracts had button pocket flaps, while all the rest were snapped pockets beginning with Werber order number 33-1729. Manufacturers included civilian clothing producers such as David D. Doniger & Co., makers of the popular MacGregor brand outerwear, as well as leather-goods companies like J.A. Dubow Mfg., whose chief peacetime product was baseball mitts. Rough Wear manufactured the A-2 under several different contracts, each varying slightly in color and style.

Since Mr Eastman's 2012 A-2 reference book, five more A-2 contracts have been found: The Rough Wear 42-1671P by John Chapman of Good Wear Leather Coat Co. fame, the 1943 V505 by Vintage Leather Jacket (VLJ) member @dinomartino1 and the Goldsmith 31-1897, Werber 32-6225, and 1942 V505 all by VLJ member @33-1729.

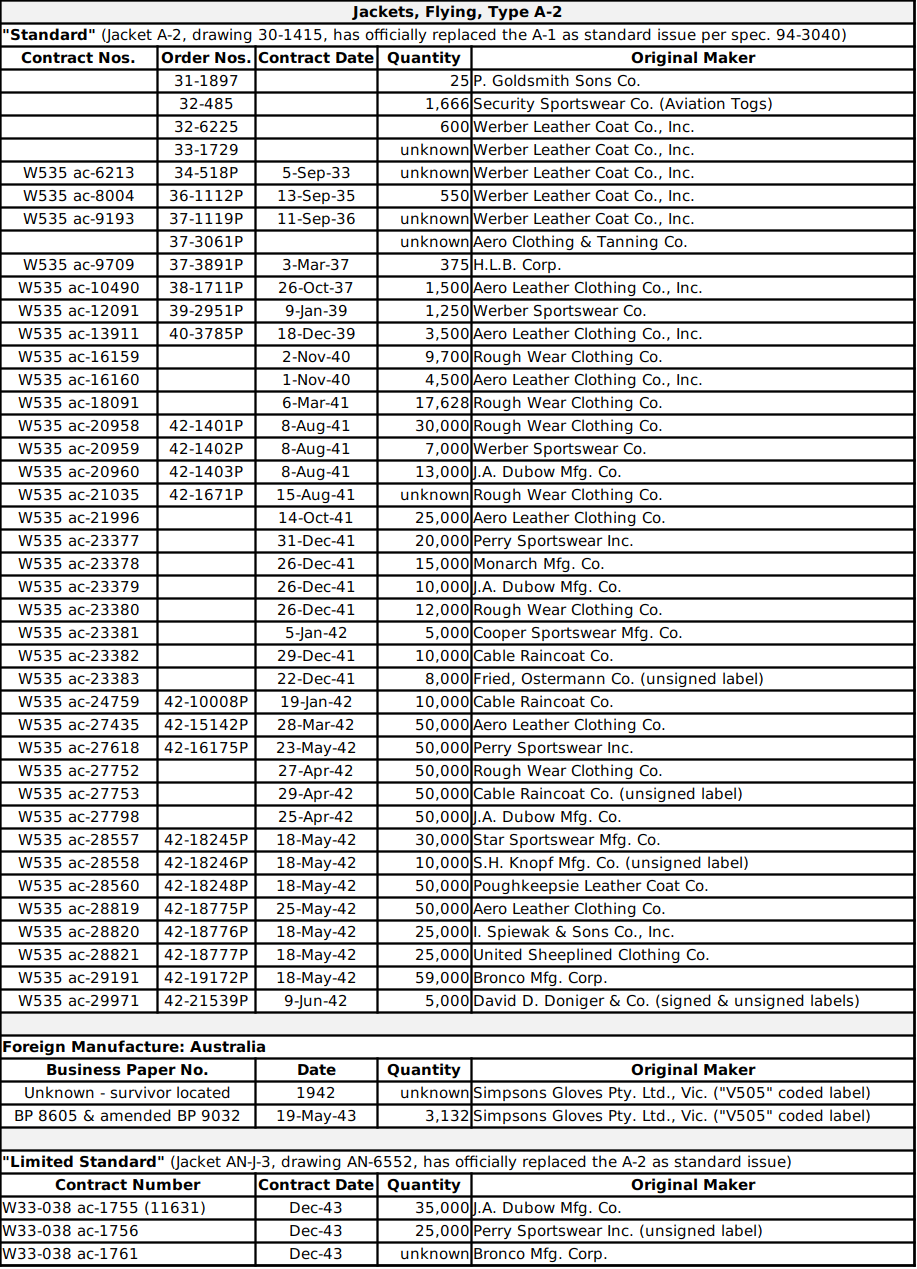

== Modern Air Force A-2 ==
With the exception of a very brief period from 1979 to early 1981 the U.S. Navy never stopped issuing its G-1 leather flying jackets to Navy, Marine, and Coast Guard flight crews. This meant that an entire generation of Air Force pilots and flight crews had missed out on an opportunity not lost to their Naval comrades.

Reviving the A-2 was an effort by the USAF to provide a visible symbol of the modern Air Force pilot. To support this effort, a new regulation was created to permit the wearing of A-2 flight jackets after 18 September 1987, the Air Force’s fortieth birthday. The Air Force was unsuccessful in locating the original 30-1415 drawing when they wanted to officially reintroduce the A-2, so they relied upon Avirex with Willis & Geiger Outfitters to create a new A-2 drawing. Avirex and Willis & Geiger Outfitters were not original A-2 manufacturers, but were chosen by the USAF as they were making civilian versions at the time.

31 Dec 1987 was the deadline for awarding the first A-2 contract of 53,000 seal-brown goatskin jackets and were to be delivered at a rate of 5,000 jackets per month. Cooper Sportswear Mfg., Co. of Newark, New Jersey won the first contract and had to source goatskin from Nigeria, Tasmania, and Pakistan as there was no source within the US that had a sufficient supply of goatskin for such a large contract. The first A-2 jacket deliveries began in May 1988, under contract 1988 DLA 100 88 C0420, using the "Saddlery" label.

Officers or enlisted personnel who were in mission-ready, emergency-mission-ready, mission capable, or mission-support billets assigned at or below wing level were permitted to wear the re-issued A-2, except with civilian clothing. The A-2 was only to be issued once, with the member permitted to keep it when they retire. Avirex Ltd., Branded Garments, Inc., and Cockpit USA, Inc. have been other suppliers of the A-2 re-issue.

== See also ==
- MA-1 bomber jacket
