= List of United States Air Force bands =

The United States Air Force Academy Cadet Drum and Bugle Corps

The United States Air Force has eleven active duty bands in support of Department of Defense and Department of the Air Force priorities, connecting to Air Force to the American public, supporting the warfighter through targeted deterrence, building partnerships and alliances, and supporting public affairs functions. As of April 1, 2024, all ANG Bands have been inactivated.

== Current military bands ==
=== Active duty bands ===
- United States Air Force Band
  - The Airmen of Note
- United States Air Force Academy Band
- United States Air Force Band of Flight
- United States Air Force Band of the Golden West
- United States Air Force Band of Mid-America
- United States Air Force Band of the Pacific
  - United States Air Force Band of Pacific-Asia
  - United States Air Force Band of Pacific-Hawaii
- United States Air Force Band of the West
- United States Air Force Heartland of America Band
- United States Air Force Heritage of America Band
- United States Air Forces in Europe Band
- United States Air Forces Central Command Band

=== Other bands ===
- United States Air Force Academy Drum and Bugle Corps

== Former bands ==
=== Army Air Force Bands ===
- 3rd Air Force Band
- 16th Air Force Band
- 501st Air Force Band
- 523rd Air Force Band (March AFB, CA)
- 524th Air Force Band (Sheppard AFB, TX))
- 525th Air Force Band (Sheppard AFB/Cannon AFB, TX)
- 526th Air Force Band (Sheppard AFB, TX)
- 547th Air Force Band (North Malir, Pakistan)
- 548th Air Force Band (Hollandia, New Guinea)
- 640th Army Air Forces Band
- 511th Army Air Force Band (Gulfport, MS)

=== Other bands ===
- United States Air Force Band of Liberty (541st Air Force Band)
- WAF Band (543rd Air Force Band)
- United States Air Force Pipe Band
- Band of the United States Air Force Reserve (581st Air Force Band), disbanded in 2012
- 502nd Air Force Band (Keesler AFB, MS)
- 505th Air Force Band (Chanute AFB, IL)
- 509th Air Force Band (Webb AFB, TX
- 515th Air Force Band (Bryan AFB, TX)
- 521st Air Force Band (F.E. Warren AFB, WY)
- 522nd Air Force Band (Ramey AFB, Puerto Rico)
- 523rd Air Force Band (March AFB, CA)
- 528th Air Force Band (Scott AFB, IL)
- 538th Air Force Band (Hunter AFB, GA)
- 539th Air Force Band
- Empire Band of The Air Force (544th Air Force Band)
- 545th Air Force Band (Lackland AFB, TX)
- 549th Air Force Band (Hill AFB, UT)
- 552nd Air Force Band (Roslyn ANG Station, NY)
- 573rd Air Force Band (Hamilton AFB, CA)
- 579th Air Force Band (Stewart AFB, NY)
- 583rd Air Force Band
- 589th Air Force Band
- 590th Air Force Band (McGuire AFB, NJ)
- 591st Air Force Band
- 600th Air Force Band
- 604th Air Force Band
- 626th Air Force Band
- 648th Air Force Band
- 683rd Air Force Band
- 695th Air Force Band
- Strategic Air Command Band (702nd Air Force Band)
- 724th Air Force Band
- 730th Air Force Band
- 745th Air Force Band (Barksdale AFB, LA)
- 746th Air Force Band
- 748th Air Force Band
- 751st Air Force Band
- 752nd Air Force Band (Elmendorf AFB, Alaska)
- 753rd Air Force Band
- 774th Air Force Band (Ladd AFB, AK)
- 775th Air Force Band
- 776th Air Force Band
- Air National Guard Band of the Central States (571st Air Force Band), under the 131st Bomb Wing
- Air National Guard Band of the Great Lakes "Triple Nickel" (555th Air Force Band)
- Air National Guard Band of the Gulf Coast (531st Air Force Band)
- Air National Guard Band of the Mid-Atlantic (553rd Air Force Band)
- Air National Guard Band of the Northwest (560th Air Force Band)
- Air National Guard Band of the Smoky Mountains (572nd Air Force Band)
- Air National Guard Band of the Midwest (566th Air Force Band)
- Air National Guard Band of the Northeast (567th Air Force Band)
- Air National Guard Band of the South (530th Air Force Band)
- Air National Guard Band of the Southwest (531st Air Force Band)
- Air National Guard Band of the West Coast (562nd Air Force Band)
- Air National Guard Band of the West Coast

== See also ==
- United States military bands
- Fleet Band Activities
