= SHAPE International Band =

Official military band of NATO

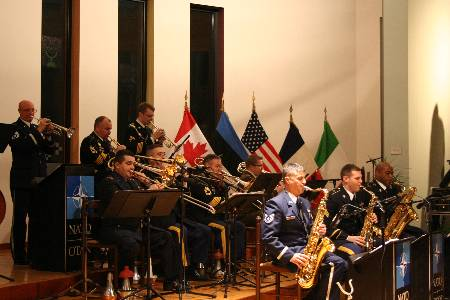
The band in 2011.

The SHAPE International Band is the organizational military band of NATO, subordinated to the Supreme Allied Commander Europe (SACEUR) from the Supreme Headquarters Allied Powers Europe headquarters in Mons, Belgium. It is composed of musicians of the United States Armed Forces as well as musicians from other allied countries. It has a size of 18 professional musicians under the direction of Chief Warrant Officer 4 Michael Franz from the United States Army.

== Overview ==
It descends from both the American Band of the Allied Expeditionary Force led by Major Glenn Miller and the Canadian Band of the AEF led by Captain Robert Farnon. The SHAPE Band was formed in the fall of 1983 with 15 volunteer performers being organized under the direction of Major Mike Sheehan from the UK Land Forces. Several allied nations began donating instruments that allowed the band to, by the end of 1984, give over 30 performances. At that time, the band consisted of both military and civilian volunteers. In 1985, General Bernard W. Rogers, the SACEUR at the time, declared the band as the official musical representative of NATO and SHAPE.

The band has been featured at events such as the Luxembourg International Military Tattoo and the Cork Jazz Festival. It performed at the first NATO Jazz Orchestra Concert in 2011.

== See also ==
- NORAD Band
