= MA-1 bomber jacket =

American flight jacket

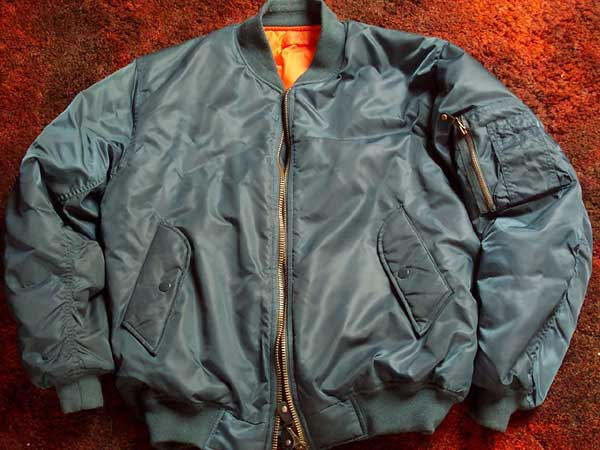
A modern MA-1 bomber/flight jacket, with sage-green exterior and safety orange lining

The MA-1 bomber jacket, also called the MA-1 flight jacket, is an American military jacket that was developed in the 1950s. The MA-1 and its predecessor, the B-15 flight jacket, were originally developed and needed at that time because the characteristics of the new jet aircraft created new requirements for pilot performance, safety, and comfort.

== History ==
Prior to the introduction of jet aircraft, fleece-lined leather jackets were issued to flight personnel. However, jet aircraft could operate at higher altitudes and encounter lower temperatures than propeller-driven aircraft. When leather jackets became wet from rain or perspiration, moisture could freeze at high altitudes, reducing their effectiveness in cold conditions. Jet aircraft also featured more streamlined designs, with cockpits containing additional equipment and limited space. Easier entry into and exit from cockpits became increasingly important for pilot safety. These requirements contributed to the development of lighter, insulated flight jackets.

To meet these needs, a new type of flight jacket was developed from the existing B-15 jacket, which was initially produced in cotton, but later produced in the same pattern but in high quality nylon. The B-15 had a wool collar with pile carried over from the earlier B-10 that was found to interfere with straps in practice. Nylon had been invented prior to World War II and used during the war for items such as parachutes, but was not used in flight clothing until after the war.

The first MA-1 jackets were issued to United States Air Force and Navy pilots and flight crews. Small numbers were also issued to Army flight personnel. MA-1 jackets first appeared in Europe in very small quantities in the mid-to-late 1950s probably on the black market and at sales of government surplus.

In 1963, Alpha Industries won the contract to manufacture the MA-1. More MA-1 jackets appeared in Europe as Alpha and later Rothco began to export MA-1 jackets and other military clothing to European Air Forces and commercial customers.

== Characteristics ==
The MA-1 was designed for use as an intermediate-weight flight jacket throughout the year. It was manufactured using nylon fabrics and polyester interlinings. Its lightweight construction allowed pilots to wear the jacket open in warmer conditions or zip it closed for additional protection against colder temperatures during flight. Upon entering the aircraft, the pilot could zip the jacket closed and be afforded ample protection against the cold conditions encountered in flight.

The MA-1 underwent design modifications during its long history of use but the original design has remained basically the same. The original design was contained in United States government military specification "MIL-J-8279." Changes to the jacket were periodically made by the Air Force because of the introduction of new textiles, new sewing techniques or new aircraft cockpit design. The military specification was amended to reflect the changes which was signaled by adding a letter to the Mil. Spec. For example, MA-1 specifications progressed from Mil-J-8279 to J-8279A, then J-8279B, J-8279C, et cetera. a significant revision" (if supported by a source), Mil-J-8279F, was issued in November 1978. The final revision before being phased out by the United States military is "Mil-J-8279G" and "Mil-J-8279G AMENDMENT-1", introduced in March 1988 and October 1990 respectively. These two final revisions were designated for ground crew only as fire-resistant CWU-36/P and CWU-45/P were issued to aircrew.

The MA-1 was produced in sage green, which was the same colour used on the earlier B-15D series of jackets. The B-15 and L-2 series of jackets had been produced in dark blue, but it was soon replaced by green. During the Korean War (1950–1953) mixing flight clothing from multiple time periods and colors was not unusual. The green was eventually adopted because it blended more easily with the environment should the pilot need camouflage protection on the ground. This was then incorporated in to the design of the MA-1. During the Vietnam War, there were variant commercial copies of MA-1 in camouflage pattern which were purchased by American servicemen. Official versions with a safety orange interior were reversible: interior pockets had snaps and could function when flipped to the outside, the front zipper had a large fob allowing zipping from either side. Downed or lost airmen hoping for rescue could reverse the jacket and reveal the bright high-visibility anti-camouflage orange as a locating-aid for their searchers. While no longer issued by the United States military, the MA-1 remains popular among many United States-allied armed forces (e.g. Israel, Japan, South Korea, Philippines, Taiwan (ROC) and Thailand).

== Civilian use ==
MA-1 jackets have become fashionable worldwide, especially in the United States, Japan and the United Kingdom. Many American clothing manufacturers, formerly military contractors now produce a variety of colors in addition to the traditional.

The MA-1 jacket is worn as winter outerwear in Europe and Australia. In North America, it is commonly referred to as a bomber jacket and is also worn in colder climates. The jacket is also worn in North America, where it is commonly known as a bomber jacket, especially in areas with cold weather. These jackets became popular in the late 1970s with punks, mods and skinheads. During the 1980s the jackets had extensive exposure in style magazines such as The Face and i-D, often reimagined by clothing designers of the period.

The MA-1 is also in use in several police forces and security agencies where cold weather is a part of everyday life. They were chosen over several other designs primarily for the sturdy construction and the heavy insulation needed in cold temperatures.

== See also ==
- Blouson
- Letter jacket
- MA-2 bomber jacket
- Valley Apparel L.L.C., an earlier manufacturer
