= Alpha Industries =

American clothing manufacturer

Alpha Industries Inc.
- Type: Private
- Industry: Clothing
- Founded: October 17, 1959; 66 years ago Knoxville, Tennessee, U.S.
- Founder: Samuel Gelber
- Headquarters: Chantilly, Virginia, U.S.
- Key people: Michael Cirker, CEO; Philip Kihlagard; Bogdan Colakovíc
- Products: Jackets, vests, pants, and casual apparel
- Website: www.alphaindustries.com

Alpha Industries Inc. is an American clothing company founded in 1959 in Knoxville, Tennessee. Alpha Industries specializes in American military style and fashion apparel items such as flight jackets. It has produced the M65 Jacket for the US military for over half a century.

== History ==
=== Superior Togs Corporation ===
Alpha Industries started in a Valley Apparel L.L.C., a family of companies including Superior Togs Corporation, Rolen Sportswear and Dobbs Industries. Through the 1940s, these companies were linked by common ownership and an identical business of manufacturing flight jackets for the United States military.

In January 1948, Robert Lane and his wife Helen incorporated Superior Togs Corporation in order to manufacture flight jackets for a United States Department of Defense contract.

In 1952, Superior Togs Corporation was shut down after the government suspended the contract. Lane set up a new company called Rolen Sportswear, an equivalent of Superior Togs, but under a different name. They picked up the same United States Department of Defense (DOD) contracts and used the same Elizabeth, New Jersey factory.

By 1957, Lane created Dobbs Industries in Knoxville, Tennessee where labor was plentiful and manufacturing costs were substantially less.

=== Creation of Alpha Industries ===
In 1959, Lane faced accusations of bribing a government official for a Department of Defense contract, resulting in a ban on his business and any associated companies from obtaining future government contracts. Samuel Gelber, Lane's accountant, parted ways with him and turned to Herman "Breezy" Wynn, founder of Wynn Industries Group. Despite holding 90% of Dobb Industries' shares, this marked the end for Gelber. Wynn's expertise in the textile industry and his resources allowed Gelber to establish Alpha Industries, which he incorporated on October 17, 1959, in Knoxville, Tennessee.

Alpha Industries began making military clothing in the basement of a rented Knoxville factory using leased sewing machines and only a few employees. The Department of Defense contracts initially took a lot of work to secure in peacetime. The start of the Vietnam war meant a sudden increase in demand for military clothing, and Alpha's growth rapidly accelerated.

In 1963, Alpha Industries started to produce the MA-1 bomber jacket.

=== Vietnam War ===
Wynn Confederation companies' worker collaboratively through subcontracts and affiliations in which DOD contract manufactures would lease sewing machinery to other companies within the Confederation, source fabrics and components, provide technical assistance, and train employees.

With America's escalating involvement in Vietnam starting in the 1960s, Alpha found themselves inundated with work. Alpha expanded considerably over the decade and soon occupied all four floors of the 614 11th Street factory. John Niethammer joined the company for quality control and became a significant player in Alpha's expansion.

When the Vietnam War ended, Alpha made the rounds through army surplus stores.

In 1970, Alpha Industries started to cater to the consumer market. In the 1970s, the Department of Defense deemed it necessary to equip every man with separate clothing for every possible weather scenario they could encounter. This meant a busy period for manufacturers like Alpha. Because DOD contracts were given preferably to small companies, Alpha did not want to risk increasing its employment to more than 500 workers, so new subcontracting groups were created, like Summit Apparel and Benton Manufacturing. With a move to a larger factory in 1980, Alpha was able to devote whole buildings to single types of jackets. The new factory saw the production of 550,000 field jackets per year.

=== End of Cold War ===
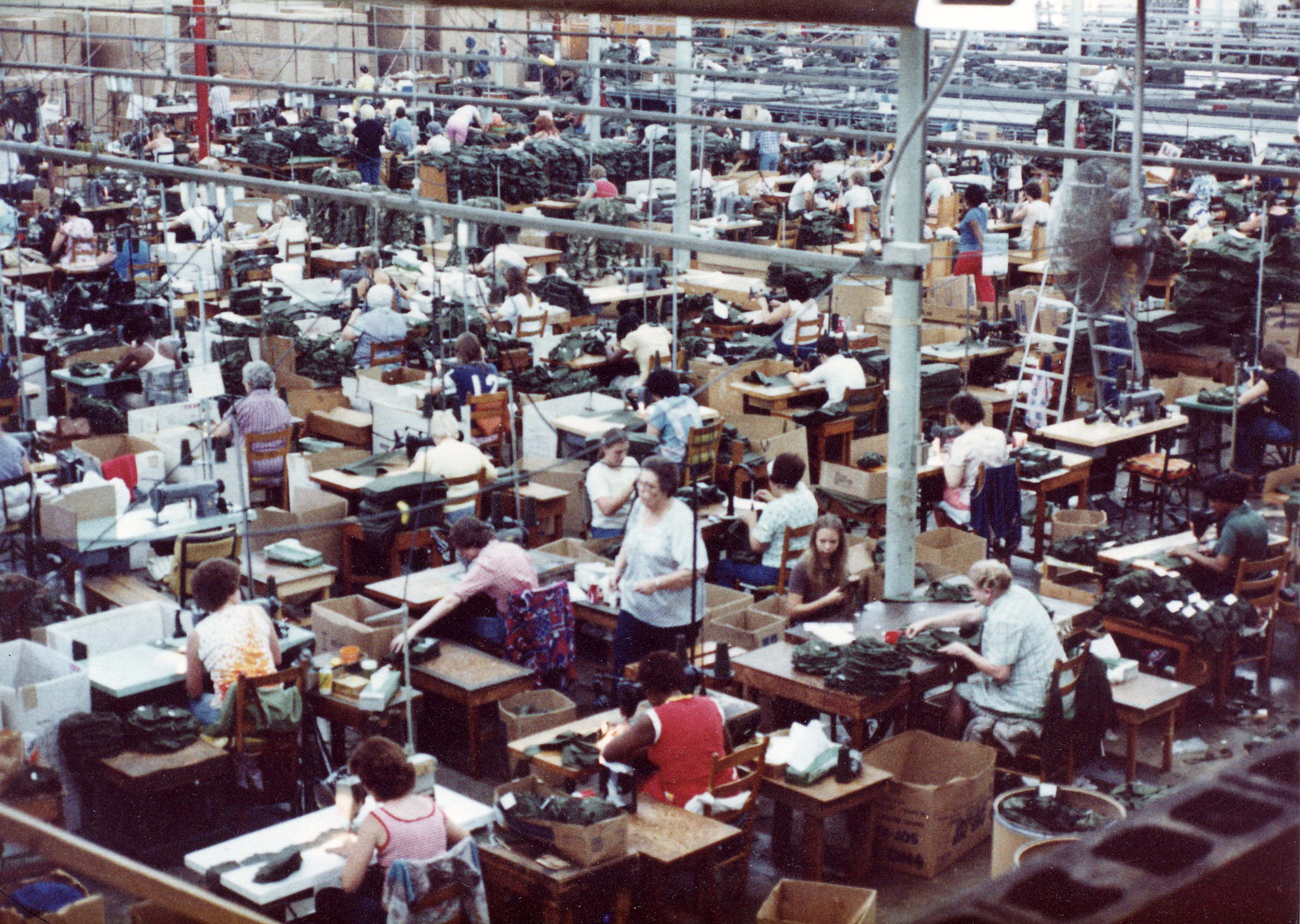
The floor of the Knoxville, Tennessee factory during the 1980s

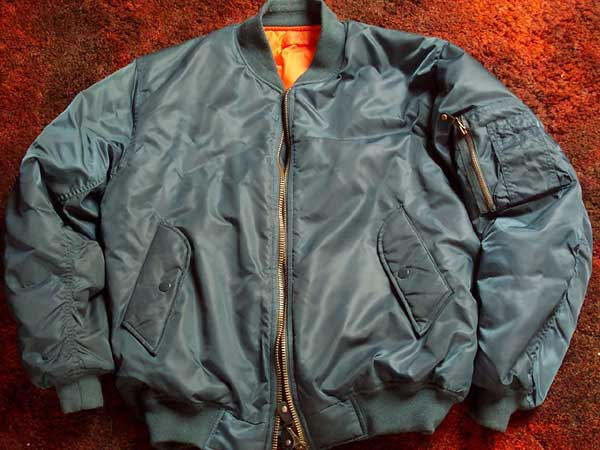
MA-1 Bomber Jacket

Alpha soon began to sell commercially. By this time Alpha had dabbled in commercial sales in between DOD contracts through subcontracted groups such as Dobbs Apparel.

In 1982, Samuel Gelber died at the age of 67 and left the company to his wife Mildred with the assistance of John Niethammer and her son-in-law Alan Cirker. The new management expanded the commercial side of its business.

The Reagan administration called for an increase in DOD spending which exceeded 1.8 billion dollars in textile alone. Alpha became the leading producer of the new CWU 36/P and 45/P Nomex flight jackets which replaced the MA-1 bomber jacket, and the Gore-Tex systems which replaced the parkas.

By the mid-1980s Alpha found that some of their products were envied by foreign military groups and were recommended to military attachés by the United States Defense Logistics Agency (DLA). In deals that required foreign groups to purchase through American manufacturers, Alpha found itself with new customer bases in other countries.

The end of the Cold War brought the Peace Dividend and by the early 1990s, DOD spending had decreased by 75%. Liberalization of trade barriers and a reduction of duties also led to a breakdown in the American apparel industry. Those factors highly threatened to end Alpha Industries. The Gulf War and Iraq War did not noticeably increase the demand for military apparel. The military's focus became on technology and electronics that would reduce the use of human life. Therefore, Alpha turned more and more to the commercial sale of its products.

== Recent history ==
Alpha Industries is currently a manufacturer of military style apparel with customers ranging from U.S. surplus to stores across Europe and Asia. Alpha now creates replicas of famous military wear as well as casual clothing that is military-inspired. Children's clothing and accessories are also made by Alpha Industries.

In 1992, the brand switched to the flying A logo to adapt to the internationalization of their sales. During the latter decades of the 20th century Alpha produced clothing for military organizations throughout the world including Argentina, Australia, Belgium, Chile, Ecuador, The Netherlands, Jordan, Papua New Guinea, Saudi Arabia, Singapore, Taiwan, and Uruguay.

Alpha has expanded into networks of international distributors, retailers, and internet sellers. Supplementing its small American factory base (still located in Knoxville), Alpha has expanded its range of manufacturing outside of the United States. Much of their product is made in China.

In 2008, Alpha Industries started to partner with other clothing brands to release new lines of products.

In 2011, Michael Cirker replaced his father as CEO of Alpha Industries. While the father Alan had focused on international distribution, the son Michael turned Alpha into a fashion brand.

== Collaborations ==
In October 2020, Alpha Industries partnered with A Bathing Ape on garments with dual branding of patchwork, embroidery and other streetwear textures.

The brand has collaborated with Imogene + Willie on military-inspired workwear.
