= Uniforms of the United States Air Force =

Standardized military uniforms worn by airmen of the United States Air Force

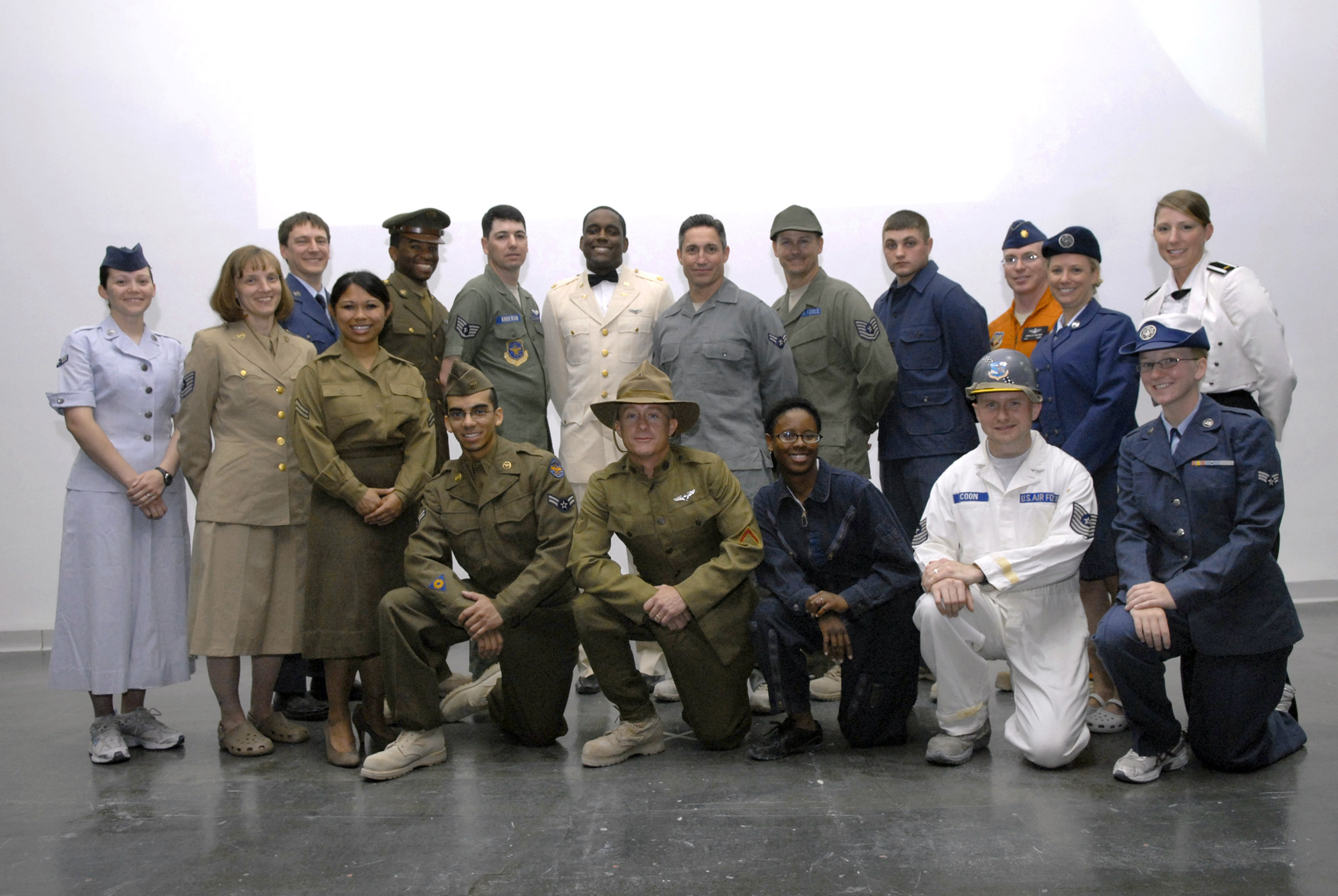
Air Force uniform variations through the years

The uniforms of the United States Air Force are the standardized military uniforms worn by members of the United States Air Force to distinguish themselves from the other services.

== History ==
=== Early designs ===
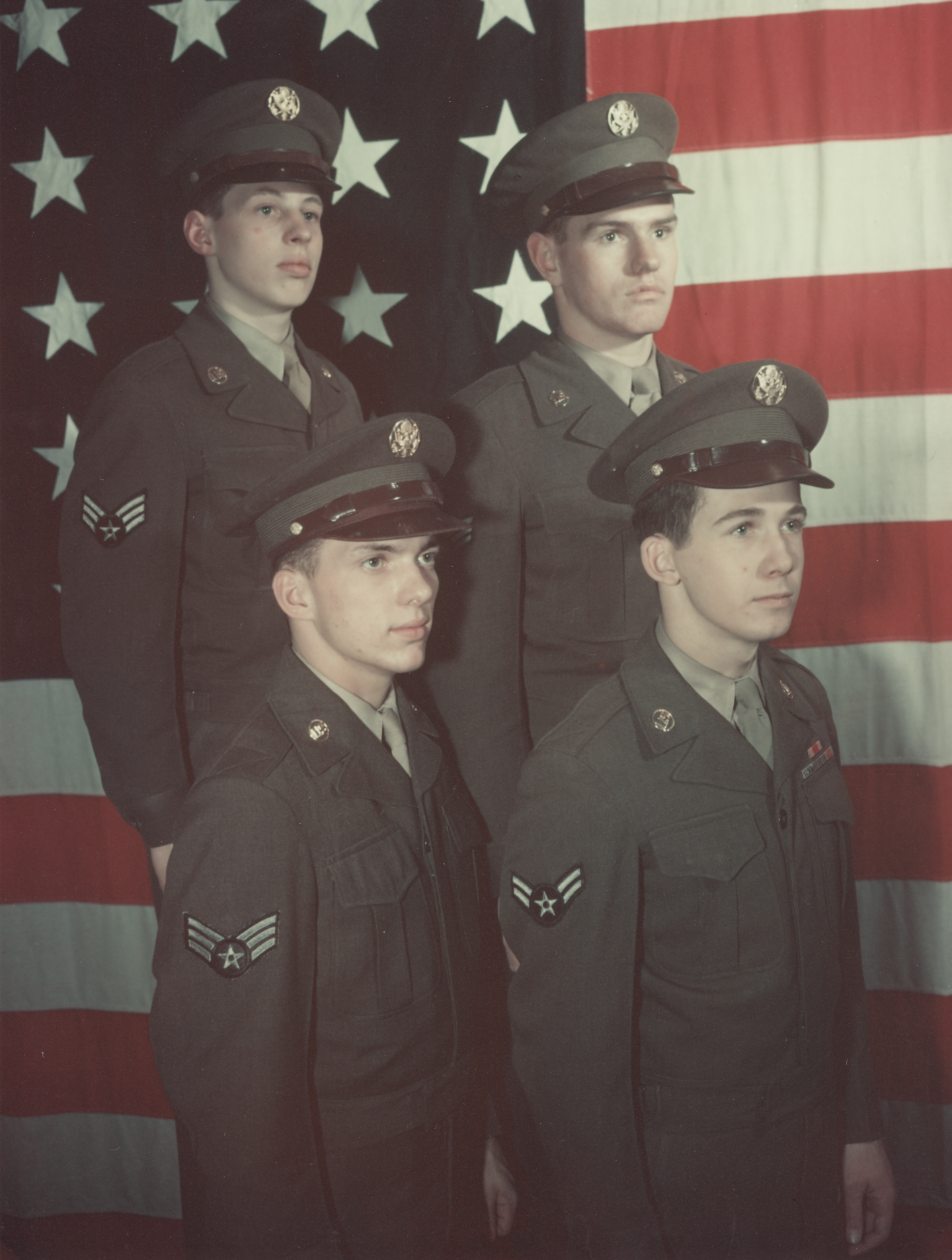
Army uniform used by U.S. Air Force after 1947, with airman rank insignia attached to the uniform.

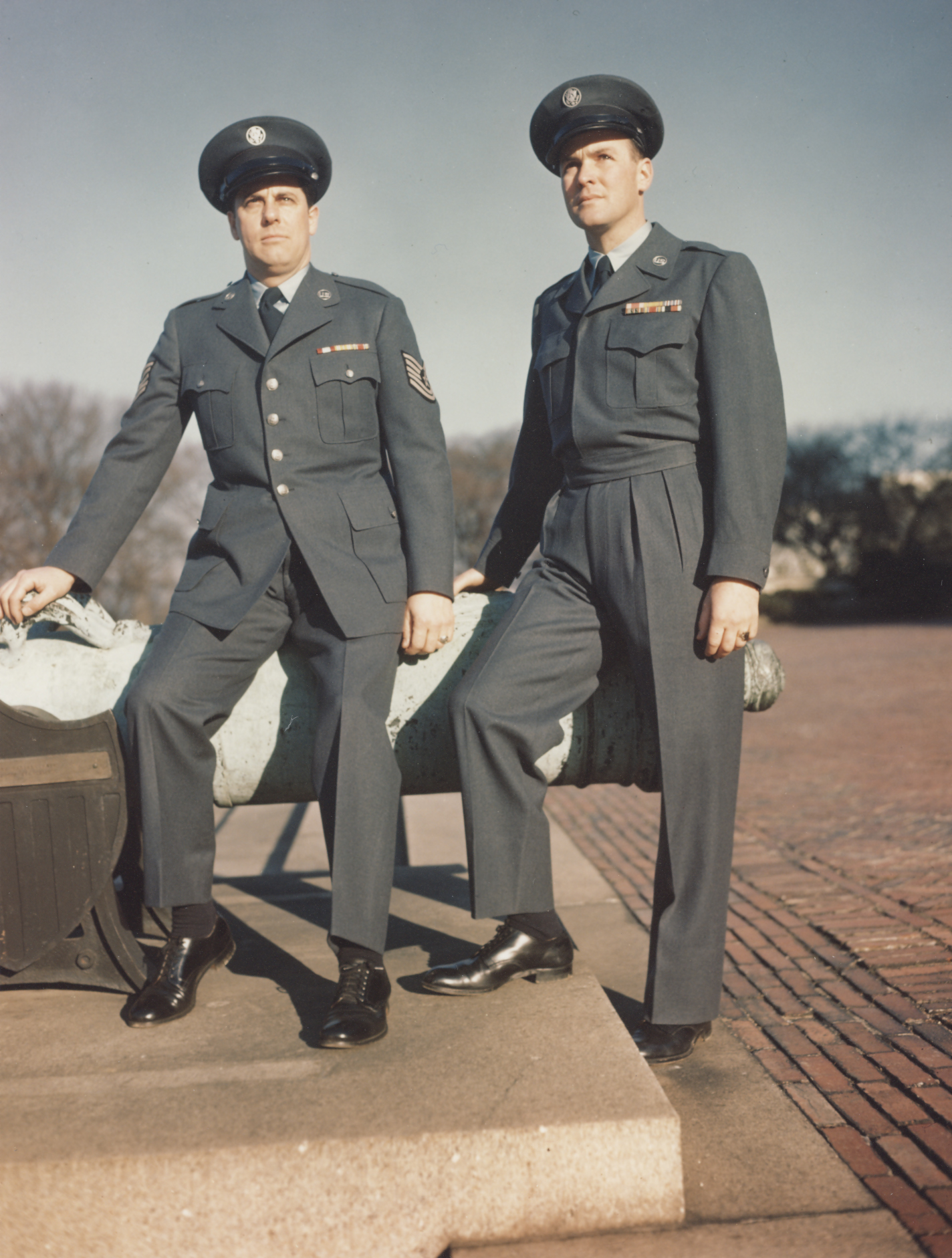
First distinctive blue service uniforms for the U.S. Air Force in early 1950s

When the U.S. Air Force first became an independent service in 1947, its members initially continued to wear green U.S. Army uniforms with distinct badges and insignia. The Air Force adopted redesigned enlisted rank insignia in 1948 to further distinguish themselves. These uniforms were worn with polished black leather accessories instead of the russet brown leather previously used. These continued to be issued until the extensive stocks were either transferred to the Army or depleted, leading to the green uniforms being seen into the early 1950s.

The first Air Force-specific blue dress uniform, introduced in 1949, was in Shade 1683, also dubbed "Uxbridge Blue" after the former Bachman-Uxbridge Worsted Company. It was cut similarly to Army service dress uniforms, with a four button front and four coat pockets. Replacement of polished brass devices with oxidized silver ones and lack of sewn unit insignia on the dress uniform were designed to reduce needless tasks and present a sleeker appearance. An Eisenhower jacket, also inherited from the Army Air Forces but in Shade 1683, was an optional uniform item; it was phased out by 1965. In the early 1960s, the blue uniform transitioned to a slightly updated version in Shade 1084. The shades were updated again in the 1970s, with the coat and trousers becoming Shade 1549, while the light blue shirt became Shade 1550.

In 1966, a long sleeve winter blue shirt with epaulets was introduced. Epaulets were unadorned, with officers wearing small rank insignia on the collar and enlisted personnel sewn-on cloth insignia on the sleeves. In the early 80s, the soft rank epaulets from the light blue shoes were authorized for officers and senior NCOs. Members would cut the thread holding the epaulets down to place the rank. These would be phased out 30 September 1988.

Tan summer service dress uniforms for officers, nicknamed "silver-tans" for the sheen of their Shade 193 color, saw use into the mid-1960s, while a brief-lived enlisted version which included a cotton bush jacket was introduced in 1956 and discontinued in 1965. Tan short-sleeve cotton shirts and trousers for men, known as 1505s after their shade, continued in use until the early 1970s, while women wore light-blue combinations. In the early 1970s, a version of the blue service uniform with a short-sleeve shirt replaced these, as the blue uniforms became the single form of service dress.

A short-lived "ceremonial blue" uniform and "ceremonial white" uniform was also implemented in the mid-1980s and discontinued by 1 August 1994 and 1 March 1993 respectively. Mandatory for field grade officers and above, the blue version was identical to the blue service uniform with the exception of silver metallic sleeve braid replacing the dark blue mohair sleeve braid and hard "shoulder board" insignia from the officer's mess dress uniform worn in lieu of large metal rank insignia. The white uniform was identical in cut and style to the blue version and also incorporated the metallic sleeve braid and shoulder board rank insignia.

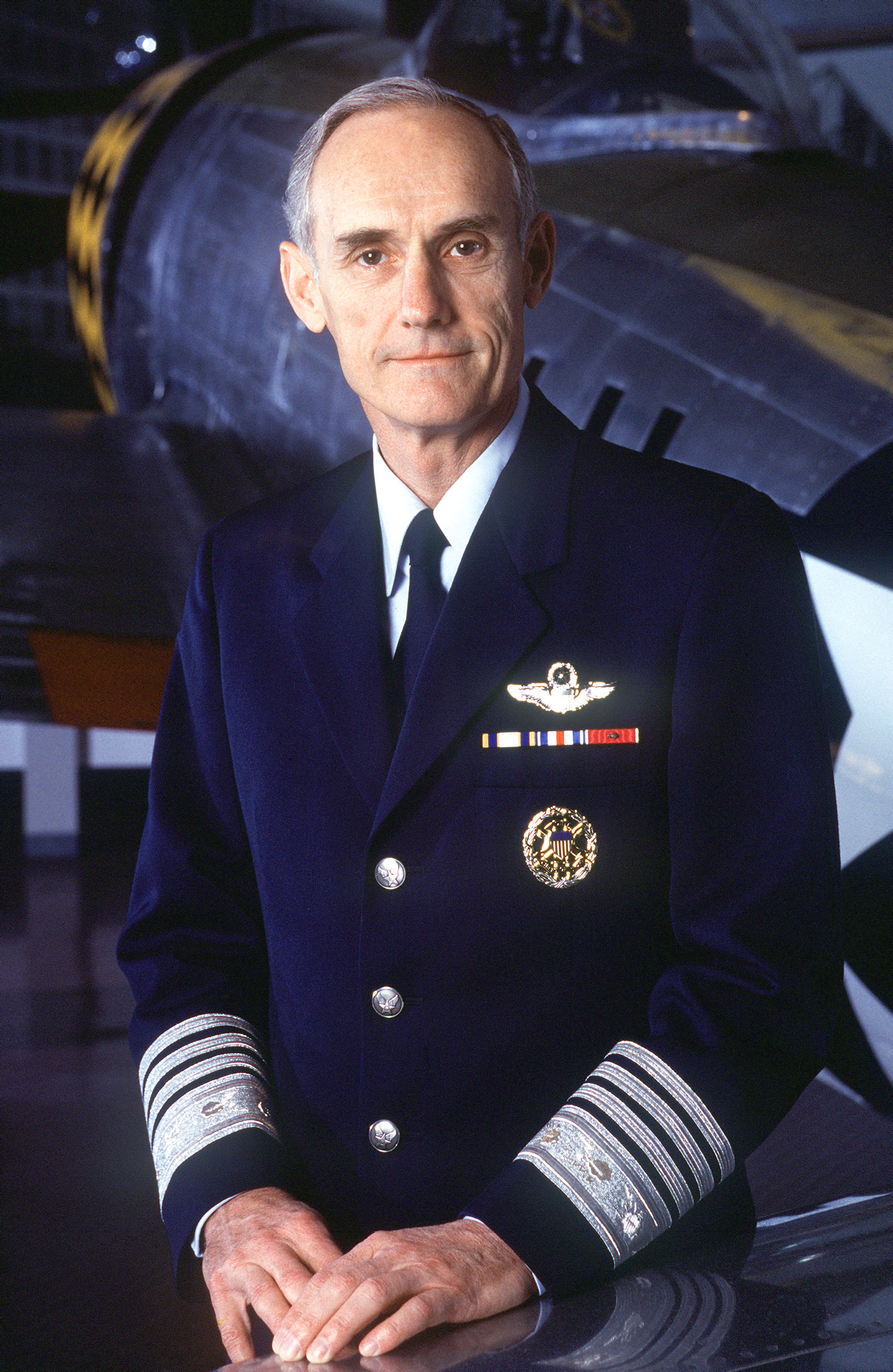
Merrill McPeak wearing the short-lived uniform redesign he introduced as Air Force Chief of Staff, 1993

In 1993, then Air Force Chief of Staff, Merrill McPeak introduced a new three-button service coat which featured no epaulets and silver sleeve braid loops on the lower sleeves denoting officer rank (see also: United States Air Force officer rank insignia). This style of rank insignia for officers, while used by British Royal Air Force officers and other air forces inspired by their uniforms, was unpopular and many senior Air Force generals commented that the uniforms of the Air Force now looked identical to those of commercial airline pilots. Epaulettes were put back on the coat for metal officer rank insignia and blue braiding returned to the bottom of the sleeves, in the style of the previous four-button, four-pocket coat worn prior to the adoption of the three-button coat. As of 2020, this remains the coat used as part of the service dress blue uniform.

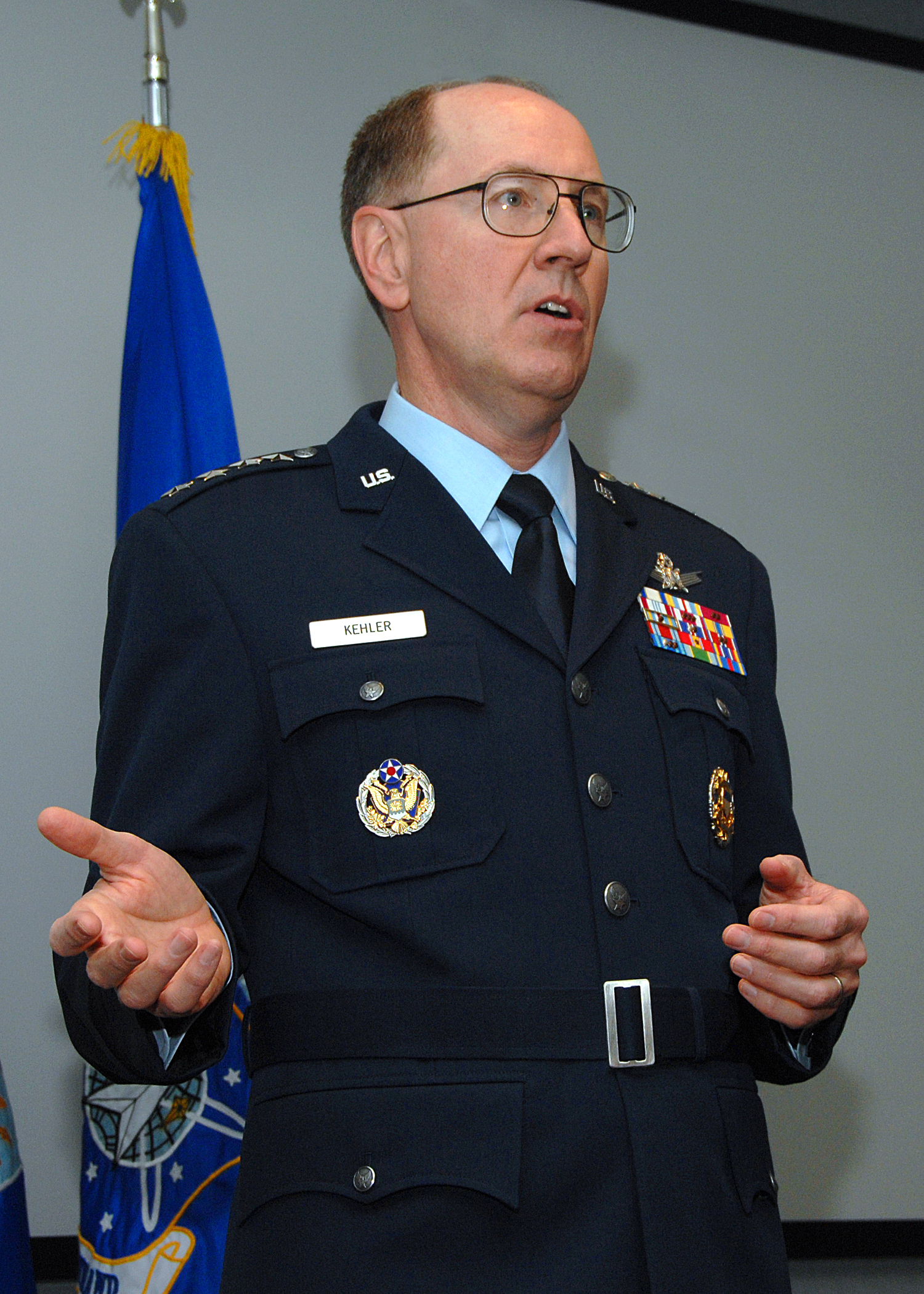
Gen. C. Robert Kehler models a test version of the proposed Air Force service dress

On 18 May 2006 the Department of the Air Force unveiled two prototypes of new service dress uniforms, one resembling the stand-collar uniform worn by U.S. Army Air Corps officers prior to 1935, called the "Billy Mitchell heritage coat," and another, resembling the U.S. Army Air Forces' Uniform of World War II and named the "Hap Arnold heritage coat". In 2007, Air Force officials announced they had settled on the "Hap Arnold" look, with a belted suit coat. However, in 2009, General Norton Schwartz, the new Chief of Staff of the Air Force, directed that "no further effort be made on the [Hap Arnold] Heritage Coat" so that the focus would remain on near-term uniform needs. While the evaluation results of the heritage coat would be made available to the Air Force's leaders should they decide to implement the uniform change, the uniform overhaul is currently on hold indefinitely.

==== Combat uniforms ====
U.S. Air Force combat uniforms have continuously evolved since the Air Force became an independent service in 1947. Until the late 2000s, USAF combat uniforms were the same as those of the U.S. Army, with the exception of unique USAF insignia. The fatigue uniform differed from its Army counterpart with white lettering on an ultramarine blue background for "U.S. AIR FORCE" and last name tapes above the pockets, white-collar rank insignia on a blue background for officers (with the exception of yellow thread replicating gold for rank insignia for 2nd Lieutenants and Majors) and blue and white sleeve rank insignia for enlisted, a full color patch of the major command worn on the right pocket, and a blue belt.

As the Army transitioned to black and brown subdued insignia on a green background on their combat uniforms in the late 1960s and 1970s, the Air Force effected a similar transition to subdued insignia in the 1980s, transitioning to blue or brown on a green background and with subdued major command patches also employing subdued reds and black.

In the 1980s and 1990s, as the Army increasingly transitioned to the Battle Dress Uniform (BDU) in woodland camouflage, the Air Force also followed suit, retaining the USAF versions of the subdued cloth insignia of the previous utility uniform. As the Army began using the first version of the Desert Camouflage Uniform (DCU) at the time of the first Gulf War in 1990, so did the Air Force, followed by its replacement the second iteration of the DCU worn by all branches of the U.S. Armed Forces from the mid-1990s through 2011. In the case of the Air Force, subdued brown insignia on a tan background was worn on the DCU, with the exception of black officer rank insignia for 1st Lieutenants and Lieutenant Colonels.

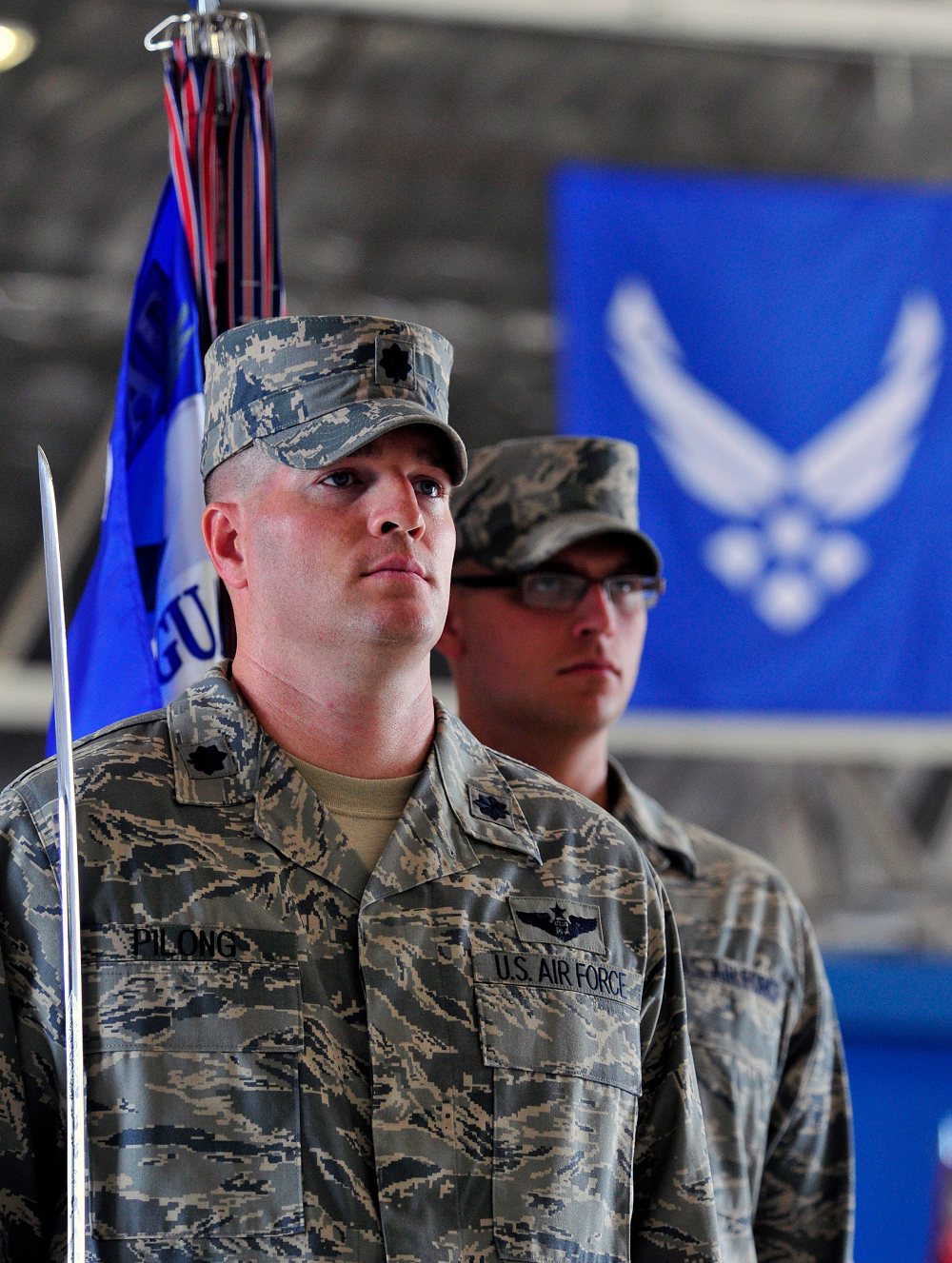
U.S. Air Force airmen in the Airman Battle Uniform

The Airman Battle Uniform (ABU) replaced the BDU as a general fatigue uniform, the latter having been discontinued after 31 October 2011. The ABU was issued to members deploying as part of Air Expeditionary Force 7 and Air Expeditionary Force 8 in spring 2007. In October 2007, ABUs were issued to enlisted basic trainees at the Basic Military Training School (BMTS) at Lackland AFB, Texas, and became available for purchase at AAFES outlets by the rest of the Air Force in June 2008.

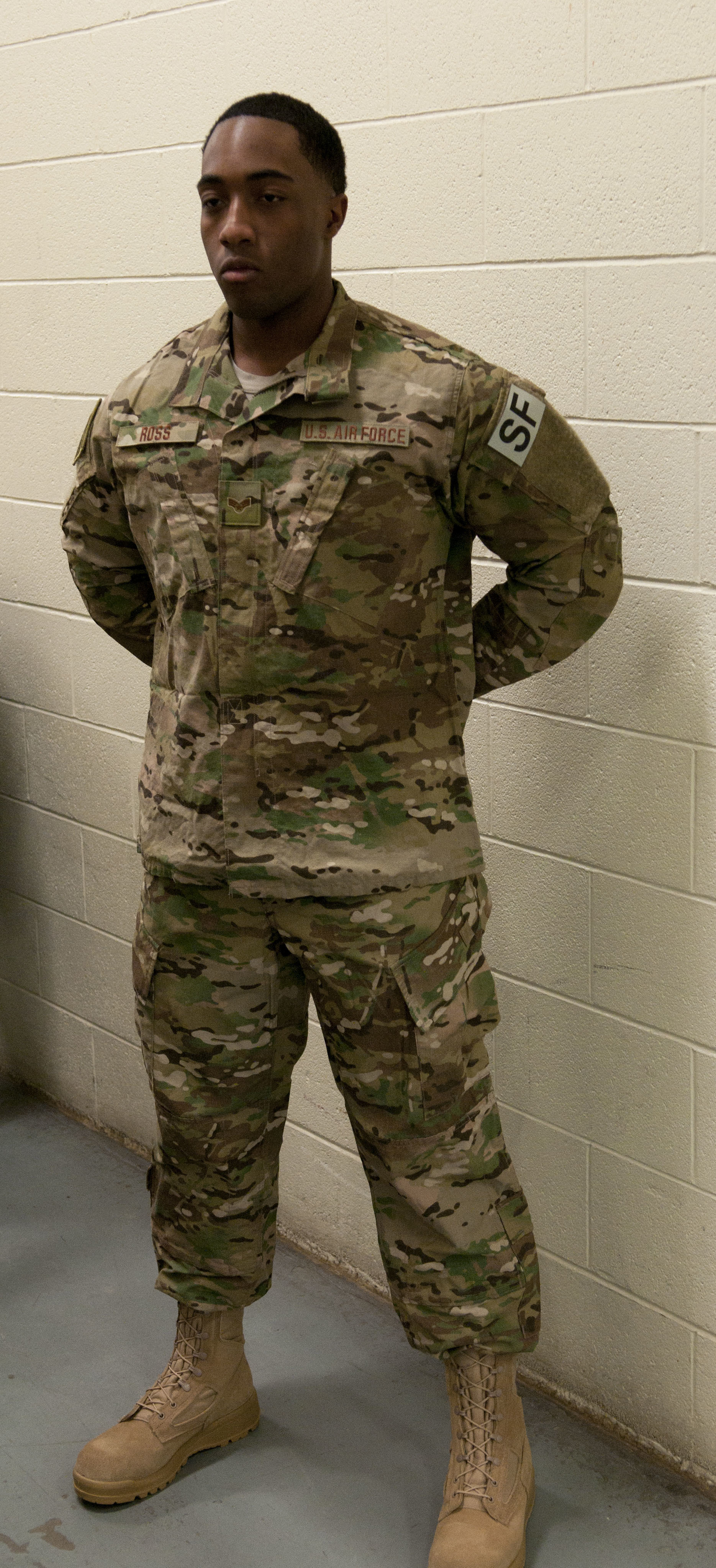
USAF airman wearing the Army Combat Uniform in the MultiCam camouflage pattern during the mid-2010s

Due to its lack of flame resistance, the ABU is no longer considered an appropriate uniform for combat duty. Beginning in August 2010, the Air Force began to issue Operation Enduring Freedom Camouflage Pattern uniforms for Air Force personnel deploying in support of that operation. These were succeeded by the Air Force-wide adoption in 2018 of the Operational Camouflage Pattern (OCP) uniform also used by the Army.

== Current uniforms ==
=== Standard uniforms ===
==== Service dress ====
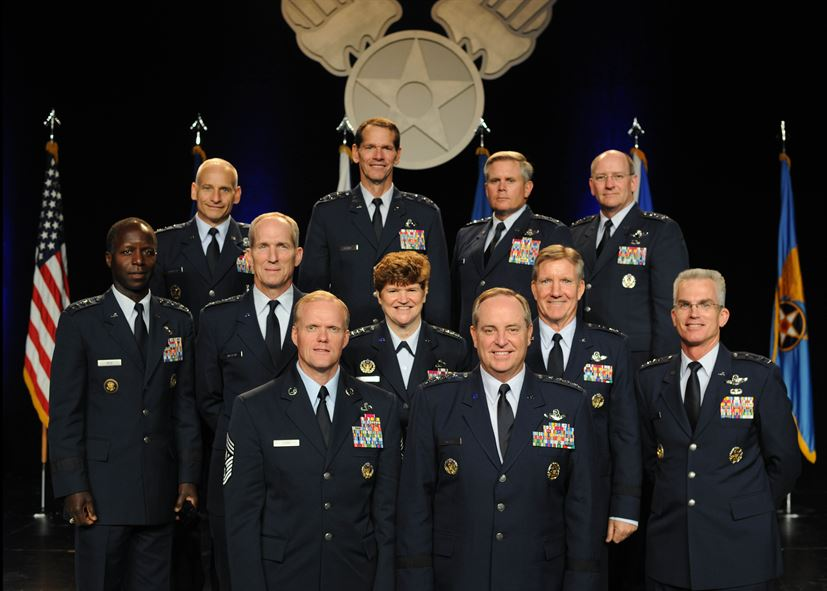
Current Service Dress uniforms worn by senior general officers and the Chief Master Sergeant of the Air Force

The current U.S. Air Force Service Dress Uniform, which was initially adopted in 1994 and made mandatory on 1 October 1999, consists of a three-button coat with silver-colored buttons featuring a design known as "Hap Arnold wings" (which replaced the previous design that utilized the Department of the Air Force crest), matching trousers (women may choose to wear a matching skirt), and either a peaked service cap or flight cap, all in Shade 1620, also known as "Air Force Blue". This is worn with a light blue (Shade 1550) shirt (for men) or blouse (for women) and a necktie (for men) or neck tab (for women) in shade 1620. Silver mirror-finish "U.S." pins are worn on the lapels. Enlisted "U.S." lapel pins have circles around them, while officers' pins do not. Officers' coats also have epaulets (shoulder straps), which are not present on enlisted members' coats.

Enlisted personnel wear cloth rank insignia on both sleeves of the jacket and shirt, while officers wear metal rank insignia pinned onto the shoulder straps of the coat, and Air Force Blue slide-on loops ("soft rank" shoulder insignia) on the straps of the shirt. Officers also wear a band of dark blue cloth sleeve braid loops 3 inches from the cuffs of the sleeves of the coat. General officers wear a 1½ inch wide braid while officers in the rank of colonel and below wear a ½ inch wide braid.

While the full "Class A" configuration of the service dress uniform includes the coat, for daily duty, particularly in warm weather climates, USAF personnel will typically wear the light blue shirt or blouse as an outer garment, with or without a tie or neck tab, with applicable rank insignia, speciality badges and a blue plastic name tag (ribbons are optional). A variety of alternate outer garments are also authorized for this uniform combination such as blue pullover sweater, blue cardigan sweater, lightweight blue jacket, or brown leather A-2 flight jacket (flight jacket wear is limited to aeronautically rated officers, enlisted aircrew, and officer and enlisted missile operations personnel only).

==== Mess dress ====
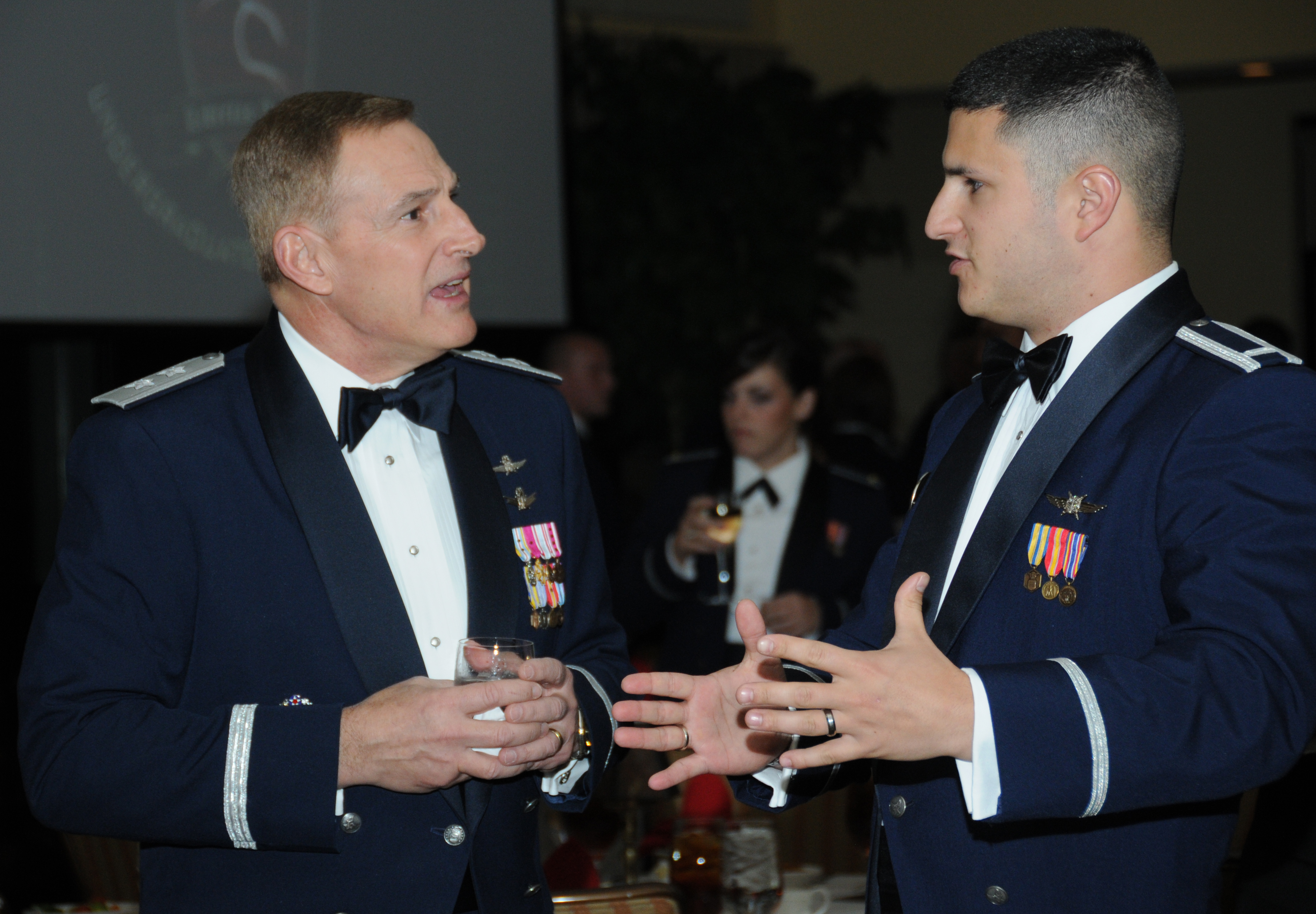
Mess dress for general officers (left) and officers (right)

The Mess dress uniform is worn to formal or semi-formal occasions such as dinings-in and dinings-out, the annual Air Force Ball, weddings and other formal functions where civilian "black tie" would be prescribed. The current mess dress uniform in use since the early/mid-1980s consists of a dark blue mess jacket and mess dress trousers for men and a similar color evening-length skirt for women; as of August 2020, women have the option to wear mess dress trousers. The jacket features ornate silver buttons, and is worn with the service member's awarded medals in miniature size, wings in miniature size, or other specialty insignia over the left breast, command insignia over the right breast for colonels and below (if applicable), satin air force blue bow-tie for men or tab for women, and a satin air force blue cummerbund. Cufflinks can be either shined or flat round silver or have the air force star and wing emblem. Dark blue suspenders may also be worn, but remain hidden while the jacket is on. Commissioned officers, USAFA and AFROTC cadets, and OTS officer trainees wear hard shoulder boards similar to those worn by commissioned officers of the U.S. Navy. Commissioned officer shoulder boards for colonels and below feature an officer's rank insignia in raised metallic thread, bordered by two silver vertical metallic stripes similar to sleeve braid. General officers wear shoulder boards covered nearly the entire length and width in a silver metallic braid, with silver stars in a raised metallic thread in number appropriate to their rank. Enlisted personnel typically wear the same large rank insignia that they would wear on their service dress coats. Officers also wear a single silver metallic sleeve braid on the lower sleeves of the Mess Dress coat, with sleeve braid coming in two widths, in a 1/2 inch width for colonel and below, and in a 3/4 inch width for Brigadier General and above. Enlisted personnel normally wear no sleeve braid. No hat or nametag is worn with the Air Force Mess Dress Uniform.

Until the early 1980s, this uniform differed from the current version, previously consisting of separate mess jackets, a white mess jacket worn in spring and summer and a black mess jacket worn in fall and winter, combined with black trousers and ties for men and an options of a black cocktail length or black evening-length skirt for women. Black cummerbunds for men and women and white and black service hats for men were also prescribed, although wear of these hats was often optional.

==== Combat uniforms ====
On 14 May 2018, the U.S. Air Force announced that all personnel will transition to the Army Combat Uniform in Operational Camouflage Pattern (OCP), which the Air Force refers to by the latter term. All personnel were allowed to wear OCPs beginning on 1 October 2018, and the wear out date for the ABU was 1 April 2021.

Pilots, navigators/combat systems officers, air crews, remotely piloted aircraft (RPA) crews, and missile crews continue to wear olive green or desert tan one-piece flight suits, or the two-piece OCP pattern flight suit. All three are made of Nomex for fire protection when performing or in direct support of flying or missile duties, or when otherwise prescribed. The one piece flight suits are required for any aircrew position in which ejection seats are used. Aircrew not in an ejection seat and ground based crews, like RPA and missile crews, may wear either the two or one piece flight suits.

The black leather boots and sage or green suede boots previously worn were discontinued with the phase out of the BDU and ABU respectively. All personnel now wear the coyote brown suede boots with all combat uniforms authorized.

==== Physical Training Gear ====
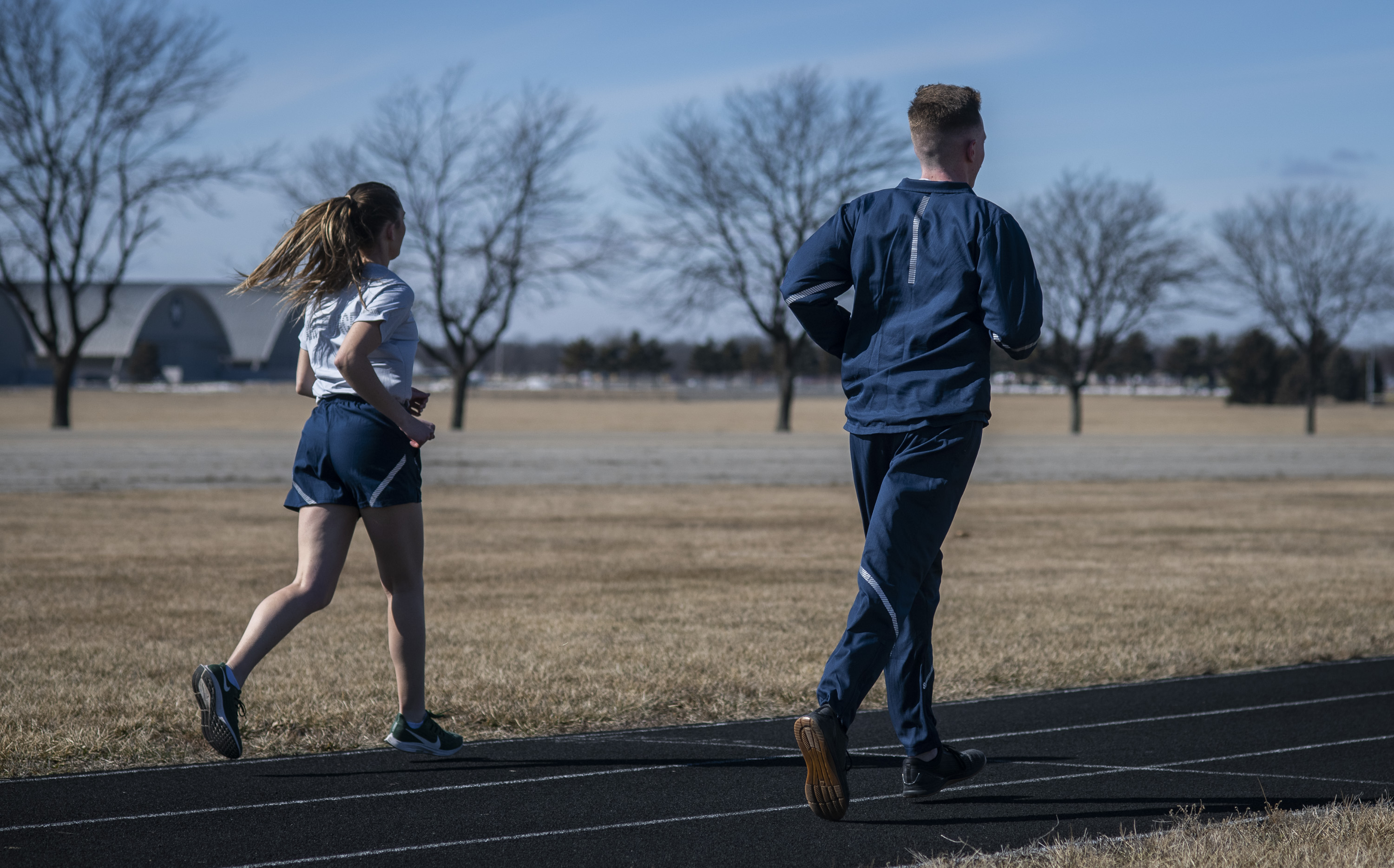
Air Force Uniform Office members wearing the USAF PTG

The Air Force Physical Training Gear (PTG), first released on 1 October 2006 as Air Force Physical Training Uniform (AFPTU), consists of shorts, short-sleeve and long-sleeve T-shirts, jackets, and pants. The shorts are AF blue with a silver reflective Air Force logo on the wearer's front left and reflective stripes on the sides. The T-shirts are light grey with moisture-wicking fabric with a reflective Air Force logo on the upper left portion of the chest and the words "AIR FORCE" across the back. The jacket is blue with white piping and a reflective vertical line along the back. The pants are blue with silver reflective stripes on the lower legs. At one point, the jacket and pants were redesigned with a lighter, quieter material that didn't make noise with movement.

=== Distinctive uniforms ===
U.S. Air Force uniform regulations authorize personnel assigned to public duties and some other units to wear "distinctive uniforms," a similar concept to the "special ceremonial units" identified in U.S. Army uniform regulations.

==== Band uniforms ====
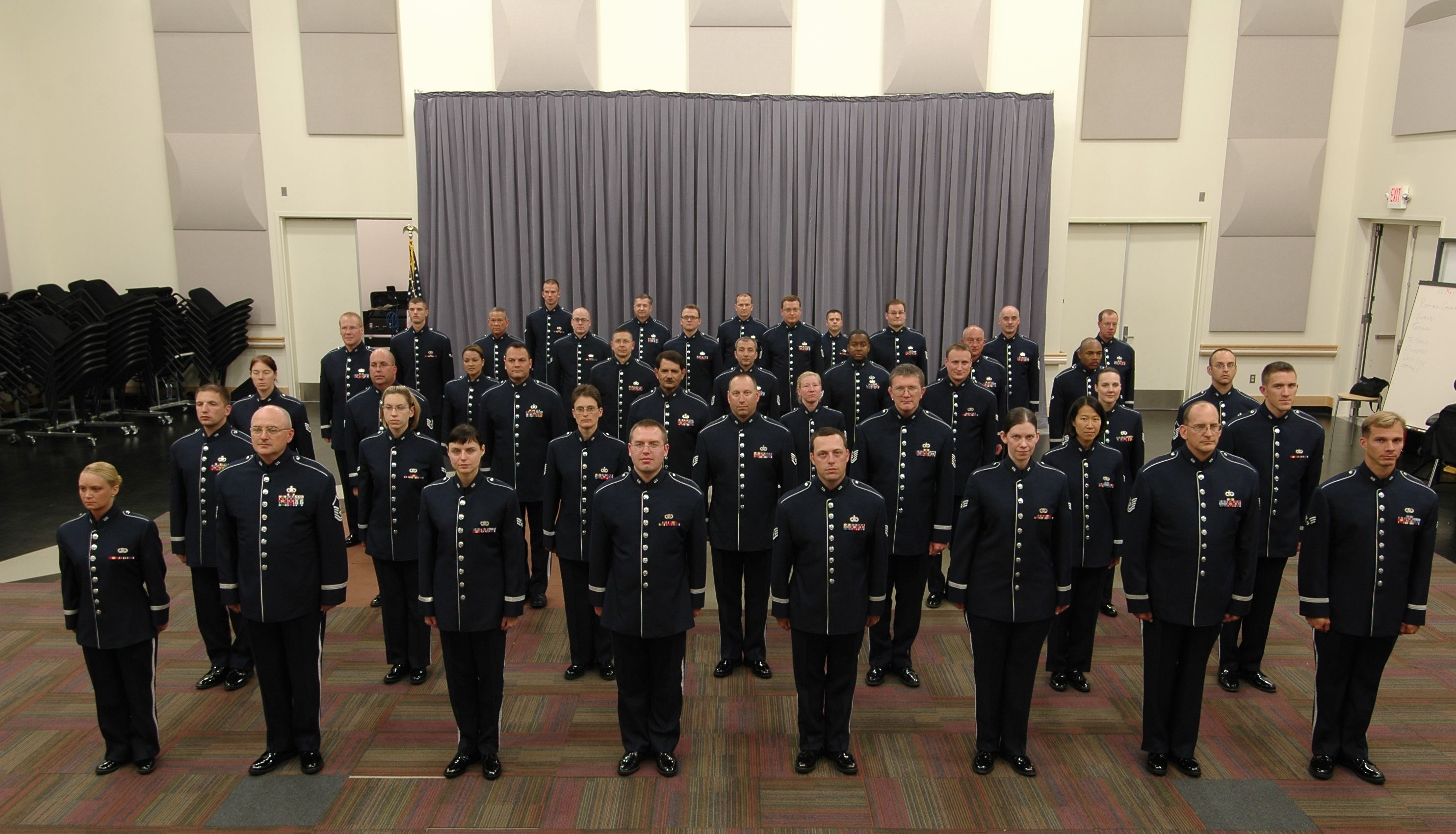
Members of the US Air Force Band of the West model the ceremonial uniform

Personnel assigned to the United States Air Force Band, the United States Air Force Academy Band, and regional bands of the U.S. Air Force wear the ceremonial band tunic: a blue coat with a standing collar, silver piping on the shoulder straps and front opening, and silver braid on the sleeve cuffs, worn with trousers with silver braid on the outer leg. As with other United States military bands, drum-majors may replace the blue peaked hat with a bearskin helmet, and add a baldric with campaign ribbons.

==== Command uniforms ====
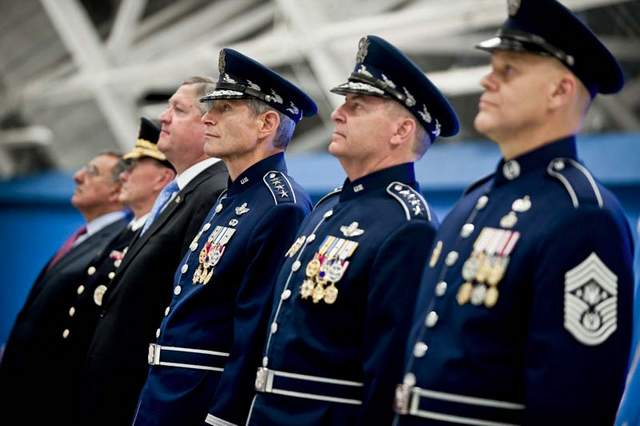
Gen. Norton Schwartz, Gen. Mark Welsh III and Chief Master Sergeant of the Air Force James A. Roy wearing command ceremonial uniforms in 2012

The Air Force Chief of Staff and the Chief Master Sergeant of the Air Force are authorized to wear a special ceremonial uniform consisting of a stand-collar coat and braided trousers similar to the ceremonial band uniform, with the addition of a silver braid trimmed belt. Each uniform costs $700 with the wearer required to personally pay for purchase. This uniform was worn on 10 August 2012 at the ceremony in which Gen. Mark Welsh III succeeded Gen. Norton Schwartz as the 20th Air Force Chief of Staff, but was not used for the subsequent ceremonies of Gen. David L. Goldfein and General Charles Q. Brown.

==== Equestrian uniform ====
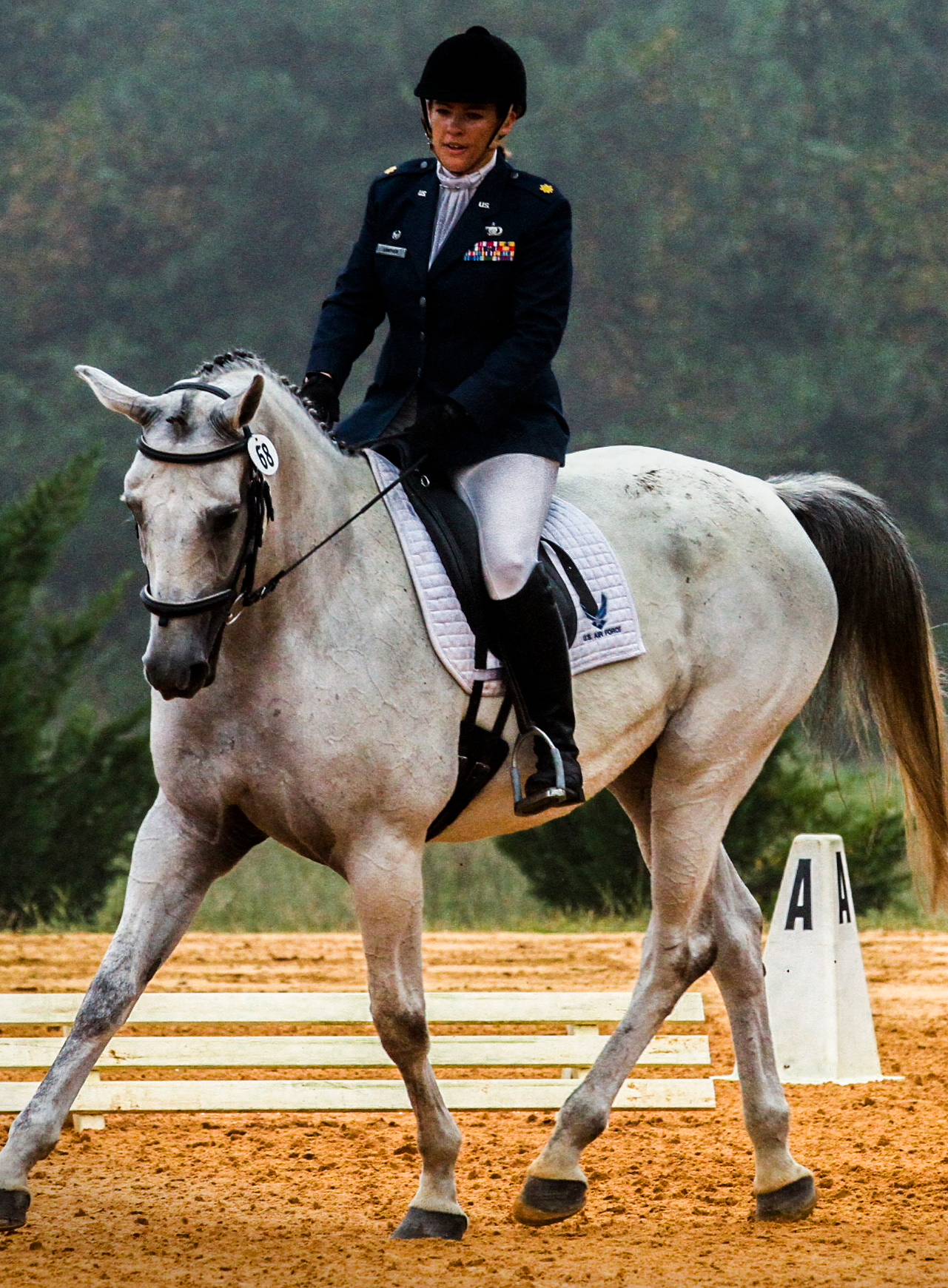
Maj. Laurie Lanpher in Air Force equestrian uniform

The U.S. Air Force "Equestrian Competition Service Dress Configuration" is a special uniform authorized for wear during formal dressage events sponsored by the United States Equestrian Federation. The equestrian uniform is similar to service dress, but features white riding breeches in lieu of blue trousers. Black gloves, a black helmet, and black riding boots with silver spurs are also worn.

==== Honor guards ====
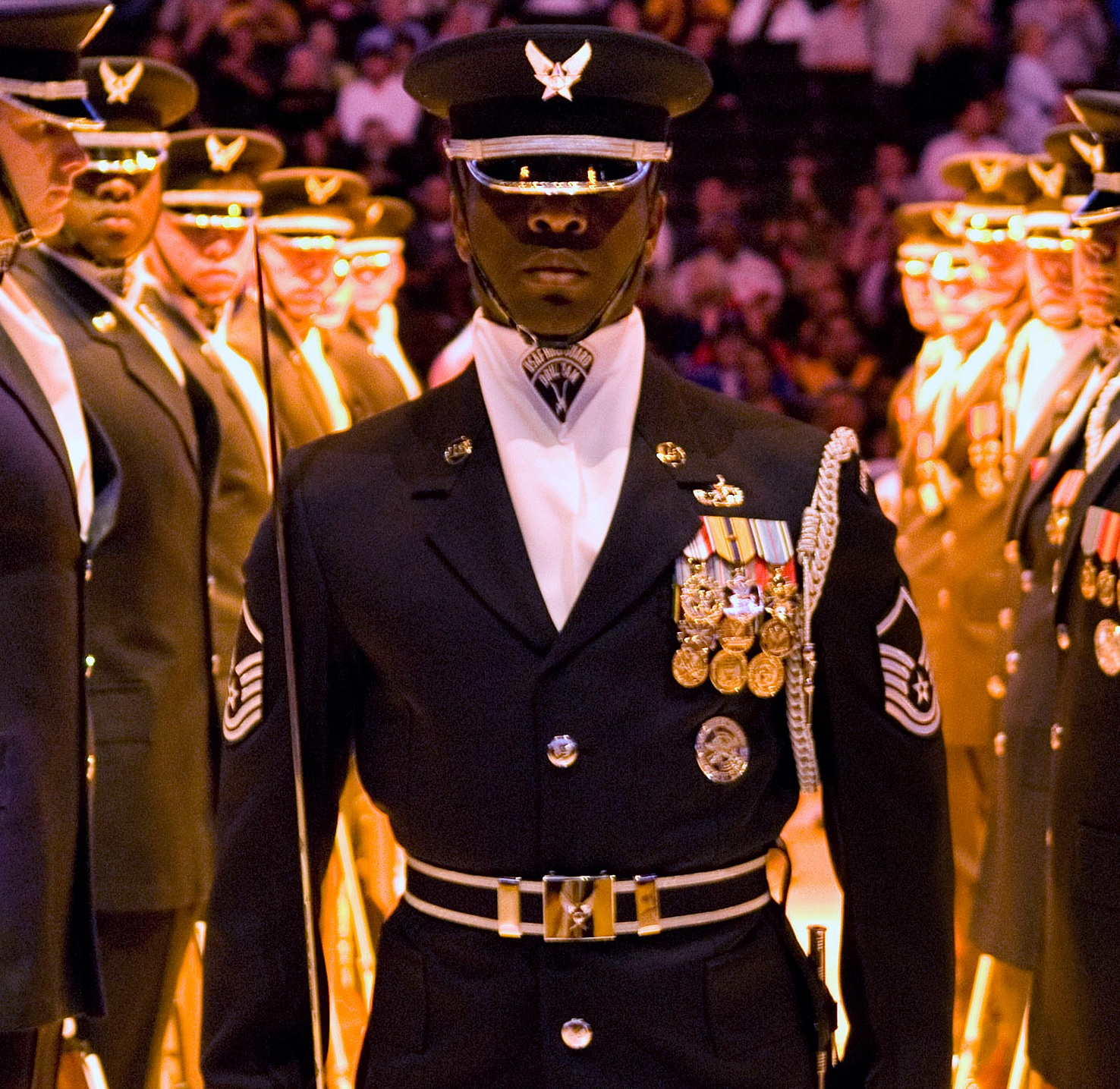
U.S. Air Force SNCO in honor guard uniform with ascot

The U.S. Air Force Drill Team, a special demonstration performance unit, as well as base honor guards, and the USAF marching unit, wear the distinctive honor guard uniform. Modeled on the service uniform, the honor guard uniform adds a silver-braided belt, silver aiguillette, white cotton gloves, and white ascot. Large medals are worn in lieu of ribbons. "Ceremonial headgear" consists of a blue peaked hat with polished black visor.

==== Informal uniform ====
Bandsmen, recruiters, chaplains, and fitness center staff are permitted to wear the Air Force "informal uniform" while on duty. This civilian business casual–style dress consists of an Air Force blue polo shirt with embroidered emblem, khaki trousers, and solid black low quarter or athletic shoes.

=== Cadet uniforms ===
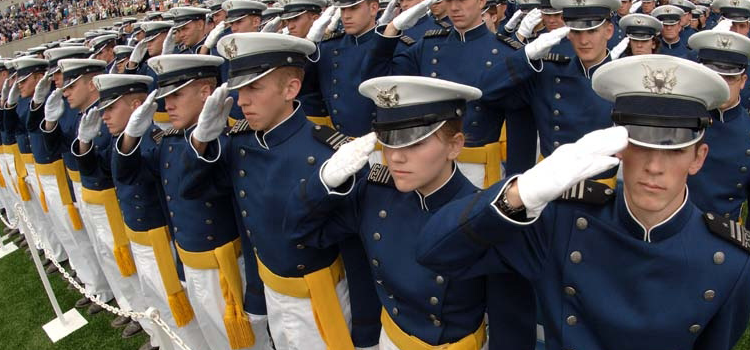
U.S. Air Force Academy cadets wearing parade dress uniforms

Prospective commissioned officers in a pre-commissioning status, for example, U.S. Air Force Academy cadets wear slide-on cadet or officer trainee "soft rank" insignia on their shirts and hard "shoulder boards" (similar to commissioned officer mess dress shoulder board insignia) on their service dress coats, again with cadet or officer trainee rank insignia. College and university AFROTC cadets and OTS officer trainees will also wear the soft ranks on their shirts, but will also wear on the service coat. The hard ranks are only worn on the Mess Dress uniform for ROTC or OTS cadets. The typical headgear for all is a flight cap with medium density silver metallic thread piping and the prop & wings insignia for cadets who successfully complete recognition (USAFA), Field Training (ROTC), or the first half of OTS in place of the traditional officer insignia.

High school Air Force Junior Reserve Officers' Training Corps (AFJROTC) cadets wear the Air Force enlisted service dress uniform with an Air Force Junior ROTC patch and unit patch sewn onto the sleeves of the coat and shirt. Cadet officers and cadet enlisted both wear pin-on metal ranks on the lapels of their coats. Cadet officers wear slide-on soft ranks on the epaulets of their shirts while cadet enlisted wear pin-on metal ranks on the collar of their shirts. All Junior ROTC cadets wear the same flight caps as Air Force enlisted personnel with no thread piping, and cadet officers just wear an officer version of the AFJROTC insignia on their flight caps to distinguish themselves from cadet enlisted.

Cadets at the United States Air Force Academy are also authorized a unique, institutionally-authorized parade dress uniform consisting of blue-grey shell jackets worn with a white belt (gold or platinum waist sash for seniors), white trousers, and white peaked hats. The cadet parade uniform was designed by Hollywood film director Cecil B. DeMille, who received the Secretary of Defense Exceptional Civilian Service Award for his work on the academy's uniforms.

The cadet parade dress uniform was modified beginning with the graduation of the class of 2020. First class (senior) cadets commissioning into the Space Force wear a platinum sash instead of the gold sash during their graduations.

=== Special uniform situations ===
==== Campaign hats ====
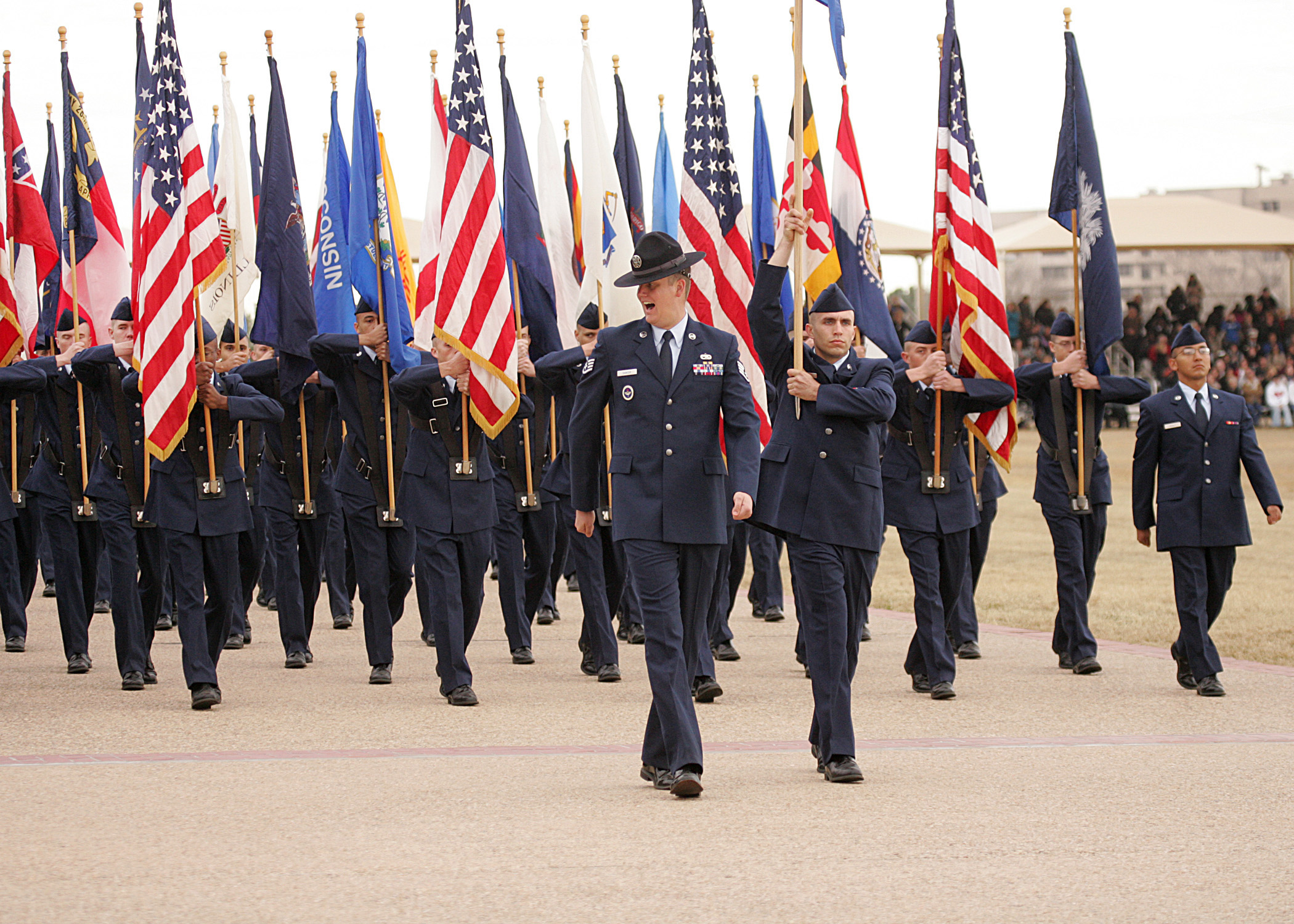
USAF Military Training Instructor wearing a campaign hat

As with the U.S. Army and U.S. Marine Corps, drill instructors in the U.S. Air Force—known as Military Training Instructors—are authorized to wear a campaign hat. The Air Force campaign hat is navy blue and features the Great Seal of the United States within a silver ring.

==== Highland dress ====
In 1950, US Air Force (USAF) General S. D. "Rosie" Grubbs began organizing an Air Force Pipe Band, as part of the USAF Drum and Bugle Corps. The United States Air Force Pipe Band was organized as an independent band in 1960 under Colonel George Howard. Standardized wear of Highland dress, including sporran and Mitchell Tartan kilt, in honor of General William "Billy" Mitchell, was authorized by General Curtis LeMay. The pipe band was disbanded in early 1970, but wear of the official Active Duty Mitchell tartan (also known as the Hunter, Galbraith, Russell, or Milwaukee County) has been used since by U.S. Air Force Heritage Band Celtic Ensembles.

In 1961 the US Air Force Reserve (USAFR) organized a pipe band, due in part to the popularity of the USAF Pipe Band. The modern U.S. Air Force Reserve tartan was authorized and approved in 2001; however, the previously used "Lady Jane" tartan was adopted from the Strathmore Woollen Company in 1987. The Band of the Air Force Reserve Pipe Band, wears highland dress, including kilt and sporran. The band of the United States Air Force Reserve had one of the last U.S. military service pipe bands and closed down in 2013 due to sequestration. One piper is assigned to the United States Air Force Band in DC and a few other pipers still perform at official ceremonies across the Air Force.

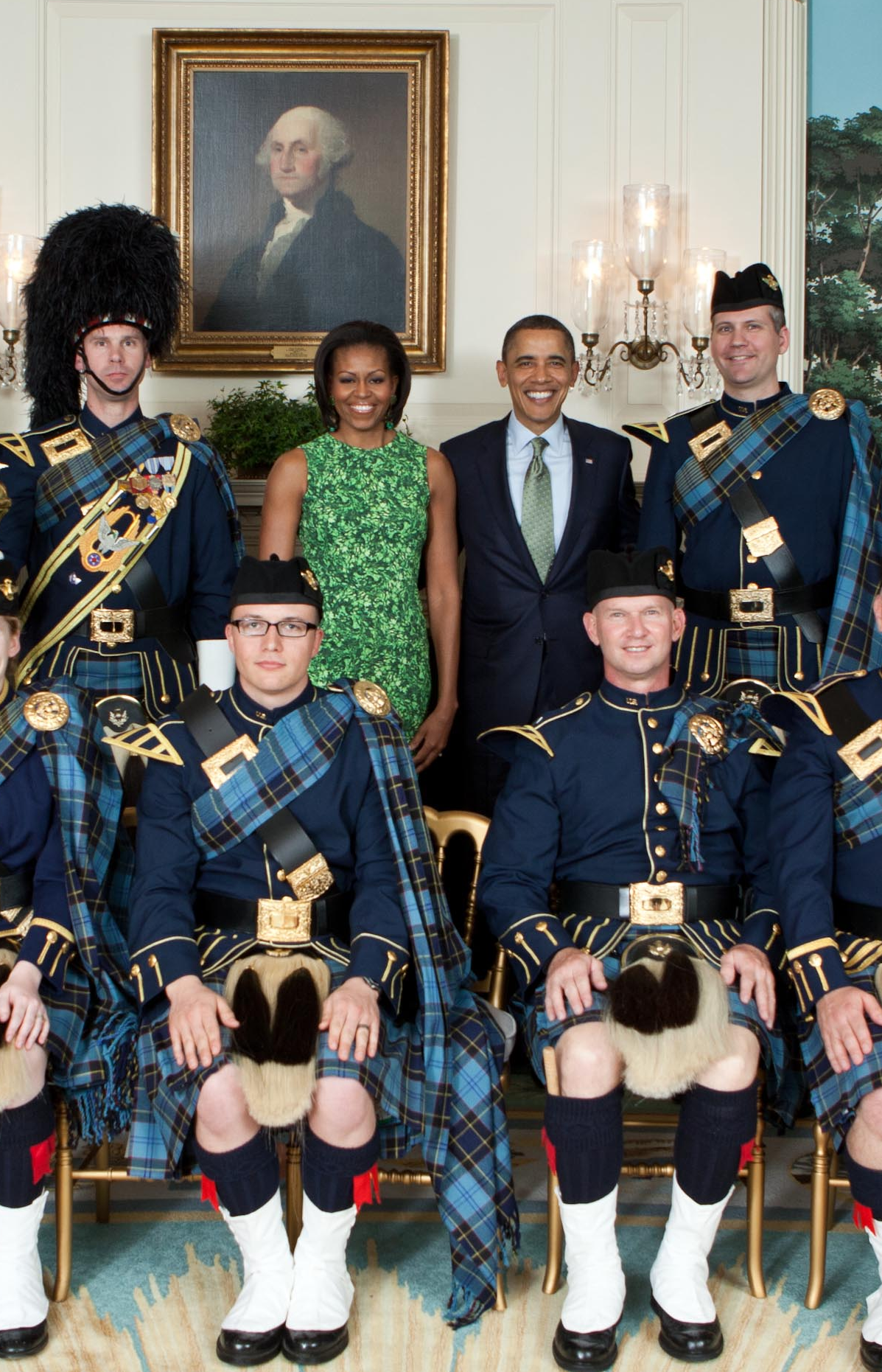
US Air Force Reserve Pipe Band in highland dress (reservist "2001" tartan) with President Barack Obama in the White House Diplomatic Reception Room

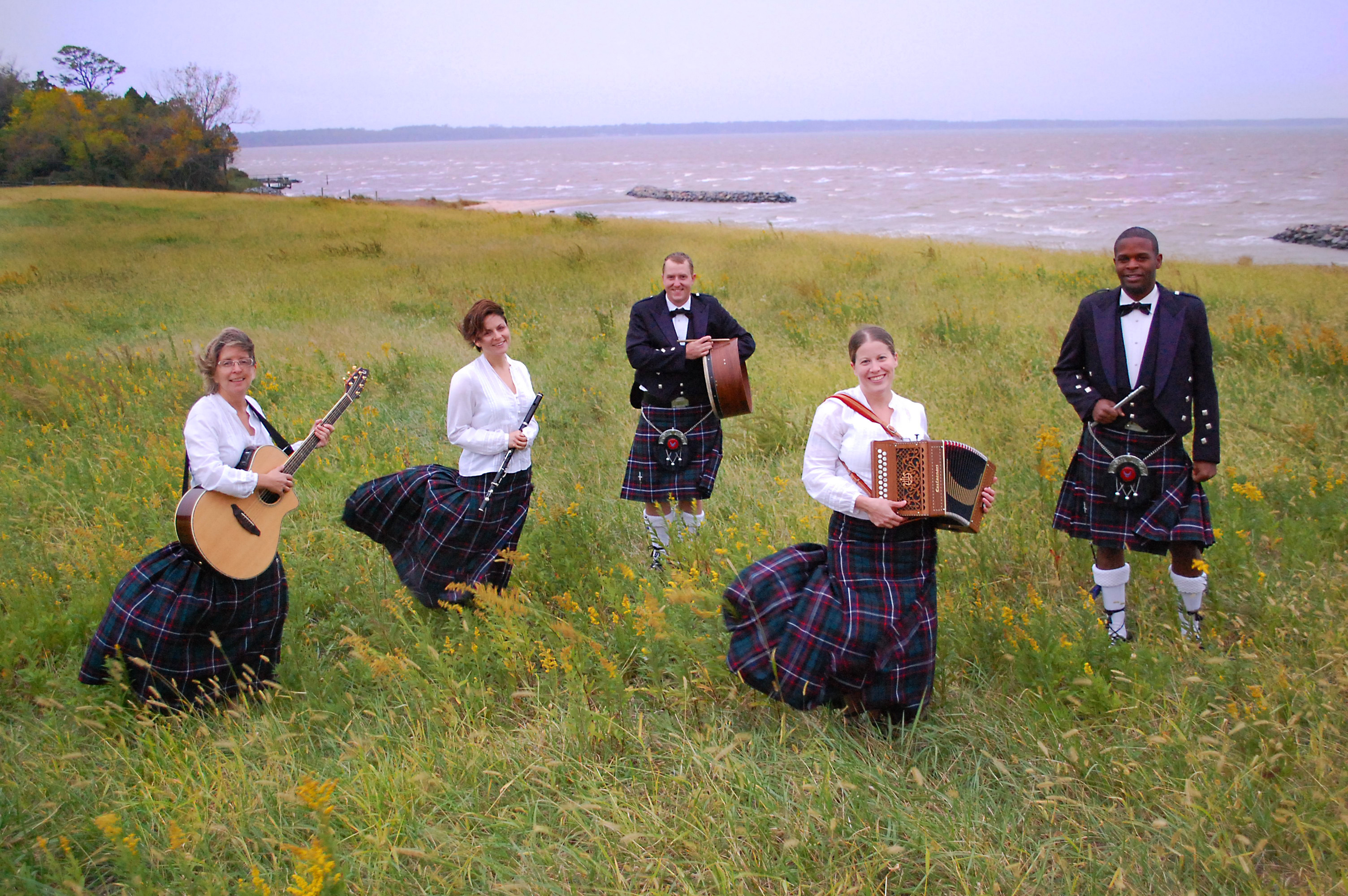
Official US Air Force Band photo for "Celtic Aire" Ensemble (active duty "Mitchell" tartan)

==== Hawaiian Royal Guard ====
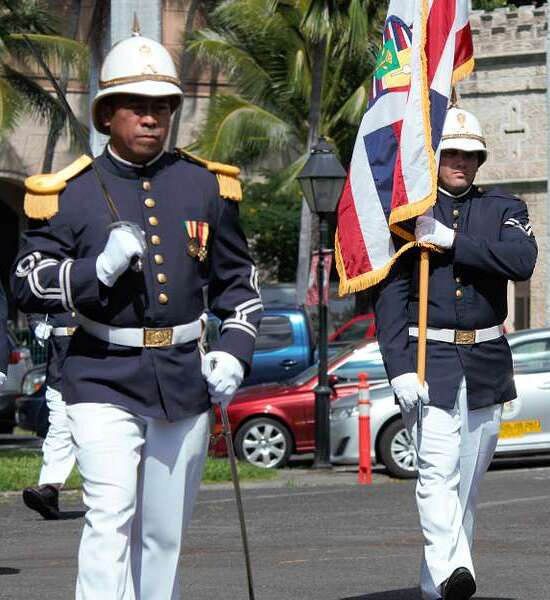
An officer and an enlisted airman of the Hawaiian Royal Guard

During the late 19th century, the Hawaiian Queen's Guard was responsible for protecting Royal Family of the Kingdom of Hawaii. It was disbanded in 1893 following the annexation of Hawaii by the United States, overthowing Queen Lili'uokalani and installing Sanford Dole as governor of the new territory.

Following Hawaii's admission as a U.S. state, the Hawaii Air National Guard created a ceremonial Royal Guard unit in 1963 to honor and inspire its Native Hawaiian members, modeled after King David Kalākaua’s personal guard.

The uniform of the Royal Guard is based on the 1885 dark blue service dress tunic and a white spiked cork pith helmet introduced for the funeral procession for Queen Emma.

They are currently one of the only units in the U.S. military authorized to wear a pith helmet.

== See also ==
- List of camouflage patterns § North America N-Z
- Uniforms of the United States Armed Forces
- United States Army Air Forces
