= Imogene + Willie =

American clothing brand

- Type: Private
- Industry: Fashion, Denim, Casual clothing
- Founded: 2009
- Founders: Matt Eddmenson, Carrie Eddmenson
- Headquarters: Nashville, Tennessee, United States
- Area served: United States
- Products: Jeans, casual clothing
- Website: imogeneandwillie.com

Imogene + Willie is a brand of jeans and casual clothing founded by Matt and Carrie Eddmenson in 2009 in Nashville, Tennessee. The brand is known for blending classic American workwear aesthetics with modern fashion sensibilities.

Imogene + Willie is headquartered in Nashville, Tennessee, and has a retail space in Austin, Texas. Much of their goods are produced at their Los Angeles sewing room and through collaborations with domestic mills and small businesses.

The brand name combinez the names of Carrie Eddmenson's grandparents: Imogene was her grandmother and Willie was her grandfather.

== History ==
The company was established in 2009 by Matt and Carrie Eddmenson, two individuals with a passion for high-quality denim and a shared vision of reviving traditional craftsmanship in the fashion industry. After the closure of Carrie’s family denim facility, Sights Denim Systems, the dream for Imogene + Willie was born.

Their initial goal was to sell 250 pairs of their inaugural fits: Imogene (for women) and Willie (for men), but their initial release quickly surpassed that number.

In 2010, the brand opened its first store in Nashville, Tennessee in a former gas station. The space was not only a retail location but also served as a workshop, where jeans were designed, produced, and customized on-site.

Married couple Robert Lamey and Paige Heid invested $1.5 million in July 2013 for a 46.5% stake in the company. In 2016, investors in Imogene + Willie accused the company's founders of fraud and mismanagement of company money to fund their own lavish lifestyle. In court documents former Chief Financial Officer Celia Highes stated that the Eddmensons’ “irresponsible spending” included personal pay raises, spa visits, a $10,000 motorcycle and shopping trips at Barneys New York and J. Crew. K.P. McNeill took majority ownership of the business in 2018, becoming CEO; the Eddmensons retained a minority stake. In 2025 the company purchased the building housing its flagship store in 12South for $3.2 million.

In 2013, imogene + willie opened a shop in Portland, Oregon which later closed. In 2022 a store opened in Austin, Texas on South Congress.

== Manufacturing ==
Imogene + Willie products are all Made in USA. While many of their products are patterned, cut, and sewn in their Los Angeles based sewing room, they also collaborate with many other small business and mills to produce socks, jackets, and other similar garments.

Imogene + Willie has established partnerships with suppliers such as Mount Vernon Mills in Georgia, which weaves denim for the brand using historic Draper X3 shuttle looms. The company sources some of its denim from cotton grown regeneratively at Martin Farms in Alabama, spun at Hill Spinning in North Carolina, dyed with natural indigo produced by Stony Creek Colors in Tennessee, and woven and finished at Mount Vernon Mills.

The brand has collaborated Alpha Industries on military-inspired workwear.

In 2026 Wrangler and Imogene + Willie collaborated on jeans made with deadstock selvedge denim from Cone Denim’s shuttered White Oak mill in Greensboro, North Carolina.
