= 12South =

12South is a Nashville neighborhood centered along a half-mile stretch of 12th Avenue South. The neighborhood includes a trendy commercial drag and tree-lined, historic residential streets notable for Craftsman bungalows. The retail establishments in the neighborhood include: imogene + willie in a converted vintage gas station; White's Mercantile, a modern-day general store owned by a daughter of Hank Williams Jr.; and Draper James, a contemporary women's fashion brand founded by Reese Witherspoon.
