= Valley Apparel L.L.C. =

Valley Apparel, L.L.C.
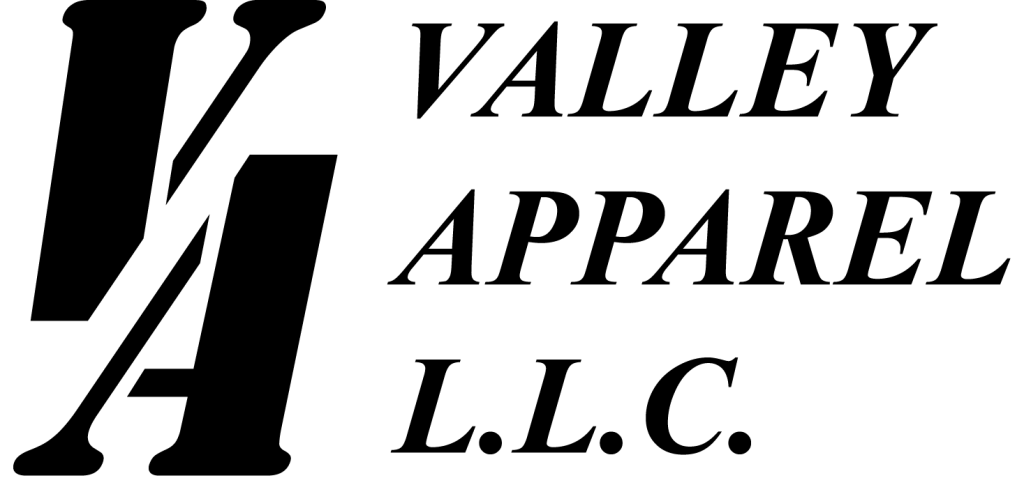
- Type: Private
- Industry: Clothing
- Founded: Knoxville, Tennessee 1959
- Headquarters: Knoxville, Tennessee, United States
- Key people: John Niethammer, Owner / President; Jeffrey D. Niethammer, Owner / Executive Vice President
- Website: www.valleyapparel.net

Valley Apparel L.L.C. is a United States brand of clothing consisting of Flight jackets and military outerwear manufactured in Knoxville, Tennessee for the United States Armed Forces. Founded in 1959 and independent since 2000, Valley specializes in military style apparel for both the consumer market and military customers in the United States Department of Defense (DoD).

== History ==
=== Origins ===
In January, 1948 Robert Lane formed Superior Togs Corporation in New York City to manufacture flight jackets for the Department of Defense. In 1951 he moved his expanding business to a factory to Elizabeth, New Jersey. The following year the Government suspended operations for problems related to contract obligations. In response Lane reformed his company under a different name, Rolen Sportswear, and resumed production of flight jackets for the DoD.

By 1957 Lane sought to expand. This was achieved by creating a new company, Dobbs Industries, under 90% ownership of Lane's accountant, Samuel Gelber. Lane decided to locate Dobbs in Knoxville, Tennessee where they were able to lease factory space from Levi Strauss & Co. and acquire labor and supplies from the Wynn Industries Group.

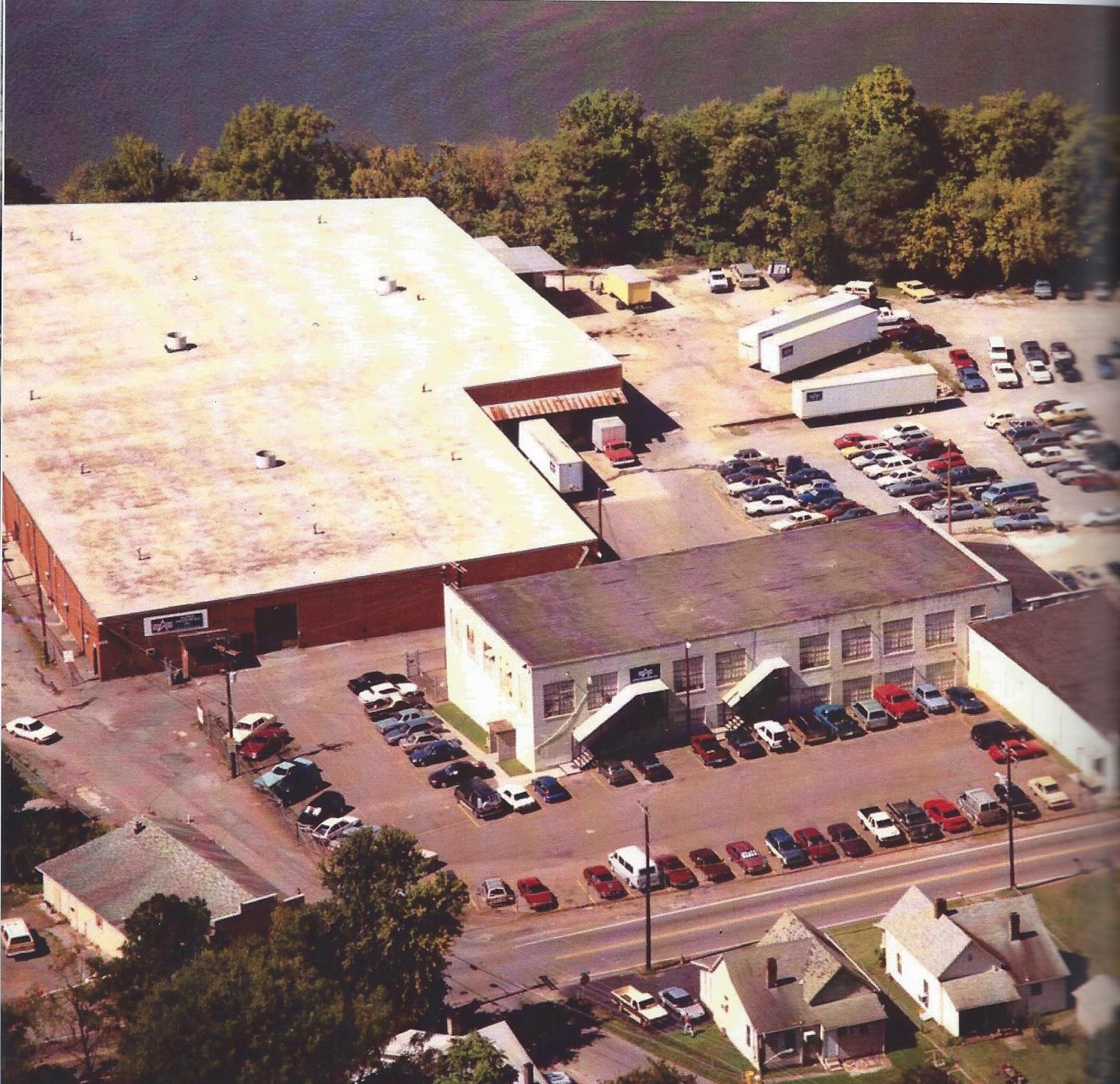
The Blount Avenue factory complex c.1984. Formerly part of Alpha Industries, the building is now home to Valley Apparel L.L.C.

Dobbs functioned as a subcontractor of Rolen Sportswear until 1959 when Robert Lane was caught bribing Government officials for contacts. Both Rolen Sportswear and Dobbs Industries were suspended from DoD contracts, their only source of revenue. In response Gelber approached the Wynn Industries Group and established his own company to continue flight jacket contracts for the U.S. military.

=== Creation of Valley Apparel ===
In 1961 John Niethammer was hired by one of the Wynn Group's subsidiaries to develop quality controls plans to meet Government standards. In 1982 he became an operating officer of the company. Following a decision in 2000 to separate the commercial and government sides of the business John purchased the main Knoxville manufacturing plants from Alpha Industries and began Valley Apparel L.L.C., aimed specifically at fulfilling DoD contracts.

In 2008, a second plant was opened in Clinton with 60 employees. In 2016, it expanded by another 40 workers following a three-year contract worth $17.1 million to manufacture Gen III Layer 6 pants.

== Today ==
Valley Apparel is today a supplier of outerwear to the U.S. military, especially of Gore-Tex fabrics. Since splitting from Alpha they have fulfilled a number of military contracts.

== Products ==
Valley Apparel produces namely:

- 36/P Flight jacket
- 45/P Flight jacket
- APECS Parka and Trousers
- USN Shipboard Jackets
- N-3B Parka

== Notes ==
- Cirker, Alan D. (2009). Alpha Industries Inc.: A Fifty Year History of an American Clothing Contractor. Chantilly, Virginia: Baker Hill Publishing. ISBN 978-0-615-29181-9.
- "Government Contracts". Inside Gov. United States: United States Government. 2002.
- "Government Contracts". Inside Gov. United States: United States Government. 2013.
- "Government Contracts". Government Spending. United States: United States Government. 2013. Archived from the original on July 23, 2015.
