= United States Air Force Band of the Golden West =

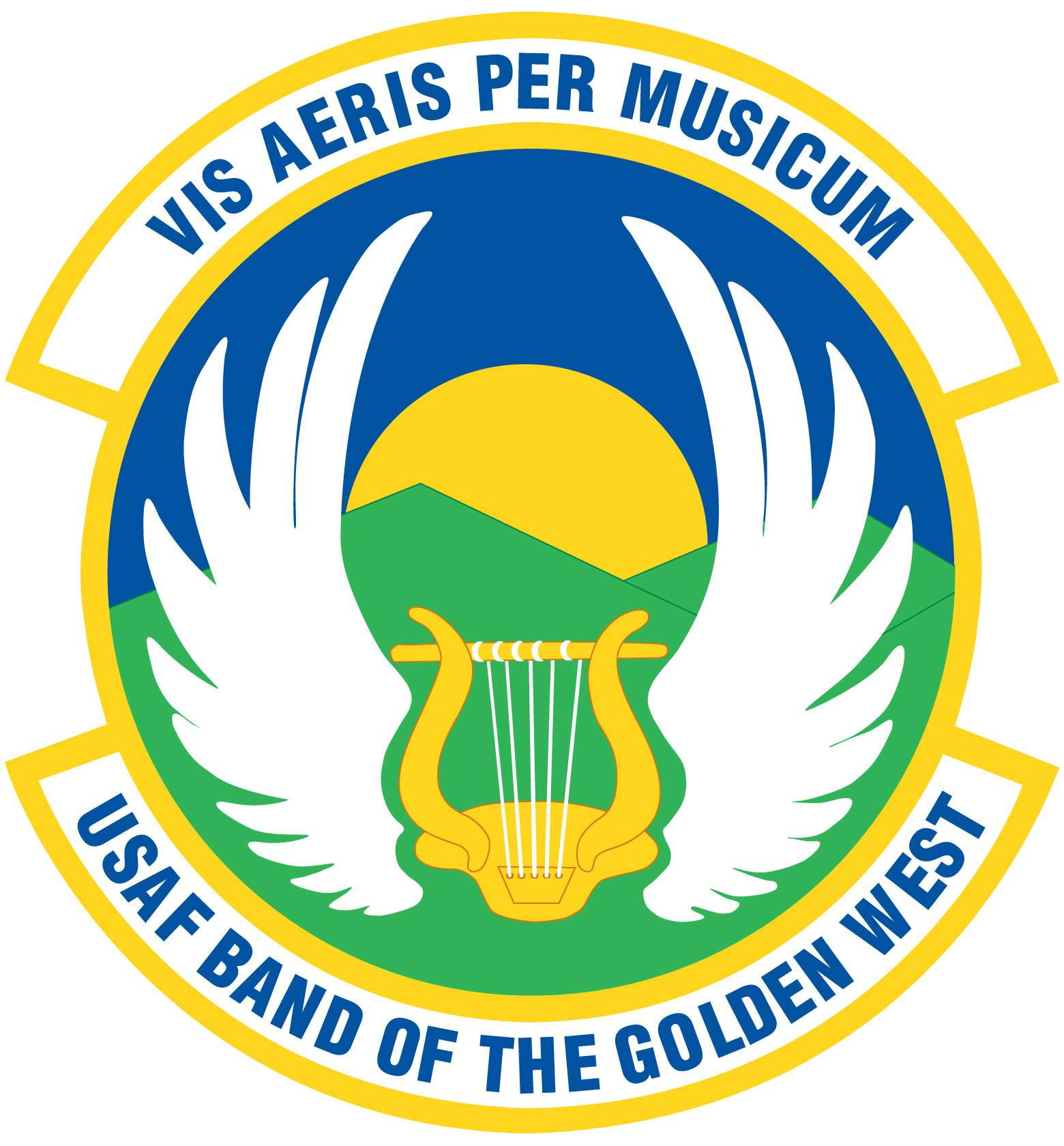
- Emblem
- Founded: 1997
- Branch: United States Air Force
- Type: Military band
- Size: 60
- Garrison/HQ: Travis Air Force Base, Fairfield, California

Commanders
- Current commander: Major Joseph S. Hansen

The United States Air Force Band of the Golden West is an American military band based at Travis Air Force Base, California. Its area of responsibility outside its home state includes Washington, Oregon, Arizona, and Nevada. It also supports 13 bases, 8 reserve wings, and 6 recruiting squadrons.

== History ==
The band's nickname/title of being the "Band of the Golden West" originated from the 574th and 575th Air Force Bands who were the first to be designated as such. Based in Parks Air Force Base, California, they held this honor until they were both inactivated in 1954. In 1994, the NORAD Band merged with the 15th Air Force Band and in 1997, was redesignated with its current name. In the three years between the merge and the band's renaming, the band was known as the "Air Mobility Command Band of the Golden West", effectively becoming the only active duty USAF band west of the Rocky Mountains.

=== Fifteenth Air Force Band ===
The 15th Air Force Band was constituted in Scott Field, Illinois on 1 October 1941 as a band in the United States Army Air Forces. It is the oldest ancestor of the current band. It was redesignated several times: first as the 23rd Army Air Forces Band, then finally as the 523rd Army Air Forces Band in 1944. The band was moved to Camp Shanks, New York in 1944 and was stationed there early 1945 when it sent to serve in Le Havre, France as well as RAF Warton, England. It would stay overseas for the duration of the year, coming home only in December of that year to be inactivated. in the mid-50s, the band was reactivated at March Air Force Base, California on 1 December 1952. On its golden jubilee in 1991, the band was redesignated as the Fifteenth Air Force Band of the Golden West, was moved to Travis Air Force Base to be merged with "America's Band in Blue" (504th Air Force Band).

=== NORAD Band ===
The NORAD Band was sponsored by the USAF part of the North American Air Defense Command (NORAD). It was a joint project between the United States Armed Forces and the Canadian Forces, as it was composed of members from the Army, Navy, and Air Force from the American side as well as musicians from the Royal Canadian Air Force representing the Canadian side. It was established in 1959 and operated as a touring band. During its existence, it had 90-members in its ranks. It often made performances on television and radio, making appearances at the Today Show, the Tonight Show, and the Dinah Shore Show. It took part in the filming of shows such as The Steve Allen Show and The Bell Telephone Hour. Ensembles it maintained ranged from the "Dixietones" to the NORAD "Velvetones". The band was dissolved in 1979, with the portion that were Americans being repurposed into the 504th Air Force Band of the Golden Gate. Notable Canadian members have included musician Bobby Herriot Rudolph Paul Gazarek future Director of the Naden Band of Maritime Forces Pacific and the then future director of the Central Band of the Canadian Armed Forces, Derek Stannard. In 1991, the band was re-designated as "America's Band in Blue".

== Ensembles ==
The band is currently composed of the following ensembles:

- Concert Band
- Marching Band
- The Commanders Jazz Ensemble
- Mobility (Rock Band)
- Galaxy (Rock Band)
- Travis Brass (Brass Quintet)
- Golden West Brass (Brass Quintet)
- Sierra Winds (Woodwind Quintet)
- Golden West Winds (Woodwind Quintet)

The Commanders Jazz Ensemble, is composed of 20 full-time professional musicians, and serves as the official jazz band for the Band of the Golden West. It performs many of the pieces written by jazz and big band personalities such as Duke Ellington, Woody Herman and Count Basie. It was declared a National Treasure by Congress in 1987.

== Events ==
The band has performed for gubernatorial inaugurations as well as military parades. Guest artists such as Marvin Stamm, Arturo Sandoval, Wayne Newton and Bob Hope have performed with the band. It has also performed at sporting events for teams such as the San Francisco Giants and the San Francisco 49ers. In a decade, the band led off three Tournament of Roses parades in Pasadena. In 2004, the band supported the interment ceremony of President Ronald Reagan in Simi Valley.

== Lineage ==
- Constituted as the Air Forces Band, Scott Field on 24 September 1941

Activated on 1 October 1941
Redesignated 23rd Army Air Forces Band c. August 1942
Redesignated 523rd Army Band on 27 December 1943
Redesignated 523rd Army Air Forces Band c. March 1944
Inactivated on 15 December 1945

- Redesignated 523rd Air Force Band

Activated on 1 December 1952
Redesignated Fifteenth Air Force Band of the Golden West on 1 October 1991
Redesignated Air Mobility Command Band of the Golden West in 1994
Redesignated USAF Band of the Golden West on 1 May 1997

=== Stations ===
- Scott Field, Illinois, 1 October 1941 – c. December 1944
- Camp Shanks, New York, c. December 1944 – 15 January 1945
- Le Havre, France, 1945
- RAF Warton, 1945
- RAF Burtonwood, August 1945 – 2 December 1945
- Camp Patrick Henry, December 1945 – 15 December 1945
- March Air Force Base, California, 1 December 1952
- Travis Air Force Base, California, 1994 – present

== See also ==
- United States Air Force Band of Liberty
- United States military bands
