= United States Air Force Pipe Band =

Former U.S. Air Force highland unit

- Pipers of the Band of the Air Force Reserve Pipe Band, pictured with Sean Connery, in 2001.
- Active: 1960 – 1970
- Disbanded: 1970
- Country: United States
- Branch: United States Air Force
- Type: Military band
- Garrison/HQ: Bolling AFB, Washington D.C.

Insignia
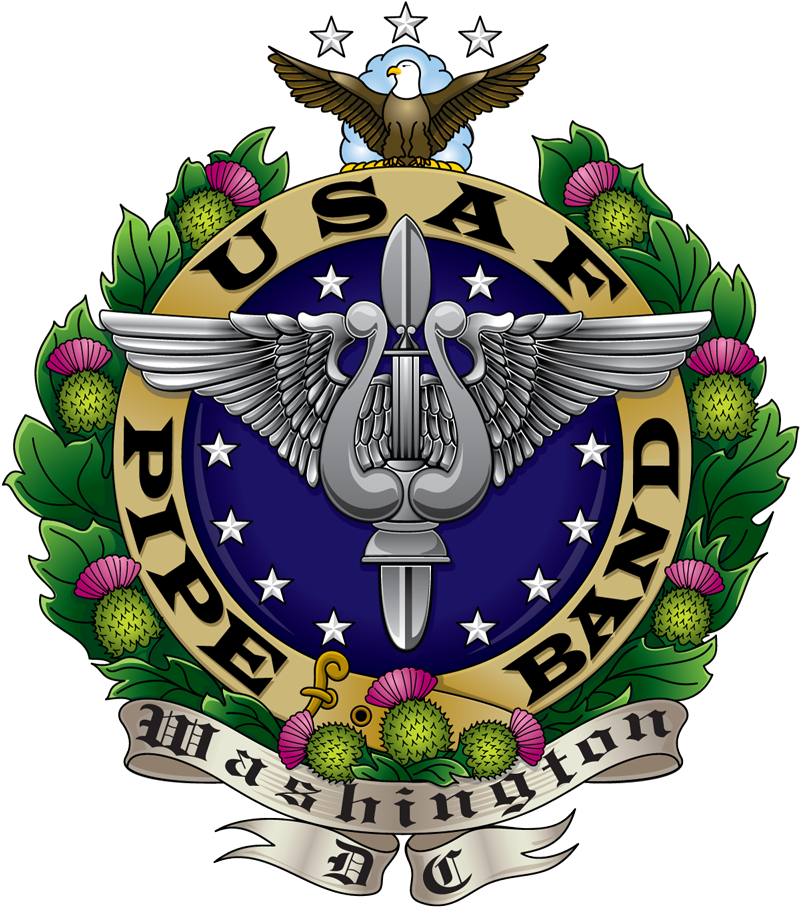
- Identification symbol

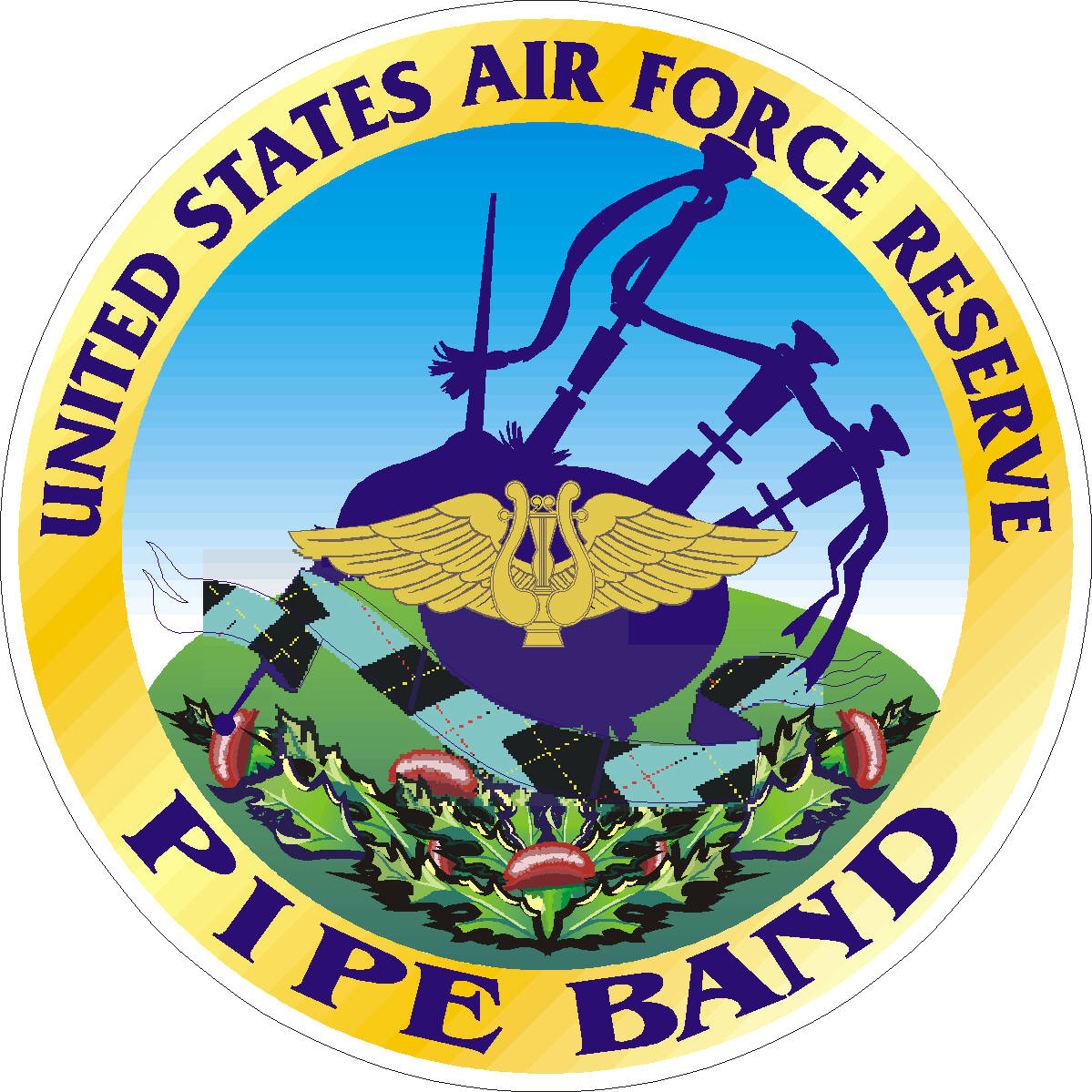
- Identification symbol

The United States Air Force Pipe Band was a highland unit of the United States Air Force. Organized in 1960 from a predecessor unit that had been activated in 1950, it was inactivated ten years later.

== History ==
The USAF Pipe Band was activated in 1950 as a subordinate unit of the United States Air Force Drum and Bugle Corps at the instigation of the chief of headquarters command at Bolling Air Force Base. Posted to Bolling Air Force Base throughout its existence, its first pipe major was "Scottie" Grubbs, formerly a piper in the Black Watch of the British Army.

Due to USAF uniform regulations, the band was not initially authorized to wear highland dress, however, an intervention by Curtis LeMay subsequently allowed its adoption.

Reestablished as an independent unit in 1960, it was inactivated in 1970 despite objections printed in several leading newspapers, including one penned by Russell Kirk. Rumors that Gen. John Dale Ryan had ordered the unit's inactivation as part of an attempt to Americanize United States military bands were rejected by officials who stated the inactivation was for cost-cutting reasons. The band's final pipe major, Norval 'Sandy' Jones, subsequently was appointed pipe major of The Citadel.

== Related units ==
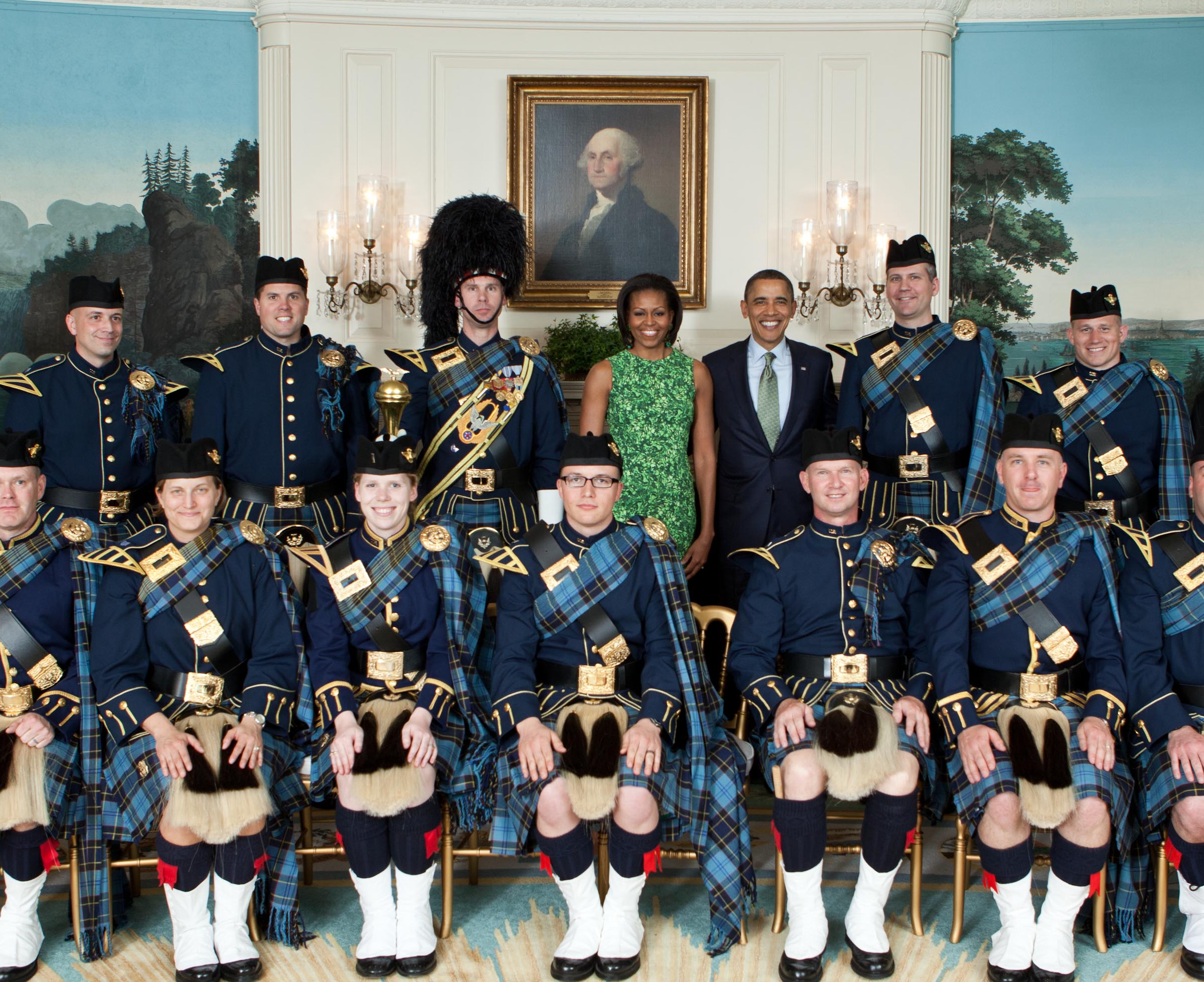
President Barack Obama with the Air Force Reserve Pipe Band.

The Band of the Air Force Reserve Pipe Band, a highland unit of the United States Air Force Reserve, was activated in 1970 and operated as a subordinate unit of the Band of the Air Force Reserve. In September 2013 the Band of the Air Force Reserve, and with it the Band of the Air Force Reserve Pipe Band, was inactivated. Following inactivation, a single piper was transferred to the United States Air Force Band as the service's sole remaining musician of this type.

The Band of the Air Force Reserve Pipe Band wore a tartan from an unclaimed design by Strathmore Woollen Company of Forfar originally known as the Lady Jane of St Cirus tartan and subsequently registered with the Scottish Tartans Society as the "US Air Force Reserve Pipe Band tartan".

== See also ==
- List of United States Air Force bands
- United States Coast Guard Pipe Band
