= United States Air Force Band of Liberty =

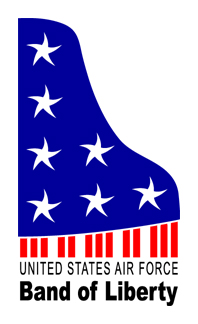
- Logo
- Active: 1978–2013
- Type: Military band
- Garrison/HQ: Hanscom Air Force Base, Massachusetts
- Motto(s): "The Air Force's; Musical Ambassadors for the Northeast"

The United States Air Force Band of Liberty was a United States military band of forty-five active duty members, based at Hanscom Air Force Base, Massachusetts. It entertains audiences in New England, New York, and New Jersey. The band was inactivated in summer 2013. Some of its personnel joined the U.S. Air Force Heritage of America Band, which took up some of its functions.

== History ==
The band is a select group of professional Airmen-musicians who support the global Air Force mission by providing musical products and services for official military, recruiting, and community relations events, and by fostering America's rich national heritage. Originally known as the 541st Air Force Band of the Southwest, stationed at Luke AFB, Arizona, the unit relocated to Pease AFB, New Hampshire in 1978. Renamed the Air Force Band of New England, the band brought its musical message of pride, patriotism, and professionalism to concerts and events throughout New England. In 1991, the band received its current name and was assigned to Electronics Systems Center, Hanscom Air Force Base, in Massachusetts. This change fostered another new name: the United States Air Force Band of Liberty.

The Band of Liberty consists of forty-five active duty personnel assigned to two primary ensembles—the Concert Band and the Afterburner popular music group. The organization has several subgroups, including the Ceremonial/Marching Band, Liberty Big Band, Colonial Brass, New England Winds woodwind quintet, and the Bay State Winds clarinet quartet. The band performs around four hundred engagements a year, and has appeared at such venues as Lincoln Center in New York City and the Hatch Shell in Boston. On 20 January 2009, the Band of Liberty's Colonial Brass provided musical support at the Farewell Ceremony of President George W. Bush. On 3 January 2007, members of the Ceremonial Band performed at Grace Episcopal Church in East Grand Rapids, Michigan for the state funeral of Gerald Ford, 38th President of the United States.

As part of larger restructuring of and cuts to military bands, the band was disbanded in mid-2013.

== Mission statement ==
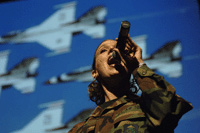
Air Force Music Professionals

Support the Global Air Force Mission—by fostering our national heritage and providing professional musical products and services for official military, recruiting, and community relations events

== Vision ==
World Class—Mission Ready Air Force Music Professionals
using the power of music to:
– Inspire our Air Force and the great nation we serve
– Produce innovative musical programs and products
– Communicate Air Force excellence

== Performing Ensembles ==
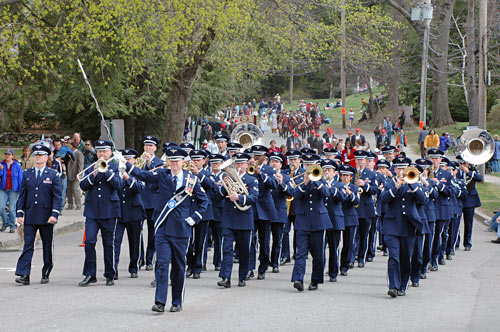
The Air Force Band of Liberty's Marching Band participated in the Patriot's Day parade, Lexington MA, 17 April 2006

- Concert Band
- The Ambassadors Big Band
- Liberty Big Band
- Afterburner pop music group
- Ceremonial/Marching Band
- Colonial Brass
- New England Winds Woodwind Quintet
- Bay State Winds Clarinet Quartet
- Liberty Saxophone Quartet
- Protocol Jazz Combos

== Discography ==
- The New England Winds/The Colonial Brass—January 2008
- On Silver Wings—Celebrating the 60th Anniversary of the U.S. Air Force—July 2007 (Concert Band)
- Sampler—May 2007 (Afterburner)
- The Most Wonderful Time—November 2006 (Concert Band/Liberty Pops)
- Rock Rhythm & Blue—July 2005 (Afterburner)
- Ain't Nothin' Nu—December 2004 (Liberty Big Band née Ambassadors Jazz Ensemble)
- New England Holidays—December 2003 (various ensembles)
- Salute to the American Spirit—July 2003 (Concert Band)

== Musician Education/Experience ==
- 41% possessed Master's degrees
- 45% possessed Bachelor's degrees
- The members of Afterburner had over 30 years combined professional music experience beyond their Air Force careers, and performed with Lee Ann Womack, Lee Greenwood, Ben Vereen, The Fabulous Thunderbirds, Rita Moreno, Phyllis Diller and Joel Grey.

== Guest Artists and Collaborations ==
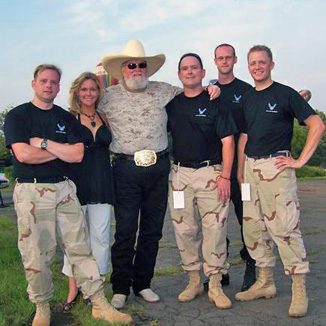
Afterburner was the opening act for the Charlie Daniels Band at the New Jersey Festival of Ballooning, Readington NJ, 29 July 2006

- The American Belles—singing/dancing trio
- Frank Battisti—Conductor Emeritus, New England Conservatory of Music
- Mike Brignola—jazz baritone saxophonist, Woody Herman and Jaco Pastorius big bands
- Ann Hampton Callaway—Broadway singer (Swing!)
- Charlie Daniels—country music artist
- Gregg Edelman—actor (Spider-Man 2) and Broadway singer (Camelot)
- Colonel (ret) Arnald D. Gabriel—Conductor Emeritus, United States Air Force Band
- Crystal Gayle—country singer
- Greg Hopkins—jazz trumpeter/composer/educator, Berklee College of Music
- Jack Jones- Jazz singer
- Darlene Love—actress (Lethal Weapon movies) and Broadway singer (Hairspray)
- Michael Maguire—Broadway singer (Les Misérables)
- Maureen McGovern—actress (Airplane! and The Towering Inferno) and Broadway singer (Little Women)
- The Mills Brothers vocal group
- Bill Pierce—jazz tenor saxophonist/educator, Berklee College of Music
- John Pizzarelli—jazz guitarist, vocalist, songwriter and bandleader
- Helen Reddy-Australian-American singer
- Byron Stripling—trumpet virtuoso
- Jiggs Whigham—jazz trombonist/educator
- Phil Wilson—jazz trombonist/composer/educator, Berklee College of Music
- Sharon "Zee" Zeffiro—classical-crossover singing sensation

== See also ==
- Hanscom Air Force Base
- United States military bands
