= List of military electronics of the United States =

This article lists American military electronic instruments/systems along with brief descriptions. This stand-alone list specifically identifies electronic devices which are assigned designations (names) according to the Joint Electronics Type Designation System (JETDS) beginning with the AN/ prefix. They are grouped below by the first designation letter following this prefix. The list is organized as sorted tables that reflect the purpose, uses and manufacturers of each listed item.

JETDS nomenclature

All electronic equipment and systems intended for use by the US military are designated using the JETDS system. The beginning of the designation for equipment/systems always begins with AN/, which only signifies that the device has a JETDS-based designation (or name). When the JETDS was originally introduced as the unclassified Joint Army-Navy Nomenclature System (JAN), AN represented all Army-Navy electronic equipment. Later, the naming method was adopted by all Department of Defense branches, and others like Australia, Canada, NATO and more.

The first letter of the designation following AN/ indicates the installation or platform where the device is used (e.g. A for piloted aircraft). That means a device with a designation beginning "AN/Axx" would typically be installed in a piloted aircraft or used to support that aircraft. The second letter indicates the type of equipment (e.g. A for invisible light). So, AN/AAx would designate a device used for piloted aircraft with invisible light (like infrared or ultraviolet light) sensing capability. The third letter designates the purpose of the device (e.g. R for receiver, or T for transmitter). After the letters that signify those things, a dash character ("-") is followed by a sequential number that represents the next design for that device. Thus as one example, AN/ALR-20 would represent:

- Installation in a piloted aircraft: A
- Type of countermeasures device: L
- Purpose of receiving: R
- Sequential design number: 20

So, the full description should be interpreted as the 20th design of an Army-Navy (or all Department of Defense) electronic device for a countermeasures signal receiver.

Due to the enormous number of United States and allied military electronic systems using the JETDS naming convention, the list has been split into two sublists. To ease navigation, below is a list of direct links to various tables in each sublist. The sublists are:

- List of military electronics of the United States: A–G
- List of military electronics of the United States: M–Z

NOTE: Letters E, H, I, J, L, N, O, Q, R, X and Y are not used in the first-position of JETDS nomenclatures.

AN/:
- Top
- A
- B
- C
- D
- F
- G
- M
- P
- S
- T
- U
- V
- W
- Z
- See also
- References
- Bibliography
- Further reading
- External links

== A – Piloted aircraft systems ==
- AAx – Invisible light/heat radiation systems
- ACx – Carrier (electronic wave or signal) systems
- ADx – Radioactivity detection, identification, and computation (RADIAC) systems
- AEx – Laser systems
- AIx – Aircraft interphone/public address systems
- AJx – Electromechanical/inertial systems
- ALx – Countermeasures systems
- AMx – Aircraft meteorological systems
- APx – Radar systems
- AQx – Aircraft sonar systems
- ARx – Radio systems
- ASx – Aircraft special-purpose/combination systems
- AVx – Visual/visible light systems
- AWx – Aircraft armament systems
- AXx – Aircraft facsimile/television systems
- AYx – Data processing/computer systems

== B – Submarine-based systems ==
- BLx – Countermeasures systems
- BPx – Radar systems
- BQx – Sonar systems
- BSx – Special-purpose/combination systems
- BYx – Data processing/computer systems

== C – Cryptographic (previously air transportable or cargo) systems ==
- CPx – Radar systems
- CRx – Radio systems
- CSx – Special-purpose/combination systems
- CYx – Data processing/computer Equipment

== D – Pilotless carrier systems ==
- DAx – Infrared systems
- DRx – Radio systems

== F – Fixed (not moving) systems ==
- FGx – Telegraph/teletype systems
- FLx – Countermeasures systems
- FMx – Meteorological systems
- FPx – Fixed radar systems
- FRx – Radio systems
- FSx – Fixed special-purpose/combination systems
- FY – Data processing/computer systems

== G – Ground-based systems ==
- GKx – Telemetering systems
- GPx – Radar systems
- GRx – Ground Radio systems
- GSx – Special-purpose/combination systems
- GVx – Ground visual/visible light systems
- GYx – Digital processing/computer systems

== M – Mobile systems ==
- MLx – Mobile countermeasures systems
- MPx – Radar systems
- MRx – Radio systems
- MSx – Special-purpose/combination systems
- MYx – Mobile data processing/computer systems

== P – Portable systems ==
- PAx – Infrared systems
- PEx – Laser systems
- PPx – Radar systems
- PRx – Radio systems
- PSx – Special-purpose/combination systems
- PVx – Visual/visible light systems
- PYx – Data processing/computer systems

== S – Water (surface ship or buoys) systems ==
- SEx – Laser systems
- SLx – Countermeasures systems
- SPx – Radar systems
- SQx – Sonar systems
- SRx – Radio systems
- SSx – Special-purpose/combination systems
- SYx – Data processing/computer systems

== T – Transportable systems ==
- TAx – Infrared systems
- TCx – Carrier (electronic wave or signal) systems
- TGx – Telegraph/teletype systems
- TLx – Countermeasures systems
- TMx – Meteorological systems
- TNx – Sound systems
- TPx – Radar systems
- TRx – Radio systems
- TSx – Special-purpose/combination systems
- TTx – Transportable telephone systems
- TVx – Visual/visible light systems
- TWx – Transportable armament systems
- TYx – Data processing/computer systems

== U – Utility systems ==
- UAx – Infrared systems
- UDx – Radioactivity detection, identification, and computation (RADIAC) systems
- UGx – Telegraph/teletype systems
- ULx – Countermeasures systems
- UPx – Radar systems
- UQx – Carrier (electronic wave or signal) systems
- URx – Radio systems
- USx – Utility special-purpose/combination systems
- UXx – Facsimile/television systems
- UYx – Data processing/computer systems

== V – Vehicular systems ==
- VPx – Radar systems
- VRx – Radio systems
- VSx – Special-purpose/combination systems

== W – Water Surface and Underwater combined systems ==
- WLx – Countermeasures systems
- WQx – Sonar systems
- WSx – Special-purpose/combination systems

== Z – Piloted/Pilotless airborne vehicle systems ==
- ZPx – Radar systems
- ZSx – Special-purpose/combination systems

== See also ==
- Signal Corps Radio – U.S. Army radio systems
- Category:Military electronics of the United States
- Wikipedia:Stand-alone lists

=== Lists ===
- List of equipment of the United States Armed Forces
- List of equipment of the United States Air Force
- List of equipment of the United States Army
- List of equipment of the United States Coast Guard
- List of equipment of the United States Marine Corps
- List of equipment of the United States Navy
- List of United States radar types
- List of U.S. Signal Corps Vehicles (V-list)
- List of World War II electronic warfare equipment

== Bibliography ==
The following reference material applies to both of the sub-list articles, and is listed here for continuity and context:

- Army Science Board (January 1979). Military Operations in Built-Up Areas (MOBA) (PDF) (Report). Washington, D.C.: Office of the Assistant of the Army. DTIC ADB034309. (155 pages)
- Bittencourt, Raul Pereira (June 1976). Electronic warfare technology (PDF) (Electrical Engineer thesis). Monterey, California: Naval Postgraduate School. hdl:10945/17747. DTIC ADA028210. (147 pages)
- Caton, Maj Scott William (August 1980). Landing Force Organizational systems Study (LFOSS) Annual Report for 1979 (LFOSS-79) (PDF) (Report). Quantico, Virginia: Headquarters, US Marine Corps. DTIC ADA118028. (371 pages)
- Crawford, Richard H; Cook, Lindsey F (9 April 1952). United States Army in World War II - Statistics - Procurement (PDF). Office of the Chief of Military History - Department of the Army. (96 pages)
- DoD (1964). Department of Defense Appropriations for Fiscal Year 1965. Washington, D.C.: United States Government Printing Office. (1,744 pages)
- Fales, David; Lorence, Robert J; Hauptman, Robert; Day, John M; Hesse, George L (May 1967). ECOM-0006-1 High Altitude Radio Relay systems - Semi-Annual Report (PDF) (Report). Fort Monmouth, New Jersey: US Army Communications-Electronics Command. DTIC AD0659400. (323 pages)
- Gaitanakis, George-Konstantinos; Vlastaras, Andreas; Vassos, Nikolaos; Limnaios, George; Zikidis, Konstantinos C (2019). "Infrared Search and Track systems as an Anti-Stealth Approach" (PDF). Journal of Computation & Modelling. 9 (1). Scientific Press: 33–53. ISSN 1792-8850. (21 pages)
- Hanlon, Edward (1 October 2004). Marine Corps Order 1510.90A Individual Training Standards for Marine Corps Common Skills, Volume II - Corporal through Captain (PDF). Washington, D.C.: Headquarters, US Marine Corps. (379 pages)
- Holler, Roger A (January 2014). The Evolution of the Sonobuoy from World War Ii to the Cold War (U) (PDF). Navmar Applied Sciences Corporation. (27 pages)
- Jewell, Larry; Clancey, Patrick (20 November 1945). Radar Bulletin NO. 2A (RADTWO A) - The Tactical Use of Radar in Aircraft. Navy Department - Chief of Naval Operations. (173 pages)
- JPRS Report (29 December 1987). Soviet Union, Foreign Military Review, No. 6 (PDF) (Report). Arlington, Virginia: Joint Publications Research Service. DTIC ADA348280. (53 pages)
- JPRS Report (10 May 1988). Soviet Union, Foreign Military Review, No. 11 (PDF) (Report). Arlington, Virginia: Joint Publications Research Service. DTIC ADA347206. (48 pages)
- Kleinschmidt (February 1970). Military Telecommunications Equipment (PDF) (Product Catalog). Deerfield, Illinois: Kleinschmidt. (61 pages)
- McMican, LCDR William J; Richards, LCDR James J (March 1985). Shipboard Non-Tactical Computer systems of the US Navy (PDF) (Master of Science in Information Systems thesis). Monterey, California: Naval Postgraduate School. DTIC ADA156769. (129 pages)
- MIL-HDBK-162A (15 December 1965). "Radar Equipment". TM 11-487C-1 Military Standardization Handbook United States (PDF) (Technical Manual). Vol. 1. Washington, D.C.: Headquarters, Department of the Army. (1,531 pages)
- NAVPERS (1969). NAVPERS-10794-C Shipboard Electronic Equipments (PDF) (Report). Washington, D.C.: Bureau of Naval Personnel. (232 pages)
- NAVSHIPS (December 1965). "Section 4.12 - Miscellaneous Test Equipment". NAVSHIPS 94200.4-2 - Supplement 2: Directory of Electronics Test Equipment (PDF) (Technical Manual). Great Lakes, Illinois: US Navy Electronics Supply Office. (222 pages)
- Petterson, Göran Sven Erik (September 1993). An illustrated overview of ESM and ECM systems (PDF). CORE (Master of Science in systems Engineering thesis). Naval Postgraduate School. p. 85. (145 pages)
- Pollock, David (1996). "Countermeasure systems". In Accetta, Joseph S; Shumaker, David L (eds.). The Infrared and Electro-optical systems Handbook (PDF). Vol. 7. Bellingham, Washington: SPIE. ISBN 0819410721. OCLC 912063854. DTIC ADA364021. (520 pages)
- Shyu, Heidi (2012). "Clip-on Sniper Night Sight (SNS)". Weapon systems 2012 - America's Army: The Strength of the Nation (PDF). US Army. (384 pages)
- Teague, James "Ralph"; Schmieder, David (October 2021). The History of Forward-Looking Infrared (FLIR) (PDF) (Report). Defense Systems Information Analysis Center. (127 pages)
- Travis, Maj Kenneth L (12 May 1988). The Integration of US Army Electronic Warfare Capabilities in J-SEAD Operations (PDF) (Report). Maxwell AFB, Alabama: Air Command and Staff College, Air University. DTIC ADA192616. (44 pages)
- Wahl, Katrina G; Riordan, James L (30 December 2005). TM 2000-OD/2C Principal Technical Characteristics of US Marine Corps Communication-Electronics Equipment (PDF) (Technical Manual). Quantico, Virginia: US Marine Corps. (364 pages)
