= NMO =

NMO may refer to:

- Neuromyelitis optica, also known as Devic's disease or Devic's syndrome
- N-Methylmorpholine N-oxide, an organic compound
- Nitronate monooxygenase, an enzyme
- Normal Move Out, in reflection seismology
- National Measurement Office, a government agency in the United Kingdom
- New Motorola, a mobile antenna connector
- COMMSTA NMO, a United States Coast Guard Communication Station in Honolulu, Hawaii
- Station code for Nambo railway station, Indonesia
