= List of equipment of the United States Coast Guard =

The progress of the United States Coast Guard acquisition programs as of June 2023. As of 2026, United States Coast Guard (USCG) has been ranked the largest coast guard in the world.

This is the list of equipment of the United States Coast Guard.

== Watercraft ==
=== Cutters ===
Originally, the Coast Guard used the term cutter in its traditional sense, as a type of small sailing ship.

Larger cutters, over 181 feet (55 m) in length, are controlled by Area Commands, the Atlantic Area or Pacific Area. Smaller cutters come under control of district commands. Cutters usually carry a motor surf boat and/or a rigid-hulled inflatable boat. Polar-class icebreakers (WAGB) carry an Arctic survey boat (ASB) and landing craft.

Any Coast Guard crew with officers or petty officers assigned has law-enforcement authority (14 USC Sec. 89) and can conduct armed boardings.

The Coast Guard operates 243 Cutters, defined as any vessel more than 65 feet (20 m) long, that has a permanently assigned crew and accommodations for the extended support of that crew.

Class is currently being built and currently active
Class is currently being replaced
Class is currently being built and not yet active

Name or Class	Image	Quantity	Length	Armament	Notes
Polar-class 2		0	460'	2 × Mk 44 30 mm autocannon; 6 × crew-served .50 caliber (12.7 mm) Browning M2 machine guns	Building 2, 3 total on order. The Polar Security Cutter Program is to replace the Polar-class. To enter service in 2025.
Healy-class		1	420'	Various small arms	Medium class icebreaker used for icebreaking and research. Entered service in 2000.
Legend-class		10	418'	1 × MK 110 57mm gun a variant of the Bofors 57 mm gun and Gunfire Control System; 1 × 20 mm Block 1B Baseline 2 Phalanx Close-In Weapons System; 4 × crew-served .50 caliber (12.7 mm) Browning M2 machine guns; 2 × crew-served M240B 7.62 mm machine guns; Various small arms	10 Active; Building 1; Option for 12th. Designated to replace the Hamilton-class. Entered Service in 2008.
Polar-class		1	399'	Various small arms	USCGC Polar Star (WAGB-10) is only active heavy icebreaker. Entered service in 1976. USCGC Polar Sea (WAGB-11) is located in Seattle, Washington but is not currently in active service.
USCGC Storis		1	360'	None	The only Anchor handling tug supply vessel icebreaker and recently acquired in 2024. Planned to be in service in 2026 and will be homeported in Juneau, Alaska but is not currently in active service.
Heritage-class		0	360'	1 x MK 110 57 mm gun a variant of the Bofors 57 mm gun and Gunfire Control System; 1 x BAE Systems Mk 38 Mod 3 25 mm gun with 7.62 mm co-axial gun; 2 x M2 Browning .50 caliber (12.7 mm) machine guns mounted on a MK 50 Stabilized Small Arms Mount (SSAM); 4 x crew-served M2 Browning .50 caliber (12.7 mm) machine guns; Various small arms	3 under construction; 12 ordered or optioned; 25 total planned. Designated to replace the Famous-class and Reliance-class. To enter service in 2025.
USCGC Eagle		1	295'	None	USCGC Eagle (WIX-327): Eagle is home ported at the Coast Guard Academy in New London, Connecticut. It is used for training voyages for Coast Guard Academy cadets and Coast Guard officer candidates. USCGC Eagle was built in Germany as the Horst Wessel, and was taken by the United States as a war reparation in 1945.
USCGC Alex Haley		1	283'	2 × Mk 38 Mod 1 25 mm gun; 2 × .50 caliber (12.7 mm) machine guns; Various small arms	Entered service in 1971 as USS Edenton.
Famous-class		13	270'	1 × OTO Melara Mark 75 76 mm/62 caliber naval gun; 2 × .50 caliber (12.7 mm) machine guns; Various small arms	Entered service in 1983.
USCGC Mackinaw		1	240'	2 × crew-served M240B 7.62 mm machine guns; Various small arms	Mackinaw is a 240-foot (73 m) heavy icebreaker built for operations on the North American Great Lakes and home ported at Cheboygan, Michigan. Entered Service in 2006.
Juniper-class		16	225'	2 × .50 caliber (12.7 mm) machine guns; Various small arms	Entered service in 1996.
Reliance-class		14	210'	1 ×Mk 38 Mod 1 25 mm gun; 2 × .50 caliber (12.7 mm) machine guns; Various small arms	Entered service in 1964.
Keeper-class		14	175'	None	Entered service in 1997.
160-ft inland construction tender		4	160'	None	Entered service in 1976.
Sentinel-class		62	154'	1 × Mk 38 Mod 2 25 mm autocannon; 4 × crew-served Browning M2 machine guns	77 planned. Designated to replace Island-class. Entered service in 2012.
Bay-class		9	140'	2 × M240 machine guns	10 planned. Entered service in 1979.
Island-class		49	110'	Mk 38 Mod 1 25 mm chain gun; 2 × M2 .50-cal MG	(WPB): Eight additional 110-foot patrol boats were extended to 123 feet (37 m) but structural issues developed shortly after these conversions and the cutters were deemed unsafe to operate. Entered service in 1985.
100-ft inland buoy tender		2	100'	None	Entered service in 1945.
100-ft inland construction tender		3	100'	None	Entered service in 1944.
Marine Protector-class		67	87'	2 × .50 caliber M2 Browning machine guns	Entered service in 1998. Sea PROTECTOR MK50 GWS Carried on four Marine Protector Class Cutters.
Kankakee-class		2	75'	None	Entered service in 1990.
Gasconade-class		9	75'	Various small arms	Entered Service in 1964
75-ft inland construction tender		9	75'	None	Entered service in 1962
65-ft river buoy tender		2	65'	None	
65-ft inland buoy tender		2	65'	None	Entered service in 1954
65-ft small harbor tug		11	65'	None	(WYTL): This is a class of eleven 65-foot tugs used by the United States Coast Guard for search and rescue, law enforcement, aids-to-navigation work and light icebreaking. Entered service in 1961.

=== Boats ===
The Coast Guard operates about 1,402 boats, defined as any vessel less than 65 feet (20 meters) in length, which generally operate near shore and on inland waterways. The most common is 25 feet (7.6 m) long, of which the Guard has more than 350. The shortest is 13 feet (4.0 m).

Name	Image	Length	Notes
65-ft Aids to Navigation Boat		64'	
64-ft Screening Vessel		64'	
55-ft Aids to Navigation Boat		55'	
52-ft Motor Lifeboat		52'	The Coast Guard currently has four of the 52-foot motor life boats, a craft designed from the ground up to serve in challenging surf conditions. All four craft are currently assigned to surf stations in the Pacific Northwest. Also known as "Special Purpose Craft - Heavy Weather (SPC-HWX)"
49-ft Buoy Utility Stern Loading		49'	
47-ft Motor Lifeboat		47'	The Coast Guard's 47-foot primary heavy-weather boat used for search and rescue as well as law enforcement and homeland security.
Response Boat – Medium		45'	The Coast Guard has signed a multi-year contract for 180 Response Boat – Medium (RB-M) boats that were delivered starting in 2008 to replace the 41′ UTB boats. These aluminum boats are 45 feet (14 m) in length, with twin diesel engines (total 825 hp), are self-righting, have a four crew, six passenger capacity, are equippable with two .50 caliber machine guns, have an excellent fendering system, can achieve a top speed of 42 knots (78 km/h), and are capable of towing a 100-ton vessel in eight-foot seas. The boats were built by Kvichak Marine Industries of Kent, Washington and Marinette Marine of Manitowoc, Wisconsin.
Near-Shore Life Boat		42'	
39-ft Tactical Training Boat		39'	
38-ft Training Boat		38'	
Arctic Survey Boat		38'	Only one of these vessels is used by the Coast Guard. It is kept on the USCGC Healy and is used for arctic studies.
36-ft Boarding Team Delivery		36'	
Long-Range Interceptor		36'	An 11-meter (36-foot) high-speed launch that can be launched from the rear ramps of the National Security Cutters.
33-ft Law Enforcement		33'	
26-ft Trailerable Aids to Navigation Boat		29'	
Response boat – Small II		29'	A 29-foot replacement for the Defender Class, built by Metal Shark Boats.
Cutter Boat – Over the Horizon		25'	
Transportable port security boat		25'	25-foot (7.6 m) boat, based on the commercial version of the 25-foot (8 m) center-console Boston Whaler, suitable for work in inland waters, easily transportable by trailer. These are primarily used by Port Security Units for force protection in naval support areas abroad, as well as, ports of embarkation/debarkation in expeditionary areas. Most recently these boats and units were deployed to Kuwait in support of Operation Iraqi Freedom. The durability, versatility, and mobility of these boats make them ideal for this type of operation.
Response boat – Small		25'	A high-speed boat, for a variety of missions, including search and rescue, port security and law enforcement duties. The original 25-foot boats built by SAFE Boats International (Secure All-around Flotation Equipped) of Port Orchard, Washington are being replaced by 29-foot boats built by Metal Shark Boats of Jeanerette, LA.
24-ft Shallow Water		24'	
24-ft Cutter Boat – Aids to Navigation – Large		23'	
Cutter Boat – Over the Horizon		24'-19'	
22-ft Airboat		22'	
20-ft Aids to Navigation Boat – Small		21'	
20-ft Airboat		20'	
18-ft Cutter Boat – Aids to Navigation – Medium		18'	
18-ft Airboat		18'	
Cutter Boat – Medium		17'	
16-ft Aids to Navigation Boat – Skiff		16'	
Cutter Boat – Small		13'	

USCG Auxiliary

- Auxiliary Operational Facilities: The Coast Guard surface fleet is augmented by privately owned vessels operated by the United States Coast Guard Auxiliary.

== Aircraft ==
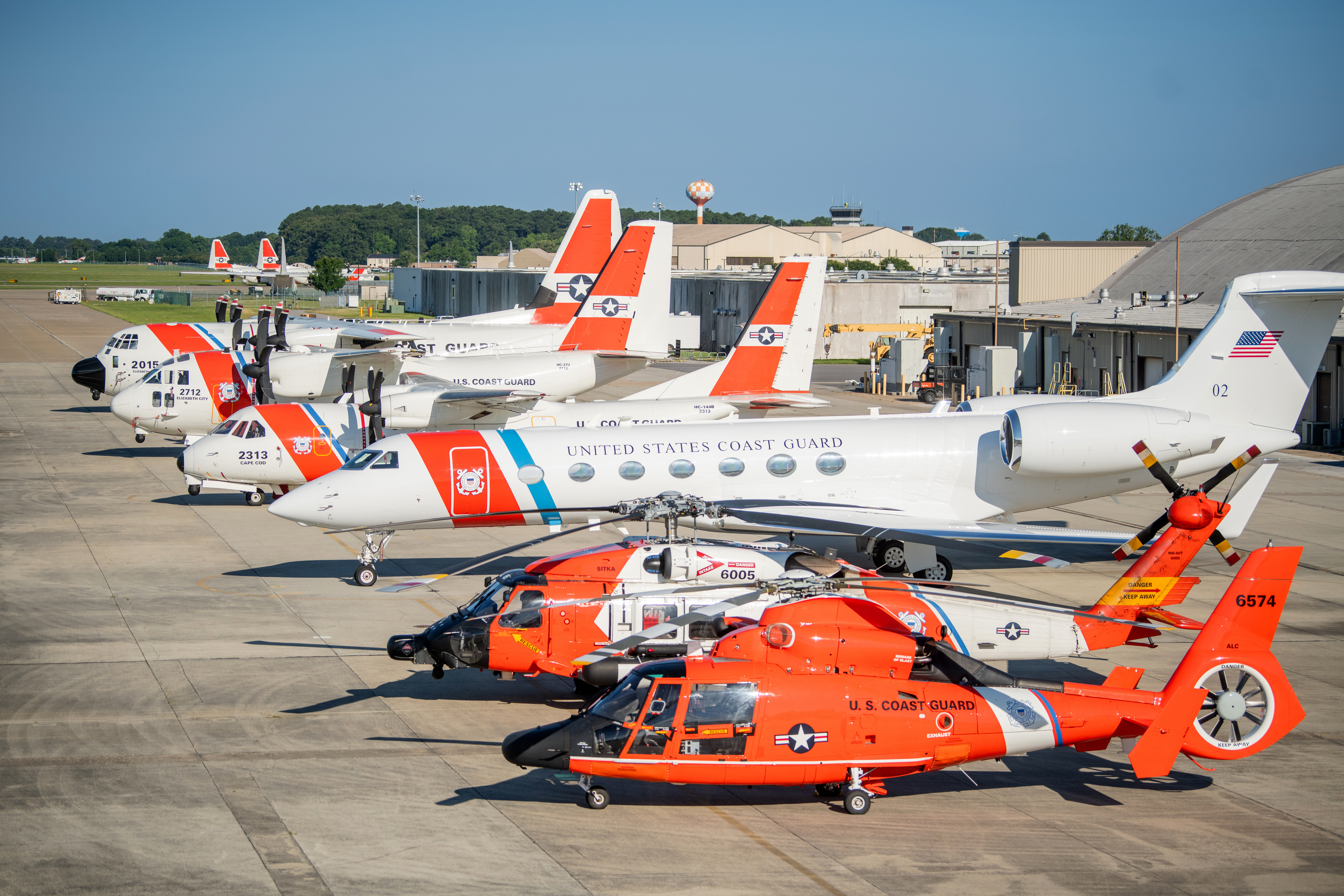
Every aircraft in the U.S. Coast Guard fleet in June 2024. From left: HC-130, C-27J, HC-144, C-37, MH-60T, MH-65

The Coast Guard operates about 210 aircraft. Fixed-wing aircraft, such as Lockheed HC-130 Hercules turboprops, operate from Air Stations on long-duration missions. Helicopters (Aérospatiale HH-65 Dolphin and Sikorsky HH-60T Jayhawk) operate from Air Stations, Air Facilities, and flight-deck equipped cutters and can rescue people or intercept smuggling vessels. Some helicopters are armed and equipped with armor to protect against small arms fire.

U.S. Military aircraft are designated using the "1962 United States Tri-Service aircraft designation system." The system designates aircraft by Basic Mission in the case of fixed wing, manned, powered, conventional take off and landing aircraft and by Vehicle Type and Basic Mission in the case of all other aircraft (Helicopters, UAVs, Gliders, VSTOL). A Modified Mission code may be added in front of the Basic Mission code to further define the mission of multi-role aircraft or to define the mission of an aircraft after it has been modified or adapted for a different mission than its original designation indicates. In some cases a Modified Mission code is used in lieu of the Basic Mission code where no basic mission code exists which adequately defines the mission of the aircraft. "MDS" ("Mission", "Design", "Series") is shorthand to describe this system. The legacy term "TMS" ("Type", "Model", "Series") is sometimes still used by the U.S. Navy, Marine Corps and Coast Guard instead of MDS.

Aircraft are presented in this table grouped by their basic function. The third column defines their Basic or Modified mission codes and the fourth column lists the actual role or roles in which the aircraft is used by the Coast Guard.

Aircraft	Image	Modified Mission	Role	#In Service	Notes
Basic Mission: "C" Cargo
C-37A Gulfstream V C-37B Gulfstream G550			Long Range Command and Control (Executive Transport)	1 each	
HC-130J Hercules		Modified Mission: H-Search and Rescue and MEDEVAC	Long Range Surveillance	19	6 on order
HC-27J Spartan		Modified Mission: H-Search and Rescue and MEDEVAC	Medium Range Surveillance	11	To retire by 2028 (Note: 13 were acquired from USAF and one From L3 technologies. All were to be missionized but structural problems were discovered and USCG decided to retire the fleet by 2028 rather than absorb the cost of a fix)
HC-144B Ocean Sentry		Modified Mission: H-Search and Rescue and MEDEVAC	Medium Range Surveillance	18	
Vehicle Type: "H" Helicopter
MH-60T Jayhawk		Modified Mission: M-Multi-mission (Note: "M" is a Modified Mission code which was used in this case in lieu of a Basic Mission code)	Long Range Recovery	50	Fleet to expand to 127 aircraft to replace Dolphin.
MH-65E Dolphin		Modified Mission: M-Multi-mission	Short Range Recovery	90	To be retired by 2037
Vehicle Type: "Q" Unmanned Aerial Vehicle (Note: Only Group 4 and 5 aircraft are listed here. Group 4 and 5 air vehicles are large vehicles with at least 1320lb maximum gross take off weight which are piloted by a winged Coast Guard Naval Aviator or Aerial Vehicle Pilot qualified to fly the specific aircraft. An Aerial Vehicle Pilot is a Commissioned Coast Guard Officer who has completed the Naval Air Training Command training program resulting in award of Aerial Vehicle Pilot wings.)
MQ-9B SeaGuardian		Modified Mission: M-Multi-mission (Note: "M" is a Modified Mission code which was used in this case in lieu of a Basic Mission code)	Long Range Unmanned Aircraft System	0	Four on order, delivery 2028-2029 (Note: an additional two were requested in the FY2026 budget) (Note: USCG is currently operating MQ-9As on loan from Customs and Border Protection (CBP))

Medium Range Unmanned Aircraft Systems consist of Group 2 and 3 air vehicles weighing less than 1300lbs which are contractor operated aboard Cutters and shore bases. Short Range Unmanned Aircraft Systems are Group 1 air vehicles weighing up to 20lbs which are operated as a collateral duty by Coast Guard Personnel (Note: in 2026 the USCG created an enlisted Robotics Mission Specialist (RMS) rating and a Chief Warrant Officer Robotics Mission Manager (RMM) specialty which will begin to assume responsibility for many Group 1 through 3 UAV operations)

From 1988 to 1996 the Coast Guard operated two RG-8A Condor aircraft from Coast Guard Air Station Miami. In addition to regular Coast Guard aircraft, privately owned general aviation aircraft are used by Coast Guard Auxiliarists for patrols and search-and-rescue missions.

== Land vehicles ==
Name	Image	Origin	Notes
HMMWV		United States	Used primarily by Deployable Specialized Forces
LSSV		United States	

== Electronic Warfare Systems ==
- Sea Commander Aegis derived combat system
- SCCS-Lite combat data system
- AN/SLQ-32B(V)2 Electronic Warfare System
- L-3 C4ISR suite
- AN/SPS-78 surface search and navigation radar
- AN/SPS-50 surface search radar
- AN/APX-123(V)1 IFF (ship automation provided by MTU Callosum)

== Shipboard Weapon Systems ==
Name	Image	Notes
M153 CROWS II		Sea PROTECTOR MK50 GWS
Mk 38 25mm autocannon		Mod 1, Mod 2 and Mod 3
Mk 44 30mm autocannon		
Phalanx CIWS		20 mm Block 1B Baseline 2
Bofors 57 mm gun		MK 110. A variant of the Bofors 57 mm gun and Gunfire Control System
OTO Melara Mark 75		76 mm/62 caliber naval gun

== Decoys and Countermeasures ==
Name	Image	Notes
Mark 36 SRBOC		chaff countermeasures
Nulka		MK 53 Mod 10

== Weapons ==
Model	Image	Caliber	Type	Origin	Details
P229R-DAK		.40 S&W	Pistol	Germany	Former service pistol
Glock 19		9mm	Pistol	Austria	Standard service pistol. Replacing the Sig P229R-DAK
Colt M1911 Gold Medal Match		.45 ACP	Pistol	United States	Utilized exclusively for Excellence in Competition (EIC)
M16A2		5.56×45mm NATO	Assault rifle	United States	Limited service
M4		5.56×45mm NATO	Assault rifle, Carbine	United States	Standard issue service rifle. The Deployable Operations Group also employs the Mk 18 upper receiver
MK18/CQBR		5.56×45mm NATO	Assault rifle, Carbine	United States	Standard issue service carbine. The Deployable Specialized Forces also employs them
M870P		12-gauge	Shotgun	United States	
Saiga-12		12-gauge	Shotgun	Russia	The Deployable Specialized Forces employs them
M240		7.62×51mm NATO	General purpose, medium machine gun	United States	M240B variant is employed aboard surface vessels while the M240H is used aboard the MH-60 Jayhawk and MH-65 Dolphin helicopters. The M240 is also used on land by Port Security Units
M249		5.56×45mm NATO	Light machine gun	United States	Used on various boats and primarily by Deployable Specialized Forces
M60		7.62×51mm NATO	General purpose, medium machine gun	United States	Used on various boats such as the Defender-class boat
Browning M2HB		.50 BMG	Heavy machine gun	United States	Primarily mounted on seagoing vessels. Some machine guns are used on land by Port Security Units
MK14 EBR		7.62×51mm NATO	Designated marksman rifle, Sniper rifle	United States	Variant known as the M14 Tactical fitted with the Mk 14 Enhanced Battle Rifle stock, with a 22-inch barrel and a Smith Enterprise muzzle brake.
Mk 11		7.62×51mm NATO	Designated marksman rifle, Sniper rifle	United States	Used by the Deployable Specialized Forces
Barrett 50 cal/M82/M107		.50 BMG	Anti materiel sniper rifle	United States	Used for Airborne Use of Force (AUF) missions
Robar RC-50		.50 BMG	Anti materiel sniper rifle	United States	
M203		40mm	Grenade launcher	United States	Single-shot underbarrel grenade launcher
Mk 19		40mm	Automatic grenade launcher	United States	Belt-fed
MK3 grenade			Concussion Grenade	United States	Used as an anti-swimmer grenade. Being phased out and being replaced by a newer Anti-Swimmer Grenade.

== Communications ==
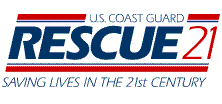
Rescue 21 Logo.

Coast Guard radio stations cover a wide geographical area using very high frequency and high frequency radios. There are eight major radio stations covering long-range transmissions and an extensive network of VHF radio stations along the nation's coastline and inland rivers.

The current communication system is the Rescue 21. Rescue 21 is an advanced maritime command, control, and communications (C3) system.

The OMEGA navigation system and the LORAN-C transmitters outside the USA were run until 1994 also by the United States Coast Guard, and LORAN-C transmitters within the US were decommissioned in June 2010, with the exception of 5 CONUS LORAN-C stations that continue to be staffed due to international agreements.

== See also ==
- Equipment of the United States Army
- Equipment of the United States Air Force
- Equipment of the United States Navy
- Equipment of the United States Marine Corps
