= List of equipment of the United States Navy =

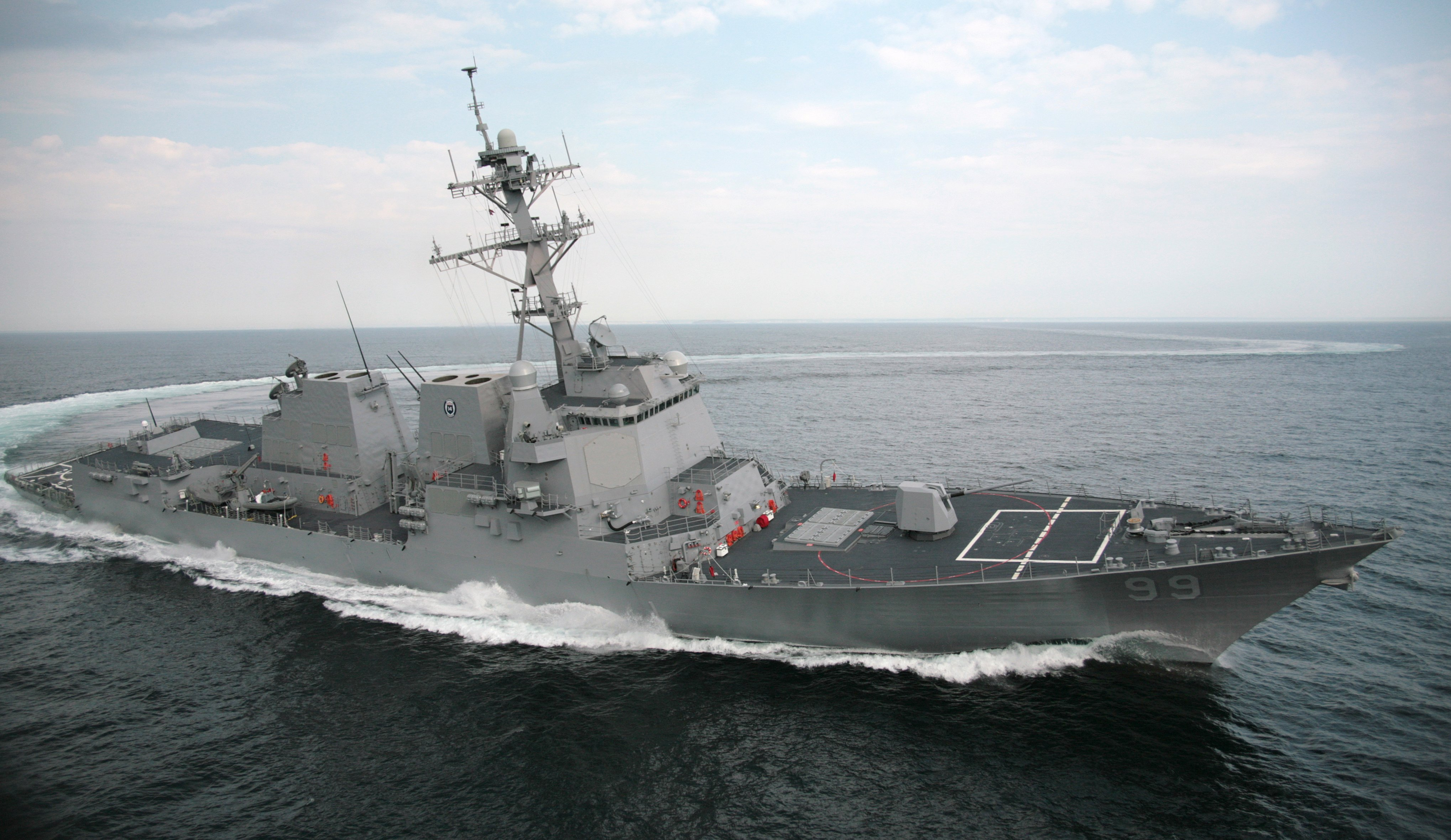
USS Farragut (DDG-99), an Arleigh Burke-class Aegis combat system-equipped guided missile destroyer. The class has become the longest production run for any post-World War II U.S. Navy surface combatant, with the potential to exceed over a hundred ships.

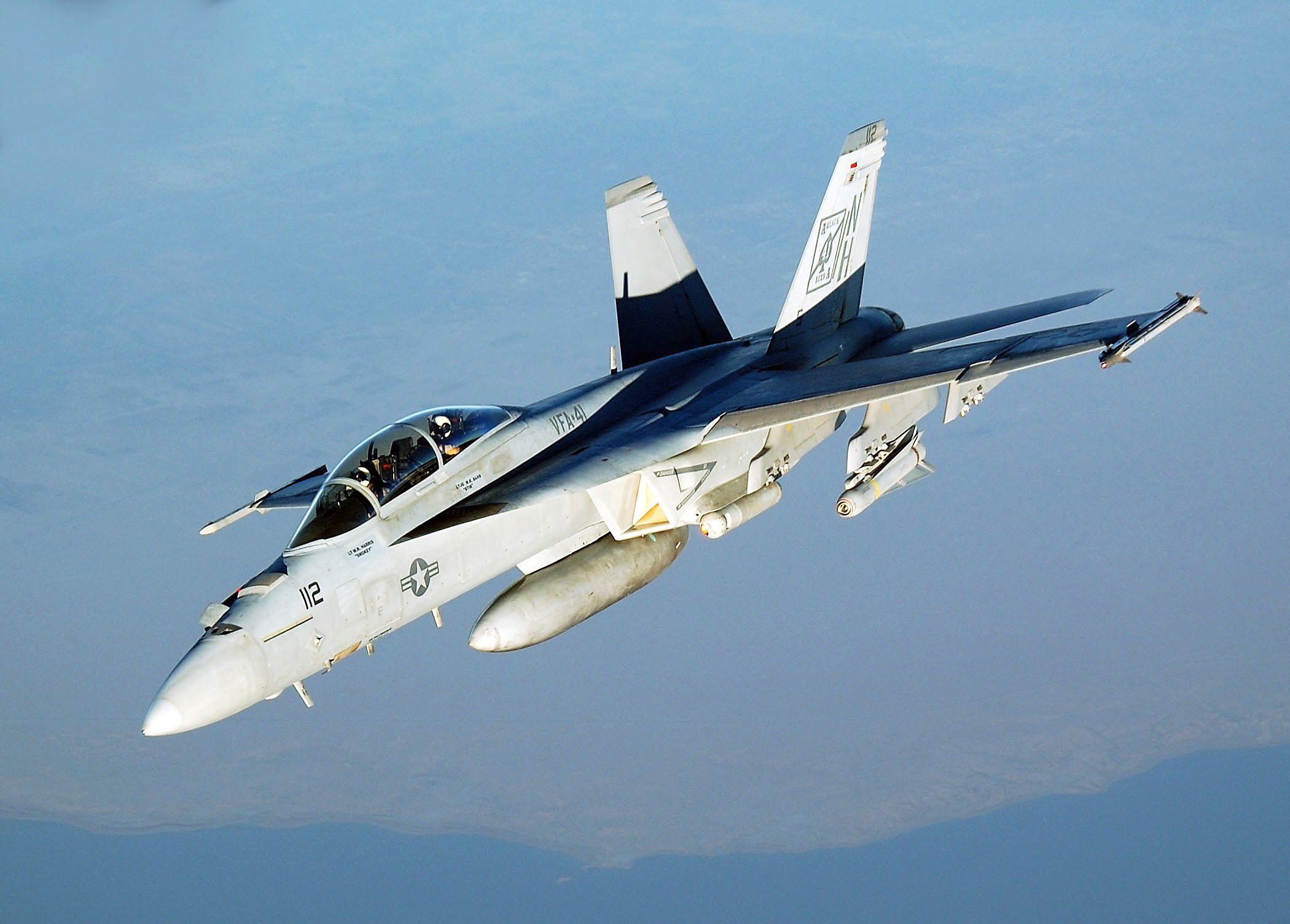
The Boeing F/A-18E/F Super Hornet, a twin-engine, carrier-capable, multirole jet fighter.

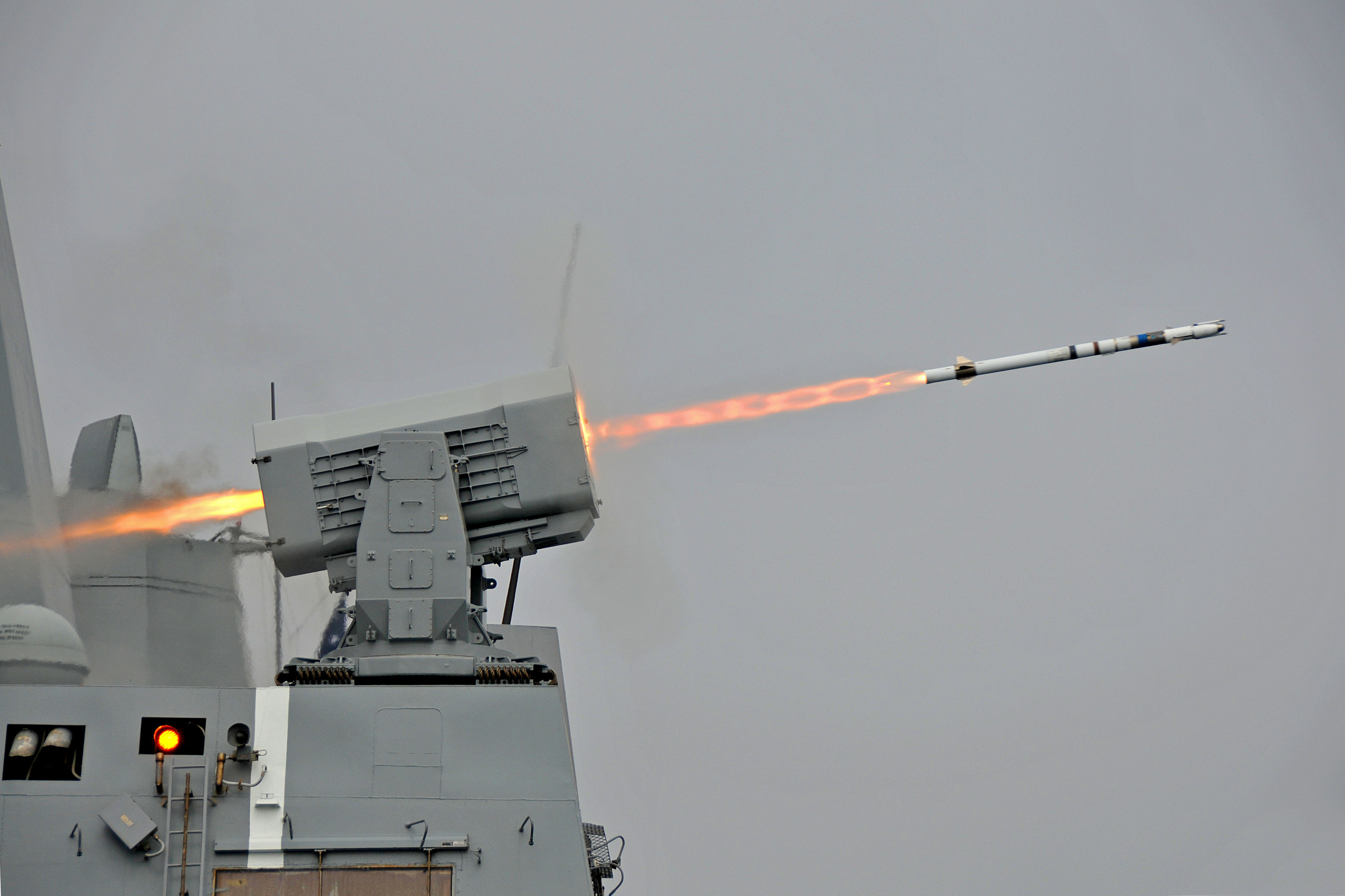
A RIM-116 Rolling Airframe Missile system

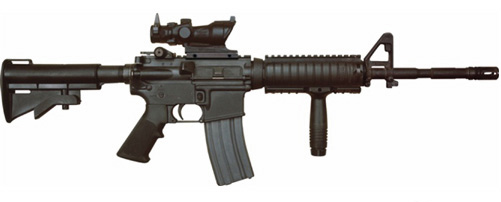
The M4, a 5.56×45mm (NATO cartridge), air-cooled, direct impingement gas-operated, magazine-fed, carbine-length assault rifle, based on the M16 family of service weapons.

The equipment of the United States Navy has been subdivided into: watercraft, aircraft, munitions, vehicles, and small arms.

== Submarines ==
Commissioned submarines and surface ships (arranged by class and displacement)

Class	Image	Individual boats	Notes
Ballistic missile submarine (14)
Ohio		USS Henry M. Jackson (SSBN-730); USS Alabama (SSBN-731); USS Alaska (SSBN-732); USS Nevada (SSBN-733); USS Tennessee (SSBN-734); USS Pennsylvania (SSBN-735); USS West Virginia (SSBN-736); USS Kentucky (SSBN-737); USS Maryland (SSBN-738); USS Nebraska (SSBN-739); USS Rhode Island (SSBN-740); USS Maine (SSBN-741); USS Wyoming (SSBN-742); USS Louisiana (SSBN-743)	14 in service
Cruise missile submarine (4)
Ohio		USS Ohio (SSGN-726); USS Michigan (SSGN-727); USS Florida (SSGN-728); USS Georgia (SSGN-729)	4 in service, Converted from SSBNs to SSGNs in 2007
Attack (48)
Los Angeles		USS Pasadena (SSN-752); USS Albany (SSN-753); USS Topeka (SSN-754); USS Scranton (SSN-756); USS Asheville (SSN-758); USS Jefferson City (SSN-759); USS Annapolis (SSN-760); USS Springfield (SSN-761); USS Columbus (SSN-762); USS Santa Fe (SSN-763); USS Montpelier (SSN-765); USS Charlotte (SSN-766); USS Hampton (SSN-767); USS Hartford (SSN-768); USS Toledo (SSN-769); USS Tucson (SSN-770); USS Columbia (SSN-771); USS Greeneville (SSN-772); USS Cheyenne (SSN-773)	Total 19 in service, 10 planned for retirement before 2030
Seawolf		USS Seawolf (SSN-21); USS Connecticut (SSN-22); USS Jimmy Carter (SSN-23)	Total 3 in service, 29 planned, 26 canceled
Virginia		Block I USS Virginia (SSN-774); USS Texas (SSN-775); USS Hawaii (SSN-776); USS North Carolina (SSN-777); Block II; USS New Hampshire (SSN-778); USS New Mexico (SSN-779); USS Missouri (SSN-780); USS California (SSN-781); USS Mississippi (SSN-782); USS Minnesota (SSN-783); Block III; USS North Dakota (SSN-784); USS John Warner (SSN-785); USS Illinois (SSN-786); USS Washington (SSN-787); USS Colorado (SSN-788); USS Indiana (SSN-789); USS South Dakota (SSN-790); USS Delaware (SSN-791); Block IV; USS Vermont (SSN-792); USS Oregon (SSN-793); USS Montana (SSN-794); USS Hyman G. Rickover (SSN-795); USS New Jersey (SSN-796); USS Iowa (SSN-797); USS Massachusetts (SSN-798); USS Idaho (SSN-799)	Total 66 planned, 26 in service, 8 under construction, 43 on order (most out of any class).
Submersibles
Mk VIII SDV			
SWCS SDV			4 planned for active service
Deep Drone 8000 Unmanned Underwater Vehicle			
Deep-submergence rescue vehicle			

== Surface ships ==
=== Aircraft carriers ===
Class	Image	Individual ships	Notes
Aircraft carriers (11)
Gerald R. Ford		USS Gerald R. Ford (CVN-78)	10 planned, 1 in service, 1 Undergoing sea trials and 1 under construction.
Nimitz		USS Nimitz (CVN-68); USS Dwight D. Eisenhower (CVN-69); USS Carl Vinson (CVN-70); USS Theodore Roosevelt (CVN-71); USS Abraham Lincoln (CVN-72); USS George Washington (CVN-73); USS John C. Stennis (CVN-74); USS Harry S. Truman (CVN-75); USS Ronald Reagan (CVN-76); USS George H.W. Bush (CVN-77)	10 carriers of the Nimitz class are in service. Lead carrier (USS Nimitz CVN-68) is scheduled for retirement in March 2027

=== Amphibious warfare ships ===
Class	Image	Individual ships	Notes
Amphibious assault ships (9)
America		USS America (LHA-6); USS Tripoli (LHA-7)	11 planned, 2 in service, 2 under construction
Wasp		USS Wasp (LHD-1); USS Essex (LHD-2); USS Kearsarge (LHD-3); USS Boxer (LHD-4); USS Bataan (LHD-5); USS Iwo Jima (LHD-7); USS Makin Island (LHD-8)	7 in service USS Bonhomme Richard (LHD-6) suffered a fire at port and was deemed too far gone, and was sent to scrap.
Amphibious Command Ships (2)
Blue Ridge		USS Blue Ridge (LCC-19); USS Mount Whitney (LCC-20)	2 in service USS Blue Ridge is the oldest deployed ship in the navy.
Amphibious transport docks (13)
San Antonio		USS San Antonio (LPD-17); USS New Orleans (LPD-18); USS Mesa Verde (LPD-19); USS Green Bay (LPD-20); USS New York (LPD-21); USS San Diego (LPD-22); USS Anchorage (LPD-23); USS Arlington (LPD-24); USS Somerset (LPD-25); USS John P. Murtha (LPD-26); USS Portland (LPD-27); USS Fort Lauderdale (LPD-28); USS Richard M. McCool Jr. (LPD-29)	26 planned, 13 in service, 2 under construction
Dock landing ships (9)
Whidbey Island		USS Gunston Hall (LSD-44); USS Comstock (LSD-45); USS Tortuga (LSD-46); USS Rushmore (LSD-47); USS Ashland (LSD-48)	5 In service planned retirement mid-early 2030s
Harpers Ferry		USS Harpers Ferry (LSD-49); USS Carter Hall (LSD-50); USS Oak Hill (LSD-51); USS Pearl Harbor (LSD-52)	4 In service planned retirement mid-late 2030s

=== Cruisers ===
Class	Image	Individual ships	Notes
Cruisers (5)
Ticonderoga		USS Princeton (CG-59); USS Robert Smalls (CG-62); USS Gettysburg (CG-64); USS Chosin (CG-65); USS Cape St. George (CG-71)	5 In service planned retirement early 2030s

=== Destroyers ===
Class	Image	Individual ships	Notes
Destroyers (78)
Arleigh Burke	USS William P. Lawrence in 2015	Flight I USS Arleigh Burke (DDG-51); USS Barry (DDG-52); USS John Paul Jones (DDG-53); USS Curtis Wilbur (DDG-54); USS Stout (DDG-55); USS John S. McCain (DDG-56); USS Mitscher (DDG-57); USS Laboon (DDG-58); USS Russell (DDG-59); USS Paul Hamilton (DDG-60); USS Ramage (DDG-61); USS Fitzgerald (DDG-62); USS Stethem (DDG-63); USS Carney (DDG-64); USS Benfold (DDG-65); USS Gonzalez (DDG-66); USS Cole (DDG-67); USS The Sullivans (DDG-68); USS Milius (DDG-69); USS Hopper (DDG-70); USS Ross (DDG-71); Flight II; USS Mahan (DDG-72); USS Decatur (DDG-73); USS McFaul (DDG-74); USS Donald Cook (DDG-75); USS Higgins (DDG-76); USS O'Kane (DDG-77); USS Porter (DDG-78); Flight IIA; USS Oscar Austin (DDG-79); USS Roosevelt (DDG-80); USS Winston S. Churchill (DDG-81); USS Lassen (DDG-82); USS Howard (DDG-83); USS Bulkeley (DDG-84); USS McCampbell (DDG-85); USS Shoup (DDG-86); USS Mason (DDG-87); USS Preble (DDG-88); USS Mustin (DDG-89); USS Chafee (DDG-90); USS Pinckney (DDG-91); USS Momsen (DDG-92); USS Chung-Hoon (DDG-93); USS Nitze (DDG-94); USS James E. Williams (DDG-95); USS Bainbridge (DDG-96); USS Halsey (DDG-97); USS Forrest Sherman (DDG-98); USS Farragut (DDG-99); USS Kidd (DDG-100); USS Gridley (DDG-101); USS Sampson (DDG-102); USS Truxtun (DDG-103); USS Sterett (DDG-104); USS Dewey (DDG-105); USS Stockdale (DDG-106); USS Gravely (DDG-107); USS Wayne E. Meyer (DDG-108); USS Jason Dunham (DDG-109); USS William P. Lawrence (DDG-110); USS Spruance (DDG-111); USS Michael Murphy (DDG-112); Flight IIA Restart; USS John Finn (DDG-113); USS Ralph Johnson (DDG-114); USS Rafael Peralta (DDG-115); Flight IIA Technology Insertion; USS Thomas Hudner (DDG-116); USS Paul Ignatius (DDG-117); USS Daniel Inouye (DDG-118); USS Delbert D. Black (DDG-119); USS Carl M. Levin (DDG-120); USS Frank E. Petersen Jr. (DDG-121); USS John Basilone (DDG-122); USS Lenah Sutcliffe Higbee (DDG-123); USS Harvey C. Barnum Jr. (DDG-124); Flight III; USS Jack H. Lucas (DDG-125); USS Ted Stevens (DDG-128)	99 planned, 76 in service, 9 under construction: Flight I: 21 in service; Flight II: 7 in service; Flight IIA: 46 in service (12 Technology insertion), 1 under construction; Flight III: 2 in service, 10 under construction, 13 on order.
Zumwalt		USS Zumwalt (DDG-1000); USS Michael Monsoor (DDG-1001); USS Lyndon B. Johnson (DDG-1002)	2 in service, 1 in sea trials (has been since 2019), 29 cancelled

=== Frigates ===
Class	Image	Individual ships	Notes
Constellation		USS Constellation (FFG-62); USS Congress (FFG-63)	2 under construction, 18 cancelled

=== Littoral combat ships / Corvettes ===
Class	Image	Individual ships	Notes
Littoral combat ships (28)
Freedom		USS Fort Worth (LCS-3); USS Wichita (LCS-13); USS Billings (LCS-15); USS Indianapolis (LCS-17); USS St. Louis (LCS-19); USS Minneapolis-Saint Paul (LCS-21); USS Cooperstown (LCS-23); USS Marinette (LCS-25); USS Nantucket (LCS-27); USS Beloit (LCS-29); USS Cleveland (LCS-31)	11 in service, 5 retired early
Independence		USS Jackson (LCS-6); USS Montgomery (LCS-8); USS Gabrielle Giffords (LCS-10); USS Omaha (LCS-12); USS Manchester (LCS-14); USS Tulsa (LCS-16); USS Charleston (LCS-18); USS Cincinnati (LCS-20); USS Kansas City (LCS-22); USS Oakland (LCS-24); USS Mobile (LCS-26); USS Savannah (LCS-28); USS Canberra (LCS-30); USS Santa Barbara (LCS-32); USS Augusta (LCS-34); USS Kingsville (LCS-36); USS Pierre (LCS-38)	17 in service, 2 retired early

=== Expeditionary Transfer Dock ===
The following is a list of the Navy's Expeditionary Transfer Docks:

Class	Image	Individual ships	Notes
Lewis B. Puller		USS Lewis B. Puller (ESB-3); USS Hershel "Woody" Williams (ESB-4); USS Miguel Keith (ESB-5); USS John L. Canley (ESB-6)	4 in service, 1 under construction

=== Mine countermeasure ships ===
Class	Image	Individual ships	Notes
Avenger		USS Patriot (MCM-7); USS Pioneer (MCM-9); USS Warrior (MCM-10); USS Chief (MCM-14)	4 in service US navy only dedicated MCM ships. Only class to have all ships stationed at one home port.

=== Submarine Tender ===
Class	Image	Individual ships	Notes
Emory S. Land		USS Emory S. Land (AS-39); USS Frank Cable (AS-40)	2 in service

=== Technological research ship ===
Class	Image	Individual ships	Notes
Banner		USS Pueblo (AGER-2)	Captured and currently possessed by North Korea

=== Original six frigates ===
Class	Image	Individual ships	Notes
Classic Frigate		USS Constitution	The oldest commissioned vessel in the US Navy

=== Patrol boats ===
Boat	Image	Armament	Notes
Mk VI PB		2x Mk 38 Mod 2 25 mm, 1x Mk 50, BGM-176B Griffin, 6x turret mounts[single, twin], CROWS and turret mounts : [Mk 19 40 mm, GAU-19 .50 in, M2HB .50 in, GSU-17 7.62 mm, M240B 7.62 mm]	Transportable by Lockheed C-5 Galaxy, Wasp-class amphibious assault ship, America-class amphibious assault ship, Watson-class vehicle cargo ship
Mk1 CCM (Combatant Craft Medium)		1x Mk 38 Mod 2 25 mm, M2 Browning .50 cal Heavy Machine Gun and M240 General Purpose Machine Gun	Transportable by Lockheed C-5 Galaxy, Boeing C-17 Globemaster III, Wasp-class amphibious assault ship, America-class amphibious assault ship, Watson-class vehicle cargo ship
Mk 5 SOC		1x Mk 38 Mod 2 25 mm, M2 Browning .50 cal Heavy Machine Gun and M240 General Purpose Machine Gun	Transportable by Lockheed C-5 Galaxy, Boeing C-17 Globemaster III, Wasp-class amphibious assault ship, America-class amphibious assault ship, Watson-class vehicle cargo ship
RCB-90		1x RCWS, 4x turret mounts [single], RCWS and turret mounts : [Mk 19 40 mm, GAU-19 .50 in, M2HB .50 in, GSU-17 7.62 mm, M240B 7.62 mm], 4x naval mines or 6x depth charges	Transportable by Lockheed C-5 Galaxy, Boeing C-17 Globemaster III, Wasp-class amphibious assault ship, America-class amphibious assault ship, Watson-class vehicle cargo ship
SOC-R		GAU-17 minigun, M2 Browning .50 cal Heavy Machine Gun, M240 General Purpose Machine Gun, and 40mm Mk 19 grenade launcher	Transportable by CH-47, C-130, and larger aircraft
RHIB		M2 Browning .50 cal Heavy Machine Gun, M240 General Purpose Machine Gun, and M249 light machine gun	Transportable by almost every carrier

=== Landing craft utility ===
Boat	Image	Armament	Notes
LCU 1627		4x turret mounts[single] : [Mk 19 40 mm, GAU-19 .50 in, M2HB .50 in, GSU-17 7.62 mm, M240B 7.62 mm]	Wasp-class amphibious assault ship, America-class amphibious assault ship, Watson-class vehicle cargo ship
LCU 2000			
LCU 1700		4x turret mounts[single] : [Mk 19 40 mm, GAU-19 .50 in, M2HB .50 in, GSU-17 7.62 mm, M240B 7.62 mm]	Wasp-class amphibious assault ship, America-class amphibious assault ship, Watson-class vehicle cargo ship
LCAC		4x turret mounts[single] : [Mk 19 40 mm, GAU-19 .50 in, M2HB .50 in, GSU-17 7.62 mm, M240B 7.62 mm]	Wasp-class amphibious assault ship, America-class amphibious assault ship, Watson-class vehicle cargo ship

== Aircraft ==
Aircraft	Image	Origin	Type	Variant	In service	Notes
Combat Aircraft (677)
F/A-18 Super Hornet		United States	Multirole	F/A-18E/F	575	17 on order
F-35 Lightning II		United States	Multirole	F-35C	102	117 on order
Electronic Warfare and Signals Intelligence (250)
E-2 Hawkeye		United States	Carrier capable airborne early warning	E-2C/D	74	22 E-2D on order, 10 E-2C to be retired
E-6 Mercury		United States	Airborne command and control	E-6B	16	Being replaced by E-130J
EA-18 Growler		United States	Electronic warfare	EA-18G	160	
Maritime Patrol (124)
P-8 Poseidon		United States	Maritime patrol	P-8A	124	14 on order
Tanker (12)
KC-130 Hercules		United States	Aerial refueling/transport	KC-130T KC-130J	11 1	
Transport (70)
C-2 Greyhound		United States	Carrier based transport	C-2A	7	Planned to be Replaced with V-22 Osprey
C-12 Huron		United States	Transport	UC-12F UC-12M RC-12M	14	
C-20 Grey Ghost		United States	Transport	C-20G	2	
C-26 Metroliner		United States	Transport	C-26D	7	
C-37 Gulfstream		United States	Transport	C-37A C-37B	1 3	
C-38 Courier		Israel	Transport	C-38A	2	
C-40 Clipper		United States	Transport	C-40A	17	
C-130 Hercules		United States	Transport	C-130T	16	
C-130J Super Hercules		United States	Transport	C-130J	1	
Rotorcraft (588)
V-22 Osprey		United States	Carrier based transport	CMV-22B	44	53 Planned, 9 still on order
MH-53 Sea Dragon		United States	Multi-mission helicopter	MH-53E	23	
MH-60 Seahawk		United States	Multi-mission helicopter	MH-60R MH-60S	270 251	
Trainer Aircraft (946)
TH-57 Sea Ranger		United States	Training helicopter	TH-57B TH-57C	92	
UH-72 Lakota		Multinational	Training helicopter	UH-72A	5	
TH-73 Thrasher		Italy / United States	Training helicopter	TH-73A	130	
U-1 Otter		Canada	Trainer	NU-1B	1	Otter NU-1B is the oldest aircraft in the U.S. Navy, in service at the U.S. Naval Test Pilot School, Patuxent River, Md.
U-6 Beaver		Canada	Trainer	U-6A	2	
UV-18 Twin Otter		Canada	Trainer	UV-18A	2	
C-26 Metroliner		United States	Trainer	C-26A	1	Airborne Systems Training and Research Support, 3rd Generation (ASTARS III)
X-26 Frigate		United States	Trainer	X-26A	2	
F-5 Tiger II		United States	Adversary trainer	F-5F F-5N	2 24	
F-16 Fighting Falcon		United States	Adversary trainer	F-16A/B F-16C/D	14 37	
F/A-18 Hornet		United States	Trainer	F/A-18/C/D	19	Operated by reserve, training and development squadrons in a role described as "non-deployable". While the F/A-18C is possessed by the Navy Reserve Strike fighter squadron VFA-204, due to their unsuitability in combat situations in regards to their lack of modern avionics, communications equipment and weapons integration, they are used solely as an adversary/aggressor trainer.
T-6 Texan II		United States	Trainer	T-6A T-6B AT-6E	43 250 2	
T-38 Talon		United States	Supersonic jet trainer	T-38C	10	
T-44 Pegasus		United States	Multi-engine trainer	T-44C	54	
T-54 Marlin II		United States	Multi-engine trainer	T-54A	63	
T-45 Goshawk		United Kingdom / United States	Carrier based trainer	T-45C	193	
Unmanned Aerial Systems (42)
MQ-4C Triton		United States	Surveillance & patrol aircraft	MQ-4C	22	
MQ-8C Fire Scout		United States	UAV helicopter	MQ-8C	19	
Boeing MQ-25 Stingray		United States	UAV Aerial refueling	MQ-25 T1	1	72 planned

== Munitions ==
Name	Image	Type	Versions	Name	Image	Type	Versions
MK84		General-purpose bomb		AIM-7		Medium-range, semi-active radar homing air-to-air missile	AIM-7A, AIM-7B, AIM-7C, AIM-7D, AIM-7E, AIM-7E2, AIM-7F, AIM-7M, AIM-7P, and RIM-7M
CBU-78		Air-dropped anti-tank and anti-personnel mines	CBU-78/B	AIM-9		Short-range air-to-air missile	AIM-9D, AIM-9G, AIM-9H, AIM-9L, AIM-9M, AIM-9R, and AIM-9X
MK83		General-purpose bomb	BLU-110	AIM-120		Medium-range, active radar homing air-to-air missile	AIM-120A, AIM-120B, AIM-120C, AIM-120C-4/5/6/7, AIM-120D
CBU-100		Cluster bomb		MK82		General-purpose bomb	BLU-111/B, BLU-111A/B, BLU-126/B
AGM-65		Guided air-to-surface missile	AGM-65A/B, AGM-65D, AGM-65E, AGM-65F/G, AGM-65H, AGM-65J, and AGM-65K	AGM-84		Anti-ship missile	AGM-84, RGM-84, and UGM-84
AGM-88		Air-to-surface anti-radiation missile	AGM-88E AARGM	AGM-154		Glide bomb	AGM-154A, AGM-154B, AGM-154C
AGM-114		Guided air-to-surface missile	AGM-114B, AGM-114K, AGM-114M	BGM-109		cruise missile	BGM-109C, BGM-109D, RGM-109E, UGM-109E
RIM-116		Close-in weapons system	RIM-116A, RIM-116B	UGM-133		SLBM	UGM-133 Trident II
RIM-162		Surface-to-air missile	RIM-162 ESSM	RIM-66		Surface-to-air missile	RIM-66K, RIM-66L, RIM-66M
RIM-174A Standard ERAM		Surface-to-air missile	RIM-174A Block IA, RIM-174A Block IB	RIM-161		Anti-ballistic missile	RIM-161C
GBU-10		Prescision-Guided		BLU-109		Bunker Buster	
GBU-12		Prescision-Guided		BLU-110		General-purpose bomb	
GBU-16		Prescision-Guided		BLU-111		General-purpose bomb	
GBU-24		Prescision-Guided		GBU-31		Prescision-Guided	
GBU-32		Prescision-Guided		GBU-38		Prescision-Guided	
GBU-51		Prescision-Guided		GBU-39		Prescision-Guided	
GBU-53		Prescision-Guided		GBU-49		Prescision-Guided	
GBU-54		Prescision-Guided		GBU-61		Countermine System	
MK62		Navy Mines		MK63		Navy Mines	
MK65		Navy Mines		MK67		Submarine Launch Mines	
Mark 48		Torpedo		Mark 54		Torpedo	

== Land vehicles ==
In addition to the vehicles listed here, the Navy Seabees operate a number of unlisted trucks and construction vehicles.

Name	Image	Type	Notes
M939		Utility vehicle	Used primarily by Expeditionary Forces
FMTV		Utility vehicle	Used primarily by Expeditionary Forces
MTVR		6x6 tactical truck	Used by Navy Seabees
HMMWV		Light utility vehicle	Used primarily by Expeditionary Forces. To be replaced by M-ATV and JLTV.
Oshkosh M-ATV		MRAP, LUV	To replace HMMWV, used by Navy Special Warfare and Explosive Ordnance Disposal (EOD) teams.
Oshkosh JLTV		light multi-role vehicle/light tactical vehicle and MRAP	To replace HMMWV, used by Navy Special Warfare teams
Buffalo		MRAP	Used by Explosive Ordnance Disposal (EOD) and Navy Seabees
Cougar		MRAP and IFV	H (4x4) / HE (6x6) variants both used by Explosive Ordnance Disposal (EOD) and Navy Seabees
LARC-V		amphibious vehicle	Used by amphibious naval beach units
DPV		Patrol vehicle	to be replaced by ALSV
ALSV		Special Attack Vehicle	Replacing DPV
IFAV		LUV	
LSSV		Multi-purpose vehicle	Used by Navy Special Warfare teams for various missions

== Small arms ==
Model	Image	Caliber	Type	Origin	Details
Pistols
M17		9×19mm Parabellum	Pistol	United States	Standard service pistol.
M9		9×19mm Parabellum	Pistol	Italy	Former standardservice pistol being replaced by the M17.
P226		9×19mm Parabellum	Pistol	Switzerland	P226, P226R, P228, P229 (M11 Mod 0), P229R-DAK and Mk 25. Used by Naval Special Operations.
Mk 23 Mod 0		.45 ACP	Pistol	Germany	Used by Naval Special Warfare.
M1911		.45 ACP	Pistol	United States	Limited service.
G19		9x19mm Parabellum	Pistol	Austria	Adopted by Naval Special Warfare in 2016 as the Mk 27. Slowly replacing the Mk 25.
HK45		.45 ACP	Pistol	Germany	HK 45 Compact Tactical V3; Adopted by Naval Special Warfare designated the Mk 24.
Submachine guns
MP5		9×19mm Parabellum	Submachine gun	Germany	MP5, MP5K, MP5N, MP5SD, may be replaced by lighter and cheaper Universal Machine Pistol.
MP7		HK 4.6×30mm	Submachine gun, Personal defense weapon	Germany	Used by JSOC units.
Assault rifles, Battle rifles
M16		5.56×45mm NATO	Assault rifle	United States	Phased out in favor of the M4/M4A1.
M4/M4A1		5.56×45mm NATO	Assault rifle, Carbine	United States	Standard service rifle.
HK416		5.56×45mm NATO	Assault rifle	Germany	D10RS variant with a 10.4-inch barrel. Used by Naval Special Warfare and JSOC.
HK417		7.62×51mm NATO	Battle rifle	Germany	Adopted as a battle rifle and marksman rifle by Naval Special Warfare and JSOC units.
Mk 16 Mod 0 + MK17 Mod 0		5.56×45mm NATO 7.62×51mm NATO	Assault rifle (SCAR L), Battle Rifle (SCAR H)	Belgium; United States	Used by all branches of USSOCOM.
M14		7.62×51mm NATO	Battle rifle	United States	Limited service.
Designated marksman rifles (DMR) and sniper rifles
Mk 11 Mod 0		7.62×51mm NATO	Sniper rifle, Designated marksman rifle	United States	Used by Naval Special Warfare.
Mk 12 SPR		5.56×45mm NATO	Designated marksman rifle	United States	Used by all branches of USSOCOM.
Mk 13 Mod 5		.300 Winchester Magnum	Sniper rifle	United States	Used by Naval Special Warfare.
McMillan Tac-338		.338 Lapua Magnum	Sniper rifle, anti-materiel	United States	Bolt-action sniper rifle used by Naval Special Warfare.
Mk 15		.50 BMG	Anti materiel sniper rifle	United States	Bolt-action anti-material rifle used by Naval Special Warfare.
Barrett 50 cal/M82/M107		.50 BMG	Anti materiel sniper rifle	United States	Semi-automatic
Shotguns
500 MILS		12-gauge	Shotgun	United States	Pump-action
M1014		12-gauge	Shotgun	Italy	Semi-automatic
M870		12-gauge	Shotgun	United States	Pump-action
Machine guns
M249		5.56×45mm NATO	Light machine gun, Squad automatic weapon	United States	Belt-fed but can be used with STANAG magazines.
Mk 48		7.62×51mm NATO	General purpose light machine gun	Belgium; United States	Belt-fed.
M240		7.62×51mm NATO	General purpose medium machine gun	Belgium; United States	Belt-fed.
M60		7.62×51mm NATO	General purpose medium machine gun	United States	Belt-fed, current models: E4 (Mk 43 mod 0/1) and E6.
Browning M2HB		.50 BMG	Heavy machine gun	United States	Mounted on vehicles or tripods.
Grenade-based weapons
Mk 19		40mm	Automatic grenade launcher	United States	Belt-fed.
Mk 47 Striker		40mm	Automatic grenade launcher	United States	Fire-control system.
M203		40mm	Grenade launcher	United States	Single-shot underbarrel grenade launcher.
M320		40mm	Single shot Grenade launcher	Germany; United States	Single-shot underbarrel or stand-alone grenade launcher.
Mk 14		40mm	Grenade launcher	South Africa	Six-shot revolver-type grenade launcher.
M67 frag			Frag hand grenade	United States	4-5.5 second fuse timer.
M18			Smoke grenade	United States	Used for signaling with aerial assets and concealment.
Portable anti-materiel weapons
AT4		84mm	Anti-tank weapon	Sweden	
M3 MAAWS		84x246mm R	Anti-tank recoilless rifle	Sweden	
FGM-148 Javelin		127mm	Fire-and-forget anti-tank missile	United States	
FIM-92 Stinger		70mm	S.A.M.	United States	
Gatling guns
Mk 25 Mod 0 Minigun		7.62x51mm NATO	six-barrel Gatling gun	United States	

== Individual equipment ==
Model	Image	Type	Variants	Details
Uniform equipment
NWU combat uniform		battledress	Type III (woodland), Type II (desert), and Type I (canceled)	standard issue Naval issue combat uniform
MARPAT		Camouflage pattern	Desert, Woodland, Winter, Urban (prototype)	Limited-issue for certain positions
Advanced Bomb Suit		bomb suit		Used by Explosive Ordnance Disposal teams
Interceptor Body Armor		ballistic vest	U.S. Woodland, Coyote Tan, Desert camouflage or "Chocolate Chip" uniform, and Universal Camouflage Pattern	May be replaced by Combat Integrated Releasable Armor System or various ballistic vests like the Improved Modular Tactical Vest and Improved Scalable Plate Carrier used by the U.S. Marine Corps
Combat Integrated Releasable Armor System		modular ballistic vest		Replaces the Full Spectrum Battle Equipment Amphibious Assault Vest
Enhanced Combat Helmet		Combat helmet		Replaces Advanced Combat Helmet and Lightweight Helmet

== See also ==
- Equipment of the United States Armed Forces
- Equipment of the United States Air Force
- Equipment of the United States Army
- Equipment of the United States Coast Guard
- Equipment of the United States Marine Corps
  - List of weapons of the United States Marine Corps
- List of active United States military aircraft
- List of military electronics of the United States
