= AMMAD =

Israeli anti-mine system

AMMAD Anti-Magnetic Mine Actuating Device is an anti-mine system manufactured by Israel Aerospace Industries that safely neutralizes (triggers) magnetically-fused land mines before a vehicle passes over the threat. It works by generating a magnetic field that precedes the vehicle at a safe standoff range (5 ft. to 16 ft. in front of the vehicle).

== See also ==
- Countermine System
