= List of equipment of the United States Army =

The United States Army uses various equipment in the course of their work.

== Small arms ==
=== Firearms ===
Model	Image	Caliber	Type	Origin	Details
Pistols
SIG Sauer M17		9×19mm NATO	Pistol	United States	SIG Sauer P320 – US Army Standard Issue Sidearm. Winner of the Modular Handgun System competition. Replaced all M9 and M11 pistols in service.
Glock 19		9×19mm NATO	Pistol	Austria	Glock 19 – widespread use in special operations forces/ replacing multiple pistol options
Glock 17		9×19mm NATO	Pistol	Austria	Glock 17 – limited use by special operations forces
Submachine guns
B&T APC9 Pro-K		9×19mm NATO	Submachine gun	Switzerland	Used in Military Police and Security Details as Sub Compact Weapon (SCW); As of 2019 the United States has adopted a small number for use.
SIG Sauer MPX		9×19mm NATO	Submachine gun	United States	Used in night operations, close quarters, hostage rescue, and escort
Assault rifles
M7		6.8×51mm	Assault rifle	United States	Future standard service rifle, replacing the M4A1 for close combat forces. Winner of the NGSW program in April 2022.
XM8		6.8×51mm	Assault rifle	United States	Carbine Version of M7
M4A1		5.56×45mm NATO	Carbine	United States	Standard service rifle. To be partially replaced by the M7, winner of the Next Generation Squad Weapon Program
M16		5.56×45mm NATO	Assault rifle	United States	Former standard service rifle. Stockpiled in reserve (M16, M16A2) however M16A4 versions are still in use, gradually being replaced.
Mk 17 Mod 0		7.62×51mm NATO	Battle rifle	Belgium; United States	Used by US Army Rangers, US Army Special Forces, and Delta Force
HK416		5.56×45mm NATO	Assault rifle	Germany	Used by Delta Force
SIG Sauer MCX		5.56×45mm NATO, .300 AAC Blackout	Assault rifle	United States	Used by special operations forces in four primary variants: LVAW, CSAW, RSAR, and SURG.
Shotguns
M26 MASS		12-gauge	Underbarrel shotgun	United States	In use
M590		12-gauge	Pump action shotgun	United States	In use
Benelli M4		12-gauge	Semi-automatic shotgun	Italy; United States	In use
Machine guns
M250		6.8×51mm	Light machine gun	United States	Future light machine gun, winner of the NGSW program in April 2022.
M249		5.56×45mm NATO	Squad automatic weapon	Belgium; United States	Belt-fed, but can be used with STANAG magazines. To be replaced by the M250, winner of the Next Generation Squad Weapon Program
M240		7.62×51mm NATO	General purpose machine gun	Belgium; United States	Belt-fed
M2A1		12.7×99mm NATO (.50 BMG)	Heavy machine gun	United States	Mounted on vehicles or tripods
Designated marksman rifles and sniper rifles
M110 SASS		7.62×51mm NATO, 6.5mm Creedmoor	Semi-automatic Sniper rifle	United States	Based on: KAC SR-25
M110A1 SDMR /CSASS		7.62×51mm NATO	Designated marksman rifle	Germany	Based on: HK G28 Variants: M110A1 CSASS (M110 SASS replacement); M110A1 SDMR (MK14 EBR replacement)
M2010 ESR		.300 Winchester Magnum	Sniper rifle	United States	Based on: M24
Mk 13		.300 Winchester Magnum	Sniper rifle	United Kingdom	Based on: Remington 700 (AICS 2.0 chassis)
Mk 20 SSR		7.62×51mm NATO, 6.5mm Creedmoor	Designated marksman rifle	Belgium; United States	Based on: FN SCAR-H TPR
Mk 21 PSR		7.62×51mm NATO, .300 Winchester Magnum, .338 Lapua Magnum	Sniper rifle	United States	Based on: Remington MSR
Mk 22 ASR / PSR		7.62×51mm NATO, .300 Norma Magnum, .338 Norma Magnum	Sniper rifle	United States	Based on: Barrett MRAD
M82 / M107 LRSR		12.7×99mm NATO	Semi-automatic Anti-materiel sniper rifle	United States	

=== Explosives ===
Model	Image	Caliber	Type	Origin	Details
Grenade-based weapons
Mk 19		40mm	Automatic grenade launcher	United States	Belt-fed.
Mk 47 Striker		40mm	Automatic grenade launcher	United States	Equipped with fire-control system
M203		40mm	Grenade launcher	United States	Single-shot underbarrel grenade launcher
MK 13 EGLM		40mm	Grenade launcher	Belgium; United States	Single-shot underbarrel or stand-alone grenade launcher, notably compatible with the MK 17
M320		40mm	Grenade launcher	Germany; United States	Single-shot underbarrel or stand-alone grenade launcher, notably compatible with the HK416
M67			Fragmentation grenade	United States	U.S. Army fragmentation hand grenade: spherical “baseball” design with a ~4‑second delay fuze, produces lethal fragments at short range (lethal radius ~5 m, casualty/effective radius ≈15 m); used for anti‑personnel suppression and clearing; weight ≈430 g (≈14 oz).
M111 offensive hand grenade			Offensive Grenade	United States	The M111 Offensive Grenade is the designated replacement for the Mk3A2 and provides the same performance envelope. It generates shock waves (overpressure) greater than those of a fragmentation grenade, making it more effective against enemy personnel in bunkers, buildings, and other fortified positions.
Scalable Offensive Hand Grenade			Modular fragmentation grenade	United States	The Army awarded a contract for 76,935 of the scalable grenades in 2023.
M18			Smoke grenade	United States	Hand-thrown colored smoke grenade for signaling and short-duration visual obscuration.
M84			Flashbang	United States	Hand‑thrown stun grenade that produces a very intense, short flash and a high‑decibel concussive blast (roughly 170–180 dB), temporarily disorienting sight and hearing for entry, breaching, and close‑quarters operations; non‑lethal when used properly but can cause serious injury or hearing loss if misused.
Portable anti-materiel weapons
M136 AT4		84mm	Anti-tank weapon	Sweden	Variants: M136 AT4; M136A1 AT4CS-RS
M141		83.5mm	Anti-fortification	United States	Single-shot shoulder-launched weapon designed to defeat hardened structures. Based on the SMAW.
M72 LAW		66mm	Anti-tank weapon	United States	U.S. 66 mm disposable anti-tank rocket launcher introduced in 1963.
M3 MAAWS		84x246mm R	Anti-tank recoilless rifle	Sweden	Variants: M3 MAAWS; M3A1 MAAWS
BGM-71 TOW		152mm	Wire-guided anti-tank missile	United States	
FGM-148 Javelin		127mm	Fire-and-forget anti-tank missile	United States	
FIM-92 Stinger		70mm	Anti-aircraft missile	United States	533+

== Artillery ==
Model	Image	Caliber	Type	Origin	Numbers	Notes
Self-Propelled Artillery (370)
M109A6 Paladin		155 mmL/39	Self-propelled howitzer	United States	370	
M109A7		155 mmL/39	Self-propelled howitzer	United States	300	689 more on order.
M992A3		155 mm	Field artillery ammunition supply vehicle	United States	Unknown	
Towed Artillery (1,878)
M119		105 mmL/30.5	Towed howitzer	United Kingdom; United States	821	M119A2/3.
M777		155 mmL/39	Towed howitzer	United Kingdom; United States	1,000	M777A2.
Rocket Artillery and Missile (1,531)
M142 HIMARS		227 mm 610 mm 240 mm (future) 430 mm (future)	Multiple launch rocket system	United States	368	M270 pod mounted on a standard Army Medium Tactical Vehicle (MTV) truck frame.
M270		227 mm 240 mm 610 mm 430 mm (future)	Multiple launch rocket system	United States	991	M270A1/A2. Armored, self-propelled, multiple rocket launcher.
LRHW (Long-Range Hypersonic Weapon)		Not clear	hypersonic glide vehicle	United States	Not clear	hypersonic glide vehicle
Typhon missile system		Not clear	Transporter erector launcher	United States	Not clear	Transporter erector launcher
Mortars (2,507 active)
Cardom		81 mm/120 mm	Recoil mortar system, mortar carrier	Israel; United States	441 (345 M1129, 96 M1252)	Mounted on Stryker: M1129 MCV-B; M1252 MCVV (variant with double V-hull)
M1287 mortar carrier vehicle		120 mm	Mortar carrier	Israel; United States	386 planned	System mounted on AMPV, replacing the M1064, 69 rounds in storage
XM905 advanced mortar protection system		120 mm	Mortar turret module	United States	Unknown	Used at forward operating bases in Syria
M224		60 mm	Dismounted mortar	United States	Unknown	
M252		81 mm	Dismounted mortar	United Kingdom	990	
M120		120 mm	Dismounted mortar / mortar carrier	Israel	1,076	Includes the M1064, 81 mm equipped
Air defense systems (1,187+ active)
Centurion		20×102 mm	C-RAM with rotary cannon system	United States	Unknown	Trailer-mounted version of the Phalanx CIWS
AN/TWQ-1		70 mm	Self-propelled SHORAD	United States	453	System mounted on HMMWV
M-SHORAD		180 mm 70 mm 30×113 mm, 7.62×51 mm NATO	Self-propelled SHORAD	United States; Italy	144 planned in 2018; 80 estimated active in 2023	System mounted on Stryker A1, system made by Leonardo DRS. Reconfigurable Integrated-weapons Platform (RIwP) equipped with: FIM-92 Stinger pod; AGM-114 Hellfire pod; M230LF chain gun; M240 coaxial machine gun
MIM-104		410 mm	Mobile, long-range surface-to-air missile with anti-ballistic missile capability	United States	55 in active and 5 in reserve 60 in total	
THAAD		340 mm / 370 mm	Mobile, long-range anti-ballistic missile	United States	7 in active and 1 reserve	

== Vehicles ==
Name	Image	Origin	Type	Caliber	Quantity	Details
Tanks (2,720)
M1 Abrams		United States	Main battle tank	120 mm	2,640 operational	2000 M1A1/A2 in storage
M10 Booker		United States	Armored infantry support vehicle	105 mm	26	Canceled in May 2025 (some tanks under production)
Infantry Fighting Vehicles(7,724)
M1126 Stryker		CanadaUnited States	Armored personnel carrier –infantry fighting vehicle hybrid		4383 total across all variants, of which 169 donated to Ukraine, 4214 remain in service (see details)	545 M1127 Stryker RV; 83 M1296 Stryker Dragoon; 7 Stryker MCWS in testing; 1,218 M1126 Stryker ICV; 465 M1256A1 Stryker ICV; 261 M1130 Stryker CV; 87 M1255A1 Stryker CV; 151 M1131 Stryker FSV; 37 M1251A1 Stryker FSV; 203 M1133 Stryker MEV; 101 M1254A1 Stryker MEV; 136 M1132 Stryker ESV; 32 M1257A1 Stryker ESV; 234 M1135 Stryker NBCRV; 110 M1134 Stryker ATGM; 23 M1253A1 Stryker ATGM; 345 M1129 Stryker MC; 96 M1252A1 Stryker MC; 80 M-SHORAD estimated; 169 donated to Ukraine
M2 Bradley		United States	Infantry fighting vehicle	25 mm/152 mm	2,100 M2A2/A3 and 210 M2A4 estimated active; 2,000 M2 estimated in storage	
M3 Bradley		United States	Reconnaissance infantry fighting vehicle	25 mm/152 mm	1,200 M3A2/A3 estimated active; 800 M3 estimated in storage	
Armoured Personnel Carriers(6,863)
Armored Ground Mobility System		Austria	Armored Ground Mobility System		50	Used by Delta Force Purchased for the US Army (50, produced by AV Technology as the Armored Ground Mobility System for USASOC Special Forces/Special Operations Forces units)
Armored Multi-Purpose Vehicle		United Kingdom; United States	Armored personnel carrier		276	2907 planned in all variants: 522 M1283 General Purpose; 790 M1284 Medical Evacuation; 216 M1285 Medical Treatment; 993 M1286 Mission Command; 386 M1287 Mortar Carrier
M113		United States	Armored personnel carrier		4,700	8,000 more in store
M1117		United States	Armored personnel carrier		1,837	
M1200 Armored Knight		United States	Artillery Support	M2HB or M240	465+	Used as an Armored Forward Artillery Direction Support Vehicle.
Mine Resistant Ambush Protected Vehicles(12,137)
International MaxxPro		United States	Mine resistant ambush protected vehicle		2,934	
M-ATV		United States	Mine resistant ambush protected vehicle		5,651	
Buffalo		United States	Mine resistant ambush protected vehicle		650	As of 2021.
Cougar		United States	Mine resistant ambush protected vehicle			As of 2023.
RG-31		South Africa	Mine resistant ambush protected vehicle		516 operated by the Army as of 2015.	1,679 under MRAP procurement and 570 ONS Army; at least 894 Mk5E are required for conversion into MMPV Type II by the Army Still used as of 2024.
RG-33		South Africa	Mine resistant ambush protected vehicle		2,386 (all services)	712 will be retained by the Army as MMPV Type 1.
Light vehicles(138,209)
High Mobility Multipurpose Wheeled Vehicle		United States	Light utility vehicle		~125,000	Around 40% of those remaining in service are armored; the armored HMMWVs in service are to be replaced by the JLTV.
Joint Light Tactical Vehicle		United States	Light utility vehicle		12,500 estimated	Will partially replace the Humvee. Oshkosh Defense was awarded the JLTV contract in 2015 for up to 16,901 JLTVs. The procurement objective is 49,099 for the U.S. Army
M1288 GMV 1.1		United States	Light utility vehicle			Replaces the Humvee-based Ground Mobility Vehicle in USSOCOM
M1297 Army Ground Mobility Vehicle		United States	Light utility vehicle			
M1301 Infantry Squad Vehicle		United States	Light utility vehicle		As of November 2025: 919 for U.S. Army IBCTs (delivered); 186 for the 75th Ranger Regiment (delivered); 9,282 (Planned)	Based on Chevrolet Colorado ZR2 platform. Designed to provide greater mobility to Infantry Brigade Combat Teams.
Ranger Special Operations Vehicle		United Kingdom	Light utility vehicle		60 (delivered)	
Logistics Vehicles(164,879)
Family of Medium Tactical Vehicles		United States	Military truck		108,800 (Active in all services)	Oshkosh Defense – >23,400 trucks/>11,400 trailers (current manufacturer). 74,000 trucks and trailers by legacy manufacturers. Figures include the National Guard and Air Force.
Heavy Expanded Mobility Tactical Truck		United States	Military truck		>27,000 (new build and remanufactured)	Figures include National Guard and Air Force
M1070 Heavy Equipment Transporter		United States	Military truck		4,079 (delivered; not all remain in service)	2,488 M1070A0 tractors and >2,600 M1000 trailers delivered of which at least 1,009 tractors and >1000 trailers have been Reset. 1,591 M1070A1 delivered. Figures include the National Guard and Air Force.
M939 series 5-ton 6×6 truck		United States	Military truck		25,000	Intention is to replace with the Oshkosh FMTV. Figures include the National Guard and Air Force.
Palletized Load System		United States	Military truck			
Small Unit Support Vehicle		SwedenUK	All-terrain vehicle			Entered service in 2022. 110 to be procured.
Cold Weather All-Terrain Vehicles		Sweden	All-terrain vehicle			
Engineering Vehicles(2,972)
M88 Hercules		United States	Armored recovery vehicle		933 M88A2 and 360 M88A1 active; 1,000 M88A1 in storage	
M9 Armored Combat Earthmover		United States	Combat engineering vehicle		250	
D9		United States / Israel	Armored bulldozer			
JCB HMEE		United States / United Kingdom	Armored Backhoe loader		>900	
M60 Armoured Vehicle Launched Bridge		United States	Armored vehicle-launched bridge		230 estimated	
M104 Wolverine		United States	Armored vehicle-launched bridge		40	
M1074 Joint Assault Bridge System		United States	Armored vehicle-launched bridge		104	
M1150 Assault Breacher Vehicle		United States	Mine-clearing vehicle		149	
Aardvark JSFU		United Kingdom	Mine-clearing vehicle		3+	
Husky VMMD		South Africa	Mine-clearing vehicle		Unknown	
Hydrema MCV 910		Denmark	Mine-clearing vehicle		3+	
M58 Mine Clearing Line Charge		United States	Mine-clearing vehicle		Unknown	

=== Vehicle-mounted weapons ===
- The M249 SAW, M240, MK 19, and M2 machine guns can be mounted on vehicles.
- BGM-71 TOW mounted on Humvee and JLTV variants, as well as M2 and M3 Bradley
- The M134 Minigun fires 7.62mm ammunition at 3,000 to 4,000 rpm.
- The M3P Machine Gun, an M2 variant with a higher rate of fire mounted on the Avenger Humvee.
- The GAU-19, a rotary gun that fires .50 caliber ammunition. Mounted on Humvees and helicopters.
- The M230 Autocannon fires 30×113mm ammunition at 625 rounds per minute. It is mounted on the AH-64 Apache and UH-60 Black Hawk Direct Action Penetrator helicopters.
- The M242 Autocannon fires 25×137mm ammunition at 200 rounds per minute. It is one of the primary armaments of the Bradley Fighting Vehicle and is one of a variety of anti-air and anti-surface naval armaments.

== Aircraft ==
The U.S. Army operates some fixed-wing aircraft and many helicopters.

Aircraft	Photo	Origin	Role	Introduced	Version	Quantity	Note
Fixed-wing aircraft
C-12 Huron		United States	Cargo/Transport	1972	C-12 C-12J	98	
C-20 Gulfstream		United States	Cargo/Transport	1992	C-20H	1	
Gulfstream C-37		United States	Cargo/Transport	1997	C-37A	1	
C-26 Metroliner		United States	Cargo/Transport	1980s	C-26E	12	
C-27J Spartan		Italy	Cargo/Transport	2008	C-27J	7	
C-41A		Spain	Cargo/Transport	2002	C-41A	5	
EO-5		Canada	Reconnaissance	1975	EO-5C	3	Previously designated as RC-7B
G 120TP		Germany	trainer			6	
RO-6		Canada	Reconnaissance	2020	RO-6A	11	
Cessna UC-35		United States	Utility aircraft	1987	UC-35A UC-35B	28	
Helicopters
AH-6 Little Bird		United States	Attack helicopter	1980	MH/AH-6M	47	74 on order
AH-64 Apache		United States	Attack helicopter	1986	AH-64D AH-64E	91 700	AH64A variants now retired and 812 total apaches is Planned
CH-47 Chinook		United States	Cargo helicopter	1962	CH-47F Block I CH-47F Block II	465 3	465 CH-47F Block II Planned
EH-60 Black Hawk		United States	Electronic-warfare helicopter	1979	EH-60A	64	
MH-47 Chinook		United States	Multi-mission helicopter	1962	MH-47G	36	Orders for 69 Mh-47G Block II
UH-60 Black Hawk		United States	Utility helicopter	1979	UH-60V UH-60M	760 1,375	2,135 planned
UH-72 Lakota		United States; European Union	Utility helicopter	2007	UH-72A	470	38 on order 87 used for training.
Unmanned aerial vehicles (UAVs)
AeroVironment Switchblade		United States	Loitering munition	2012		4400+	†
RQ-11B Raven		United States	Hand-launched UAV	2003		5000	†
Prioria Robotics Maveric		United States	Hand-launched UAV			36	
RQ-20A Puma		United States	Hand-launched UAV	2007		325	†
RQ-7 Shadow		United States		2002	RQ-7B	500	
MQ-1C Gray Eagle		United States	Extended-Range Multi-Purpose UAV	2009		180 estimated	
CQ-10 SnowGoose		Canada				28	
XPV-1 Tern		United States				15	
XPV-2 Mako		United States				14	

- † (numbers as per individual articles)

=== Number of aircraft ===
As of September 4, 2025, the Army has;

- 255 – Fixed-wing/STOL aircraft +
- 4,011 – Rotary-wing/helicopters =
- 4,266 – Total crewed aircraft +
- 9,998 – UAVs/UCAVs/drones =
- 14,264 – Grand total of aircraft

== Vessels ==
The Army also operates several vessel classes.

Class	Image	Type	Quantity	Notes
General Frank S. Besson Class		Logistics support vessel	8	The MSV (Heavy) is expected to replace the LSV, whose planned useful life will end between 2028–2038 for most vessels.
LCM-8		Landing craft	9	Being replaced by the Maneuver Support Vessel (Light)
Maneuver Support Vessel (Light)		Landing craft	1	Replacing the LCM-8
Runnymede Class		Landing craft utility	17	
Dorchester Heights-class small tug		Small tug	6	
Modular Causeway System			30	

== Uniforms ==
Current attire
Name	Pattern name(s)	Pattern/Color	Image	Notes
"Class A" Green Service Uniform		olive drab, light drab, tan		
Army Blue Service Uniform		Blue		
Army Combat Uniform (ACU)	Operational Camouflage Pattern			The OCP uniform was originally codenamed Scorpion W2 in the early 2000s. In response to soldiers' complaints about the ineffectiveness of the Universal Camouflage Pattern that had been in service for the past decade, the army conducted a program between uniform manufacturers in 2015 to find a replacement. The OCP pattern was declared the winner, began to be rolled out in June 2015, and became mandatory in September 2019.
Army Combat Shirt (ACS)	Operational Camouflage Pattern			
Army Aircrew Combat Uniform (A2CU)	Operational Camouflage Pattern			A2CU replaces the Improved Aviation Battle Dress Uniform.
ECWCS (Extended Cold Weather Clothing System / Extended Climate Warfighter Clothing System)	Operational Camouflage Pattern			
Physical Fitness Uniform				

== Body armor ==
Helmets
Name	Pattern name(s)	Pattern	Image	Notes
ACH (Advanced Combat Helmet)				
MICH (Modular Integrated Communications Helmet)				
ECH (Enhanced Combat Helmet)				
FAST (Future Assault Shell Technology)				
IHPS (Integrated Head Protection System)				To replace ACH, MICH and ECH helmets.

Body Armor
Name	Pattern name(s)	Pattern	Image	Notes
Ballistic Combat Shirt				
IBA/OTV (Interceptor Body Armor / Outer Tactical Vest)				
IOTV (Improved Outer Tactical Vest)				
MBAV (Modular Body Armor Vest)				
SPCS (Soldier Plate Carrier System)				
MSV (Modular Scalable Vest)				To replace all other body armor in service.

== Field equipment ==
=== Modular sleep system ===
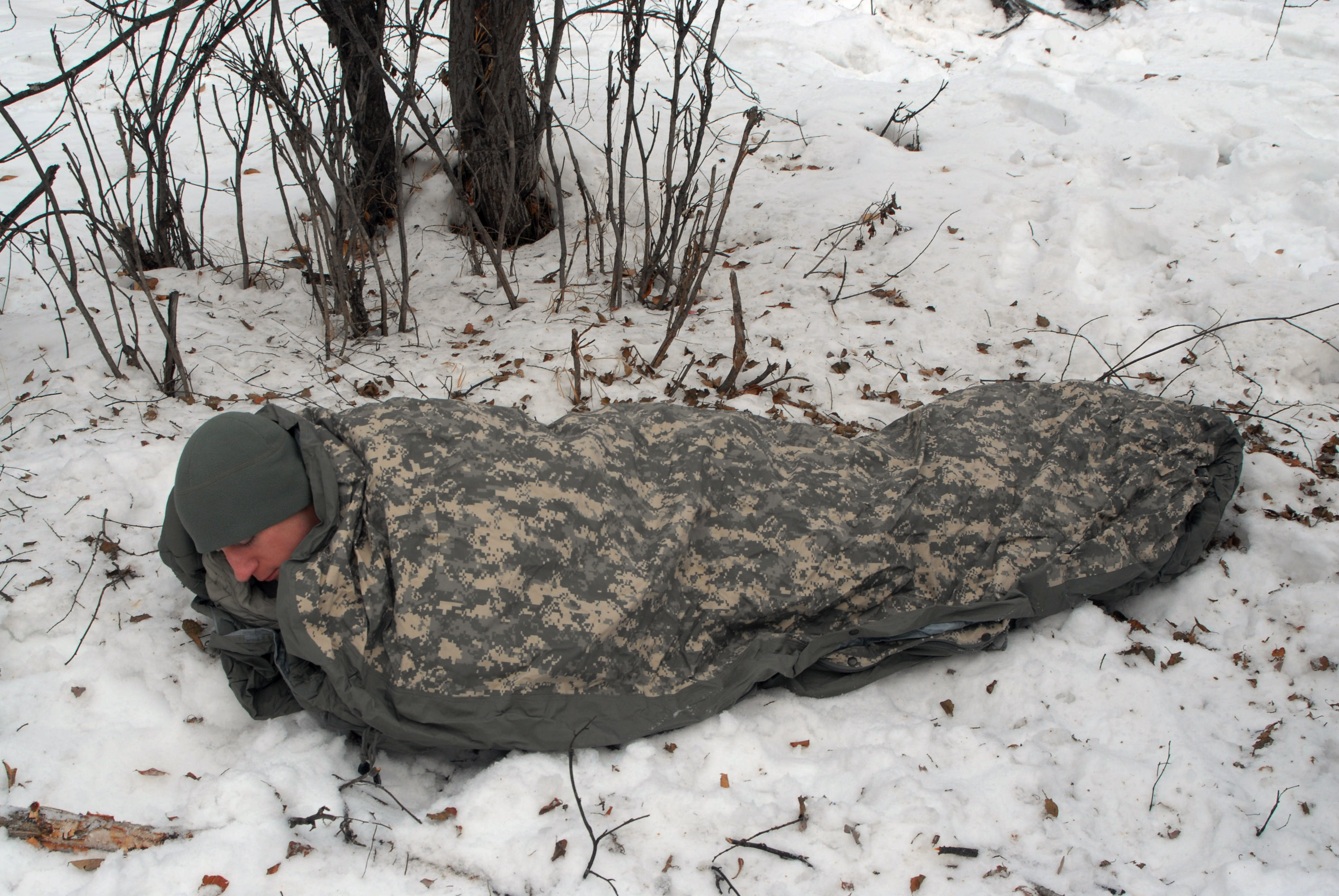
A Modular Sleep System in use

The Modular Sleep System (MSS) is a sleeping bag kit part of the Extended Cold Weather Clothing System (Gen I to Gen III) used by the United States Army and manufactured by Tennier Industries. It consists of a camouflaged, waterproof, breathable bivy cover, a lightweight patrol sleeping bag, and an intermediate cold-weather sleeping bag (note that the color differs depending on the vintage of the gear). Compression sacks are included to store and carry the system. The MSS is available in a variety of camouflage patterns. The patrol bag provides weather protection from 35–50 °F (2–10 °C). The intermediate bag provides cold weather protection from −5–35 °F (−21–2 °C). Combining the patrol bag and intermediate bags provides extreme cold weather protection in temperatures as low as −30 °F (−34 °C). The bivy cover can be used with each of three MSS configurations (patrol, intermediate, or combined) to provide environmental protection from wind and water. The sleeping bags are made of ripstop nylon fabrics and continuous-filament polyester insulation; the camouflage bivy cover is made with waterproof, breathable, coated, or laminated nylon fabric; the compression sacks are made with water-resistant and durable nylon fabrics.

== 3D printing ==
In November 2012, the U.S. Army developed a tactical 3D printing capability to manufacture critical components on the battlefield rapidly. Additive manufacturing is now a capability at Rock Island Arsenal where parts can now be manufactured outside a factory including:

- M1A1 Abrams tank turret
- 40 mm grenade launcher

== Future acquisitions ==
The U.S. Army has announced plans to replace numerous weapons in its arsenal, such as the M4 Carbine and M2 Bradley IFV.

Future Acquisitions
Small Arms
Name	Image	Type	Origin	Notes
Next Generation Squad Weapon		Assault Rifle, Support Weapon	United States	The Next Generation Squad Weapon Program is a United States military program created to replace the M4, M249, and 5.56mm round, as well as provide new digital rifle optics.
Personal Equipment
Integrated Visual Augmentation System		Augmented Reality Headset, Personal Equipment	United States	The Integrated Visual Augmentation System is a military development of the Microsoft Hololens 2 headset. It provides new sensor and communication capabilities to individual soldiers. The Army has also begun developing equipment using the same technology for dogs.

== See also ==
- Biological weapon
- Bomb
- Chemical weapon
- Equipment of the United States Armed Forces
- Equipment of the United States Air Force
- Equipment of the United States Coast Guard
- Equipment of the United States Marine Corps
- Equipment of the United States Navy
- Explosive
- Improvised explosive device
- List of bullpup firearms
- List of equipment of the United States Army during World War II
- Military
- Nuclear warfare
- Radiological warfare
- Strategy
- United States hand grenades
- War
- Weapon
- Weapons of Mass Destruction
