= List of equipment of the United States Marine Corps =

The following is a list (of lists) of United States Marine Corps equipment;

See the following articles;

- List of weapons of the United States Marine Corps
- List of vehicles of the United States Marine Corps
- List of active aircraft of the United States Marine Corps
- List of United States Marine Corps individual equipment
  - Uniforms of the United States Marine Corps
  - Badges of the United States Marine Corps
  - Fleet Marine Force insignia

== See also ==
- United States Marine Corps
- Equipment of the United States Armed Forces
- Equipment of the United States Navy
- Equipment of the United States Air Force
- Equipment of the United States Army
- Equipment of the United States Coast Guard
