= List of equipment of the United States Air Force =

The equipment of the United States Air Force can be subdivided into: aircraft, ammunition, weapons, and ground vehicles.

== Munitions ==
Name	Type	Picture
Missiles
AGM-114	Air-to-surface	
AGM-65	Air-to-surface	
AGM-86	Air-to-surface, cruise	
AGM-88	Air-to-surface, anti-radiation	
AGM-154	Glide bomb	
AGM-158	Air-to-surface, cruise	
AIM-7	Air-to-air, medium-range	
AIM-9	Air-to-air, short-range	
AIM-120	Air-to-air, medium-range	
LGM-30	Intercontinental ballistic	
Bombs
B61	Thermonuclear	
B83	Thermonuclear	
BLU-109	Bunker buster	
BLU-116	Bunker buster	
CBU-87	Cluster	
CBU-89	Cluster	
CBU-97	Cluster	
GBU-10	Precision-guided	
GBU-12	Precision-guided	
GBU-15	Precision-guided	
GBU-16	Precision-guided	
GBU-24	Precision-guided	
GBU-27	Precision-guided	
GBU-28	Precision-guided	
GBU-31	Precision-guided	
GBU-32	Precision-guided	
GBU-38	Precision-guided	
GBU-39	Precision-guided	
GBU-53	Precision-guided	
GBU-54	Precision-guided	
GBU-55	Precision-guided	
GBU-56	Precision-guided	
GBU-57	Precision-guided / bunker buster	
GBU-69	Precision-guided / Glide-Bomb	
GBU-72	Precision-guided / bunker buster	
Mk-82	General-purpose	
Mk-84	General-purpose	

== Weapons ==
Name	Type	Picture	Ammunition	Used by
Mounted Weapons
GAU-8 Avenger	Seven-barrelled Rotary cannon		30×173 mm	A-10/OA-10 Thunderbolt II
GAU-22/A	Four-barrelled Rotary cannon		25×137 mm	F-35 Lightning II
M61	Six-barrelled Rotary cannon		20×102mm Vulcan	F-15 Eagle; F-16 Fighting Falcon; F-22 Raptor
GAU-23/A	Chain gun autocannon		30×173mm	AC-130
M102	Howitzer		105×372mmR	AC-130
GAU-16			.50 BMG	UH-1 Iroquois
GAU-17	Six-barrelled Minigun/Rotary machine gun		7.62×51mm NATO	HH-60 Pave Hawk; UH-1 Iroquois
M240 Mounted			7.62×51mm NATO	UH-1 Iroquois
Small arms
Beretta M9	Pistol		9×19mm Parabellum	
M11 pistol	Pistol		9×19mm Parabellum	
M18 pistol	Pistol		9×19mm Parabellum	
M4/M4A1	Assault rifle, Carbine		5.56×45mm NATO	
HK416	Assault rifle, Carbine		5.56×45mm NATO	Used exclusively by AFSOC
M16A2 rifle	Assault Rifle		5.56×45mm NATO	
MP5 submachine gun	Submachine gun		Multiple (9×19mm Parabellum, 10mm Auto MP5/10, or .40 S&W M5/40)	
M249 machine gun	Light machine gun, Squad automatic weapon		5.56×45mm NATO	
M240 machine gun	General purpose medium machine gun		7.62×51mm NATO	
M2 machine gun	Heavy machine gun		.50 BMG	
M82	Anti-materiel sniper rifle		.50 BMG	

== Vehicles ==
=== Aircraft ===
- List of active United States Air Force aircraft
- List of active United States military aircraft

Aircraft are listed in the table below alphabetically by the 1962 United States Tri-Service aircraft designation system "Basic Mission" or "Vehicle Type" code (ignoring preceding "Modified Mission" or "Status Prefix" codes), then serially by "Design number", then alphabetically by "Series letter" and lastly alphabetically by "Modified Mission" or "Status Prefix" code when applicable. Aircraft without a 1962 Tri-Service designation system designation are listed alphabetically at the end of the table.

Aircraft	Manufacturer	Origin	Propulsion	Role	Control	Introduced/IOC	Inventory	Notes
OA-1K Skyraider II	L3Harris	USA	Propeller	CAS / Attack	Manned	2025	8	SOF support
A-10C Thunderbolt II	Fairchild Republic	USA	Jet	CAS / Attack	Manned	2007 (A-10C)	162	The Air Force is seeking to retire all A-10s in FY2026.
A-29C Super Tucano	Sierra Nevada Corporation	Brazil	Propeller	Research and development	Manned	2003	3	Delivered to Air Force Special Operations Command in 2021. Transferred to the U.S. Air Force Test Pilot School in 2024.
EA-37B Compass Call	Gulfstream	USA	Jet	Radar jamming / PSYOP	Manned	2026	1	2 ordered Replacement for EC-130H Compass Call. 10 planned.
B-1 Lancer	Rockwell International	USA	Jet	Bomber	Manned	1986	40	Long-range conventional bomber. Employs variable-sweep wing design. To be replaced by the B-21 Raider around 2032. The Air Force is seeking to divest one B-1 in FY2026.
B-2 Spirit	Northrop Grumman	USA	Jet	Bomber	Manned	1997	20	Stealth long-range nuclear-capable heavy bomber. To be replaced by the B-21 Raider around 2032. One aircraft to be divested in FY2025.
B-21 Raider	Northrop Grumman	USA	Jet	Bomber	Optionally piloted		3	Stealth long-range nuclear-capable heavy bomber. The first B-21 test aircraft made its maiden flight in November 2023. To replace the B-2 Spirit and B-1 Lancer around 2032.
B-52H Stratofortress	Boeing	USA	Jet	Bomber	Manned	1961 (B-52H)	72	Currently undergoing re-engining. Expected to serve into the 2050s. One aircraft crashed on 15 June 2026.
C-5M Super Galaxy	Lockheed	USA	Jet	Strategic airlifter	Manned	2014 (C-5M)	52	
C-12C/D/F/J Huron	Beechcraft	USA	Propeller	Transport	Manned	c. 1974	29	
C-17A Globemaster III	McDonnell Douglas/Boeing	USA	Jet	Strategic airlifter	Manned	1995	219	These were produced by McDonnell-Douglas prior to the merger with Boeing.
C-21A Learjet 35	Learjet	USA	Jet	VIP transport	Manned	1984	19	
VC-25A	Boeing	USA	Jet	Presidential transport	Manned	1990	2	
C-32A/B Air Force Two	Boeing	USA	Jet	VIP transport	Manned	1998	4/2	
C-37A/B Gulfstream V	Gulfstream	USA	Jet	VIP transport	Manned	1998	9/7	VIP transport. 16 planned.
C-40B/C	Boeing	USA	Jet	VIP transport	Manned	2003	4/7	
KC-46A Pegasus	Boeing	USA	Jet	Aerial refueling	Manned	FY24 (planned)	77	179 planned.
C-130H Hercules	Lockheed Martin	USA	Propeller	Tactical airlifter	Manned	c. 1974	126	The C-130J is replacing the C-130H on a one-for-one basis. The Air Force has Congressionally mandated floor of 271 C-130 aircraft. The Air Force is seeking to divest 14 C-130Hs in FY2026.
LC-130H Hercules	Lockheed Martin	USA	Propeller	Cargo aircraft	Manned	c. 1984	10	Assigned to 109th Airlift Wing
C-130J Super Hercules/J-30 Super Hercules	Lockheed Martin	USA	Propeller	Tactical airlifter	Manned	2006	151	
AC-130J Ghostrider	Lockheed Martin	USA	Propeller	CAS / Attack	Manned	2017 (AC-130J)	31	Final aircraft delivered in 2022.
HC-130J Combat King II	Lockheed Martin	USA	Propeller	Search and rescue	Manned	2013	39	
MC-130J Commando II	Lockheed Martin	USA	Propeller	Multi-mission/Special Operations	Manned	2012	57	64 planned.
WC-130J Hercules	Lockheed Martin	USA	Propeller	Weather reconnaissance	Manned	2006	10	Assigned to 403d Wing
WC-135R Constant Phoenix	Boeing	USA	Jet	Atmospheric research	Manned	2022 (WC-135R)	3	
KC-135R/T Stratotanker	Boeing	USA	Jet	Aerial refueling	Manned	1957	376	The Air Force is seeking to divest 14 KC-135 in FY2026.
TC-135S/W	Boeing	USA	Jet	Trainer	Manned	1961	3	
RC-135S/U/V/W Cobra Ball/Combat Sent/Rivet Joint	Boeing	USA	Jet	Reconnaissance / ELINT / surveillance	Manned	1972	25	
C-146A Wolfhound	Fairchild-Dornier	Germany	Propeller	Transport	Manned	c. 2011	20	Delivered 2011–2017. Flown with the 524th Special Operations Squadron
C-147A	De Havilland Canada	Canada	Propeller	Transport	Manned			For the U.S. Army Parachute Team
E-3B/G Sentry (AWACS)	Boeing	USA	Jet	AWACS	Manned	1977; 2014 (Block 40/45)	15	To be replaced by the E-2D Hawkeye.
E-4B (NAOC)	Boeing	USA	Jet	Command and control	Manned	1978 (E-4B)	4	Assigned to the 595th Command and Control Group. To be replaced by the Survivable Airborne Operations Center.
E-9A Widget	De Havilland Canada	Canada	Propeller	Surveillance	Manned	1988	2	Military surveillance version of the DHC-8-100, used for missile range control.
E-11A (BACN)	Northrop Grumman	USA / Canada	Jet	Command and control / BACN	Manned	c. 2011	5	2 aircraft to be divested in FY2025. Nine planned.
F-15C/D Eagle	McDonnell Douglas	USA	Jet	Air superiority	Manned	1979 (F-15C/D)	108	F-15C retired from active service in 2025. 12 D variants are used for training. The Air Force is seeking to divest 13 F-15C and Ds s in FY2026.
F-15E Strike Eagle	McDonnell Douglas/Boeing	USA	Jet	Multirole, primarily strike	Manned	1989	218	The Air Force is seeking to divest 21 F-15Es FY2026.
F-15EX Eagle II	Boeing	USA	Jet	Multirole, primarily strike	Manned	2024 (planned)	8	F-15C/D Eagle replacement. 267 planned.
QF-16A/C	Boeing	USA	Jet	Target drone	Optionally piloted	2016	73	Conversion of an F-16 Fighting Falcon to full-scale aerial target. Final deliveries will take place 2024–2025. 126 planned.
F-16C/D Fighting Falcon	General Dynamics	USA	Jet	Multirole	Manned	1981 (Block 25-32); 1989 (Block 40/42); 1994 (Block 50/52)	762	The Air Force is seeking to divest 62 F-16C/Ds in FY2026.
F-22A Raptor	Lockheed Martin	USA	Jet	Air superiority	Manned	2005	183	Stealth aircraft. To be succeeded by the F-47.
F-35A Lightning II	Lockheed Martin	USA	Jet	Multirole	Manned	2016	302	7 on order 1,763 planned.
F-117 Nighthawk	Lockheed	USA	Jet	Aggressor aircraft/research and development	Manned	1983	4	Although officially retired in 2008, the aircraft has been involved in various exercises beginning around 2020. The Air Force possesses 45 F-117s, some in flyable condition, As of 2023. The Air Force plans to operate the type through 2034.
TG-15A			Glider	Trainer	Manned		2	
TG-15B			Glider	Trainer	Manned		3	
TG-16A			Glider	Trainer	Manned		19	
TG-17A			Glider	Trainer	Manned		1	MDM MDM-1 Fox donated to the 94th Flying Training Squadron.
TH-1H Iroquois	Bell	USA	Helicopter	Trainer	Manned	c. 2009	28	Light lift training helicopter To be replaced by the MH-139A.
UH-1N Twin Huey/UH-1N Operational Support Airlift	Bell	USA	Helicopter	Utility	Manned	1970	63	Light lift helicopter. To be replaced by the MH-139 Grey Wolf. The Air Force is seeking to divest 4 UH-1Ns in FY2026.
HH-60G/U Pave Hawk	Sikorsky	USA	Helicopter	CSAR	Manned	1982	64	To be replaced by the HH-60W Jolly Green II.The Air Force is seeking to divest 11 HH-60G in FY2026.
HH-60W Jolly Green II	Sikorsky	USA	Helicopter	CSAR	Manned	2022	32	To replace the HH-60G/U Pave Hawk. 85 planned.
MH-139A Grey Wolf	AgustaWestland		Helicopter	Utility	Manned	2023 (planned)	7	6 test aircraft and 1 production aircraft have been delivered. 20 on order. 42 planned.
P-9A Pale Ale	Bombardier	Canada	Propeller	Maritime patrol	Manned		4	Government-owned contractor-operated fleet tasked with monitoring drug trafficking.
RQ-4B Global Hawk	Northrop Grumman	USA	Jet	ISTAR	Unmanned	2011 (Block 30), 2016 (Block 40)	9	
MQ-9A Reaper	General Atomics	USA	Propeller	Multi-mission	Unmanned	2007, 2015 (ER)	55	
RQ-20 Puma	AeroVironment	USA	Propeller	Patrol	Unmanned	2008		
RQ-170 Sentinel	Lockheed Martin	USA	Jet	Multi-Mission	Unmanned	2007		
T-1A Jayhawk	Raytheon	USA	Jet	Trainer	Manned	1993	127	Multi-engine trainer. The Air Force is seeking to divest 35 T-1s in FY2026.
T-6A Texan II	Raytheon/Beechcraft	USA	Propeller	Trainer	Manned	2000	442	
T-7 Red Hawk	Boeing / Saab	USA	Jet	Trainer	Manned	2028 (planned)	2	Replacement for the T-38 Talon. The first five test aircraft will be production representative. 351 planned.
T-38A/C/AT-38B Talon	Northrop	USA	Jet	Trainer	Manned	1961	495	To be replaced by the T-7A. The Air Force is seeking to divest 17 T-38A/Cs in FY2026.
T-41D Mescalero	Cessna	USA	Propeller	Basic trainer	Manned	1964	4	
T-51A Cessna	Cessna	USA	Propeller	Basic trainer	Manned	1957	3	
T-53A Kadet II	Cirrus	USA	Propeller	Basic trainer	Manned	1995	24	USAFA flight training aircraft
U-2S Dragon Lady	Lockheed	USA	Jet	Reconnaissance	Manned	c. 1981 (U-2R)	27	The Air Force plans to divest all U-2s and TU-2s in FY2027.
TU-2S Dragon Lady	Lockheed	USA	Jet	Conversion trainer	Manned		4	The Air Force is seeking to divest all U-2s and TU-2s in FY2027.
U-28A Draco/PC-12	Pilatus	Switzerland	Propeller	Utility	Manned	1991	30 U-28A/5 PC-12	PC-12 used for training. Used by SOCOM for reconnaissance. To be replaced in SOCOM by the OA-1K Sky Warden.
UV-18B Twin Otter	De Havilland Canada	Canada	Propeller	Utility	Manned	1988	3	USAFA parachute training aircraft
CV-22B Osprey	Bell, Boeing	USA	Tiltrotor	CSAR / transport	Manned	2006	52	2 on order. Two aging CV-22Bs will be divested in FY2025 and be replaced with new aircraft.
X-62 VISTA	General Dynamics	USA	Jet	In-flight simulator	Optionally piloted	1992	1	A highly modified version of the F-16D incorporating artificial intelligence used by the U.S. Air Force Test Pilot School
BQM-167 Skeeter	Composite Engineering		Jet	Target drone	Unmanned	2008	37	Subscale aerial target. 800+ planned.
CN-235	CASA	Spain	Propeller	Reconnaissance	Manned	1988	5	Flown with the 427th Special Operations Squadron
Dzyne ULTRA	DZYNE Technologies	USA	Propeller	Surveillance	Unmanned	c. 2024		

=== Ground vehicles ===
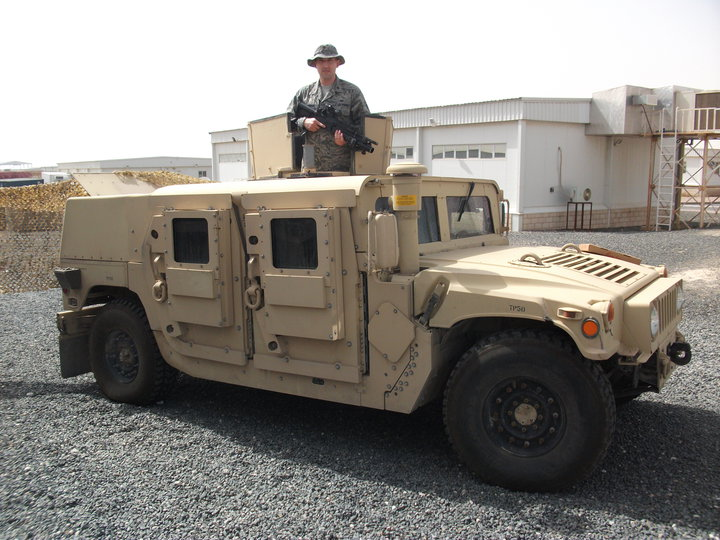
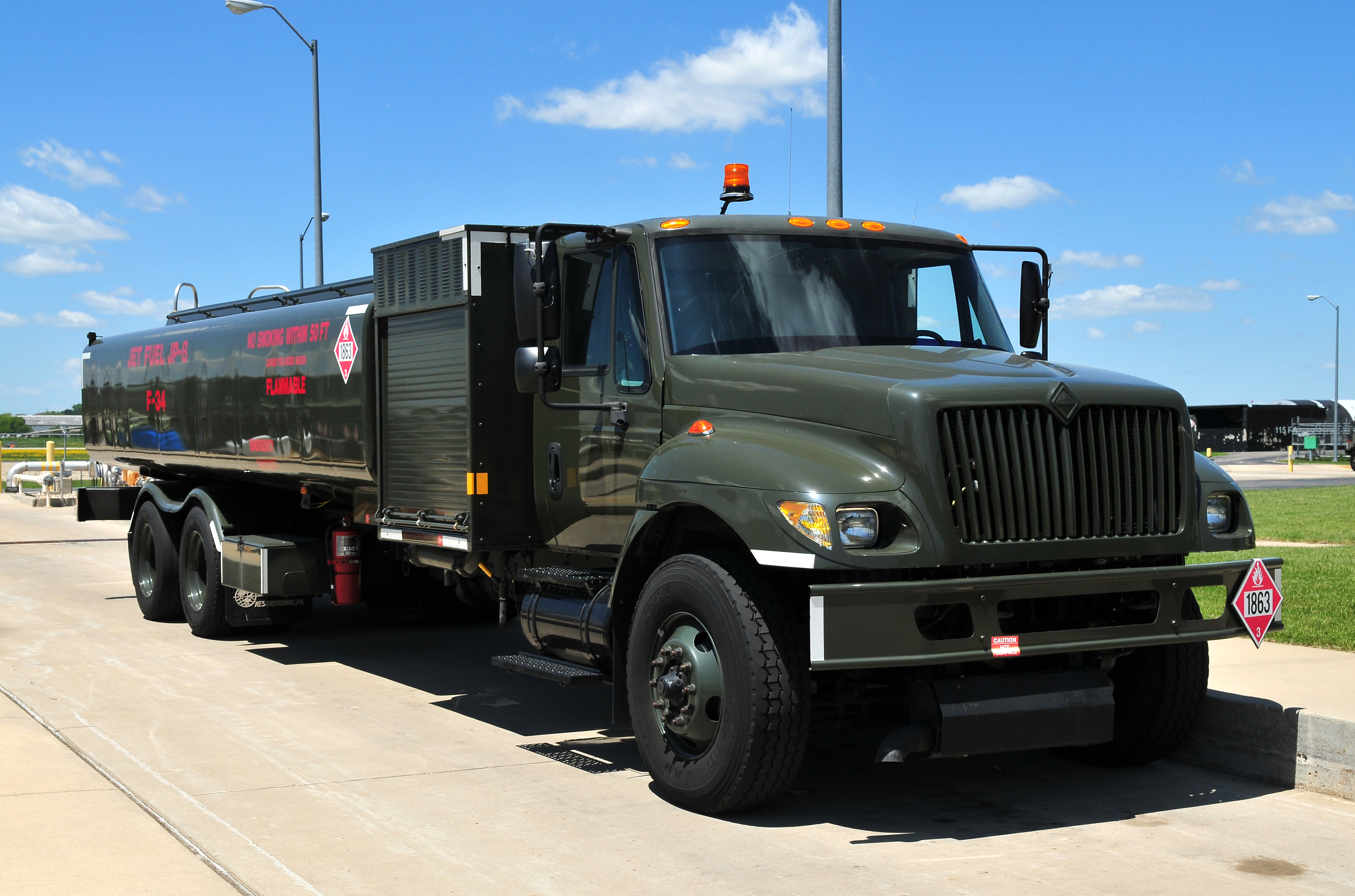
Name	Type	Versions	Quantity	Picture
Humvee	Armored car		?
R-5 Refueler	Aircraft refueling vehicle		?
R-9 Refueler	Aircraft refueling vehicle		?
R-11 Refueler	Aircraft refueling vehicle		?
C300	Ground refuel vehicle		?

== Attire ==
Current attire
Name	Full pattern	Notes
Army Combat Uniform		Uses Operational Camouflage Pattern (OCP). Airman Battle Uniform phased out April 2021
Flight suit		Pilots, air crews and missile crews wear olive green or desert tan one-piece flight suits made of Nomex for fire protection.
Physical Training Uniform		Consists of shorts, T-shirt, jacket and pants.
Service dress uniform		Consists of a three-button coat, similar to that of a men's "sport jacket" (with silver "U.S." pins on the lapels), matching trousers, and either a service cap or flight cap, all in Shade 1620, "Air Force Blue" (a darker purplish-blue). This is worn with a light blue shirt (Shade 1550) and Shade 1620 herringbone patterned necktie. Enlisted members wear sleeve insignia on both the jacket and shirt, while officers wear metal rank insignia pinned onto the coat, and Air Force Blue slide-on epaulet loops on the shirt.
Mess dress		Consists of a dark blue mess jacket and matching trousers with antiqued silver buttons, miniature medals, blue bow-tie and cummerbund, and shoulder boards and silver wrist braids for officers. When wearing the blue tie and cummerbund, the uniform is considered equivalent to black-tie formal wear. For white-tie occasions, a white bow-tie and waistcoat are worn.

== Other equipment ==
- CMU – 33A/P22P-18 - Air Force issue personal flotation device
- Distributed Common Ground System- A weapons system which delivers information to Unmanned aerial vehicles

== See also ==
- United States Air Force
- List of active United States military aircraft
- Equipment of the United States Armed Forces
- Equipment of the United States Navy
- Equipment of the United States Army
- Equipment of the United States Coast Guard
- Equipment of the United States Marine Corps

== Sources ==
- 2024 World Air Forces (Report). Flight Global. 2023.
- Church, Aaron M. U. (2023). USAF & USSF Almanac 2023 Weapons & Platforms (PDF). Air & Space Forces Magazine (Report). Air & Space Forces Association.
- Church, Aaron M. U. (2024). USAF & USSF Almanac 2024 Weapons & Platforms (PDF). Air & Space Forces Magazine (Report). Air & Space Forces Association.
- "Department of Defense Report on Force Structure Changes for the Fiscal Year (FY) 2025 Defense Budget" (PDF). Office of the Under Secretary of Defense (Comptroller)/Chief Financial Officer. April 2024.
