= Countermine System =

Anti-land-mine system

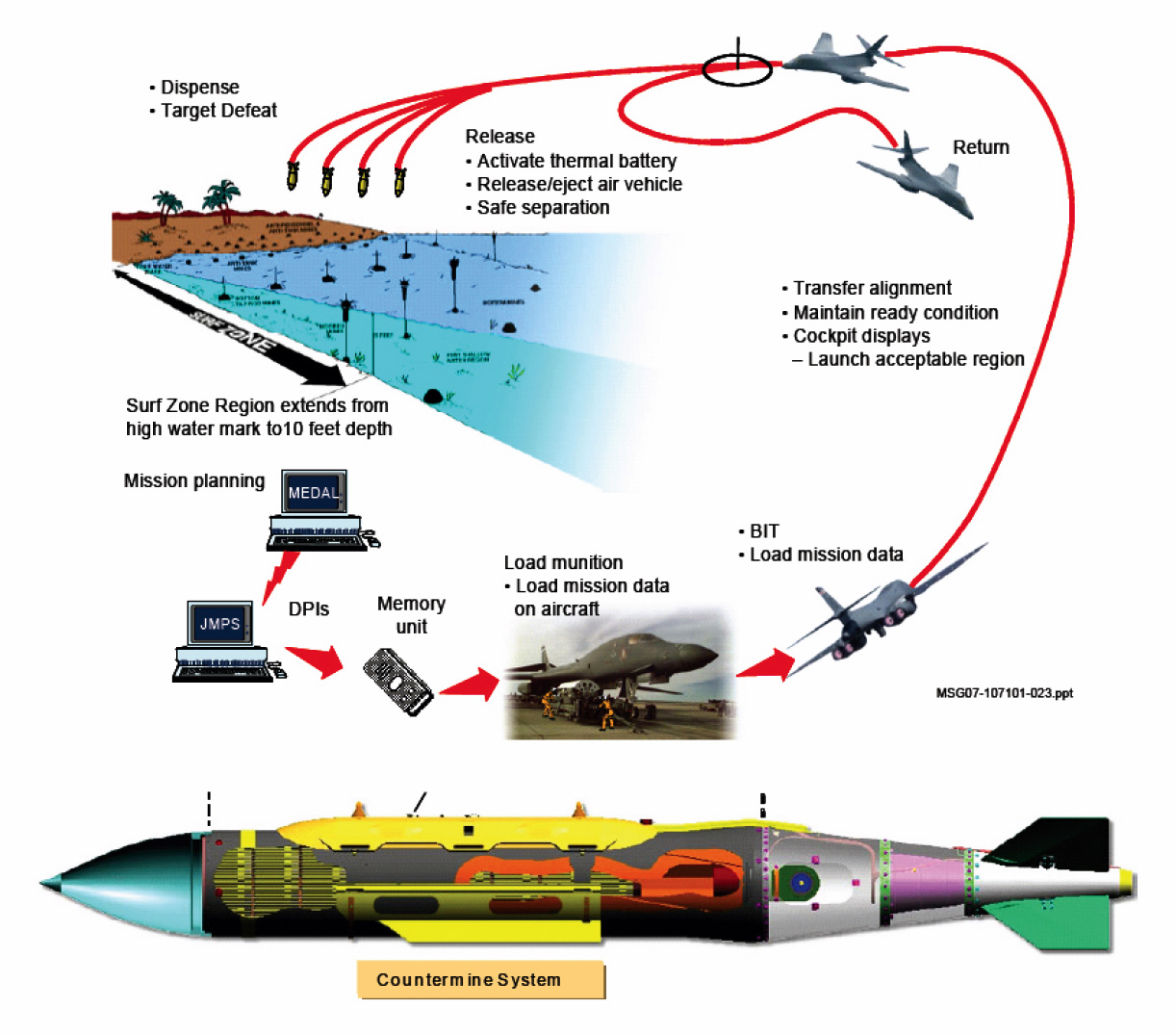
Diagram depicting the operation of the Countermine system

The Countermine System (CMS), also known as Venom Darts, Venom Penetrators and GBU-61, is an anti-land-mine system consisting of chemical or explosive projectiles released from modified GPS-guided bombs. The darts are used to detonate or deactivate land mines in beach and surf zones. The system was developed by the United States (U.S.) Navy and Boeing at an initial cost of US$153-million. The CMS is expected to be field ready by 2016.

== Description ==
The CMS typically consists of 4,000 .50-caliber darts containing the chemical diethylenetriamine (DETA) or a small amount of explosive, carried by 2,000-pound (910 kg) GPS-guided Joint Direct Attack Munitions (JDAM) systems. The tungsten tipped darts, each about 5.9 inches (15 cm) long, are clustered in multiple layers within a 7-foot (2.1 m) tubular canister contained within the JDAM.

The system uses data from the Coastal Battlefield Reconnaissance and Analysis (COBRA) system to locate surf zone mines. This positional data is used to program JDAM Assault Breaching System (JABS) bombs, which are dropped over mine fields from Air Force or Navy aircraft from an altitude of about 1,000 feet (300 m). The JDAM bombs, identical in form to BLU-109 bombs, are equipped with a corkscrew mechanism that releases the inner canister with a rotational motion, causing panels to separate and the payload of darts to deploy in a 60 foot (18 m) diameter circular pattern. The darts penetrate the soil, or water and sand, at a velocity of 300 metres (980 ft) per second. The darts, capable of penetrating more than 10 feet (3.0 m) of water or 2 feet (0.61 m) of sand, either detonate or deactivate the land mines. Remaining unactivated darts eventually become inert.

Each CMS unit has a projected cost of $300,000 to $360,000.

== Development ==
The system was developed by the U.S. Office of Naval Research to address the problem of 70 million hidden land mines, some which have killed or maimed more than 13,000 U.S. soldiers since 2001. In 2008, the Naval Surface Warfare Center awarded a $153-million contract to Boeing to design and develop the system, along with a project team of defense contractors including Lockheed Martin, General Dynamics, and Nammo-Talley Defense Systems. The CMS is expected to be field operational by 2016.

== See also ==
- AMMAD
