= Aids to Navigation Boat =

United States Coast Guard boat

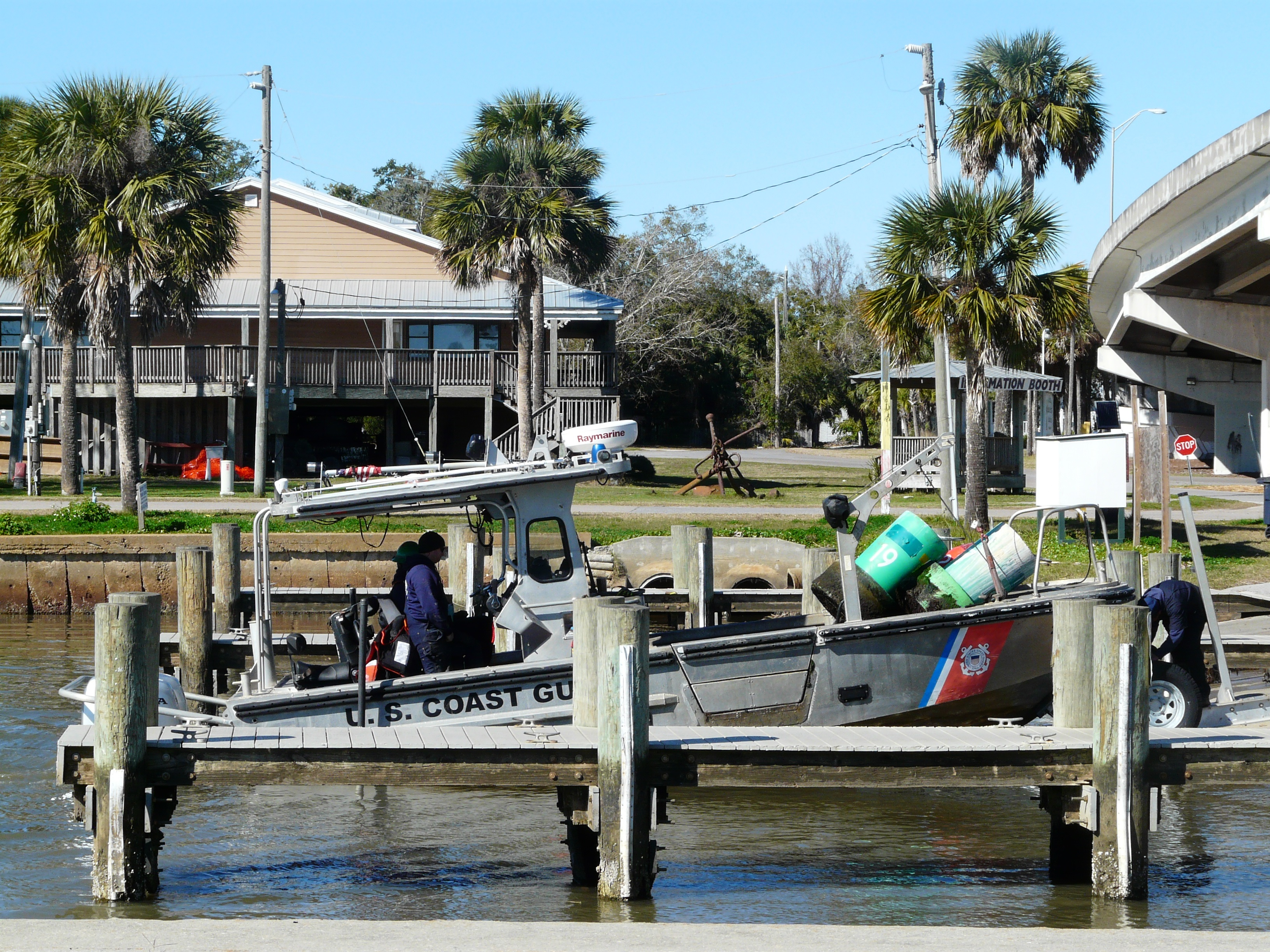
TANB-25

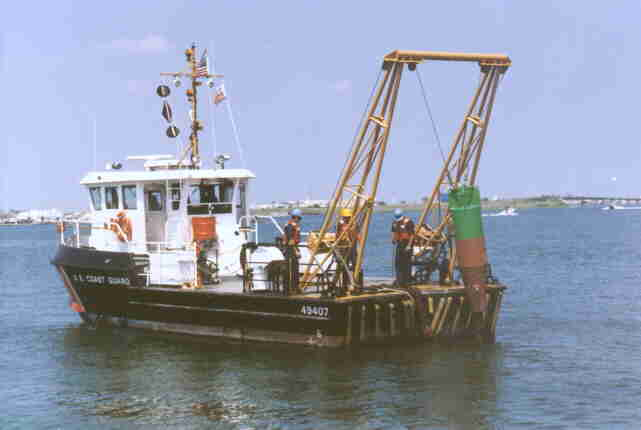
BUSL-49

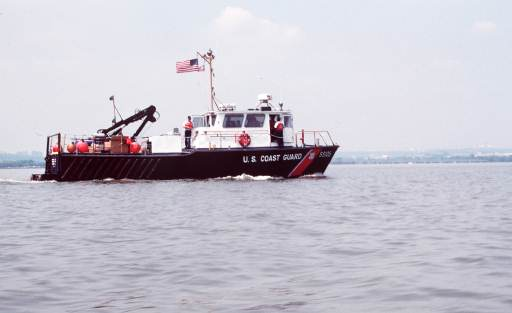
ANB-55

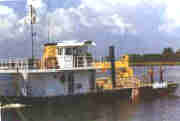
ANB-64

The United States Coast Guard maintains roughly 145 Aids to Navigation Boats. These boats were designed primarily to serve within the inland waters of the United States. These vessels include TANB/BUSL/ATON/ANB ranging from 16 to 55 feet in length.

Most Aids to Navigation Boats of the United States Coast Guard are stationed with Aids to Navigation Teams (ANT). These are teams of boatswain's mates, machinery technicians, electrician's mates, and non-rated personnel that service small buoys, jetty lights and lighthouses.

== Boats ==
- 64-ft Aids to Navigation Boat (ANB) Similar to the 55 ft ANB, there are 2 boats, one is in Galveston, Texas (65402). The additional nine feet is added to the pilothouse and crew quarters. It has a higher capacity crane, with a longer reach and a large "V" cut into the stern platform to allow the boat to more readily maintain contact with an aid even under wave conditions. It is powered by two 825 hp DD 12V71TA two stroke diesel engines and has a 7.5 kW diesel generator to provide air conditioning/heat, power for a full galley and refrigerated storage, and electric power tools. The 64 has a full galley and head with shower and sleeps 5 in three staterooms. It holds 500 US gal of fuel, 250 of water, and is capable of speeds of 30 kn. The 64 operates in the Houston Ship Channel and ICW areas and is equipped to stay deployed three days.
- 55-ft Aids to Navigation Boat (ANB) Equipped with a crane that is used for hoisting and securing the various buoys and aids to navigation that the Coast Guard supplies for waterways. The boat is 55 ft long to the transom, and 58 ft 9 in to the end of the swim platform. It is 25 ft tall unfixed and has a navigational draft of 8 ft. The 55-ft ANB goes approximately 25 knots when at full speed. The 55-ft ANB is often employed to service offshore aids as well.
- 49-ft Buoy Utility Stern Loading (BUSL): LOA 49 ft 2 1/4 in, beam 16 ft 10 in, highest fixed point 15 ft, highest unfixed 27 ft, hoisting capacity 71,690 lb, draft 5 ft 6 in
- 26-ft Trailerable Aids to Navigation Boat (TANB): LOA: 29 ft 7 in, beam: 8 feet, draft: 2 ft 4 in, engines: twin 150 hp 4-cycle outboard motors, cruise speed: 30 kn at 4,800 rpm, range: 170 nmi at 4,800 rpm, hoisting capacity (SWL): 500 lb
- 20-ft Aids to Navigation Boat - Small (AB-S): LOA 21 ft, beam 8 ft 6 in, draft 16 in, fuel capacity 70 US gal, weight 2,700 lb, Max hp 250.
- 24-ft Cutterboat - Aids to Navigation - Large (CB-ATON-L): LOA 23 ft, beam 8 ft, draft 20 in, fuel cap 80 US gal, weight 3,500 lb, Max hp 300.
- 18-ft Cutterboat - Aids to Navigation - Medium (CB-ATON-M): LOA 18 ft, beam 7 ft 6 in, draft 14 in, fuel 40 US gal, weight 2,500 lb, Max hp 250. Originally designated the Aids to Navigation Boat - Punt (AB-PNT) is used by Construction Tenders to transport equipment to a construction site and also used at small boat stations for emergency response to floods or areas where a shallow water response is necessary.
- 16-ft Aids to Navigation Boat – Skiff (AB-SKF): LOA 16 ft, beam 6 ft 10 in, draft 6 in, fuel 12 US gal, weight 800 lb, 60 hp. The AB-SKF is deployed from Coast Guard cutters (ships) or Aids to Navigation Teams in support of mission activities primarily in support of aid to navigation servicing, construction, repair and discrepancy response.

The AB-SKF and CB-ATON-M were apparently procured to replace the UTL (Utility Boat Light), which was a variety of non-standard small boat types.
