= List of United States Coast Guard radio stations =

The United States Coast Guard maintains radio stations for communication between Coast Guard units, Coast Guard units and other government entities, and Coast Guard units and the general public. Most communications take place on the VHF marine bands. For long-range communications with aircraft, Coast Guard stations use shortwave single-sideband communications. Weather and safety of navigation forecasts involve facsimile as well as other modes over shortwave and mediumwave transmissions.

According to the NTIA, the Coast Guard is the seventh-biggest user of radio spectrum in the United States. The U.S. Coast Guard maintains a network of VHF radio stations at its shore stations and on cutters and boats, as well as stations of the U.S. Coast Guard Auxiliary. In addition, the Coast Guard maintains a chain of high frequency (HF) and medium frequency (MF) radio stations that provide communications in the Atlantic and Pacific oceans, the Gulf of Mexico, and the Caribbean Sea. Coast Guard VHF Radio stations are currently being upgraded through the Rescue 21 program to meet the US obligations under the Global Maritime Distress Safety System.

== History of Coast Guard shore stations ==
The first Coast Guard shore stations were established after 1924, when the Coast Guard's mission expanded. The first shore station was at Rockaway Point Coast Guard Station, located at Fort Tilden, New York; and the network expanded to Nahant, Massachusetts; New London, Connecticut; Cape May, New Jersey; Cape Henry, Virginia (with the call sign NMN); Fernandina, Florida; Fort Lauderdale, Florida; Mobile, Alabama; San Francisco, California; San Pedro, California; Port Angeles, Washington; and Anacortes, Washington in the 1930s.

The network expanded even further in the 1940s, adding radio station NMH in Washington, D.C, among others. However, in the 1970s, the increasing use of automation caused the number of stations to contract. In 1976, for example, NMN (then at Communication Station (COMMSTA) Portsmouth) assumed the duties of NMH in Washington, and took over remote operations from Miami in 1993, Boston (NMF) in 1996, and New Orleans in 1998.

With the introduction of the computer-assisted Rescue 21 system, the ability of the Coast Guard to provide coverage on the marine VHF band in marginal areas has increased.

== Current Assignments ==
The Coast Guard radio stations are centrally operated from the Communications Command (COMMCOM). The COMMCOM is located on the U.S. Navy Support Agency Northwest Annex in Chesapeake, Virginia. The COMMCOM has a staff of approximately 100 people that execute contingency communications, conduct communications training aboard Coast Guard cutters, and operate the following stations:

- COMMCOM Chesapeake, Virginia: call sign NMN (directly)
- RCF Miami, Florida: call sign NMA (remotely)
- RCF Boston, Massachusetts: call sign NMF (remotely)
- RCF New Orleans, Louisiana: call sign NMG (remotely)
- RCF Point Reyes, California: call sign NMC (remotely)
- RCF Honolulu, HI: call sign NMO (remotely)
- RCF Kodiak, AK: call sign NOJ (remotely)

== Modes of transmission ==
These stations broadcast navigation and marine safety messages through several means, including Navigational Telex [NAVTEX] transmissions on 518 kHz; facsimile transmissions of National Weather Service charts; single sideband transmissions; and Simplex Teletype Over Radio SITOR narrow-band direct-printing broadcasts. In the 1960s through the 1980s, these transmissions were broadcast live, with the interval signal of "Semper Paratus"; however, now, using Voice Broadcast Automation (VOBRA), a computerized voice ("Perfect Paul") reads the voice messages.

NAVTEX transmissions are identified by the last letter of the callsign of the station. Each station transmits a NAVTEX broadcast six times a day, including two rebroadcasts of the general forecast. A NAVTEX broadcast includes maritime navigation warnings, weather forecasts, ice warnings, Gulf Stream locations, radio navigation information, rescue messages, and marine advisories. Each station has 2 NAVTEX transmitters.

Besides broadcast messages, Coast Guard stations handle direct traffic between aircraft, cutters, boats, and shore stations on VHF, MF, and HF frequencies, including the HF Data Link encrypted e-mail system and Digital Selective Calling (DSC), which uses radio telephone to send digitally encrypted signals to either one receiver or a group or receivers.

== Concerns ==
The use of the radio spectrum by the U.S. Coast Guard, like all U.S. Government agencies, is assigned by the Department of Commerce's National Telecommunications and Information Administration (NTIA). Specific frequency allocations are handled by the Interdepartment Radio Advisory Committee.

== The role of the Auxiliary ==
Coast Guard Auxiliary stations are privately owned stations that have been offered for use of the Government and have been approved by the Coast Guard. They may be on the marine VHF band or use HF communications. In addition, many Coast Guard Auxiliarists are qualified radio watchstanders at existing Coast Guard stations.

== Coast Guard call signs ==
Most Coast Guard land-based VHF radio stations do not use three-letter call signs as the larger communications stations do; instead, they identify themselves by the activity name, such as "Sector Baltimore", "Station Washington, D.C. (or Station Washington)". All Cutters (CG vessels 65 feet in length or greater) have four-letter international radio call signs, such as USCGC Citrus/NRPQ. Cutters normally identify themselves as "Cutter (name)". Boats identify themselves with the last digits of their registration number, for example, a Defender-class boat with the registration 25123 would be "Coast Guard 25123, while a 41-foot boat would be "Coast Guard 41345." Aircraft identify themselves by their number. A number beginning with "15,17,20" is a HC-130; "21" is a HU-25A/C/D; "23" is a HC-144A; "60" is a MH/HH-60J/T helicopter; "65 or 66" is a HH/MH-65; . Auxiliary aircraft and ships identify themselves as "Auxiliary ###".
