= Uniforms of the United States Marine Corps =

US military uniform

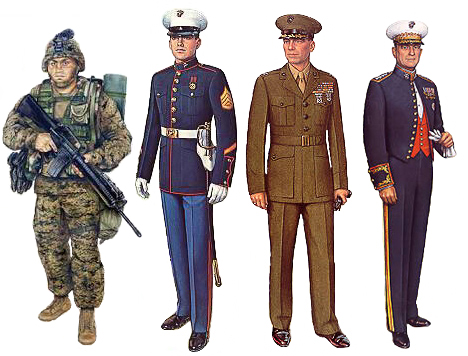
An illustration of U.S. Marines in various uniform setups. From left to right: A U.S. Marine in a Marine Corps Combat Utility Uniform with full combat load c. late 2003, a U.S. Marine in a (full) blue dress uniform, a U.S. Marine officer in a service uniform, and a U.S. Marine general in an evening dress uniform.

The United States Marine Corps (USMC) prescribes several types of military uniform to distinguish its service members from other armed services, depending on the situation.

Among current uniforms in the United States Armed Forces, the dress uniforms of the USMC have been in service the longest; the Marine Dress Blue uniform has, with few changes, been worn in essentially its current form since the late 19th century.

== History ==
=== Revolutionary War ===
“The New Uniform” Continental Marine 1776.

On 5 September 1776, the Naval Committee of the Second Continental Congress prescribed uniform regulations for the Continental forces. The Continental Marines uniform regulations specified green coats with white facings (lapels, cuffs, and coat lining), and black gaiters. Legend attributes the green color to the traditional color of sharpshooters and hunters or Jäger in German armies. More likely, green cloth was simply plentiful in Philadelphia, and it served to distinguish Marines from the red of the British or the blue of the Continental Army and Navy. Also, Sam Nicholas's hunting club wore green uniforms, hence his recommendation to the committee was for green.

Revolutionary War Marine circa 1779 with red facings.

In 1778, John Adams observed that John Paul Jones dressed his Marines aboard the Ranger in the same uniform as the British Marines (red coats with white facings).

By 1779, some Continental Marines were wearing green coats with red facings. In addition to the Continental Marines, there were several states that raised Marine detachments. The Maryland State Marines wore blue “hunting shirts”. Pennsylvania Marines wore brown coats faced green.

In 1781, a congressional order came out forbidding U.S. officers of the Army or Naval forces of wearing a uniform similar to the British.

=== The Early Republic ===

At the second founding of the United States Marine Corps in 1798, the Secretary of War authorized a blue uniform edged in red; blue chosen for naval ties, and red with sentiment for Royal Marines and John Paul Jones's Marines tradition of wearing red. In addition, a white shirt with detachable ruffles on the breast and a black leather neck stock (high neck band worn like a cravat) is mentioned.

One legend is that it supposedly served to keep a man's head erect. While this may have been the case, high collars with black stocks were common menswear at the time. Leather was most likely chosen for the simple reason it didn’t need washing and kept its shape. Another legend is that it was to protect the wearer against sword slashes. However, it is incorrect to think of the leatherneck as a protective device. Its memory is preserved by the moniker "Leatherneck", and the high collar on Marine dress uniforms. A year later, Marines were issued leftover uniforms from Anthony Wayne's Legion, blue with red facings. It was the beginnings of the Marine "dress blues". The uniforms also came with a round hat, edged in yellow.

1LT Presley O’Bannon who lead the Marines in Tripoli during the 1st Barbary War 1801. He wears the new uniform promulgated by the 1804 USMC uniform regulations.

In 1804, the coat was changed to a coatee (cutaway cut horizontally across the waist in front with tails in back). The new coat had buttonhole gold braid for officers and yellow wool tape for enlisted men in the form of chevrons across the chest. In 1810 the hat was replaced with a tall cylindrical shako as seen in the photos of the 1812 Marine Guard of the ship U.S.S. Constitution moored in Boston Harbor.

1812 Marine Guard aboard USS Constitution. They are wearing the 1810 pattern USMC uniform.

Members of 1812 Marine Guard USS Constitution, Boston MA. wear 1810 pattern uniforms.

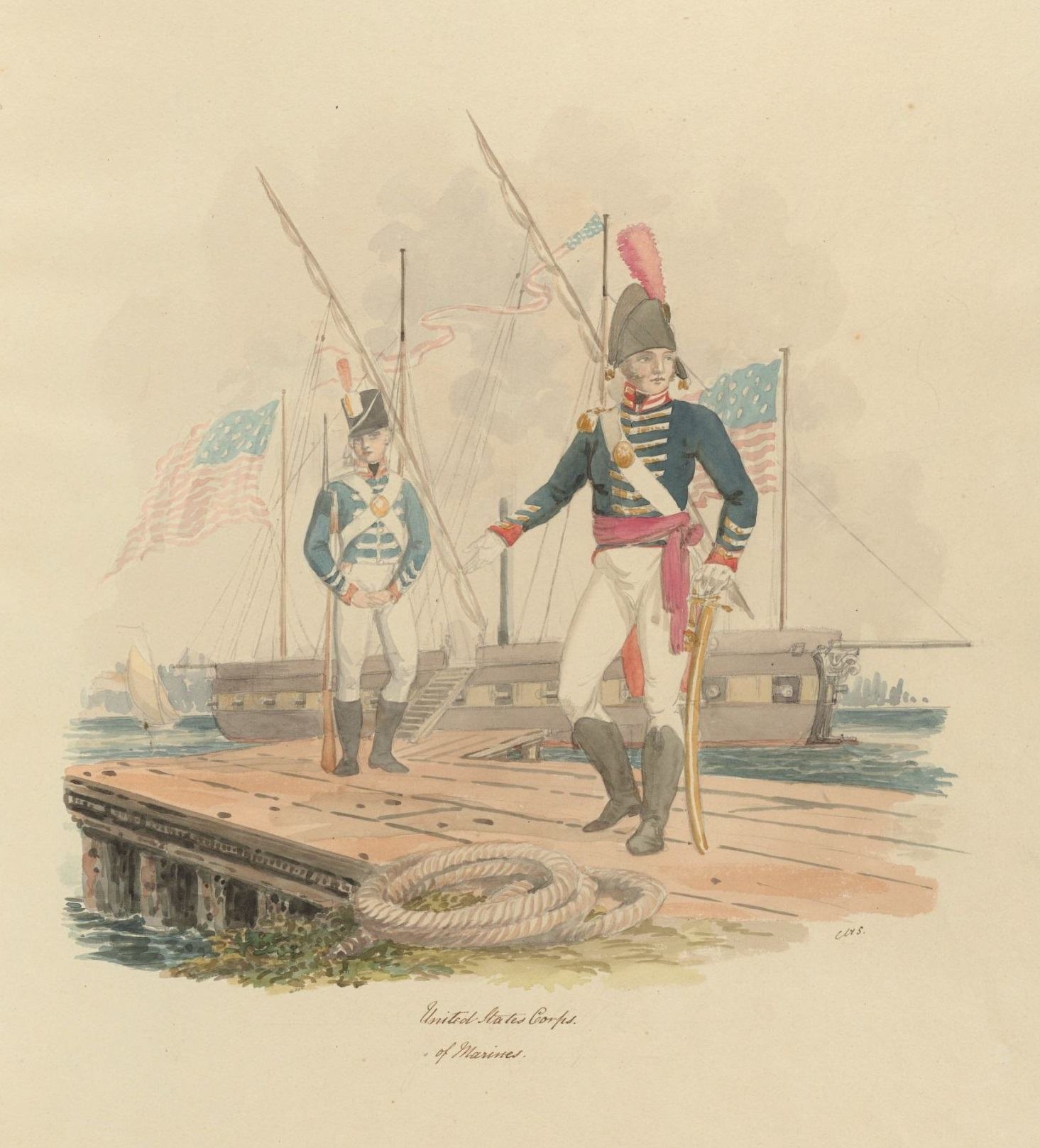
A watercolor of U.S. Marine uniforms from the War of 1812 period.

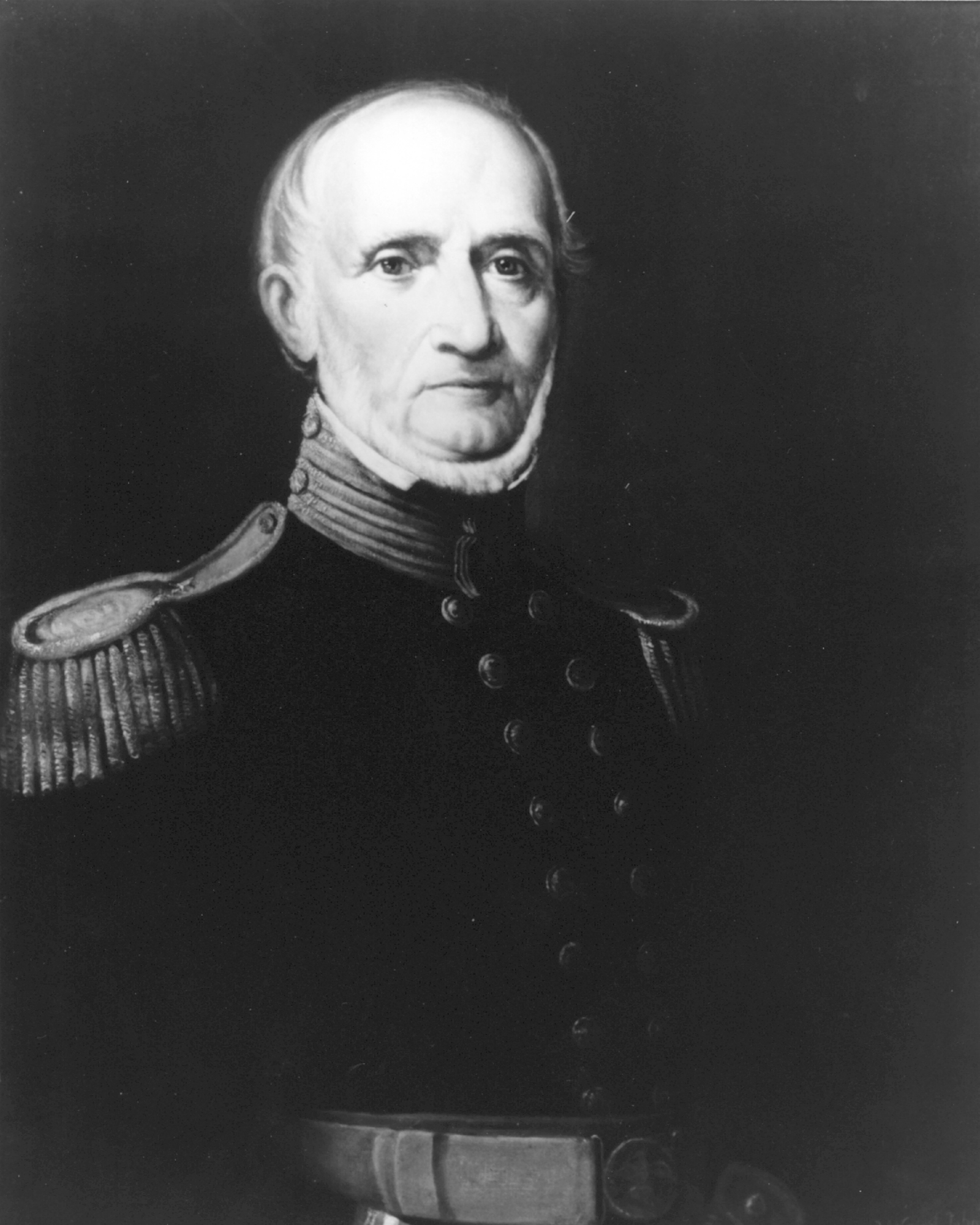
Archibald Henderson in dress uniform, circa 1820

=== The Jacksonian era ===
In 1834, President Andrew Jackson reinstated the green jackets of the Continental Marines, with gray trousers. However, Commandant Archibald Henderson said the color showed fading more than the old navy blue color.

Reproduction of the USMC 1833 pattern enlisted uniform.

1833 Dress Green Uniform Coat of then Captain Levi Twiggs USMC. The coat was worn with two gold bullion epaulettes.

The Mexican American War

In 1839, Commandant Henderson returned the uniform to blue, this time with a dark blue coat and light blue trousers with a dark blue stripe down the seam for officers and NCOs.

U.S. Marine Private wearing the new Full Dress Uniform 1839.

Lieutenant and Staff Officer USMC 1840.

1839 pattern Full Dress Coat and Mameluke Sword of then Major Levi Twiggs USMC.

Marine enlisted campaign uniform during the Mexican American War.

=== The Civil War ===
In 1859, new dress uniform regulations were issued; the new uniform had a French-style shako with an unpopular pom-pom. There was also the option of a fatigue cap, fashioned after the French képi.

=== Post-War demobilization ===
In the expeditionary period post-Civil War, Marines began wearing a khaki field uniform, better suited to tropical and arid environments.

=== Transition to global power ===
In the 1890s, the Marines adopted some practical changes to the field uniform, adding a campaign cover, with a large Marine emblem on the side, and canvas leggings.

In 1901, the emblem moved from the side to the front of the campaign cover.

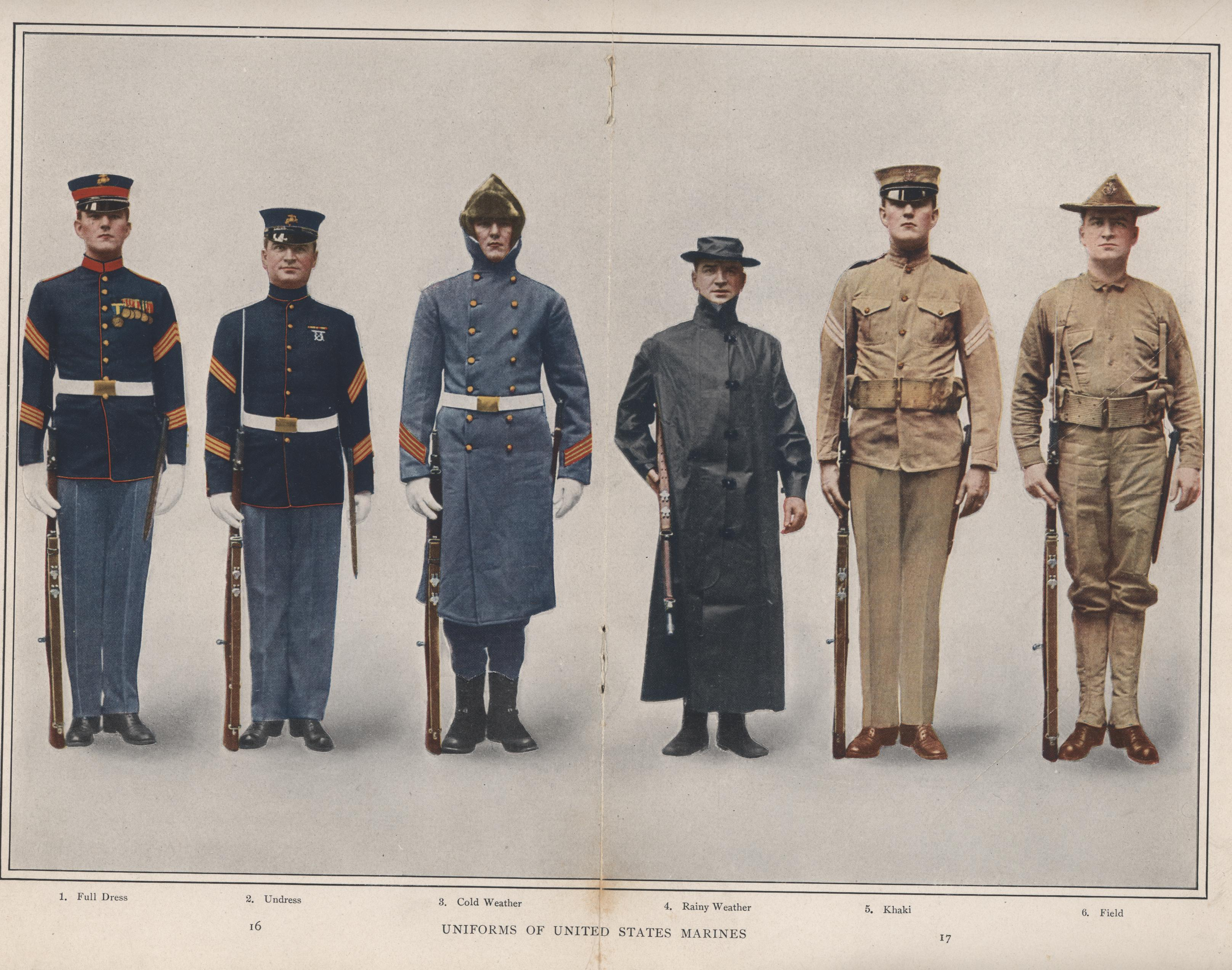
Marine Corps Enlisted Uniforms 1900.

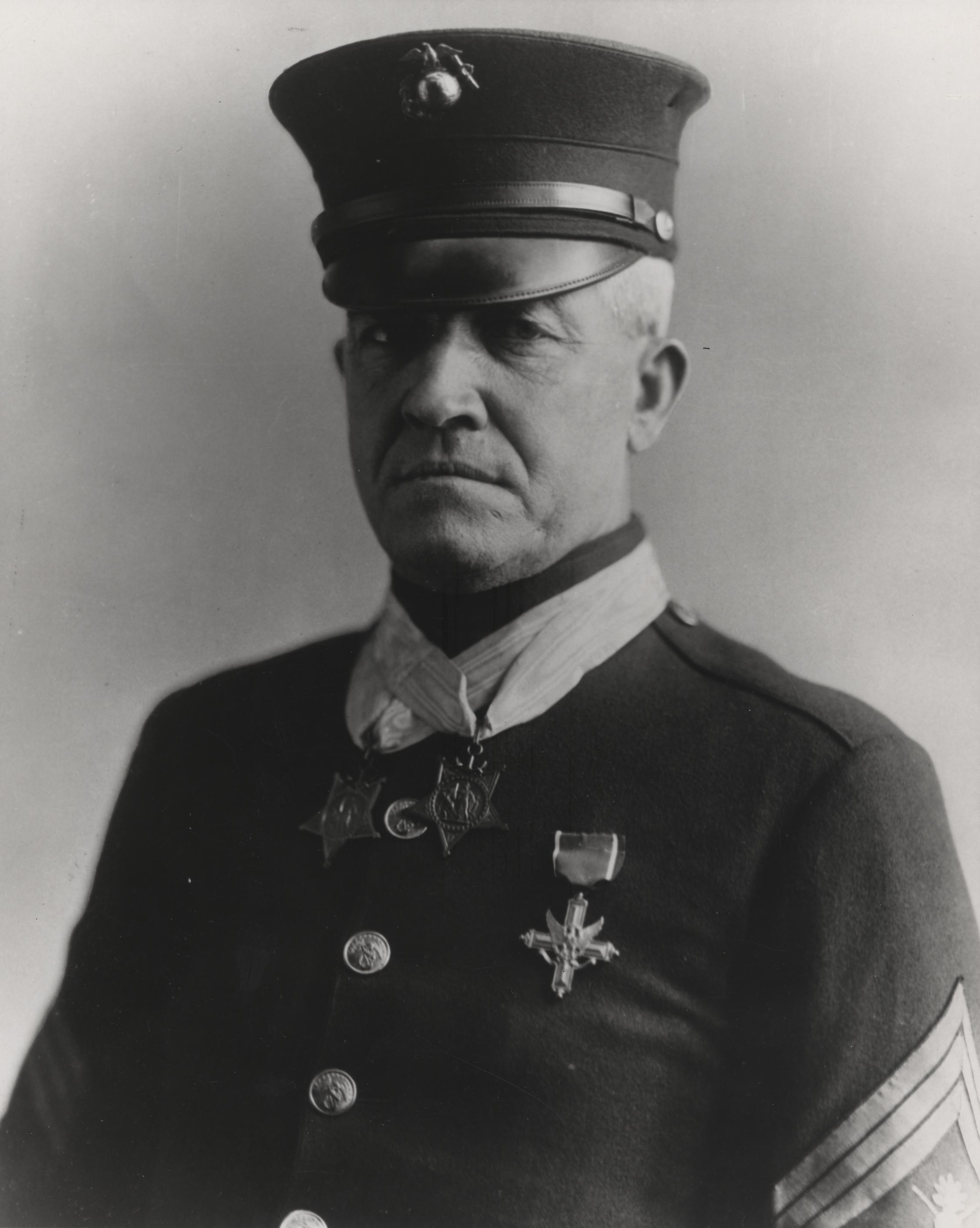
Double Medal of Honor Marine Dan Daly, circa 1919, wearing the 1912 undress blue uniform which was redesignated the dress blue uniform in 1922.

In 1912 the Corps adopted a "Montana peak" campaign cover and in the same year adopted a forest green winter uniform with a stand collar four pocket coat with either long trousers or breeches for officers and long trousers without back pockets for enlisted men.

The khaki cotton summer version featured four pockets on the coat for officers but only two upper pockets on the enlisted coat with pointed pocket flaps. The officer’s could wear breeches or trousers that came with hip and rear pockets but the enlisted trousers had no rear pockets.

=== World War I ===
When the Marines were deployed to France during World War I, they originally wore their 1912 pattern forest green winter service uniforms and campaign hats.

U.S.M.C. 1912 enlisted summer khaki uniform with “Montana peak” campagn hat and 1912 pattern winter green wool officer’s uniform.

U. S. Army commanders of the American Expeditionary Force found it was not logistically feasible to try to supply the small Marine contingent with separate uniforms and equipment from the rest of the force. Therefore, on 10 January 1918 an order was issued by the Adjutant General HQ AEF sating in part: “During the present war the regulation Army uniform will be regularly issued to Marines of the AEF, thereby gradually replacing the Marine uniform”. As a result Army disc collar devices with eagle, globe and anchor emblems were created to distinguish Marines wearing the Army uniform.

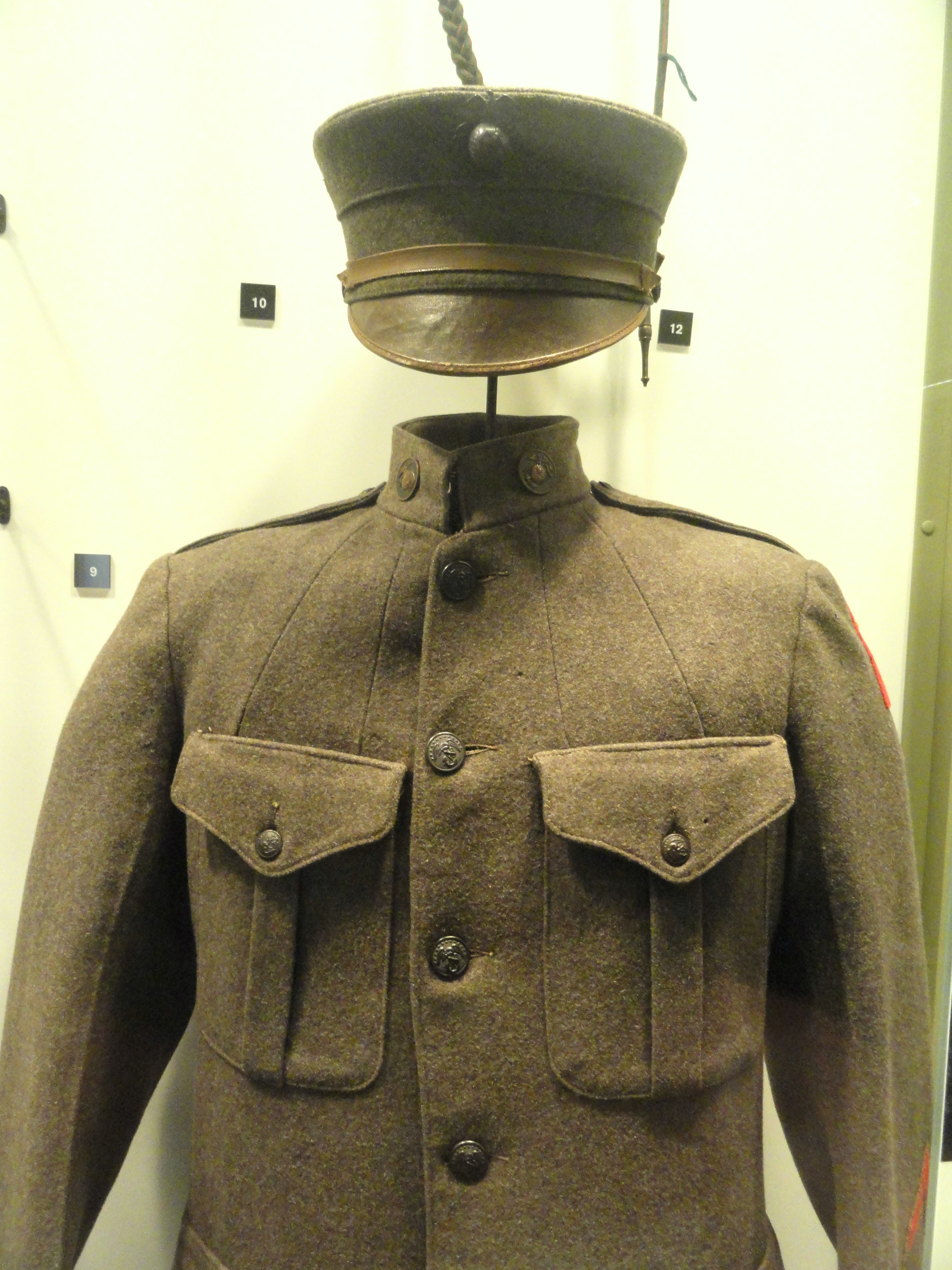
WWI Olive Drab U.S. Army uniform used by a Marine. (Note the specially made USMC collar discs for the Army uniform.)

U.S. forces adopted the new M1917 steel helmet for trench warfare in France. Therefore the campagn hats were replaced by new garrison caps which could be easily carried when the helmet was being worn. Originally the garrison caps were to be worn overseas, later it was generally adopted in 1922 for the summer service uniform in khaki cotton only. By 1929 both a summer and winter version were permanently adopted.

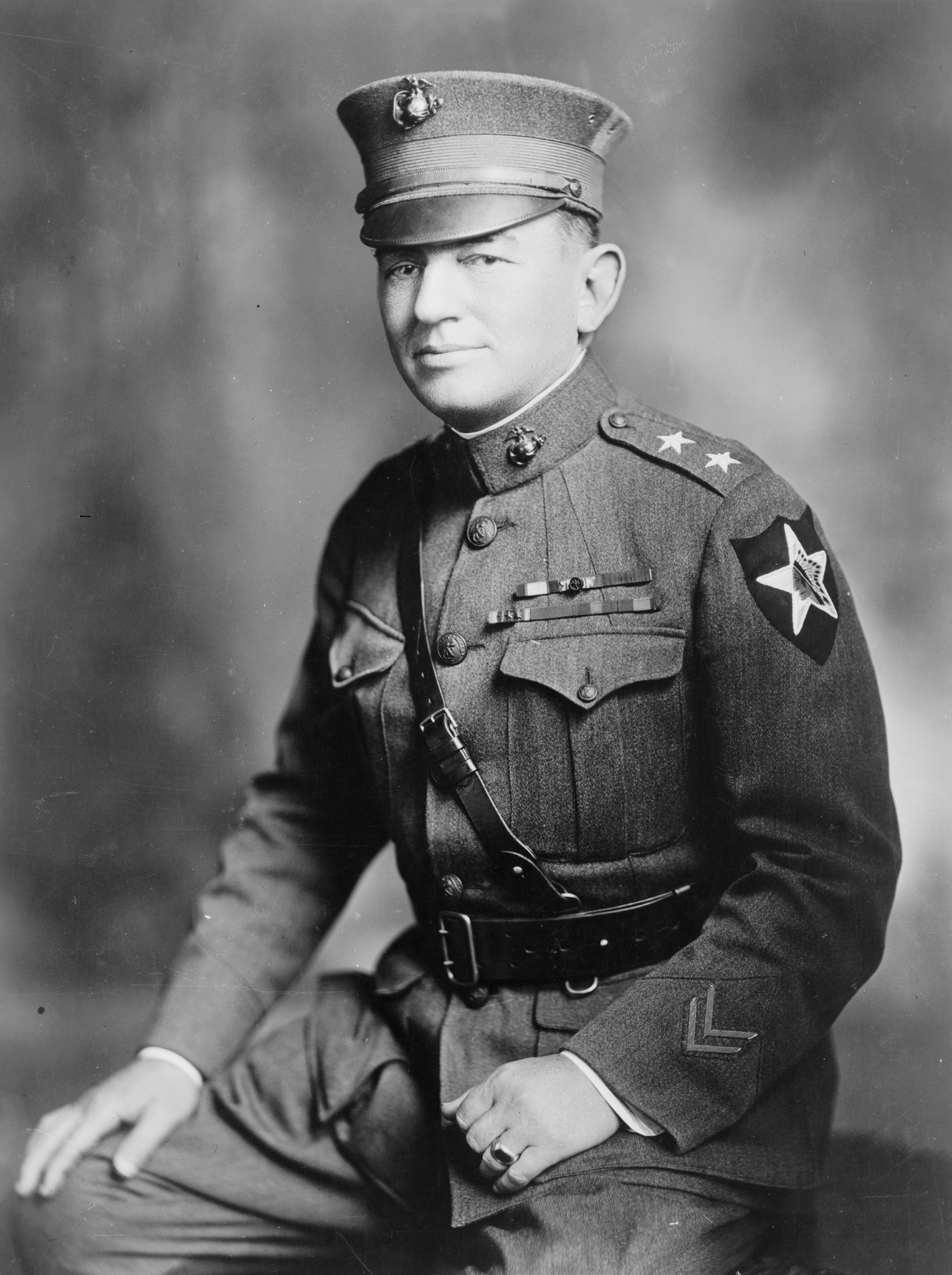
Major General John A. Lejeune, 13th Commandant of the Marine Corps in winter service uniform. Circa 1920.

=== Interwar period ===
A new set of uniform regulations were published for the U.S. Marine Corps in 1922. One of the most notable changes was the elimination of the full dress frock coat with bullion fringe epaulets for officers. The undress blue plain jacket and light blue trousers with the blood stripe became the formal daytime uniform for officers. Generals wore matching dark blue trousers with two inch blood stripe. The former full dress frock coat with epaulets was retained only for the two Marine White House aides.

In 1926, the standing collar on the green wool and khaki cotton service uniforms for both officers and enlisted men was changed to a rolled-flat collar with four buttons down the front. Otherwise, the service coats remained the same The blue dress uniform collars remained standing.

In 1929, the U.S. Marine Corps caps were changed from the bell crown the modern wider crown.

Dress Blues could be worn with a white canvas belt or a leather belt by enlisted men.

The white mess jacket for officers which had been the same closed collar pattern as the blue mess jacket was changed to an open collar peak lapel version.

Officers wore the Sam Browne belt with both the dress blue and green and khaki service uniforms. Enlisted men wore a brown garrison belt over the coat.

In 1936, Marine Corps leather parts of the uniform for officers and enlisted men was also darkened significantly to a cordovan brown shade from the russet lighter brown color similar to the Army shade.

USMC chevrons before 1937 change eliminating rating emblems between the chevrons.

HQMC Circular Letter 205, 19 February 1937 created new enlisted rank insignia for the seven pay grades mandated across the armed forces. The highest pay grade was number one (sergeant major) and the lowest was number seven (private). Multiple titles were used in each grade listed below. Previously chevrons had various occupation ratings between the chevrons. Henceforth, the new chevrons would be standardized, and separate for line and staff NCOs. This was the rank system in effect during WWII.

1st Pay Grade Line, 3 chevrons and 3 rockers. Sergeant Major, Master Gunnery Sergeant.

1st Pay Grade Staff, 3 chevrons and 3 ties. Master Technical Sergeant, Quartermaster Sergeant, Paymaster Sergeant.

2nd Pay Grade Line, 3 chevrons and 2 rockers. First Sergeant, Gunnery Sergeant,

2nd Pay Grade Staff, 3 chevrons and 2 ties. Technical Sergeant, Drum Major, Supply Sergeant.

3rd Pay Grade Line, 3 chevrons and 1 rocker. Platoon Sergeant.

3rd Pay Grade Line, 3 chevrons and 1 tie. Staff Sergeant.

4th Pay Grade 3 chevrons. Sergeant, Mess Sergeant, Chief Cook, Drum Sergeant, Trumpet Sergeant.

5th Pay Grade 2 chevrons. Corporal, Mess Corporal, Field Cook, Drum Corporal, Trumpet Corporal.

6th Pay Grade 1 chevron. Private First Class, Assistant Cooks, Drummers First Class, Trumpeters First Class.

7th Pay Grade 0 chevron. Private, Drummer, Trumpeter.

Also, in 1937, the summer khaki enlisted coat was eliminated.

In 1939, HQMC Circular Letter No. 310 discontinued issue of the Dress Blue uniform except aboard ship. However, enlisted men were permitted to continue to wear uniforms in their possession. The same order ended initial issue of the barracks cover to enlisted men and only issued the garrison cap at recruit depots. Upon reporting for duty, after leaving recruit depots, they could draw headgear worn by organizations to which they're attached. In 1940, HQMC Circular Letter No. 355 resumed issue of the Dress Blue uniforms. Circular 363 named the organizations that would be issued blue uniforms.

"The issue of dress uniforms is restricted to the following: Noncommissioned officers at all posts and stations. All ranks at the following posts and stations.

Marine Barracks, Washington D.C., Marine Barracks, Navy Yard, Washington D.C., New York World's Fair detachment., Marine Detachment, American Embassy, Peiping, China., Fourth Marines, Shanghai, China., Marine Detachment, Tientsin, China., Recruiting., Marine Detachments aboard ship."

Beginning in late 1940, most notably with a prewar deployment to Guantánamo Bay in early 1941, a fiber pith helmet began to replace the campaign hat worn in tropical areas and by recruits in training.

During this period the “alpha” wool green and "alpha" khaki cotton service uniforms were worn not only as the daily garrison uniform but also as field uniforms for winter and summer months respectively.

The winter wool green version was worn extensively in the field in China between the wars and later in Iceland when the 1st Provisional Marine Brigade landed in Iceland in 1941. The summer khaki service uniform was used in the field in hot weather areas often without the coat.

Winston Churchill with U.S. Marines in Iceland 1941. (Note polar Bear patches worn on both sleeves by marines.)

=== World War II ===
During the opening months of America's involvement in WWII, Marines were wearing the khaki service uniform as the summer combat uniform in the Pacific theater. Marines wore khaki during the Pearl Harbor attack, the defense of the Philippines, Wake Island and the battle of Midway. However, by the beginning of the Salomon Islands campaign at Guadalcanal the USMC 1941 pattern utility coat and trousers had come to replace the khaki shirt and trousers as the tropical combat uniform.

The need for a hard wearing utility uniform originated during the interwar period. U.S. Navy denim dungarees and chambray shirts were occasionally issued to Marines (particularly aboard ship) for dirty jobs to preserve the service uniforms. During the 1930s, the Marine Corps began producing mechanics coveralls in a sage green color made from 8.5oz. cotton twill canvass fabric with a herringbone weave (aka Herringbone Twill or HBT fabric). The green coveralls were used for dirty jobs but also began being used for drills and exercises either on top of or in place of the service uniforms to protect them from tears and avoid soiling them. In August 1941, recommendation was made to make a two piece outfit in the same fabric. In December 1941, the "coat and trousers utility" (or "dungarees" in Marine slang) were adopted as a substitute for the HBT coveralls. Uniform collectors today call these the P41, or pattern 1941 HBT uniform.

1941 pattern USMC utility uniform. Front view.

1941 pattern, USMC utility uniform. Rear view.

1941 pattern utility jacket schematic.

1941 utility trousers schematic.

The U.S. Marine Corps version of the two piece HBT utilities differed in design from the U.S. Army version being developed simultaneously the same year. The 1941 model USMC utility jacket buttoned with metal tack buttons embossed with "U.S. Marine Corps". It had three patch pockets, one on the upper left chest and two lower pockets without pocket flaps. The chest pocket was stamped with a stenciled USMC and stenciled eagle globe and anchor logo. Unlike the Army HBTs with tapered legs, 1941 Marine utility trousers were cut with legs wider than the Army version like Navy sailor trousers. The trousers had two slash side pockets and two patch rear pockets.

The 1941 pattern utilities were also made with a camouflage print. More extensive use of camouflage, was made in the Pacific theater due to the jungle environment being more suitable for era patterns, such as the reversible camouflage uniform was issued to some units in 1943.

After much testing and taking opinions from troops the field, the Marine Corps developed a new utility uniform in 1944. The 1944 pattern coat replaced the 1941 three pocket design with two large inset pockets that opened from the inside edge. The notable change on the trousers were large cargo pockets on the trousers legs and also a large pocket on the rear seat.

USMC 1944 pattern utility uniform.

USMC 1944 pattern utility uniform, rear view.

After America's entry into WWII, in early 1942, the issue of the dress blue uniform ceased except for recruiters, ceremonial units around Washington D.C. and the Marine Barracks in London for the duration of the war. However, dress blues were still permitted on leave and liberty by those who already possessed it or those willing to privately purchase the uniform. The only change to the dress blue uniform during the war was a circular letter in 1944 that permitted a blue cloth belt matching the coat material to be worn by officer instead of the Sam Brown belt. That circular did not extend the change to enlisted marines.

The green winter service uniform for officers was worn with the 1935 pattern Sam Browne belt until 1942 when officer's were to provide themselves with a cloth belt of the same material as the coat.

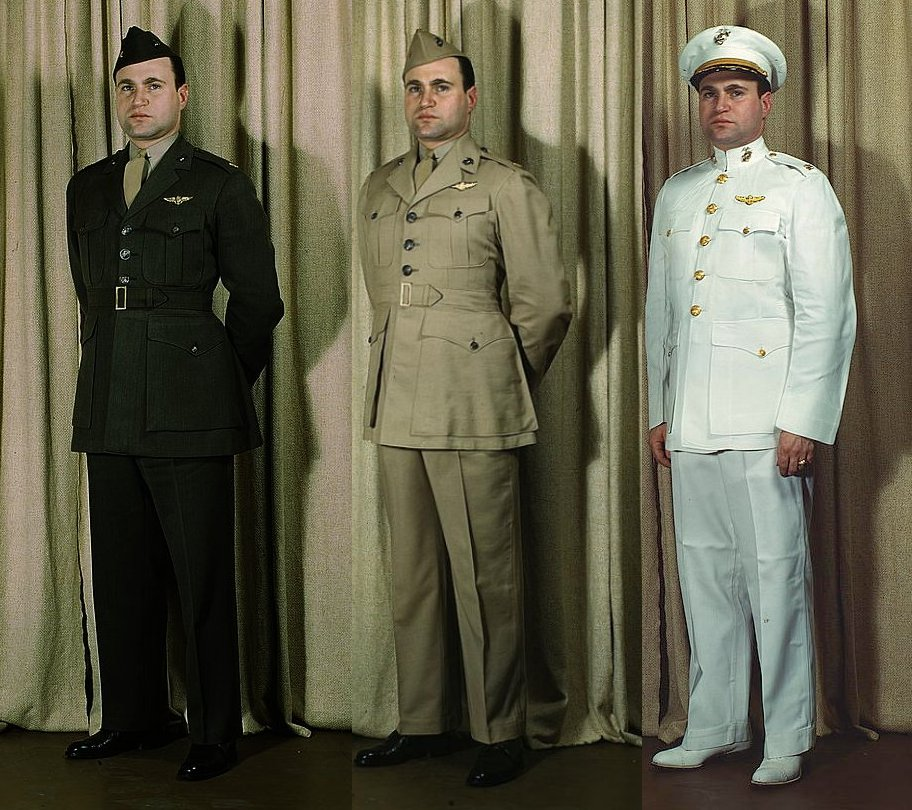
A World War II–era Major in winter service, summer service, & dress white uniforms

The enlisted version of the green service coat was worn with a shell cordovan brown garrison belt at the waist. A common misconception is that the enlisted garrison belt was replaced during the war by a cloth belt at the same time as the change was authorized for officer’s uniforms. That was not the case (observe the photograph of boot camp graduates at Parris Island in November 1945 wearing their initial issue uniforms with the garrison belts). The cordovan garrison belt continued to be issued and remained a required part of the enlisted marine service “alpha” uniform during the war.

Marine Boot Camp Graduates at Parris Island Nov. 1945

When the 1st Marine Division arrived in Melbourne, Australia, in December 1942 they were not equipped with winter clothing having been outfitted for a tropical campaign at Guadalcanal. Earlier the U.S. government used the “reverse lend lease” agreement with the Australian government to have winter wool uniforms made in Australia. The uniforms were made by special contract to American specifications. Part of the uniform produced was a quote “semi British battle jacket”. This was a waist length jacket made of Australian wool similar to British or Commonwealth battle dress but differing in detail. Most notably the jacket had an open collar design and was intended as a substitute for the American 1941 field jacket.

The Corps adopted its own waist length Vandegrift jacket that continued being issued.

The introduction of women into the Corps doubled the number of uniforms, as women had an equivalent for every male uniform.

=== Cold War era ===
In 1946 entirely new patterns of the enlisted dress blue and enlisted service green uniforms were designed. For the first time each had matching fabric belts for enlisted marines.

New 1946 pattern USMC dress blue uniform on the left with old version on the right.

After the war, female uniforms became close to their male equivalents as women were more closely integrated into the Corps, and the green service uniform was worn year-round as the khaki summer version was discontinued.

After the Korean War, khaki utilities were replaced by OG-107 versions, which were in turn replaced in the mid-70s by ERDL pattern uniforms. The Battle Dress Uniform became the standard utilities in the early 1980s, with the woodland and 6-color desert patterns available.

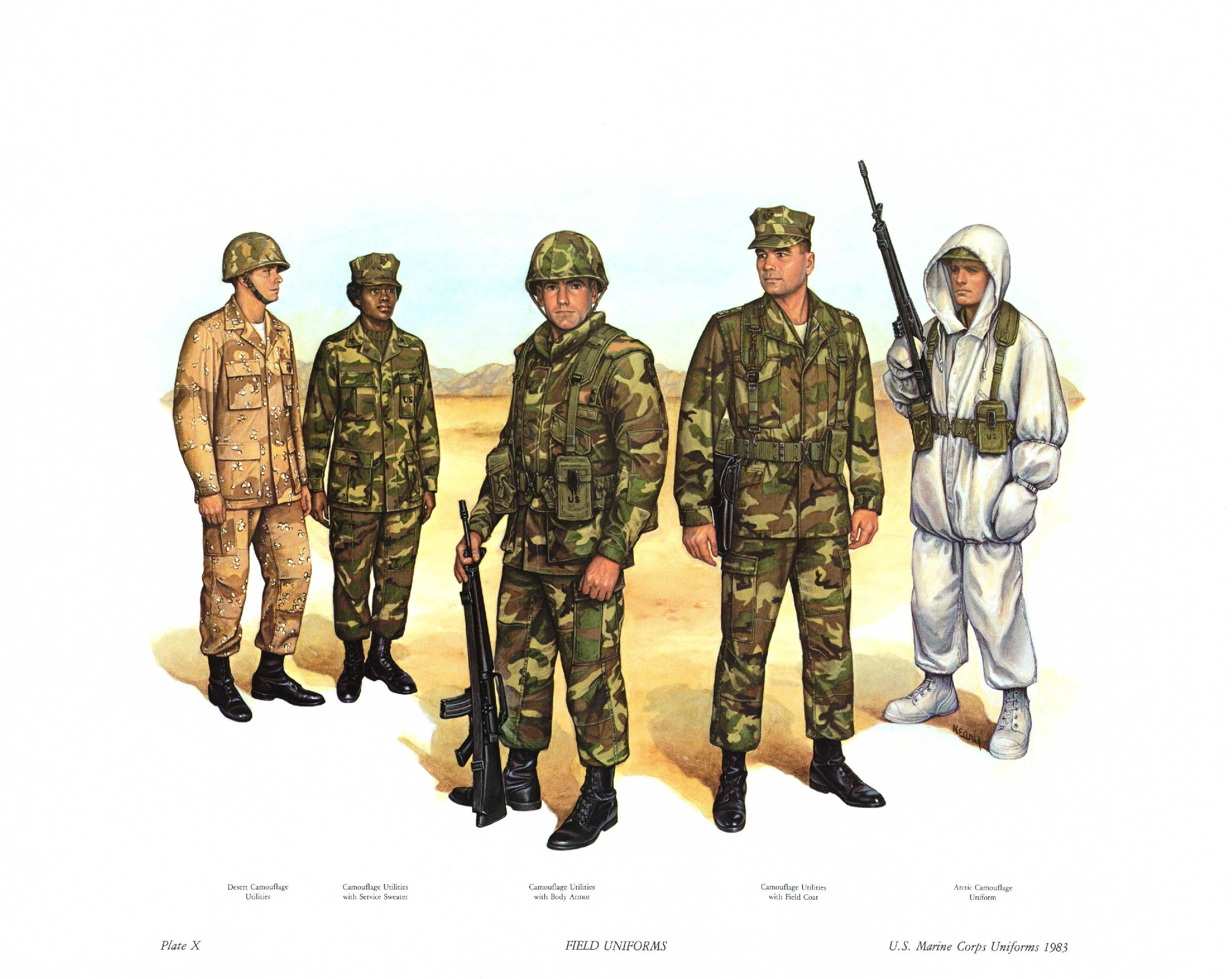
Field uniforms as of 1983: Desert Battle Dress, Camouflage (with service sweater), Camouflage (with utilities and body armor), Camouflage (with field coat), Arctic Camouflage.

In the late 1980s, the full white dress uniform coat was discontinued, though the white dress trousers remain in use as the officer and SNCO summer Blue-white dress and for authorized junior Marines in ceremonies today.

After the Persian Gulf War, nametapes were added to the BDU blouse and the 3-color desert pattern was adopted to address deficiencies, and worn until the MCCUU was adopted in the early 2000s.

Swagger sticks were once in vogue in the Corps, starting as an informal accessory carried by officers in the late 19th century. In 1915, it gained official approval as recruiters were encouraged to carry them to improve public image. This tradition grew when Marines deployed for World War I encountered European officers carrying swagger sticks, leading to an entry in the uniform regulations in 1922 authorizing enlisted Marines to carry them as well. The usage died down in the 1930s and 40s, excepting China Marines, and returned in vogue when a 1952 regulation encouraged them; reaching a peak from 1956 to 1960, when Commandant Randolph M. Pate encouraged use. However, his successor, David M. Shoup, quickly made them optional and discouraged their use. In 1977 then Commandant Gen. Louis H. Wilson issued a directive banning the carrying of them while in uniform.

== Types of uniforms ==
=== Dress uniform ===
The Marine Corps dress uniform is an elaborate uniform worn for formal or ceremonial occasions. Its basic form of a blue jacket with red trim dates back to the 19th century. It is the only U.S. military uniform that incorporates all three colors of the U.S. flag. There are three different variations of the Dress uniform: Evening Dress, Blue Dress, and Blue-White Dress; only officers and staff non-commissioned officers (SNCOs) are authorized to wear the Evening Dress. Until 2000, there was a White Dress uniform, similar in appearance to the U.S. Navy's Dress White uniforms, but worn by officers only (in a manner similar to that of the Dress White uniforms worn in the U.S. Coast Guard). This uniform has since been replaced with the Blue/White Dress uniform for officers and SNCOs.

==== Blue Dress ====
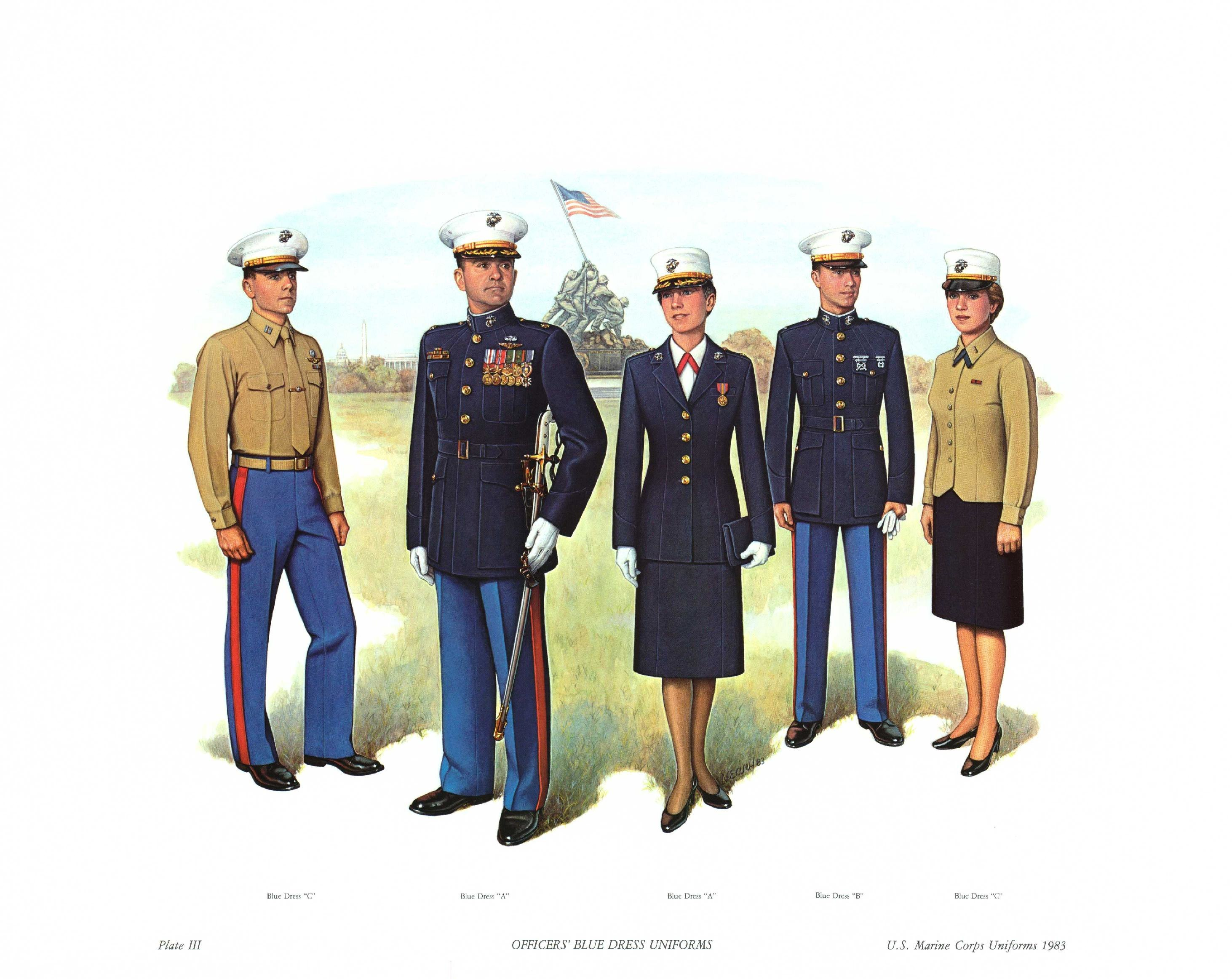
Officer Blue Dress Uniform. From left to right: "C","A","A","B","C". The female "A" uniforms include the since-discontinued open-collar coat, which was superseded by a stand-collar coat in 2018.

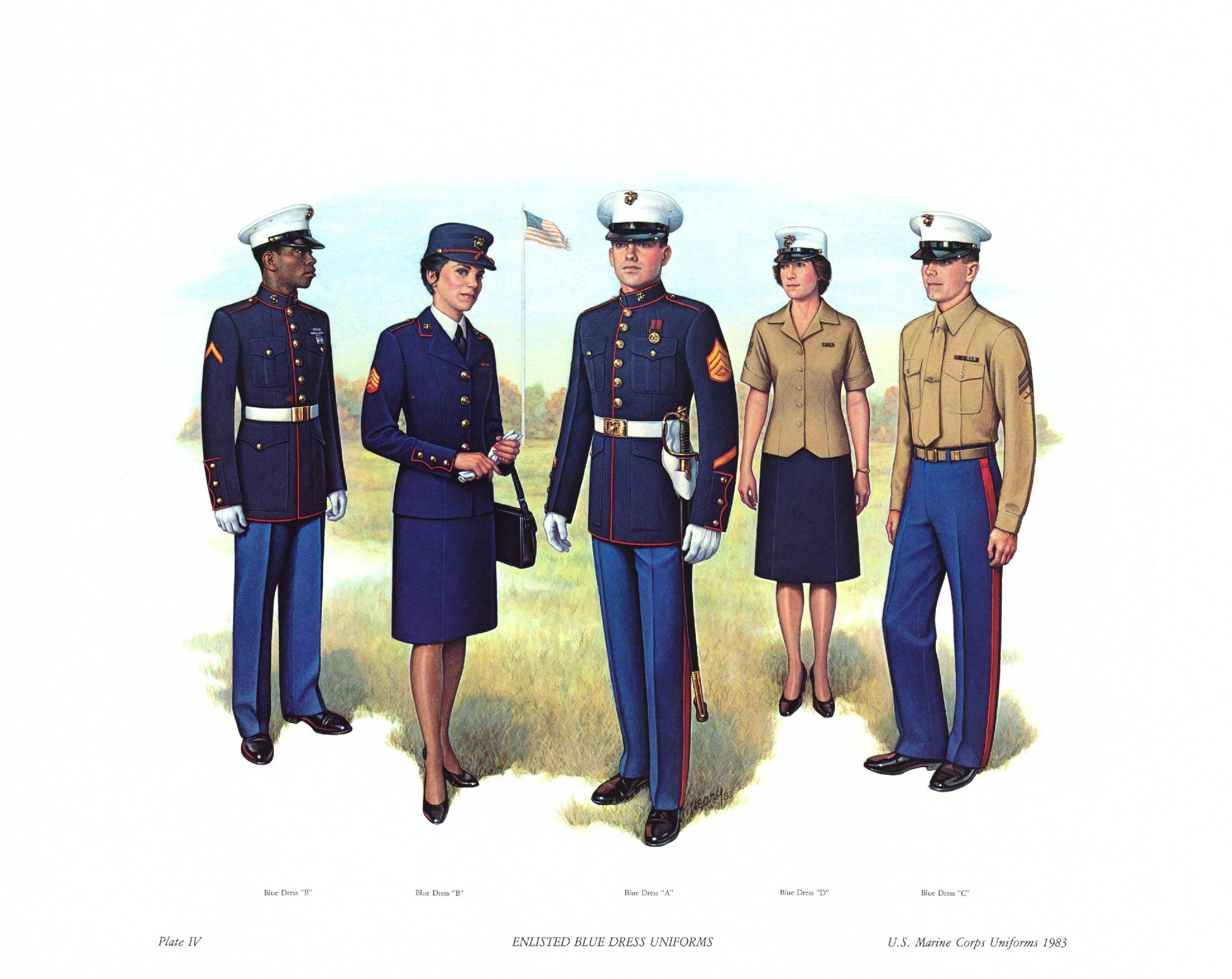
Enlisted Blue Dress Uniform. From left to right: "B","B","A","D","C". As with the officers' uniforms, the Blue Dress uniform for female enlisted Marines has since 2018 featured a stand-collar coat.

The most recognizable uniform of the Marine Corps is the Blue Dress uniform, often seen in recruiting advertisements. It is often called Dress Blues or simply Blues. It is equivalent in formality and use to civilian formal day wear.The various designations are listed in descending order of formality:

- Blue Dress "A" features a midnight blue coat with standing collar. The enlisted version includes seven gilt buttons and red trim and is worn with a white web belt, while officers wear a five-button coat that omits the red trim which is worn with a black Sam Browne belt. All ranks wear a white peaked cap (known as a "barracks cover"), blue trousers, white gloves, and black dress shoes and socks. Officers wear a plain, collarless, white button up shirt with or without French cuffs. Full-sized medals are worn on the left chest, with ribbon-only awards worn on the right, but Marksmanship Qualification Badges are not worn. Women may wear pumps in place of shoes, and may wear a skirt in place of slacks. Prior to 2018, the Blue Dress uniform for female Marines featured an open collar coat worn with a white blouse and neck tab (blue for enlisted, red for officer); it has since been replaced with a new stand collar coat more similar to the one used by male Marines. A blue boatcloak with a scarlet lining is optional.
- Blue Dress "B" is the same as "A", but medals are replaced with their corresponding ribbons and all are consolidated on the left chest. Marksmanship Qualification Badges may be worn.
- Blue Dress "C" is the same as "B", but a khaki long sleeve collared shirt and tie replace the outer blue coat and white gloves. Ribbons and badges are normally worn on the shirt.
- Blue Dress "D" is the same as "C", but with a khaki short sleeve shirt and no tie.

Because the Blue Dress uniform is considered formal wear, Blue Dress "C" and "D" are rarely worn. The main exceptions are Marine recruiters and Marine Security Guards, who wear the "C" and "D" in warm weather, and Marine One pilots in place of a flight suit. Only the "B", "C", and "D" Blue Dress uniforms are authorized for leave and liberty wear; the "A" is not.

General officers wear trousers that are the same color as the coat, while all other ranks wear sky blue trousers. Officers and NCOs wear a scarlet stripe down the outer seam of each leg of the blue trousers. General officers wear a 2 in (5.1 cm) wide stripe, field- and company-grade officers have a 1.5 in (3.8 cm) wide stripe, and NCOs have a 1.125 in (2.86 cm) wide stripe.

A blue crewneck sweater, in the same color shade as that of the trousers, may be worn with the "C" and "D" uniforms, rank insignia is displayed on shoulder epaulettes, officers their respective ranks and anodized brass for enlisted. When wearing the crewneck sweater with the long sleeve khaki shirt, a tie is not required.

==== Blue-White Dress ====
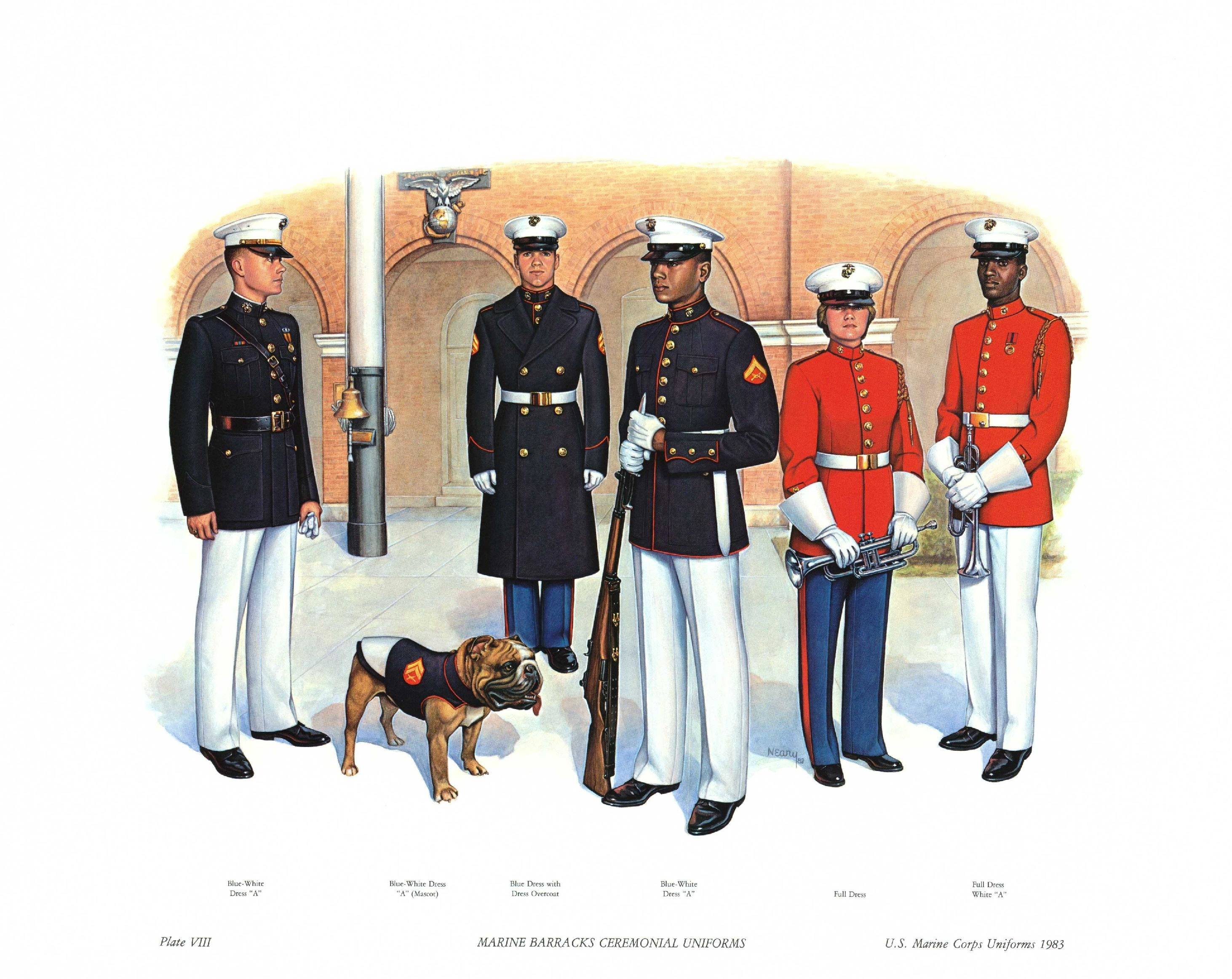
Blue-White and Red Dress Uniforms

The Blue-White Dress uniform is similar to the Blue Dress uniform, except the trousers, skirt, or slacks are white instead of blue, and do not sport scarlet stripes. The white trousers are not authorized for wear with either the long-sleeved or the short-sleeved khaki shirt, precluding the existence of "C" and "D" uniform versions.

Prior to 1998, the "Blue-White" dress uniform was authorized to be worn for the ceremonial units at Marine Barracks, Washington, D.C. (most famously the Silent Drill Platoon and United States Marine Corps Color Guard). Since then, it has become the authorized summer dress uniform for all officers and SNCOs (unless they are in formation with personnel who are not authorized to wear the uniform). NCOs and junior enlisted personnel may only wear white trousers for ceremonies and social events, if authorized and provided by the command structure. This uniform replaced, in 2000, an all-white uniform, similar in appearance to that of the Navy officer's white dress uniform.

==== Red Dress ====
To differentiate themselves from the infantry, musicians—at that time, buglers and signal callers—would reverse the traditional colors. Today members of the ten Marine Corps field bands wear the standard Blue Dress uniforms, while the members of the United States Marine Band (The President's Own) and the United States Marine Drum and Bugle Corps (The Commandant's Own), both based in Washington, D.C., carry on this tradition by wearing the Red Dress uniform, which features a scarlet blouse with blue trim. The Marine Band also wears blue trousers that have a white line bisecting 2 scarlet stripes on each leg.

Like the Blue-White Dress uniform, musicians are not authorized to wear the khaki shirts with the Red-Dress uniform. Should the condition warrant (e.g., summer heat), the band will wear a white shirt with the Blue Dress uniform trousers.

==== Evening Dress ====
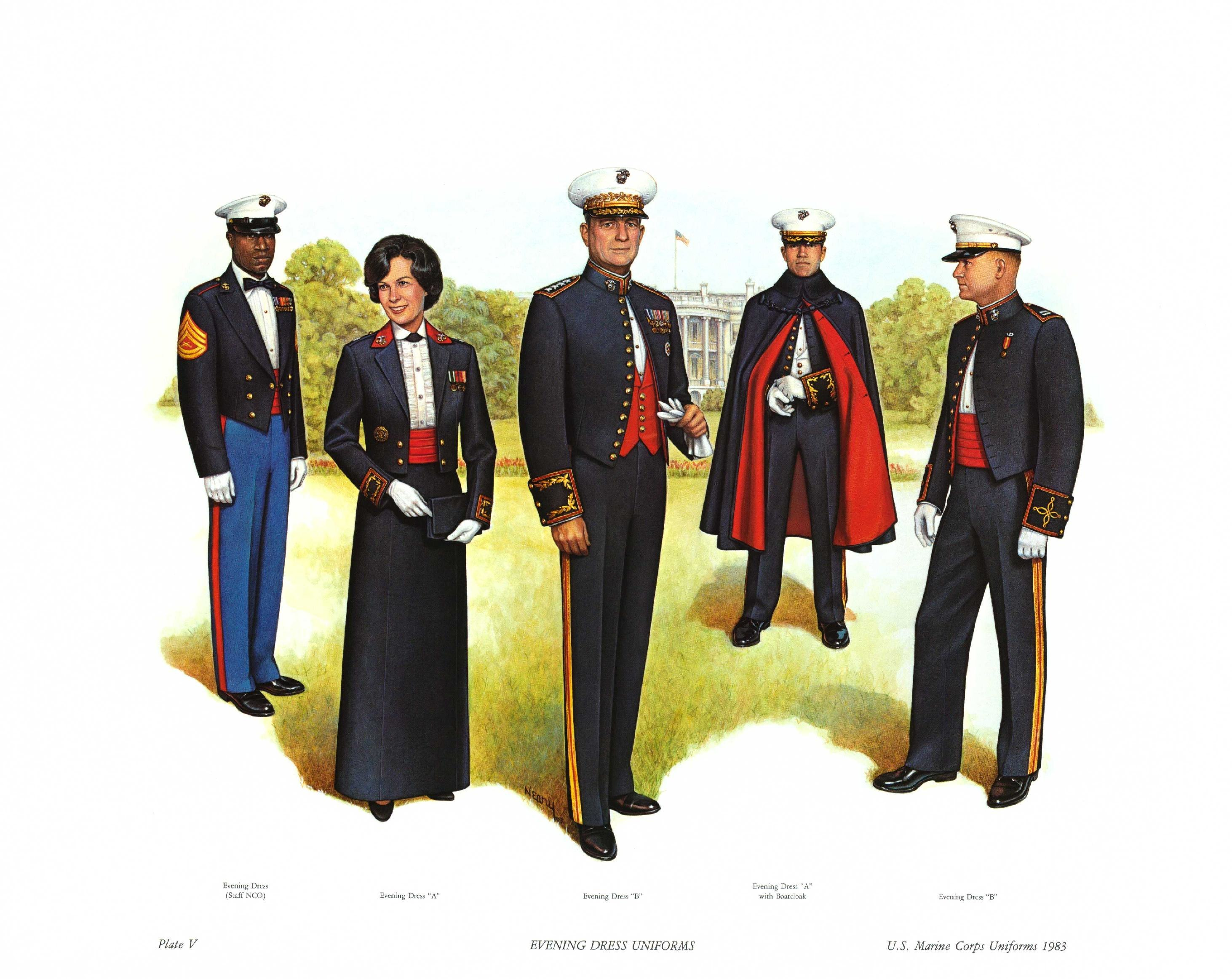
Evening Dress. From left to right: SNCO, "A", "B" (general officer), "A" with boatcloak, "B"

Evening Dress is the most formal (and by U.S. military standards, the most elaborate) of the dress uniforms. Evening Dress A is the equivalent of white tie in usage. Evening Dress B is the equivalent of black tie.It is authorized for wear only by officers and SNCOs, and a required uniform item only for senior officers (majors and above). The three versions are:

- Evening dress "A" For male officers, it consists of an evening coat with sleeve ornamentation, strip collar, white waistcoat, and white shirt with piqué bib. The stripe on the midnight-blue trousers is a thin red stripe inside a gold embroidered stripe. Female officers wear a mess jacket with scarlet collar, a white dress shirt, a red cummerbund, and a long skirt. Miniature medals and badges are worn.
- Evening dress "B" is identical to Evening Dress "A" except men wear a scarlet waistcoat (general officers) or cummerbund (all other officers), and women may wear a short skirt. Miniature medals and badges are worn.
- SNCO Evening Dress Male staff non-commissioned officers wear a semi-formfitting mess jacket with a black bow tie and sky blue trousers. Female SNCOs wear identically the same Evening Dress as female officers, minus the sleeve ornamentation and placement of rank. Both wear the jackets with historic 1890s-era rank insignia sewn on the sleeves. Miniature medals and badges are worn.

A blue boatcloak with a scarlet liner is optional. Junior officers not required to possess Evening Dress may substitute Blue or Blue-White dress "A". It is appropriate for such occasions as state functions, inaugural receptions and dinners, and formal dinners.

=== Service uniform ===
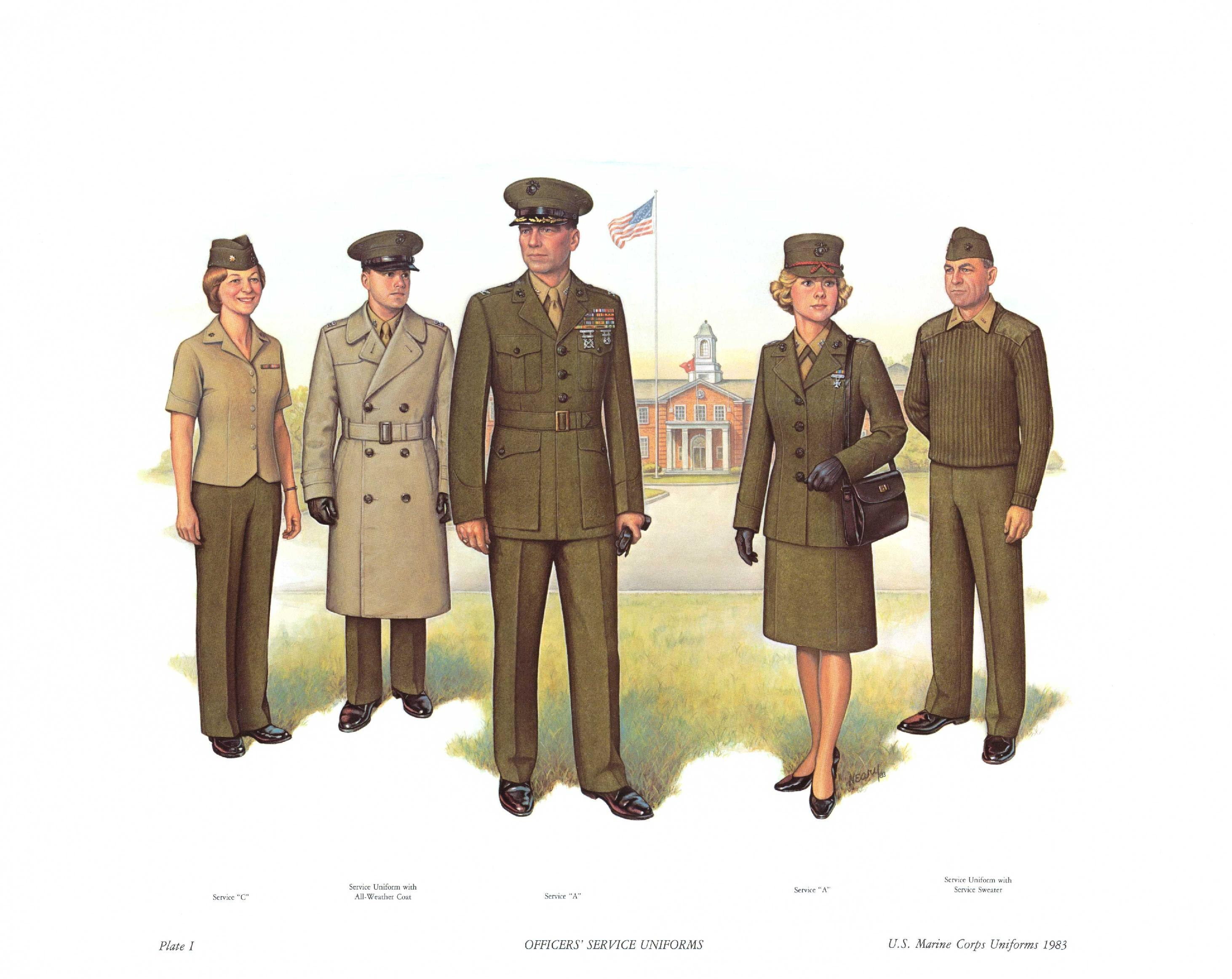
Officer Service Uniform. From left to right:"C", Service with all-weather coat, "A", "A", Service with sweater

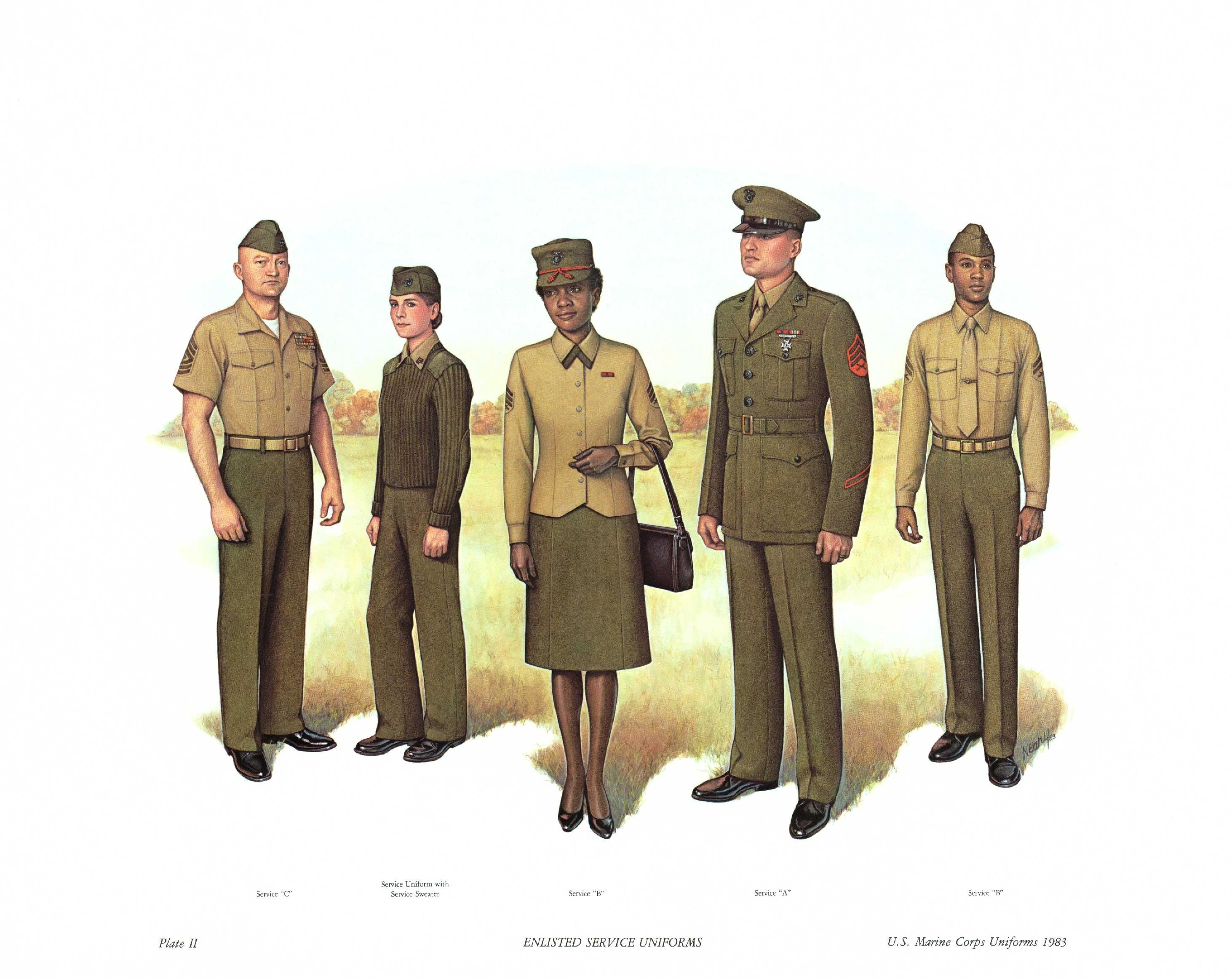
Enlisted Service Uniform. From left to right: "C", Service with sweater, "B", "A", "B"

The service uniform consists of green and khaki colors. The present service uniform of the USMC for enlisted Marines was adopted in 1943 making it the oldest service uniform still in use by the United States armed forces. It is roughly equivalent in formality and function to a business suit.

It is the prescribed uniform when:

- serving on a court-martial
- attending appearance in criminal court (off installations).
- making official visits and calls on U.S. and foreign dignitaries, officials, and military officers.
- visiting the White House, except when in a tourist capacity, or on an occasion where another uniform is specified.
- reporting for duty onshore

Like the Blue Dress uniform, the service uniform is authorized for wear while on leave or liberty.

The service uniforms are designated:

- Service "A" (or Alpha) is the base uniform. It consists of a green coat, green trousers with khaki web belt, khaki long-sleeve button-up shirt, khaki tie, tie clasp, and black shoes. The coat is cut to be semi-form fitting, with ribbons and marksmanship badges worn on the left chest of the coat. Women wear a green necktab in place of the tie, pumps instead of shoes, and have the option of wearing a skirt instead of slacks. It is sometimes appropriate to remove the jacket while indoors.
- Service "B" (or Bravo) is identical to the "A" except the coat is removed. Ribbons may be worn on the shirt.
- Service "C" (or Charlie) is identical to the "B" except with a short-sleeve button-up shirt and no tie.

There are two types of authorized headwear for the service uniform. Both men and women may wear the green soft garrison cap, sometimes nicknamed a "piss cutter". There is the option of wearing a peaked cap (called a barracks cover). The design of these covers had differed between women and men. However, in late 2013, the Commandant of the Marine Corps approved the Marine Corps Uniform Board's recommendation to adopt the male dress and service cap as the universal dress and service cap for all Marines, male and female. As on the Blue Dress uniform, officers wear rank insignia on the shoulder epaulettes of their jackets and the collars of their shirts, while enlisted personnel wear rank insignia sewn on their sleeves.

A green crewneck sweater (originally adopted from British Army and Royal Marines issue) in the same color shade as that of the trousers may be worn with the "B" and "C" uniforms. When wearing the crewneck sweater with the long sleeve khaki shirt, a tie is not required.

=== Utility uniform ===
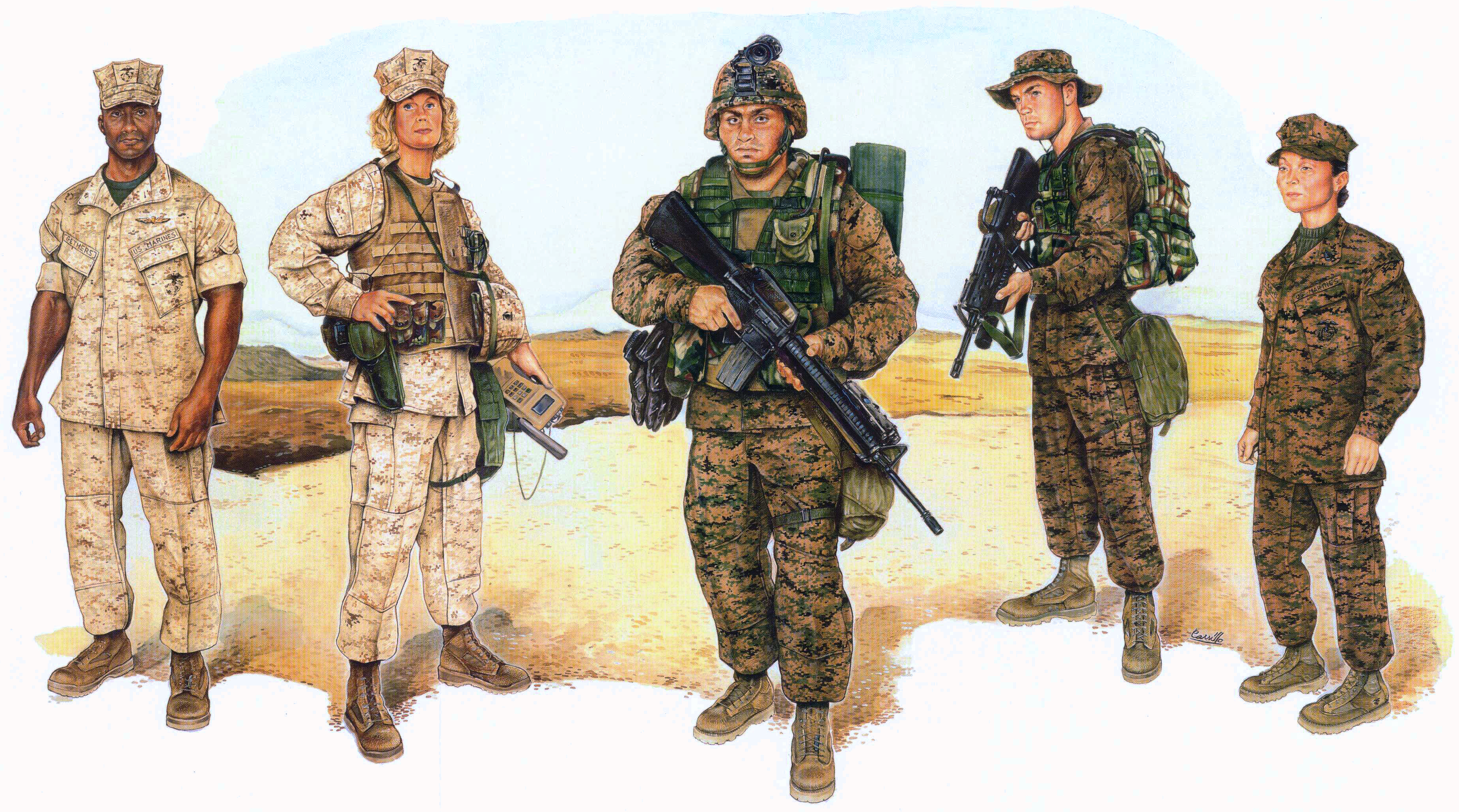
A 2003 drawing depicting U.S. Marines wearing the Marine Corps Combat Utility Uniform in desert and woodland-camouflaged variants.

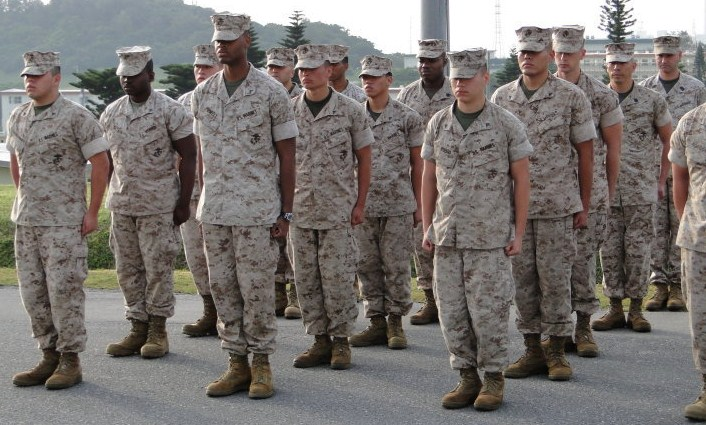
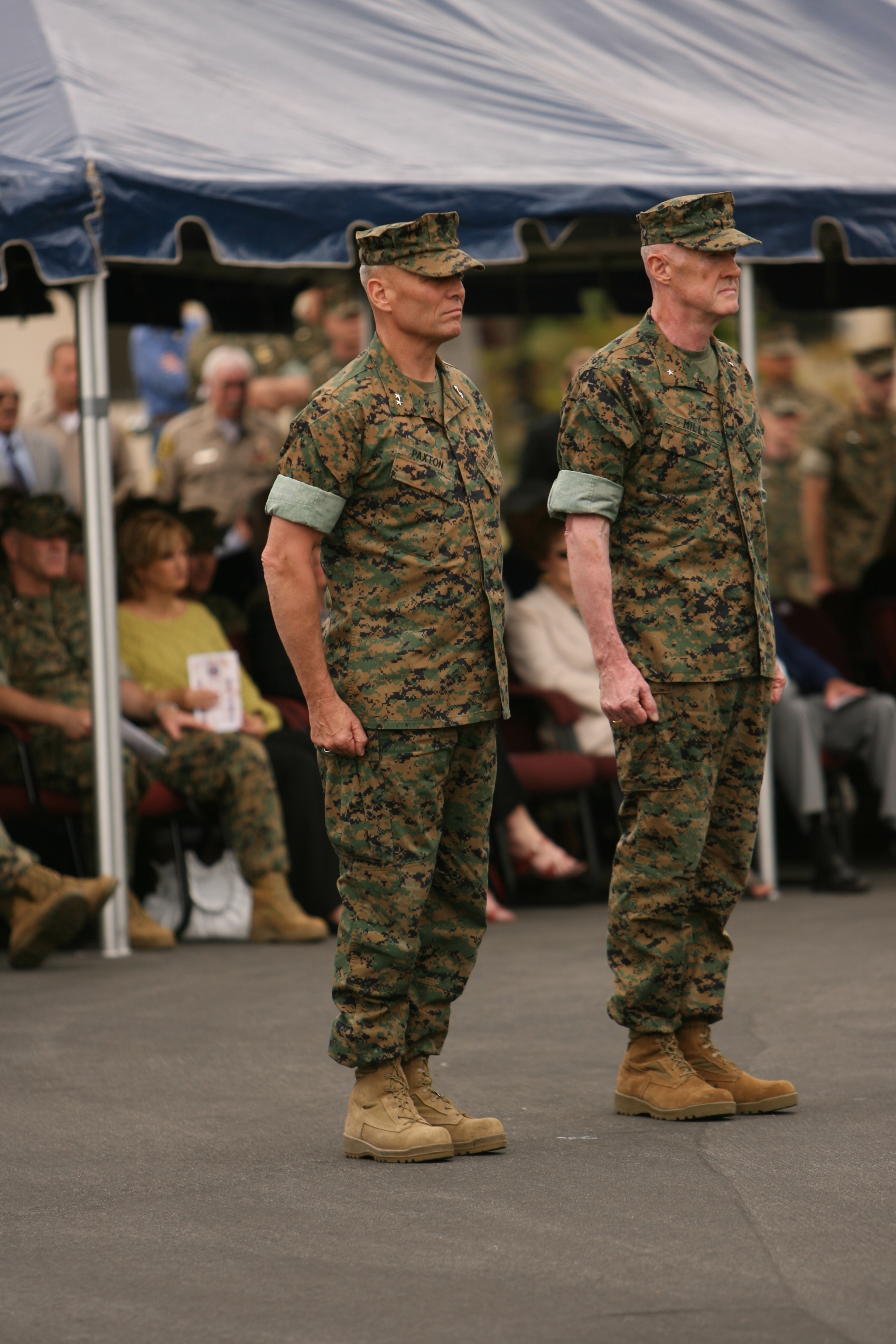
U.S. Marines wearing the MCCUU in garrison, with sleeves rolled and utility covers
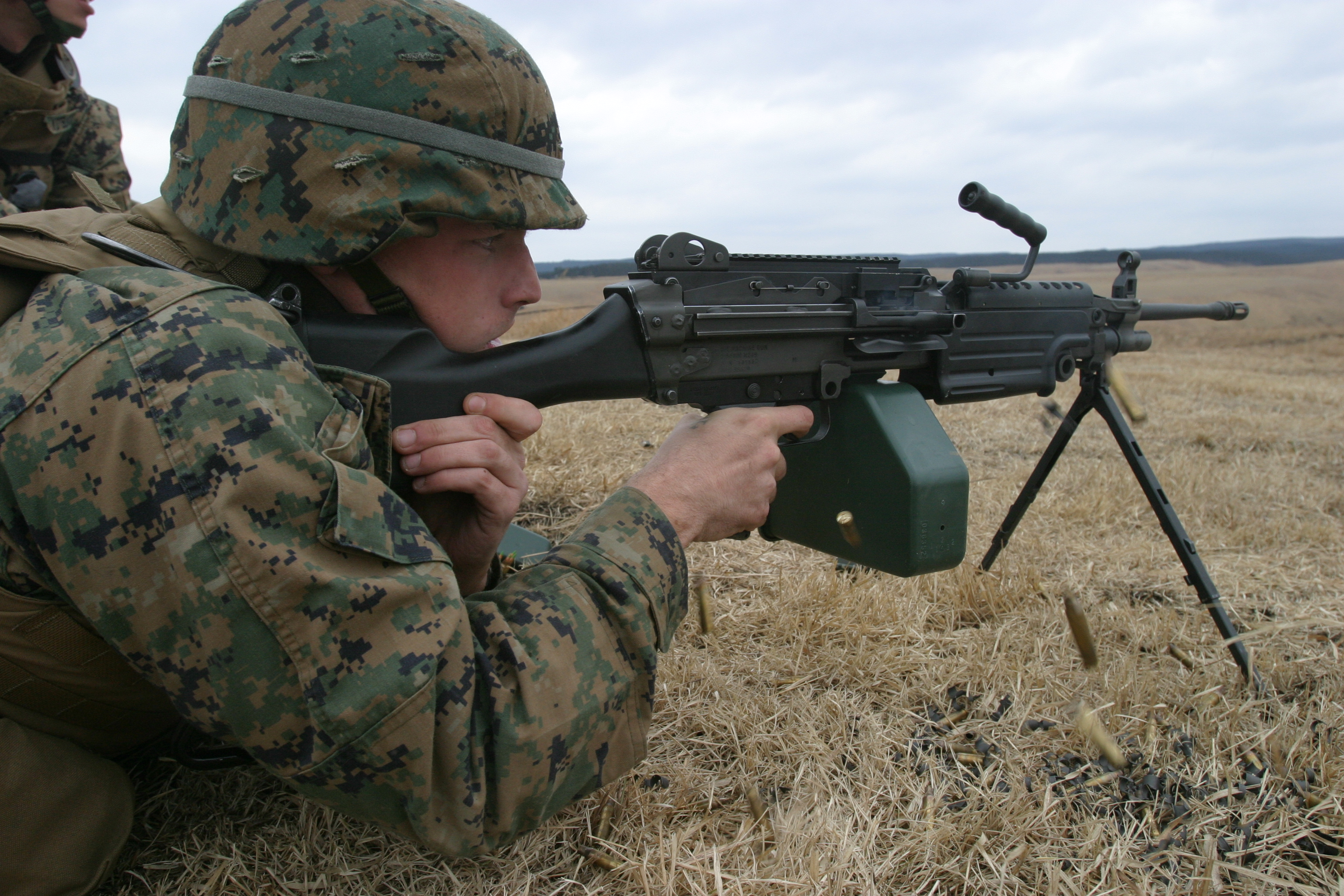
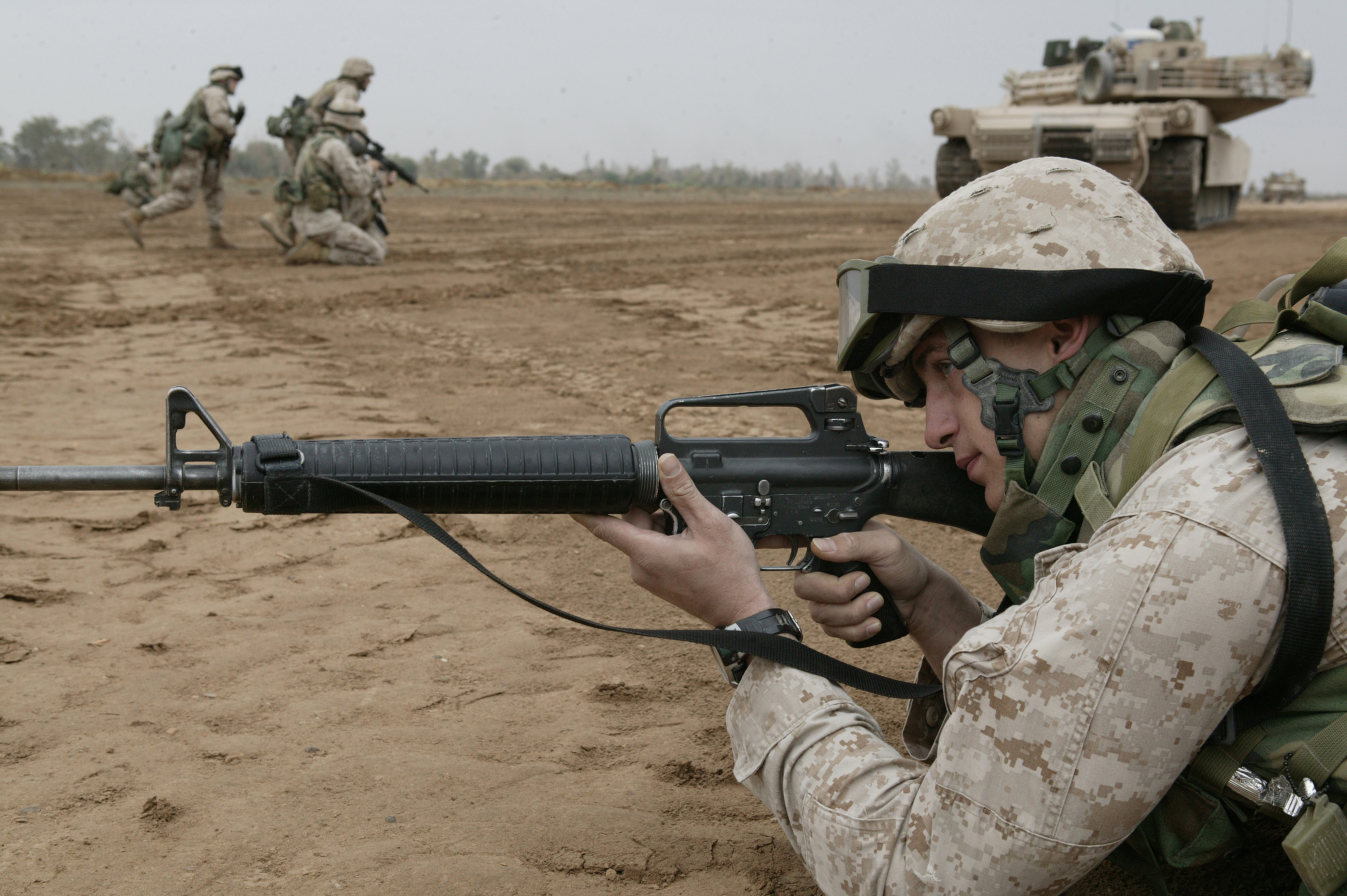
U.S. Marines wearing the MCCUU with combat equipment

The Marine Corps Combat Utility Uniform or MCCUU is intended for wear in the field or for working parties but has become the typical working uniform for all deployed and most garrison Marines and Sailors. Previously, Marines wore the same utility uniforms as the Army. Unlike the dress and service uniforms, utility uniforms are not permitted for wear on leave or liberty (i.e., while off-duty), except when traveling in a vehicle between a place of duty and a residence, or in emergency stops.

The uniform consists of a camouflage blouse and trousers, green undershirt, and tan (specifically "olive mojave") suede boots. The uniform uses MARPAT digital camouflage patterns, of which there are two approved varieties. The first is a four-color woodland pattern in green, tan, brown, and black, while the other is a three-color desert pattern in tan, brown, and grey. Both officers and enlisted Marines wear pin-on rank insignia on each collar point. Enlisted insignia is always black, while officers wear bright metal insignia in garrison and subdued insignia in the field. Most badges and breast insignia are authorized for wear on the utility uniform, shined or subdued as appropriate.

The variety worn depends on the environment; deployed Marines wear whichever color is more appropriate to the climate and terrain. The desert MCCUU is only worn in appropriate field environments. During the summer months, Marines in garrison will roll the sleeves of the woodland blouse, tightly folded up to the biceps, exposing the lighter inside layer, and forming a neat cuff to present a crisper appearance to the otherwise formless uniform. In the past, when Marines wore the same utilities as the Army and Air Force, this served to distinguish them from the other branches, who folded the sleeves in with the camo facing out. In Haiti, the practice earned them the nickname "whitesleeves".

The approved headwear is the utility cover, an eight-pointed brimmed hat that is worn "blocked", that is, creased and peaked. In the field, a boonie cover is also authorized. The trouser legs are "bloused", or the cuffs are rolled inside and tightened over their boots with a spring or elastic band known as a "boot band" or "blousing garter". With the introduction of the Marine Corps Martial Arts Program (MCMAP), Marines now wear a color-coded MCMAP belt or rigger instead of the old web belt, indicating their level of proficiency in MCMAP (the web belt was phased out in 2008 due to a requirement for all Marines to achieve a tan belt rank by then).

In combat, Marines will also wear one of two ballistic vests: the Outer Tactical Vest and the newer Modular Tactical Vest, as well as the Lightweight Helmet (replacing the PASGT helmet) and improved load-bearing equipment. Marines in a combat area may also wear Flame Resistant Organizational Gear, or FROG uniforms. These combat uniforms are designed to reduce fire-related injuries, and look quite similar to the MCCUU. Other individual equipment may be worn as directed.

=== Physical training uniform ===
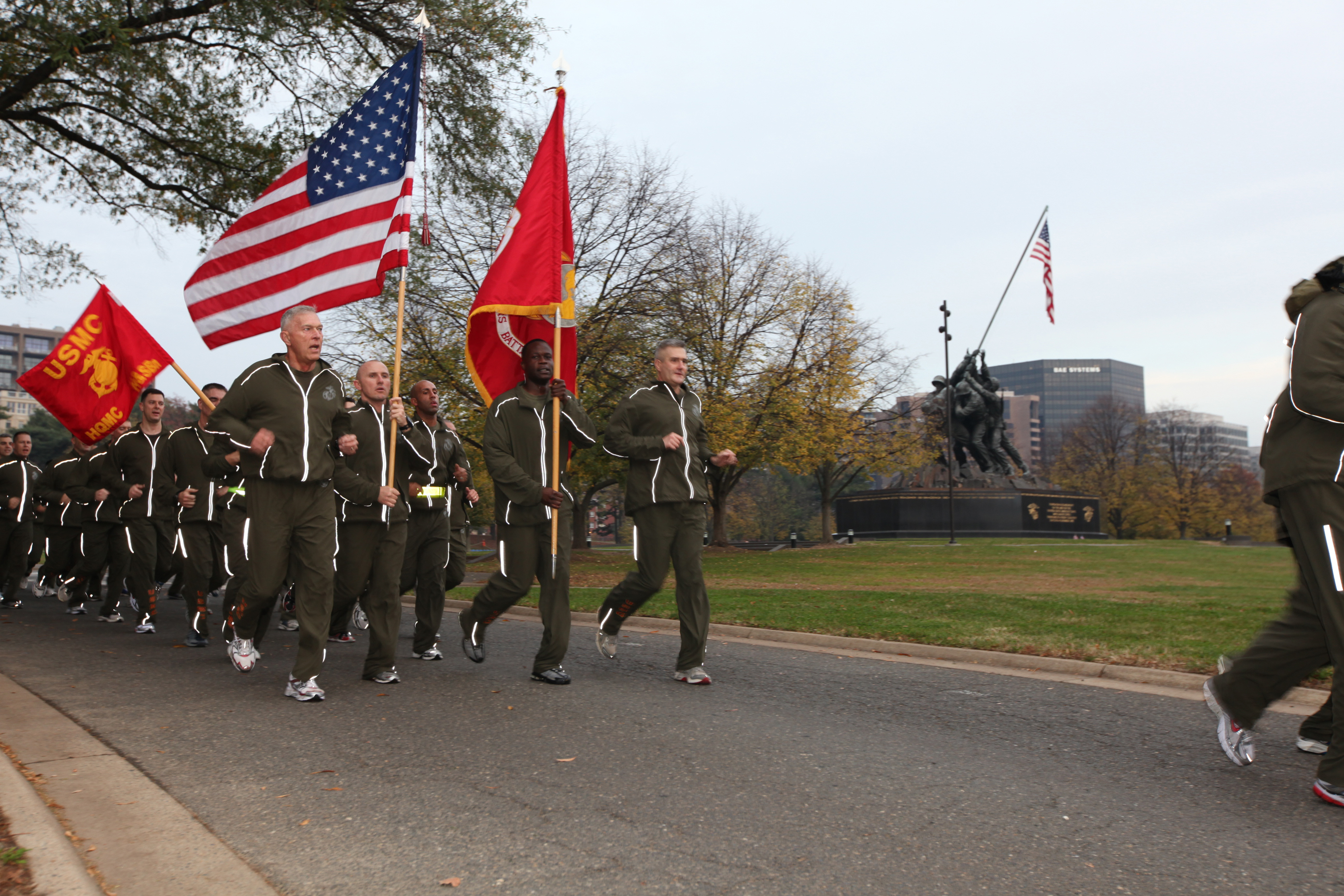
The 34th Commandant leading a unit run wearing the PT tracksuit on the Marine Corps birthday

The physical training uniform consists of the following:

- Plain olive-drab green nylon shorts and polyester T-shirt (shirts with unit logos can be authorized)
- OD green sweats with the Marine Corps emblem printed in black on the left chest of sweatshirt and thigh of sweatpants
- OD green tracksuit with reflective piping, reflective Marines emblem on the left chest of jacket and on the upper right leg of pants, "Marines" lettering in scarlet with yellow lining on back of jacket and USMC lettering in the same design on the lower right leg of pants. It was unveiled during a tour of Iraq in December 2007 by former Commandant of the Marine Corps General James Conway, and was released in February 2008.

In addition, Marines can wear a watch cap and gloves in cold weather, or a hydration pack to prevent dehydration.

=== Miscellaneous uniform items ===
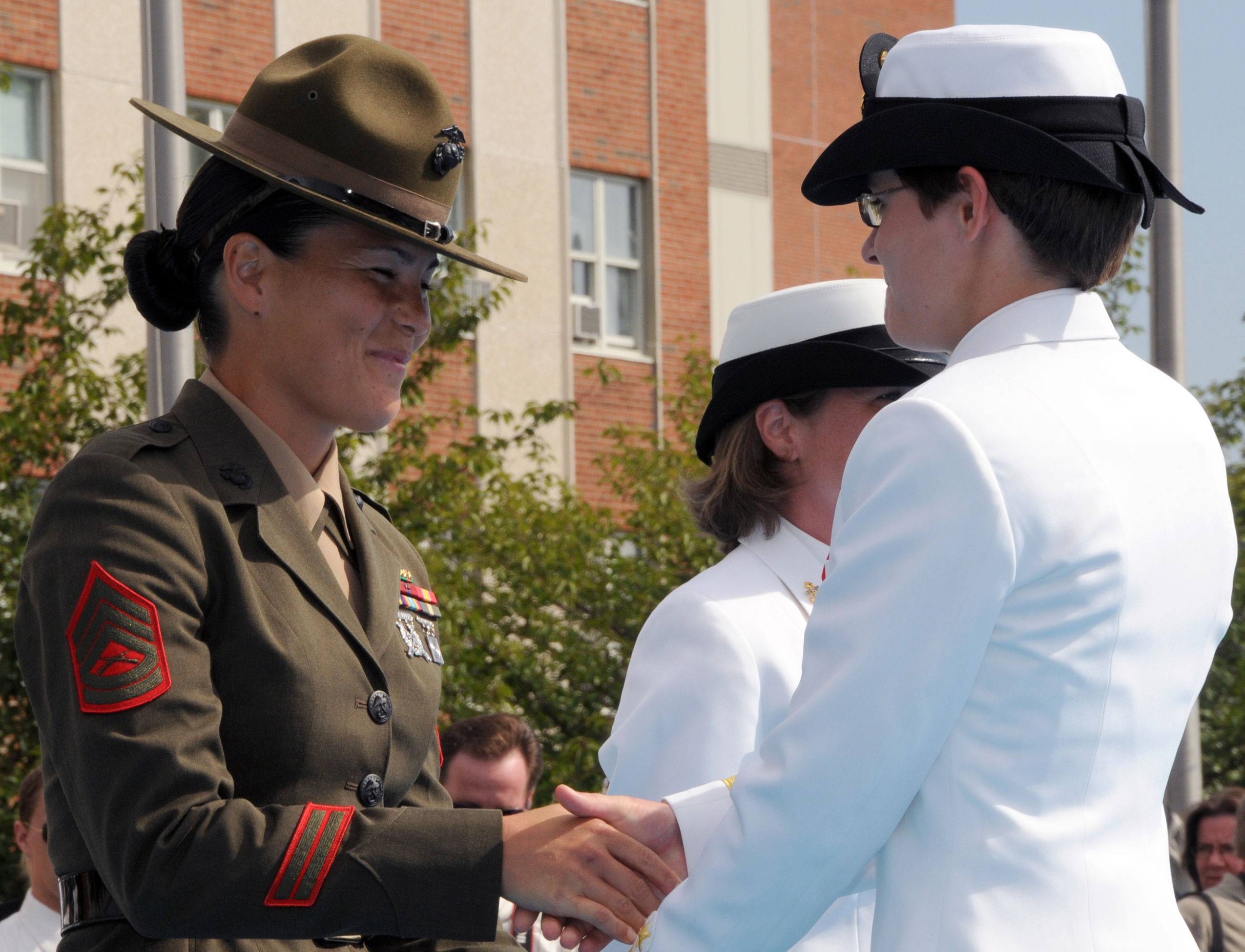
A drill instructor (left) wears the campaign cover

The following items may be worn at the individual's discretion, except when in formation, ceremony, inspection, or when the commander decrees that uniformity is required:

- Grey all-weather coat (which is a double-breasted trenchcoat with removable liner) is authorized for wear with all uniforms during inclement and cold weather (ceremonial units at Marine Barracks, 8th&I have their own special Dress-blue trenchcoat with red piping).
- Dress Blue Wool greatcoat, (double breasted with gold buttons), is used only with the Dress Blue uniform
- Blue boatcloak (Males) or Blue Dress Cape (females) with a scarlet lining is optional for use by officers, warrant officers, and SNCO's only on Evening Dress and Dress Blue uniforms.
- Grey tanker jacket is authorized with the Dress "C" and "D" and Service "B" and "C" except when the all-weather coat is worn.
- Green service sweater may be worn with the MCCUU (but only with and under the blouse).
- Gloves may be worn at the individual's discretion except when uniformity is required such as in a formation ceremony (white for Dress, black for Service, black or olive green for Utilities).
- Olive green undershirt with a unit insignia or other design may be worn in lieu of a plain olive green undershirt for the MCCUU or with the PT uniform (a custom shirt will not be mandatory unless provided without cost to the individual).
- Purses may be worn or carried by females only, while umbrellas can be used by both males and females (when appropriate in dress or service uniforms) and must be black and plain.
- Female Marines may wear the Service or Utility maternity uniforms when the standard items will no longer fit. There is no maternity dress uniform, while the maternity MCCUU comes in both woodland and desert patterns.
- Various organizational clothing items may be worn with the utility uniform during inclement or cold weather, to include the All Purpose Environmental Clothing System (APECS) parka and trousers, the Combat Desert Jacket, or rain poncho.
- Plain black and white plastic name tags may be worn above the right breast pocket of the dress and service uniforms only when mandated by the commanding officer. This is usually seen by instructors at schools or conferences, by recruiters, and by drill instructors or NROTC advisors.
- Drill instructors and certain range personnel (such as Primary Marksmanship Instructors) wear the campaign cover with the service and utility uniforms when they are in an instructing billet, such as at recruit training or related activities.
- Primary Marksmanship Coaches wear the American fiber helmet with the utility uniforms.

Working uniforms will be worn when the individual's duties require, to include coveralls, flight suits, cooking uniforms, and other safety clothing like goggles, gloves, or aprons.

== Insignia, rank, and other accoutrements ==
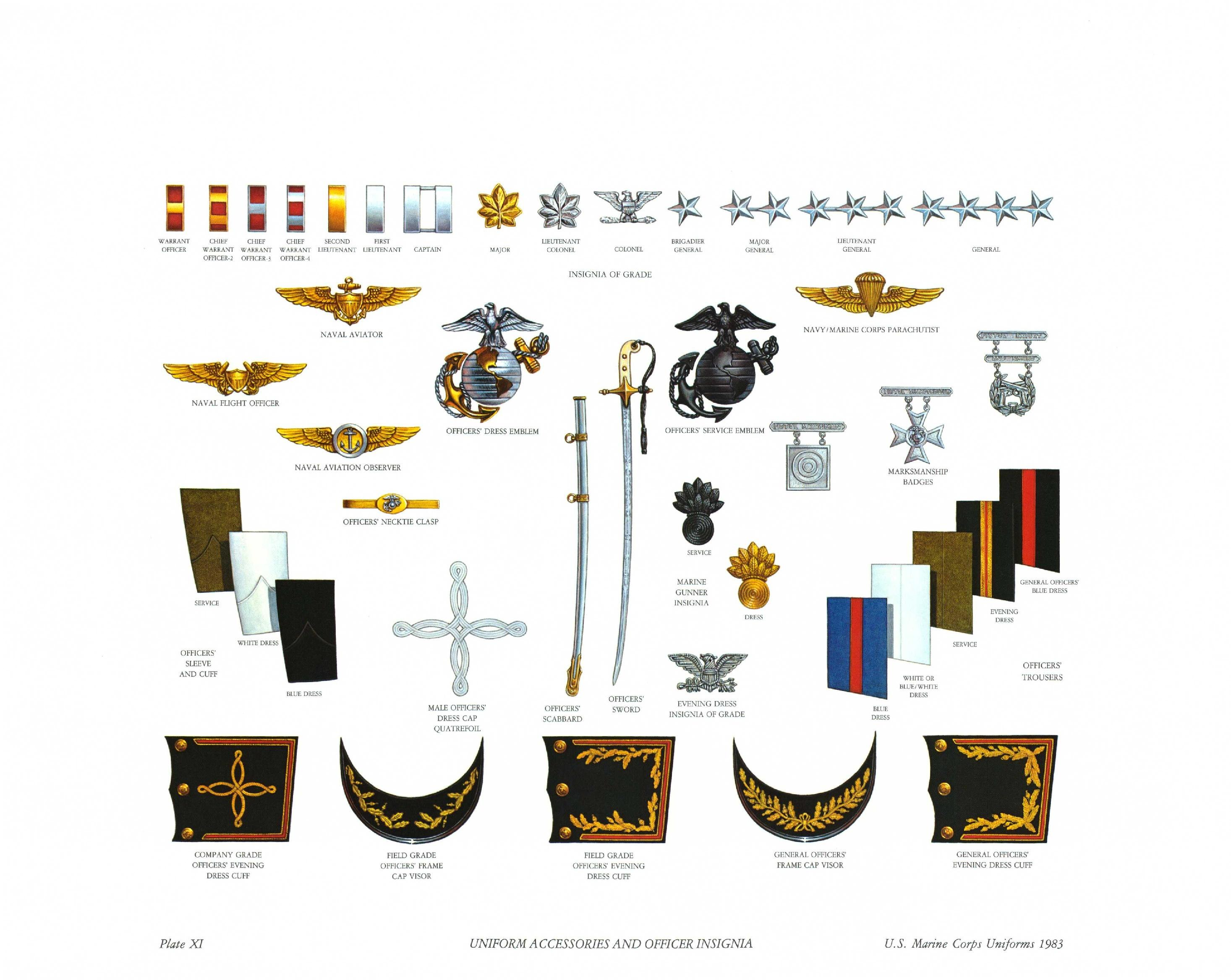
Officer uniform insignia

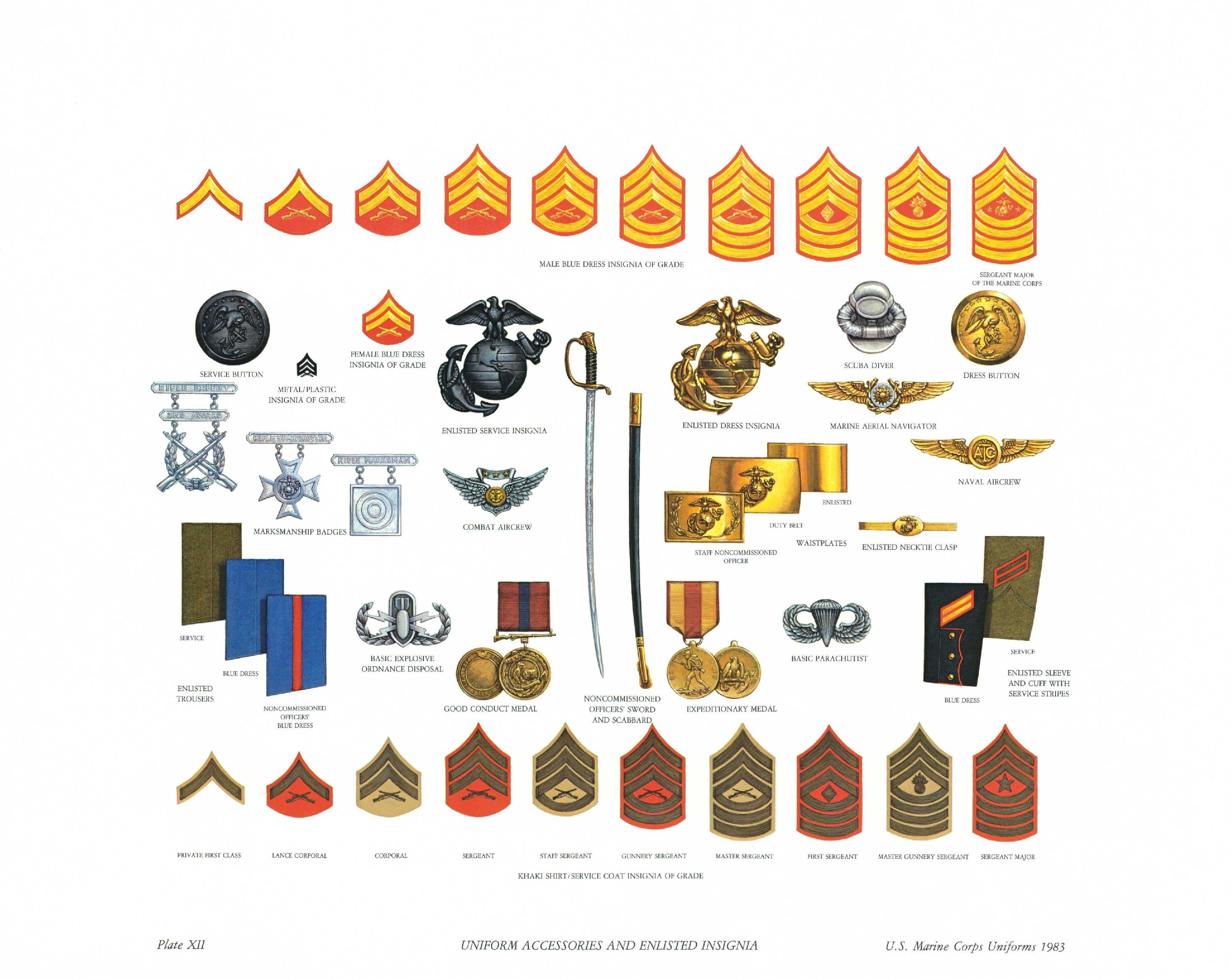
Enlisted uniform insignia

Like any uniform, Marine uniforms have many accoutrements whose symbolism may not be obvious. One of the most notable adornments is the Eagle, Globe, and Anchor, found in some manner on most uniforms; it is even within the MARPAT digital camouflage pattern. It is also the standard cap badge for all uniform covers. An older insignia, progenitor to the Eagle, Globe, and Anchor can be seen in modern dress and service coat buttons.

The "blood stripe" is found on the outside seams of the dress uniform trousers of NCOs, SNCOs, and officers. Tradition holds that it represents the high casualty rates of those leaders during the Battle of Chapultepec. Officers wearing the Evening Dress uniform also have additional gold trim on the trouser stripe.

Various uniforms display rank insignia differently. Enlisted Marines will wear chevrons on the sleeves of all uniforms but the Utility and other working uniforms: gold stripes on red for the Dress coat, green stripes on red for the service coat, green stripes on khaki for the khaki short and long sleeve shirts, and black metal or plastic pin-on insignia on the collar of the utility and other working uniforms and the all-weather coat. The same insignia is pinned on the epaulettes of the wool sweaters and tanker jacket. Officers will wear large insignia on the epaulettes of dress, evening dress, and service coats as well as sweaters and tanker jacket; smaller insignia is worn on the collar of all other uniforms (officers in a combat environment may wear subdued insignia, where flat black replaces silver and flat brown replaces gold). Chief Warrant Officers who are designated "Infantry Weapons Officer" with an MOS of 0306 (also known as "Marine Gunner") (or historically those in a combat arms MOS, which included artillery and communications among others during the Korean War era) replace their left insignia with a gold or black bursting bomb. Navy personnel authorized to wear Marine uniforms wear their assigned rate. Musicians in the United States Marine Band replace the crossed rifle in their insignia with lyres to denote their non-combat role.

Marines wear awards in several ways. Large medals are authorized only on the Dress "A" uniform, while awards for which no medal was struck will have ribbons mounted on the opposite pocket. Miniature medals are worn on the Evening Dress uniform, and are authorized for wear with civilian tuxedos when appropriate to the event. Other dress and service uniforms are worn with ribbons and weapon qualification badges, though the unit commander may decide to forgo the latter. Breast insignia, also known as badges, are similarly worn, though individuals have the option of wearing subdued insignia on the utility uniform.

The buttons on the dress and service coats are reminiscent of Marine insignia prior to the adoption of the Eagle, Globe, and Anchor. The quatrefoil—the cross-shaped braid worn atop an officer's cover—is a distinguishing part of the Marine officer's uniform. The design is of French origin, and is a tradition from the pre-Civil War era when officers wore a rope cross on their caps to allow sharpshooters high in the rigging of a sailing ship to identify his allies in a battle. Enlisted Marines wear service stripes on the cuff of the dress and service coats, each stripe denoting four years of service as a Marine. The standing collar of the dress coat is reminiscent of the uniform that earned Marines the nickname "Leatherneck".

Green cartridge belts or brassards can be worn by personnel in an authoritative or ceremonial duty status (such as drill instructors or fire watch sentries, wearing such items regards the individuals as "under arms" whether they are actually carrying a weapon or not. As such, they do not uncover indoors. During ceremonies, officers have the option of wearing a Sam Browne belt and the Mameluke sword, and Noncommissioned Officers may wear the NCO sword. The current Mameluke sword is modeled on the sword presented to First Lieutenant Presley O'Bannon by the Ottoman Empire viceroy, Prince Hamet, in 1804, during the First Barbary War, as a gesture of respect and praise for the Marines' actions at the Battle of Derne.

Members of the 5th and 6th Marine Regiments wear the French Fourragère to represent the multiple awards of the Croix de Guerre by the French government in World War I.

== Wear by Navy personnel ==
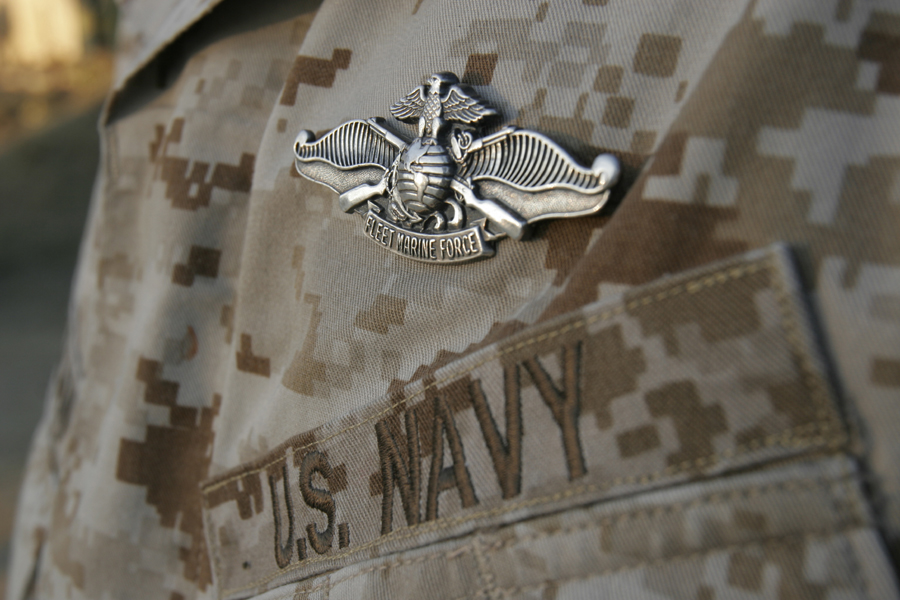
A navy sailor wears the MCCUU with Fleet Marine Force insignia

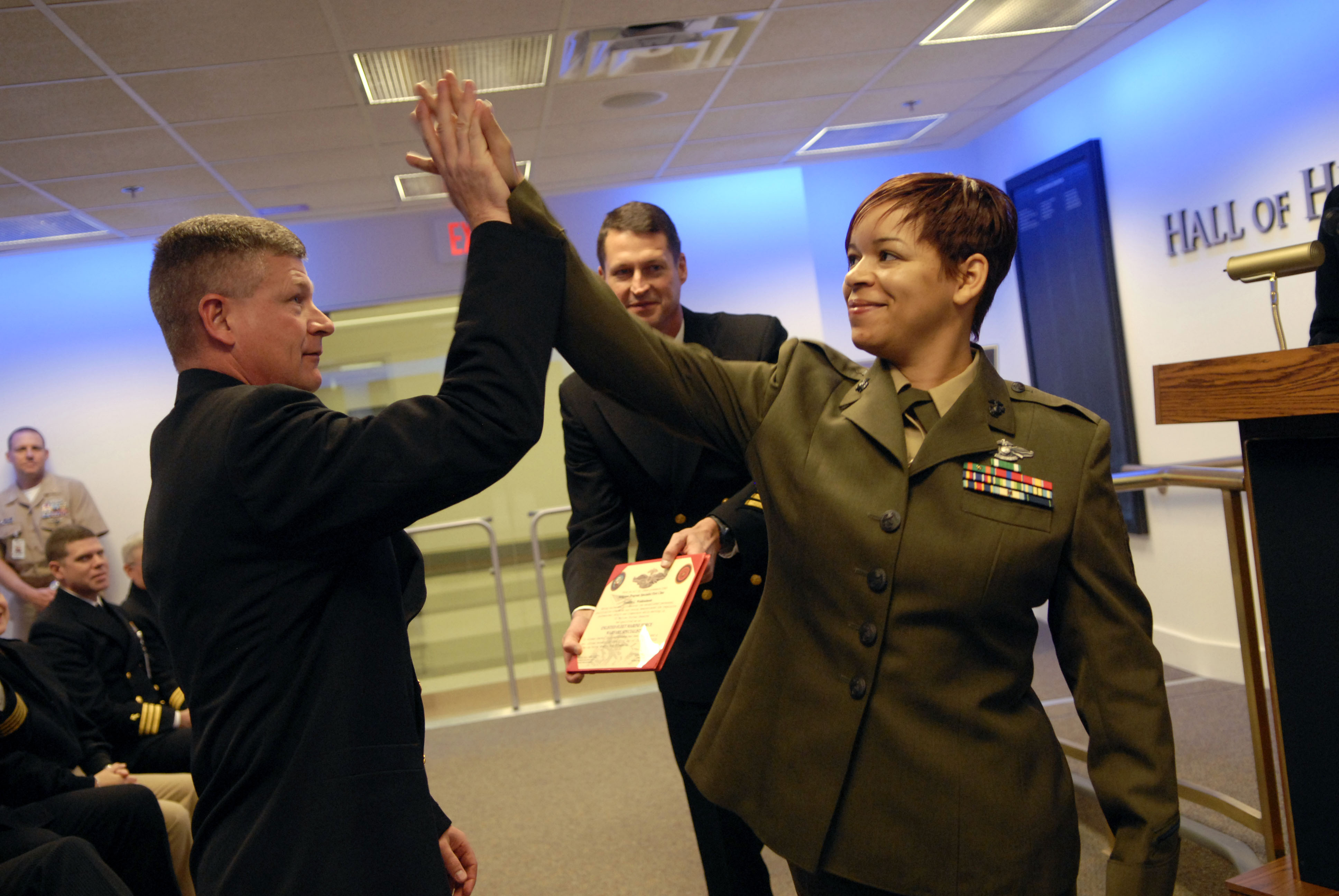
A navy chaplain's assistant wearing the Marine service 'A' uniform.

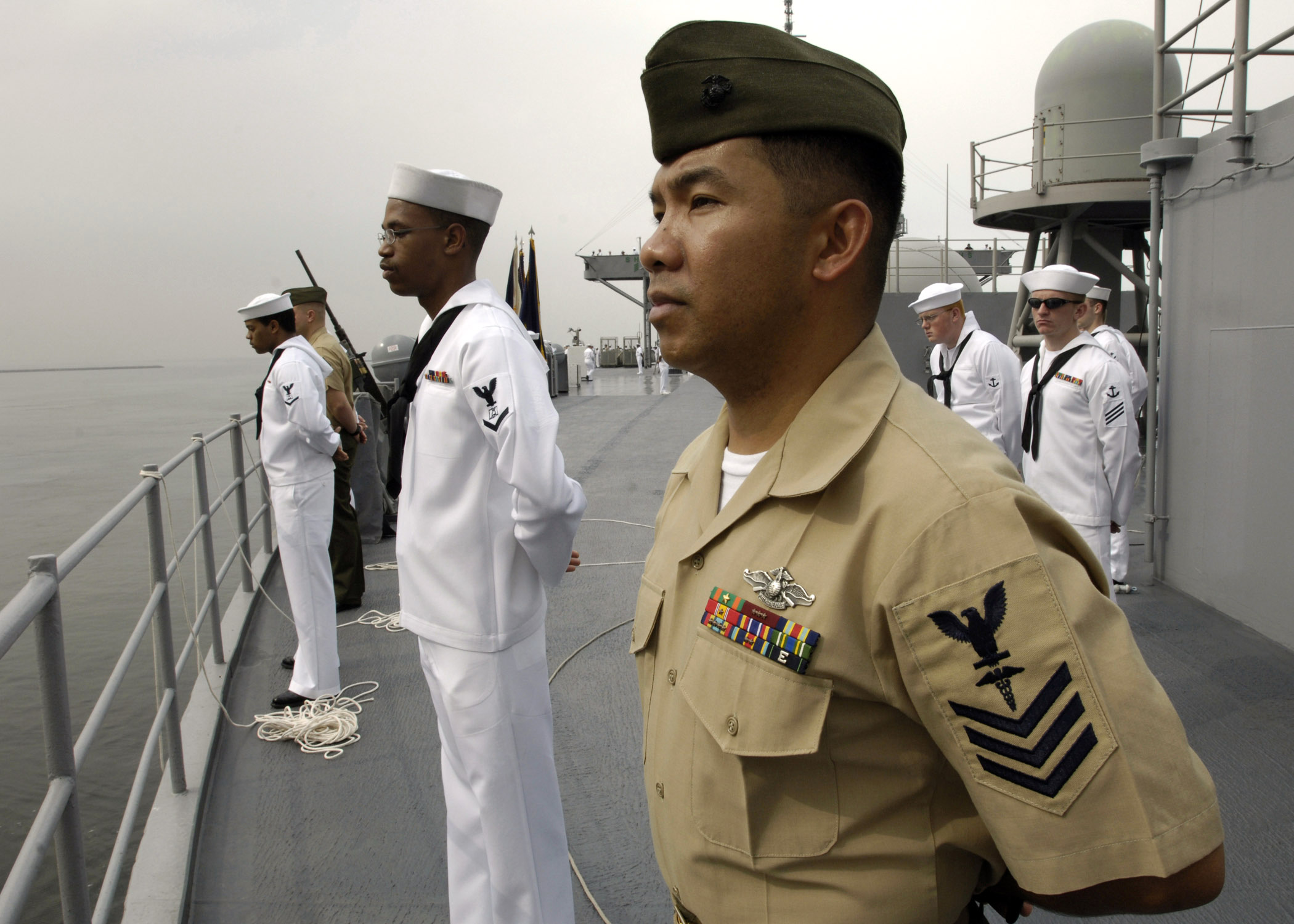
A navy corpsman wearing the Marine service 'C' uniform.

Navy officers and enlisted Sailors assigned to Marine units are authorized to wear all Marine uniforms except the Dress and Evening Dress uniforms. When wearing Marine uniforms, Navy personnel must meet and adhere to Marine grooming and physical regulations, as well as replace Marine insignia with U.S. Navy insignia whenever feasible. These members of the Fleet Marine Force include doctors, dentists, nurses, medical service, hospital corpsmen, chaplains, religious program specialists, lawyers, legalmen, naval gunfire liaison officers, divers, and Naval Academy midshipmen who are selected for Marine officership.

Most Marine units will have, at minimum, Navy medical and religious personnel, who will be issued and required to wear the MCCUU; wear of other Marine uniforms is optional. Medical battalions and dental battalions, being almost entirely Navy officers and Sailors, may direct other uniform wear. Other units, such as artillery, aviation, or legal units, may have other Navy personnel attached, and issued Marine uniforms.

== Comparison with the Army ==
Marines are sometimes confused with United States Army Soldiers, but there are several significant differences:

- Marines wear boots only with the utility uniform, while certain airborne-qualified and ceremonial Army units are authorized to wear shined black boots with service/dress uniforms. Both services make exceptions for boots with other working uniforms, such as coveralls, aviation, and cold weather uniforms.

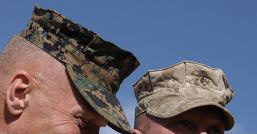
MCCUU 8-point utility covers

- The Marine utility cover is an 8-pointed creased and peaked cover, the Army uses a rounded kepi-style patrol cap. Unlike the Army, Marines do not currently wear rank insignia on the cover (although they did for about two years between 1986 and 1988), instead there is an Eagle, Globe, and Anchor in the middle of the cover.
- Marines wear woodland MARPAT camouflage utilities, or the desert variation when deployed in environmentally appropriate areas. Marines roll the sleeves up, with the exception when deployed. The Army wears Operational Camouflage Pattern Army Combat Uniforms and rolled sleeves are authorized only at the unit level. The undershirt for Marines is olive green and for the Army it is brown.
- Marines are not authorized to wear their utility uniforms off-base while on leave or liberty, except while in a vehicle traveling to or from base, or in an emergency. The Army offers more leeway in this regard, but still prohibits casual wear of utilities, especially in social or drinking scenarios.
- The Marine service uniform is a forest green coat with a belted waist and matching trousers worn with khaki shirt and khaki tie. The current Army green service uniform is a dark olive coat with a belted waist and contrasting drab trousers worn with a tan shirt and olive tie.
- The Marine blue dress uniform features a stand collar and red stripe in the trousers, while the Army blue dress uniform features an open collar worn with a white shirt and black tie, and a gold stripe on the trousers.
- The Marine service and dress uniforms displays fewer items - only rank insignia, ribbons, marksmanship badges, and breast insignia. The Army service uniform contains, in addition, branch insignia, distinctive unit and regimental insignia, combat and special skill badges, shoulder sleeve insignia (only on the green service uniforms), and skill qualification tabs above current unit shoulder sleeve insignia like the Ranger Tab or Sapper Tab.
- Likewise, Marines wear few items on their utilities, compared to the Army, which wear U.S. flag patches, shoulder sleeve insignia, service tabs, and have the option of wearing subdued combat and special skill badges when in garrison. Typically, the only distinguishing features on Marine utilities are service and name tapes; Eagle, Globe, and Anchor emblem; rank insignia; breast insignia (which is not worn in the field) and (depending on the personnel) the Red Patch.
- However, in the case of Class-B Army Green Service Uniform - long- or short-sleeve shirt without the coat, equivalent to Service Bravo and Charlie - Soldiers wear even fewer items than Marines. Only grade insignia is authorized. Decorations ribbons, combat, marksmanship, and special skill badges, identification badges, and nameplates are not authorized. All those are authorized on Bravo and Charlie.
- Marine service caps or barracks covers differ from their Army counterparts. The Marine cover sits higher and has a slightly larger and more pronounced crown that is less peaked and flat than the Army service cap. This distinctive look dates back to Marine barracks cover design used since World War II. In addition, Marine general officers' service caps do not have oak leaf embroidery around the headband as Army general officer caps, with the exception of the Commandant of the Marine Corps (and also if the Chairman of the Joint Chiefs of Staff is a Marine) who has oak leaf embroidery in the front part of the headband, sharing only the oak leaf design on the visor.
- Marine officer rank insignia is slightly different from Army insignia in design. When wearing a collared shirt, Marine officers wear their insignia on the shirt collar, unlike the Army, where officer rank is worn on the shirt epaulettes.
- Marines wear pin-on rank insignia on the collars of their utility uniform (MCCUU) while Soldiers wear their grade insignia on a pad in front of their utility uniform (ACU).

== See also ==
- Uniforms of the United States Armed Forces
