= Red Patch =

U.S. Marine occupational specialty marking

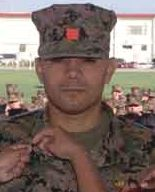
Marine wearing the red patch on the utility cover of his utility uniform.

The "Red Patch" is a distinguishing marking worn by United States Marines of the Logistics Specialist (0441) MOS (formerly 0481 Landing Support Specialist).

== History ==
The red patch dates back to the early days of WWII during the Battle of Guadalcanal. After the initial assault on the beachhead, follow-on troops came ashore and confusion on the beach led to landing support Marines (then known as shore party) and infantrymen getting mixed together. Some shore party Marines went inland along with infantry battalions, while some infantrymen were left behind on the beach. It is not known for certain who made the decision, but a device was created in order to distinguish the shore party Marines: a red patch on the trousers and hat, referred to by Marines as a cover, (a patch was not put on the blouse because many Marines did not wear them due to the heat of the South Pacific). Around the same time, Naval Shore Parties, now known as Beachmaster Unit One began to wear yellow patches on their uniforms, as they do today.

Shore party Marines were either assigned to pioneer battalions or as part of an infantry battalion's shore party. Pioneer battalions consisted of shore party Marines, combat engineers, and heavy equipment operators and were in charge of establishing beach support areas in the Pacific Theater of World War II. Pioneer battalions were sometimes used to relieve infantry battalions on the front lines and were often involved in heavy fighting in places such as Bloody Ridge on Guadalcanal. One of the more notable shore party Marines was 1st Lt. Alexander Bonnyman Jr., executive officer of the 2nd Battalion 8th Marines' Shore Party, who received the Medal of Honor for his actions during the Battle of Tarawa.

== Current usage ==
The red patch measures 3 in × 1 in (7.6 cm × 2.5 cm) on the trousers, worn 2.5 in (6.4 cm) below the cargo pocket, centered, and 1 in × 1 in (2.5 cm × 2.5 cm) on the front of the eight point cover, centered. A 1 in × 1 in (2.5 cm × 2.5 cm) patch is supposed to be worn on the front and rear of the Kevlar helmet, but this practice has fallen into disuse.

== See also ==
- Uniforms of the United States Marine Corps
- United States military beret flash
