= Blood stripe =

Lampasse (trouser stripe) on US Marine Corps uniforms

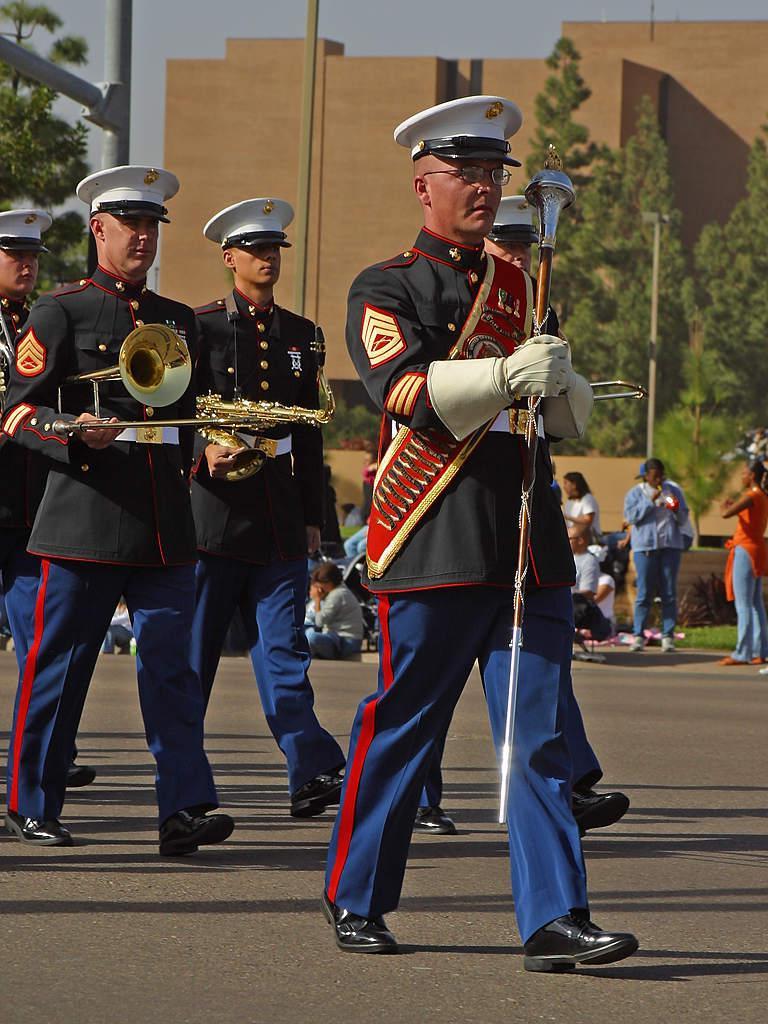
The blood stripe is visible on the uniforms of the Marine Corps Recruit Depot San Diego Band in 2003

A blood stripe is a scarlet stripe worn down the outside leg seams of trousers on the dress uniform of the United States Marine Corps. This red stripe is 2 inches (5.1 cm) for general officers, 1 1/2 inches (3.8 cm) for other officers, and 1 1/8 inches (2.9 cm) for enlisted staff noncommissioned officers and non-commissioned officers. Modified versions are worn on the officers' evening dress uniforms, with the scarlet flanked with gold trim, and on members of the Marine Band, which wear the traditional red stripe with a white stripe in the center.

== History ==
While trouser stripes were in use in various militaries for many years (especially the British Army, whose uniforms influenced American uniforms for many years, as well as the red stripes of the Spanish Navy Marines). In 1837, President Andrew Jackson ordered uniform changes that included the Marine Corps adopt the Army's practice of wearing stripes the same color as uniform jacket facings. These original stripes were buff white to match changes to the uniform jacket, but when the jacket was changed back to dark blue with red trim in 1839, the stripes remained, but altered to a similar blue edged in red. A U.S. Naval Institute history of USMC uniforms records that orders issued in January 1840 provided that officers and non commissioned officers were to wear a scarlet stripe down the outside seam of their blue trousers.

Marine Corps legend purports that the corps adopted the blood stripe to honor fallen marines from the Battle of Chapultepec in 1847, although the stripe had already been in use for a number of years prior to 1847, making such a claim a myth. Additionally, while the blood stripe myth purports to honor the excessive casualties suffered by marines during the battle, only seven marines were killed, far fewer than the army's casualties.

== See also ==
- Lampasse for military trouser-stripes in general.
- Leatherneck
- Eagle, Globe, and Anchor
- Uniforms of the United States Marine Corps

== Sources ==
- "Marine Corps Uniform Regulations". Mco P1020.34G W/Ch 1-5. United States Marine Corps. 31 March 2003.
- Dress Blues on marines.com
- Blood Stripe on Answers.com
- "Marine Corps Uniforms". Marine For Life. 3 September 2006. Archived from the original on 23 August 2009.
- Leicht, Paul W. (March 5, 2004). "Earning the Blood Stripe: Marines remember a legacy of sacrifice". Marine Corps Air Station Miramar: United States Marine Corps. Archived from the original on June 4, 2011.
