= Leatherneck =

Military slang

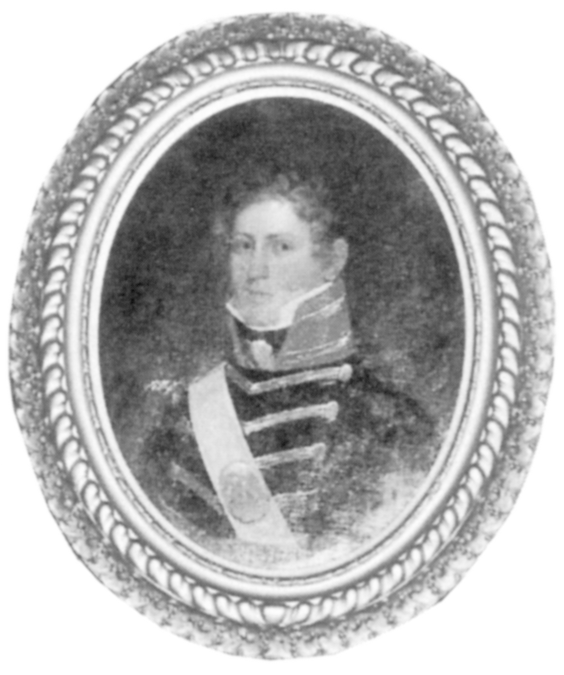
Circa 1817, First Lieutenant Charles Rumsey Broom, USMC, sports a black leather stock beneath a high collar, which gave birth to the term "leatherneck"

Leatherneck is a military slang term in the U.S. for a member of the United States Marine Corps. It is generally believed to originate in the wearing of a "leather stock" that went around the neck. Its original purpose was to protect the neck from slashing blades in battle but it also served to keep the head and the neck erect when the uniform was worn.

== History ==
The term "Leatherneck" was derived from a leather stock once worn around the neck by both American and British Marines and soldiers (British sailors referred to Royal Marines as "Bootnecks"). Beginning in 1798 "one stock of black leather and clasp" was issued to each United States Marine every year. Its use as a synecdoche for Marines began as a term of ridicule by sailors.

The dress blue uniform of the US Marines still bears a tribute to that stock collar today, with a stiff cloth tab behind the front of its collar.

== Leather neck collar ==
The leather collar, from which this nickname originates, is generally considered to be a stiff leather collar, fastened by two buckles at the back. It is generally measured between 2.5 and more than 3 inches tall in front, tapering toward the back.

The stock was uncomfortable, but Marines would be punished for failure to wear them on duty, so some would have the stock stitched to their coats to ensure it was always on their uniform. General George F. Elliott, recalling its use after the American Civil War, said the "effect of the stock when buckled around a man's neck was to hold his head high in the air, like geese looking for rain".

The stock was dropped as an article of American Marine uniform in 1872 after surviving through the uniform changes of 1833, 1839, and 1859.

It is not entirely clear why the leather neck collar was put into the uniform. There are two primary theories, that it was for aesthetic purposes or for protection.

=== As aesthetics ===
According to Our Navy, the official newspaper of the US Navy, the origin of the leather neck collar, also known as a "stock", has to do with early 19th-century military fashion trends in Europe and North America; its use among enlisted men supposedly improved their military bearing and appearance by forcing the chin high and posture straight.

=== As protection ===
According to other sources, the stock collar was worn originally to protect the neck from sword cuts, such as cutlass slashes while boarding ships. Some sources, such as the National Museum of the Marine Corps explicitly dispute this as a popular but untrue myth, however.

== Alternative etymology for Royal Marines ==
The American Marine Corps nickname "leatherneck" is generally attributed to the wearing of the leather stock. The use of the term "Bootneck" for British Royal Marines had a similar cause, and also on the alleged habit of cutting a strip of leather from the top of a boot to provide additional protection for the neck, although it is unclear if this was ever common practice.

== See also ==
- Leatherneck Magazine
- List of U.S. Marine Corps acronyms and expressions
- Lou Diamond (Mr. Leatherneck)
- M1858 Uniform
