= Utility cover =

U.S. Marine Corps cap

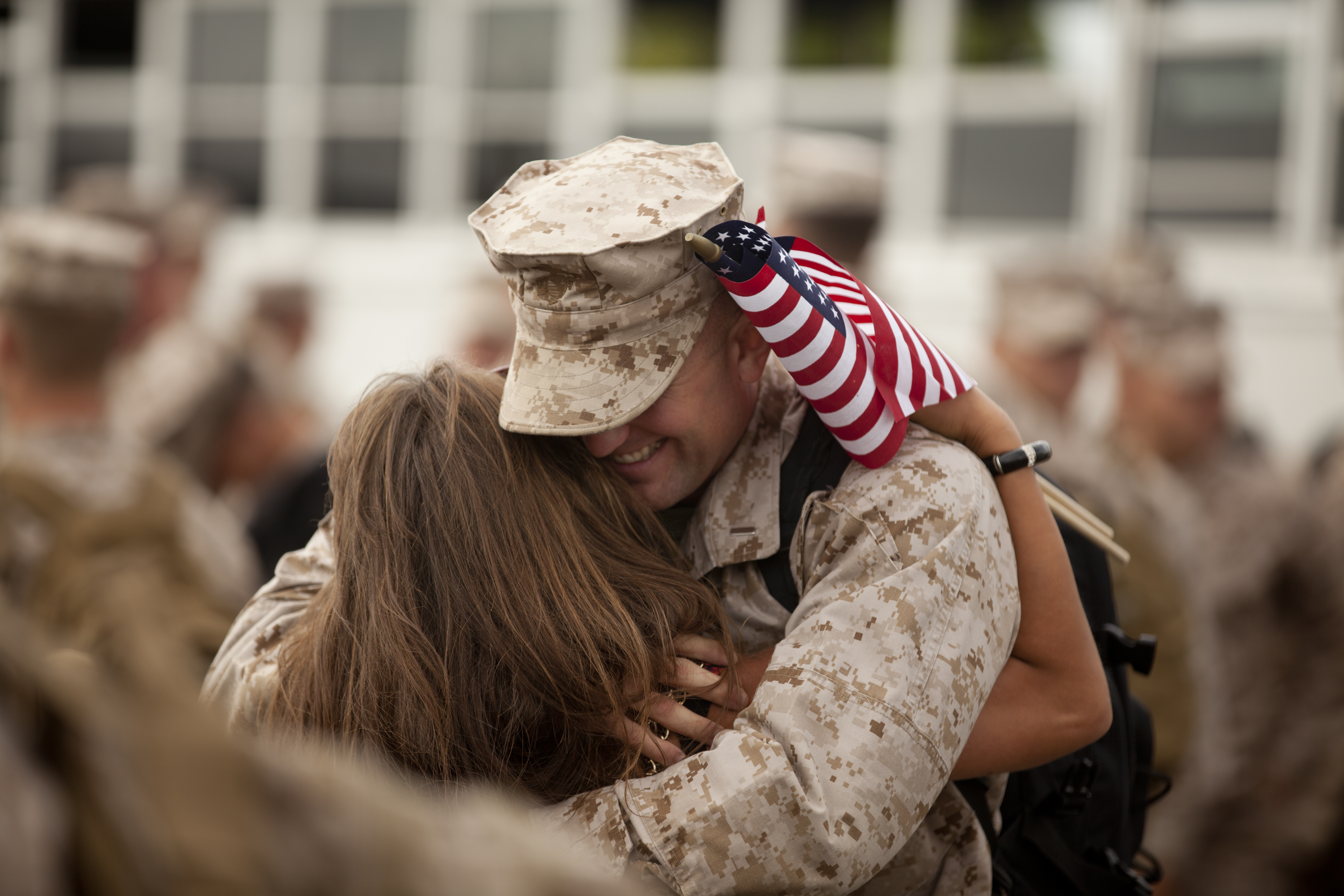
A member of the Marine Regiment at the Marine Corps Base Hawaii, in 2013.

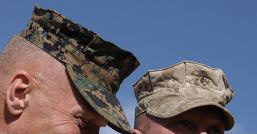
Woodland and desert MARPAT utility covers

The utility cover, also known as the utility cap and eight-pointed cover, is the United States Marine Corps cap, worn with their combat utility uniform. It is an eight-pointed hat, with a visor similar to a baseball cap. It is worn "blocked", that is, creased and peaked, for a sharper appearance. A version is also worn as part of the U.S. Navy's Navy Working Uniform. Certain Air Expeditionary Force Airmen also wear them.

== History ==
The utility cover was first issued in World War II, with the Herringbone Twill utility uniform issued in 1943. It was based on a US Army field cap design and a railroad engineer cap. World War II Marines nicknamed it the raider cap from its use by the Marine Raiders. It was made from herringbone twill until 1959, when the material changed to cotton sateen.

== See also ==
- List of hat styles
- Boonie hat
- Patrol cap the United States Army and United States Air Force equivalent.
- Side cap
