= Uniforms of the United States Coast Guard Auxiliary =

Uniforms worn by members of the United States Coast Guard Auxiliary

The uniforms of the United States Coast Guard Auxiliary serve to distinguish Auxiliarists from members of other civilian military auxiliaries and of other armed services.

Each auxiliary uniform is identical to a Coast Guard officer's uniform, with the exception that the buttons and stripes on dress jackets and shoulder boards are silver in color, rather than gold.

== History ==
Prior to 1972, all Coast Guard personnel, including Auxiliarists, wore the same uniforms as the United States Navy, with distinctive Coast Guard insignia. In 1972, Commandant of the Coast Guard Admiral Chester R. Bender introduced a new set of blue uniforms for wear by all personnel, which were also adopted by the Auxiliary.

Unlike Navy uniforms, the new "Bender's blues" uniforms made few distinctions between officers and enlisted personnel, with all ranks generally wearing the same style of uniform (with the exception of a few formal uniforms reserved for officers only).

== Dress uniforms ==
Auxiliarists generally wear the same dress and service uniforms as active duty personnel, but with Auxiliary-specific insignia and (on dress uniforms) silver buttons and braid instead of gold. Previously, this included the white "choker" uniform but these uniforms are no longer authorized for Auxiliarists. Additionally, because the Auxiliary does not award full-sized versions of its medals, Auxiliarists are de facto precluded from wearing the Full Dress Blue uniform.

=== Service dress uniforms ===
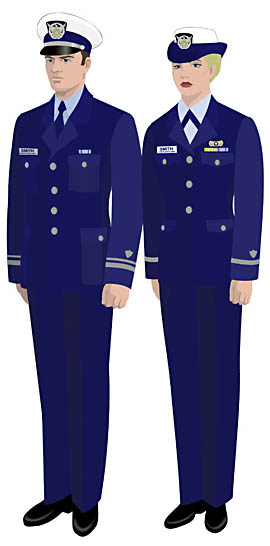
Service Dress Blue

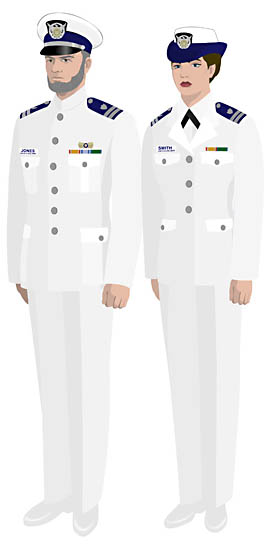
Service Dress White (Authorized for commodores and chaplains only)

=== Service uniforms ===
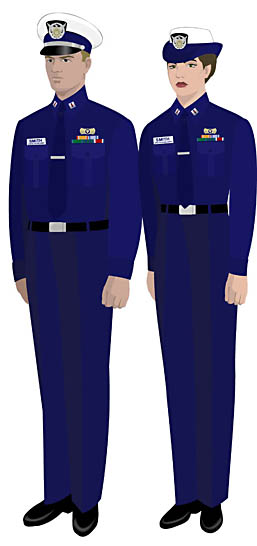
Winter Dress Blue

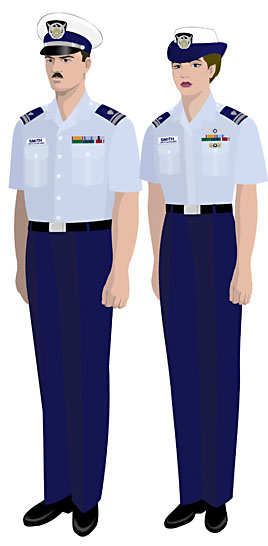
Tropical Blue

=== Dinner dress uniforms ===
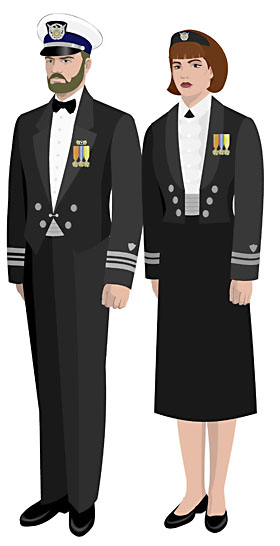
Dinner Dress Blue Jacket

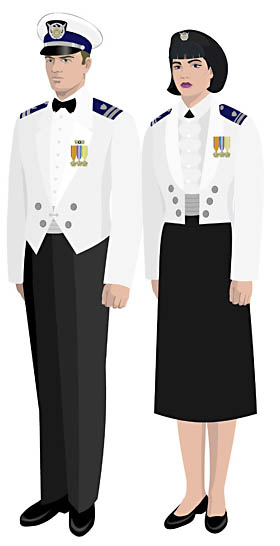
Dinner Dress White Jacket

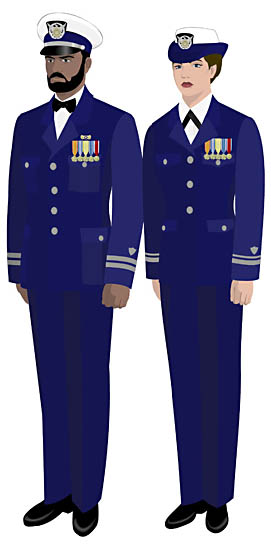
Dinner Dress Blue

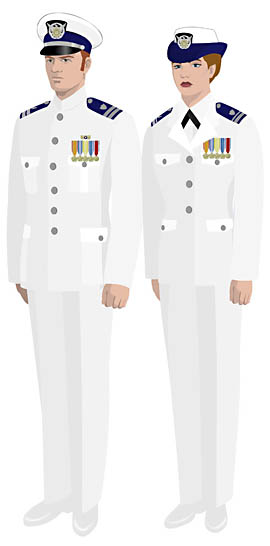
Dinner Dress White (Authorized for commodores and chaplains only)

=== Auxiliary Blue Blazer Outfit ===
For those Auxiliarists who do not wish to wear military-style dress uniforms, an "Auxiliary blue blazer outfit," is authorized, which is similar in style to a yacht club uniform. It consists of a navy blue blazer with a Coast Guard Auxiliary crest on the breast pocket, white shirt or blouse, navy tie, grey or white dress trousers or skirt, and black dress shoes. The blazer outfit is particularly encouraged, but not strictly required, for those Auxiliarists who do not meet Coast Guard height, weight, and grooming standards.

== Working Uniforms ==
=== Operational Dress Uniform ===
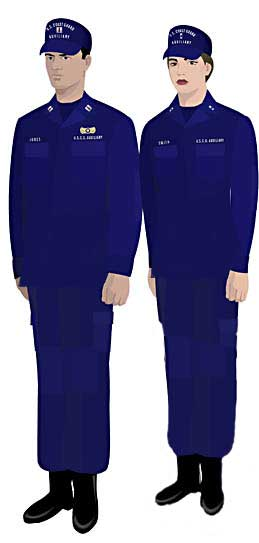
Operational Dress Uniform (ODU)

Auxiliarists wear the Operational Dress Uniform (ODU) as the standard working uniform. The ODU is similar to the old Battle Dress Uniform, both in function and style, but is a solid dark blue color, rather than camouflage, and lacks lower pockets on the blouse. In the fall of 2008 a second-generation Operational Dress Uniform was introduced, with the major change being that the top is worn on the outside of, rather than tucked into, the trousers.

Composite toe boots are the standard footwear but brown leather boat shoes may be prescribed for wear while aboard boats.

A baseball cap-style cover, with "U.S. Coast Guard Auxiliary" embroidered in silver block lettering, is worn with the ODU. There is also an optional broad-brimmed "sun hat" available.

Auxiliarists also have the option of wearing either the dark blue "operational polo shirt" or the "Vessel Examiner polo shirt" in lieu of the ODU top and t-shirt, when conducting surface operations and Vessel Safety Checks respectively. The operational polo shirt is a dark blue polo shirt with "USCG AUXILIARY" embroidered on the left breast and the wearer's named embroidered on the right breast, similar to the ODU top. The Vessel Examiner polo shirt was previously a shade of light blue but was redesigned and made available in both white and dark blue in 2020. It includes a Coast Guard Auxiliary crest and the words "Vessel Examiner" embroidered on the left breast.

In 2019, Coast Guard Uniform Board No. 48 announced that a new working uniform to replace the ODU was in development. Initially dubbed the "Coast Guard Utility" uniform and then the "Coast Guard Working Uniform," the design is based on the Navy Working Uniform Type III but in solid blue color similar to the current ODU. It was also announced that the version approved for the auxiliary will be less-similar to the active duty version than the ODU had been. Specifically, the Auxiliary version will include contrasting silver nametapes and full color (rather than subdued) National Ensign and Coast Guard Auxiliary Ensign patches. It will also be restricted to those Auxiliarists who meet active duty height/weight standards. An Auxiliary Alternative Working Uniform (see below) was simultaneously being developed for Auxiliarists who do not meet these standards.

=== Flight Suit ===
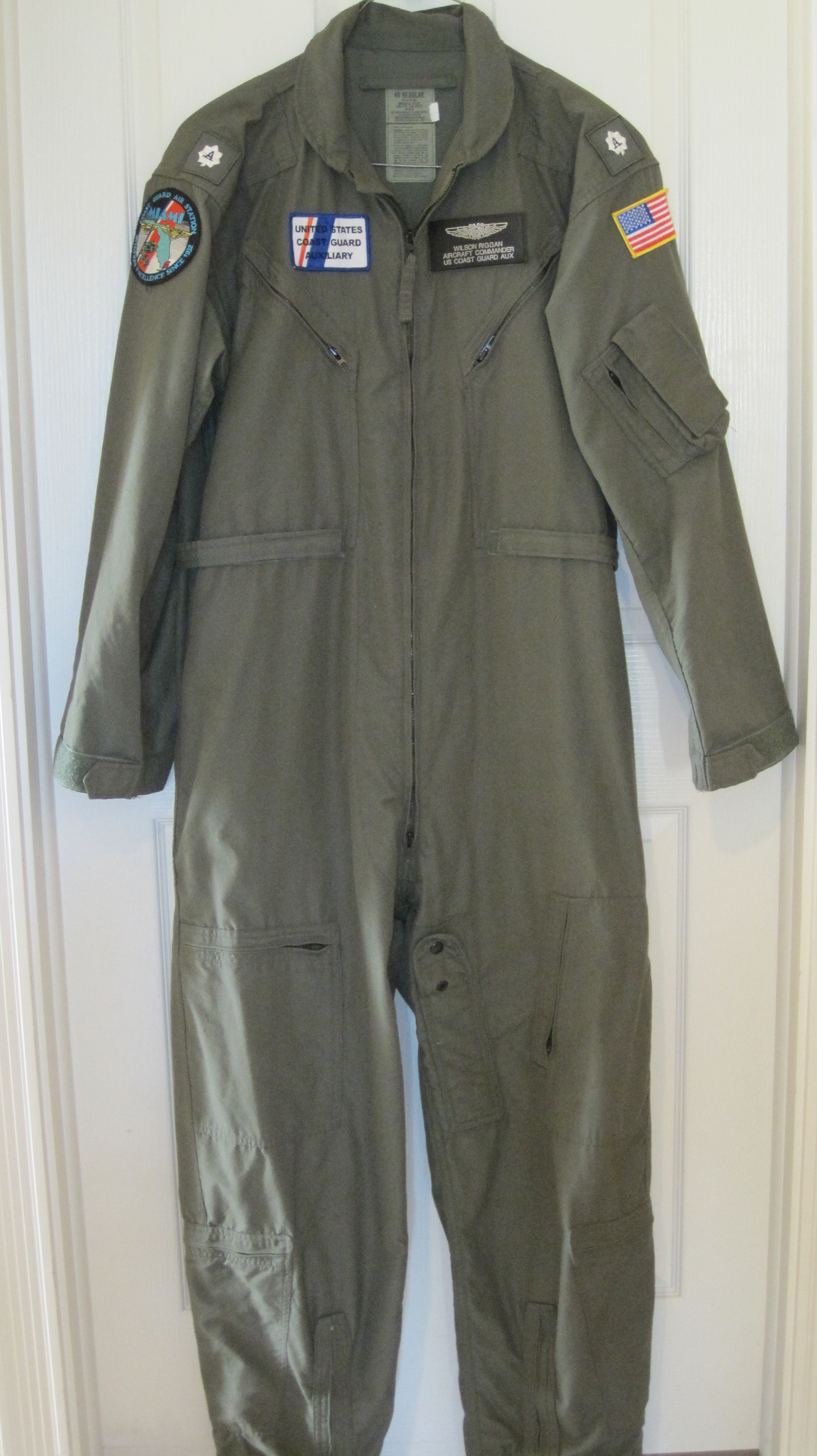
Flight Suit

Auxiliarists engaged in aviation activities wear the standard green Nomex one-piece CWU 27/P flight suit worn by military flight crews but with Auxiliary insignia. The Coast Guard considers flight suits to be "organizational clothing" rather than standard uniforms (i.e., clothing issued by local commands for special work situations to be worn in those situations only). Accordingly, they are not authorized outside of conducting flight operations.

Auxiliary flight suits may include the shoulder patch of the local Coast Guard Air Station with which they are affiliated.

=== Hot Weather Uniform ===
The "Hot Weather Uniform," consists of the ODU t-shirt, dark blue cargo shorts, and baseball cap. Either brown leather boat shoes or black ankle boots may be worn. The Hot Weather Uniform was formerly authorized for active duty personnel but was discontinued because it was felt the uniform did not look professional enough for military personnel. It was, however, permitted to remain in service with the Auxiliary.

=== Auxiliary Alternate Working Uniform ===
The "Auxiliary Alternate Working Uniform" (or "AWU") is an alternative to the ODU for those members who either do not meet Coast Guard height, weight, and grooming standards, or simply prefer not to wear military-style uniforms. It consists of a dark blue polo shirt with the Coast Guard Auxiliary crest embroidered over the left breast, dark blue cargo pants, and black boots or boat shoes.
