= Operational Dress Uniform =

Normal work uniform of the United States Coast Guard

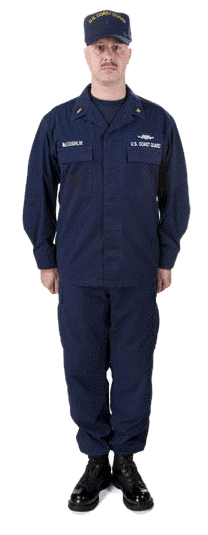
A Coast Guardsman wearing the untucked ODU

The Operational Dress Uniform (ODU) is the normal work uniform of the United States Coast Guard, the United States Coast Guard Auxiliary, the National Oceanic and Atmospheric Administration Commissioned Officer Corps, and the United States Public Health Service Commissioned Corps (PHSCC). It is also one of the uniforms worn by the New York Naval Militia.

== History ==
=== 2000s ===
The Coast Guard introduced the new "Operational Dress Uniform" (ODU) uniform in 2004 to replace the "Working Blue" and "Undress Blue" uniforms (winter and summer variants). Resembling law enforcement SWAT fatigues, the first generation of ODU differed substantially from the then-current Battle Dress Uniform in that the blouse lacked lower pockets and was intended to be worn tucked into the trousers. The blouse sleeves were allowed to be worn rolled up or down according to personal preference. The trousers featured large cargo packets with buttoned closures and were worn bloused above the boots (or straight legged if worn with boat shoes). A dark blue Coast Guard unit ballcap was worn with this uniform.

A 2006 issue of the Reservist magazine was devoted to a detailed and easy-to-understand graphical description of all the authorized uniforms.

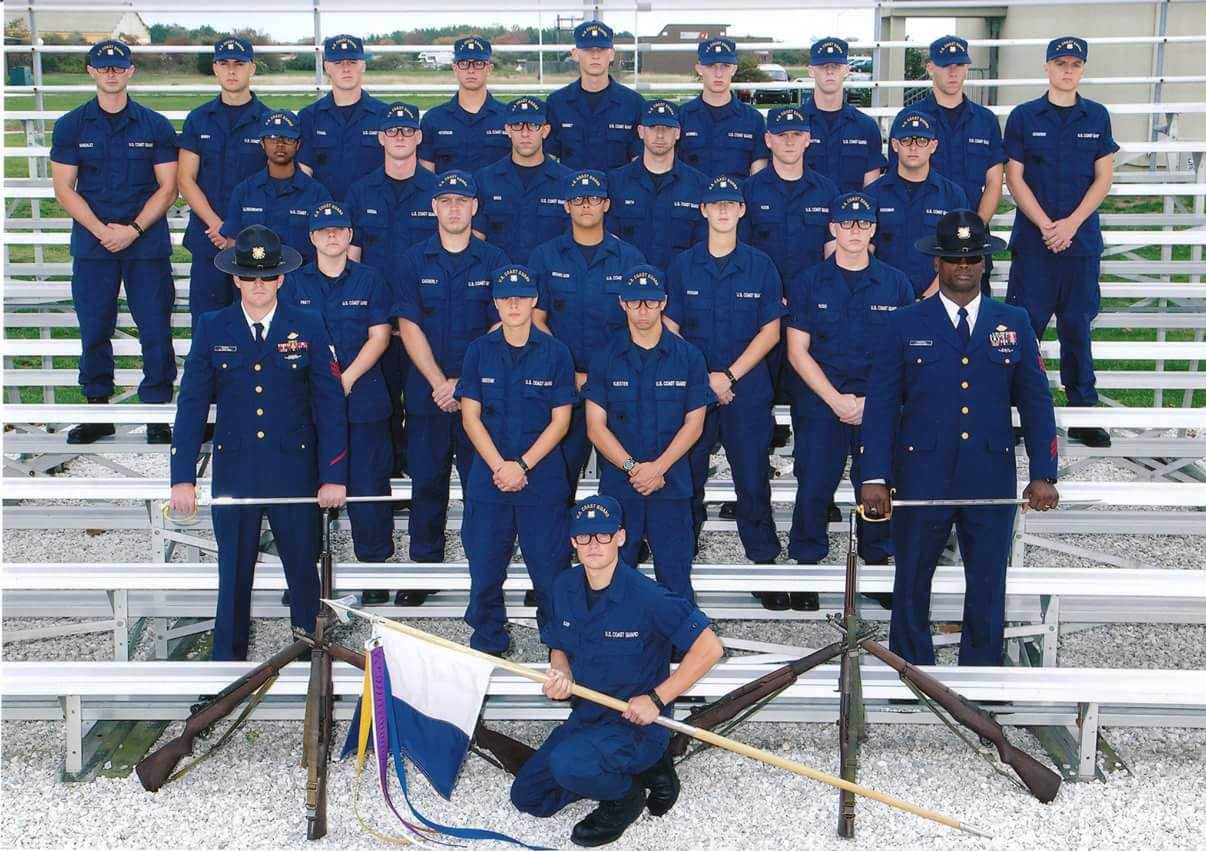
USCG graduates wearing ODUs in 2010

In 2008, a new generation of the ODU was introduced and gradually replaced the tucked version through 2012. This second generation featured an untucked shirt blouse, and was therefore unofficially known as the "Untucked ODU." The blouse featured a Coast Guard insignia embroidered in black on the right breast pocket and the trouser cargo pocket flaps.

In 2008, ODUs were adopted by the National Oceanic and Atmospheric Administration Commissioned Corps, replacing the U.S. Navy working khakis.

From the 1980s until the late 2000s, Coast Guard units engaged in combat operations or otherwise deployed overseas generally wore the U.S. Navy Combat Utility Uniform (the Navy version of the Battle Dress Uniform). When the Navy replaced the CUU with the Navy Working Uniform Type II and Type III, circa 2009, the Coast Guard followed suit.

=== 2010s ===
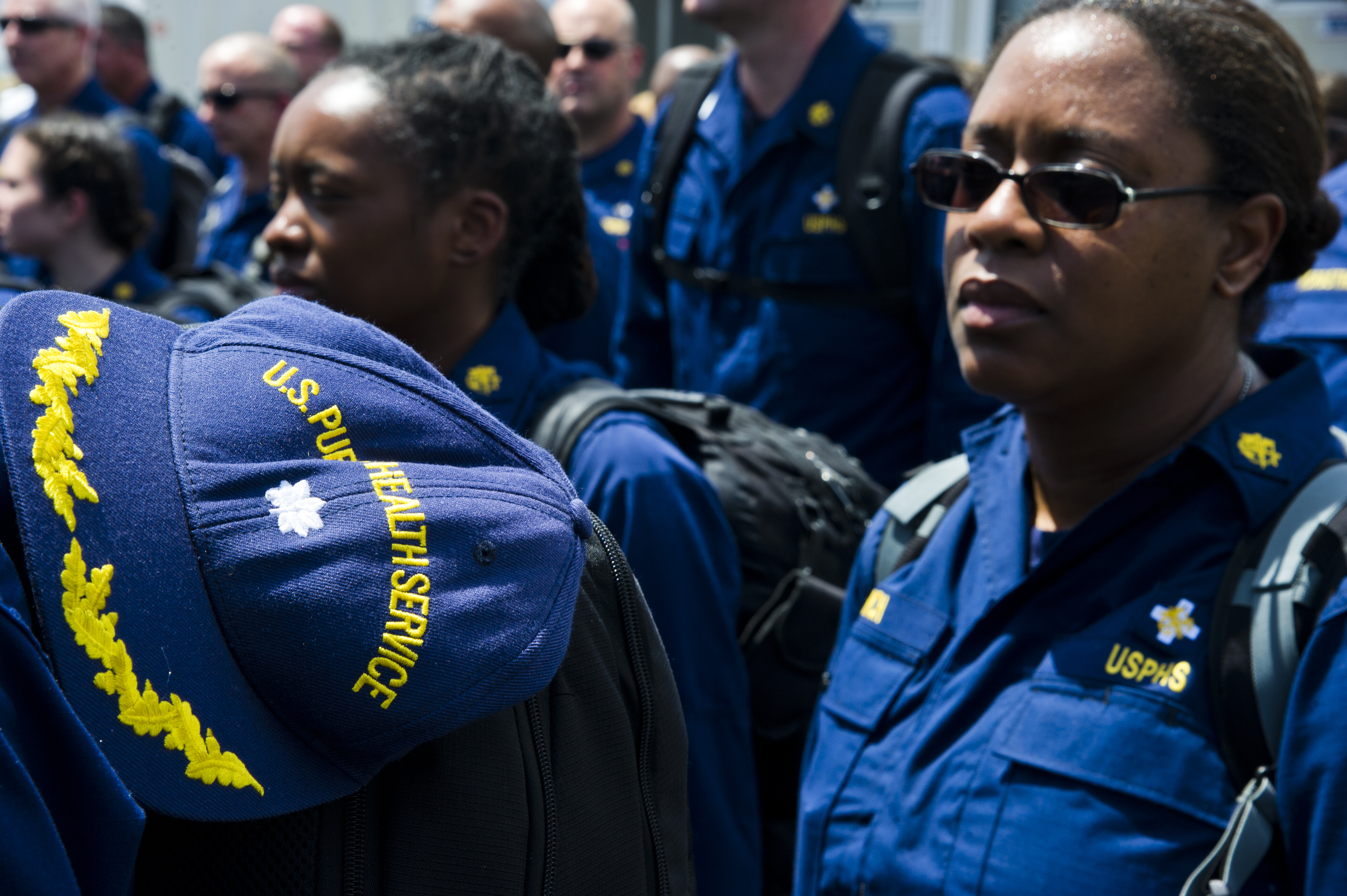
USPHS CC officers wearing ODUs in 2014

In 2015, the ODU uniform was adopted as the daily work uniform of the United States Public Health Service Commissioned Corps, replacing the Battle Dress Uniform.

In August 2016, the United States Navy announced it was eliminating the Navy Working Uniform Type I in favor of the Type III as its standard working uniform ashore. The Type I has earlier been found to not be suitable for shipboard use and the Navy began developing a standard uniform for sea duty. The ODU has been viewed as one potential model.

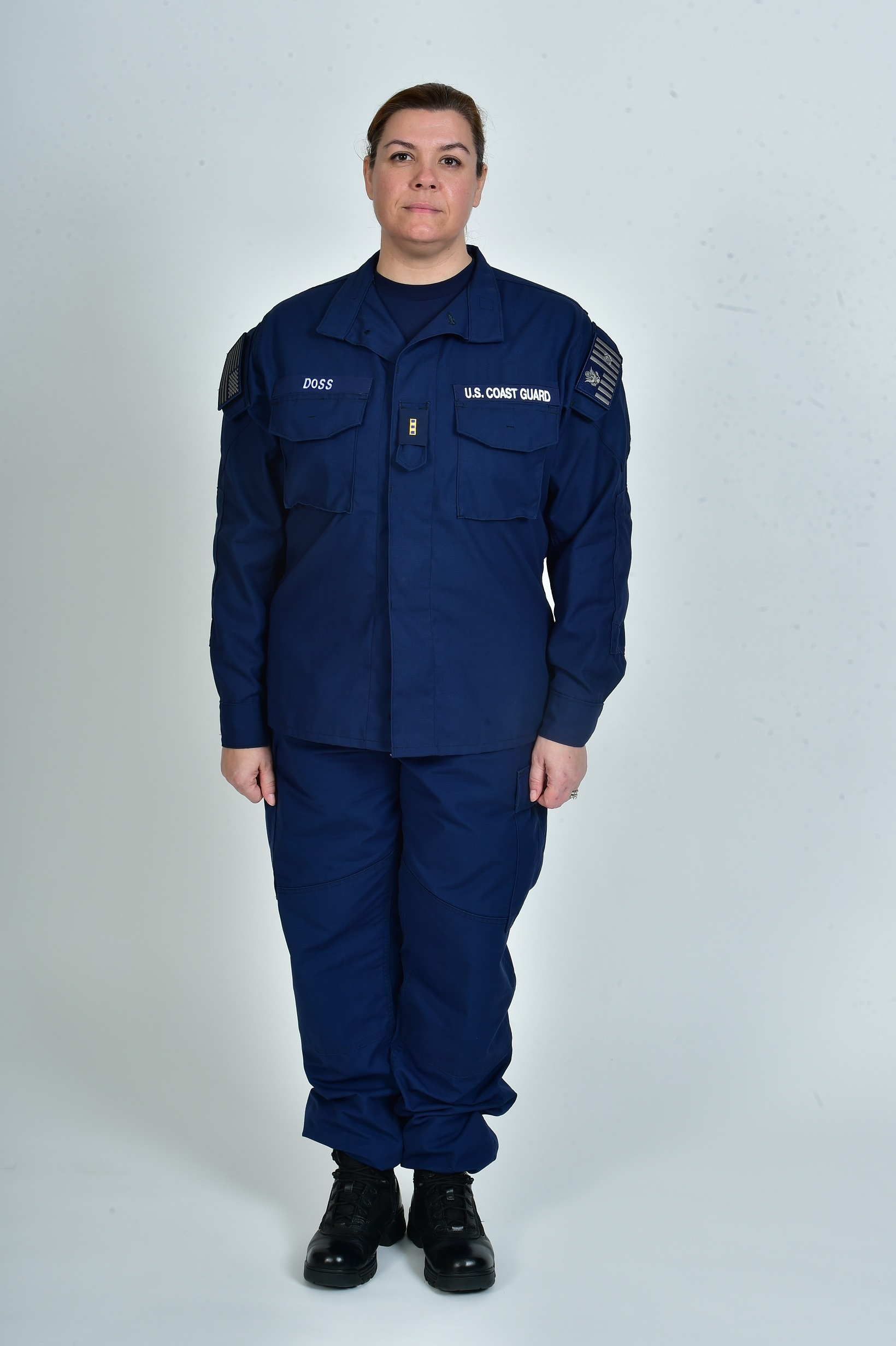
A Coast Guardsman modeling the new Coast Guard Working Uniform.

In September 2017, Coast Guard Uniform Board 47 announced several changes to the ODU. Notably, the Coast Guard insignia would no longer be embroidered on the trouser pocket flaps and that "U.S. COAST GUARD" would no longer be stenciled on the left breast of the T-shirt. Additionally, wear of the boonie hat was more widely permitted.

In November 2019, Uniform Board 48 announced authorization to develop the Next Generation Coast Guard Utility Uniform ("CGU") to replace the current ODU. The CGU will be patterned on the Navy Working Uniform Type III but will be solid blue in color. The Master Chief Petty Officer of the Coast Guard and other senior enlisted members have been photographed wear testing a prototype. The approved version, announced in late 2019, has been dubbed the "Coast Guard Working Uniform" or "CGWU."

=== 2020s ===
In November 2021, the Coast Guard announced that the new CGWU will begin distribution in 2023, and the ODU would be phased out by 2025.

== See also ==
- Uniforms of the United States Coast Guard
- Uniforms of the United States Coast Guard Auxiliary
