= Navy Working Uniform =

United States Navy utility uniforms

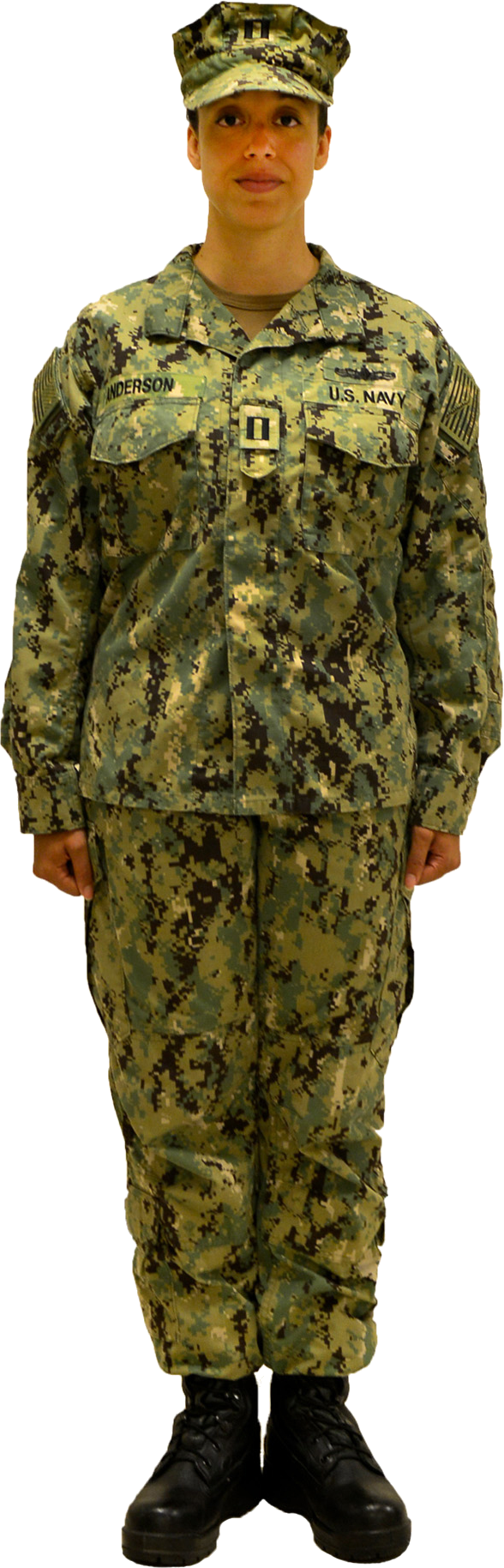
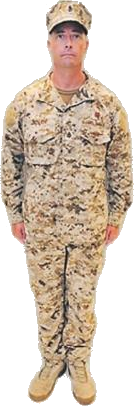
- From left to right: A U.S. Navy Lieutenant wearing the NWU Type III, bearing the AOR2 camouflage pattern and a chief petty officer wearing the NWU Type II in AOR1.
- Type: Military uniforms
- Place of origin: United States

Service history
- In service: 2009–2019 (NWU Type I) (Note: Prototypes tested from 2004 to 2008.); 2010–present (NWU Type II and III)
- Used by: United States Navy; U.S. Coast Guard; U.S. Naval Sea Cadet Corps; New York Naval Militia
- Wars: Global War on Terrorism

Production history
- Designed: 2004 (NWU Type I), 2009 (NWU Type II and III)
- Unit cost: 120.00$ (MSRP in 2010, minus boots)
- Produced: 2004–2017 (NWU Type I); 2009–present (NWU Type II and III)
- Variants: NWU Type I, NWU Type II, NWU Type III, NWU-D (limited prototype, defunct, obsolete), NWU-C (limited prototype, defunct, obsolete)

The Navy Working Uniform (NWU) is a series of military uniforms that are currently used by the United States Navy (and some elements of the U.S. Coast Guard) for wear by its members. The NWU is a "working" uniform, which means that it is made to a more durable and utilitarian standard, thus being worn in lieu of more formal uniforms that might get unduly damaged or dirtied in the process of normal military duties.

The first NWU variant, known as the NWU Type I, was designed in late 2004 and began being used by the U.S. Navy in limited quantities beginning in late 2008. By late 2010, it had completely replaced most other "working" uniforms. Colloquially called both "Blueberries" and "Aqua-flage" (a portmanteau of aquatic and camouflage), it was made of a ripstop cotton–nylon blend and featured a blue and grey camouflage pattern. Though originally intended for shipboard use, the nylon content caused the uniforms to lack sufficient flame resistance for shipboard environments, and it was replaced with flame-resistant coveralls when working shipboard. Due to the unsuitability of its camouflage pattern ashore, the NWU Type I was completely retired from use in 2019, replaced by other variants.

There are currently two variants of the NWU in use by the U.S. Navy for shore environments. The NWU Type II, which has a primarily tan and brown camouflage pattern called AOR1, is designed to be worn in sandy and arid desert battlefield environments, while the NWU Type III, which has primarily green, brown, and black pattern called AOR2, is designed to be worn in more temperate environments such as the contiguous United States.

NWU Type III is now worn by all U.S. Navy personnel. The NWU Type III has been issued to new naval recruits since late 2017 and completely replaced the NWU Type I in 2019 when the latter was discontinued and phased out of service. The NWU Type II is worn only by specialized units such as the Naval Special Warfare Development Group, Navy SEALs, Special Amphibious Reconnaissance Corpsmen, Explosive Ordnance Disposal Technicians, and Seabees when in the appropriate environment.

== Background ==
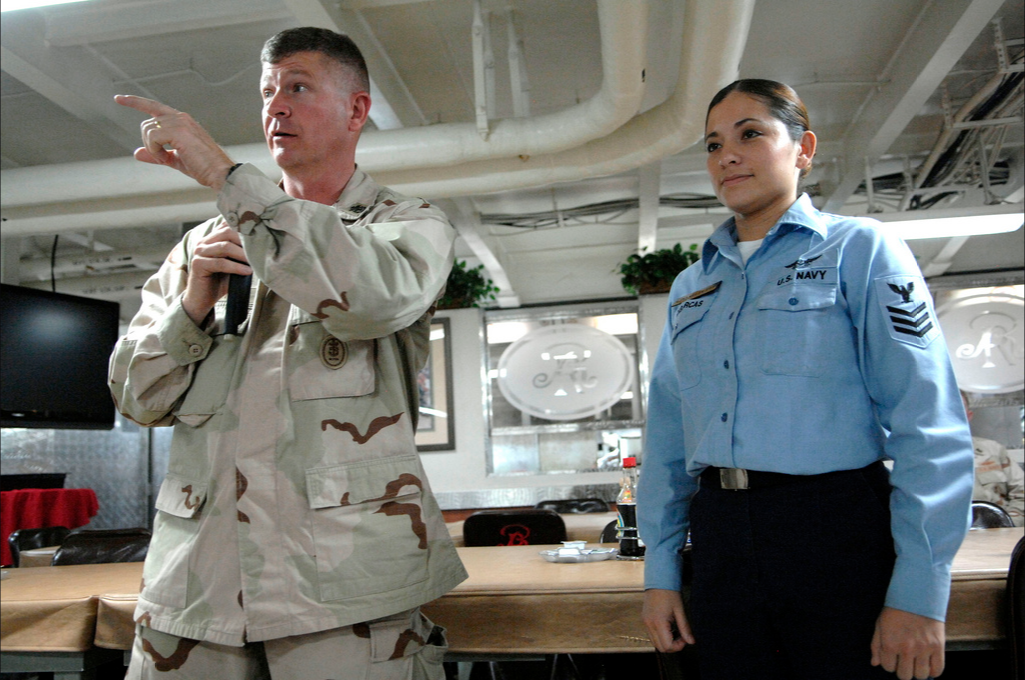
Master Chief Petty Officer of the U.S. Navy Rick D. West in September 2009 wearing a Desert Camouflage Uniform next to a petty officer wearing the utility uniform. Both of these uniforms would ultimately be replaced by the NWU, the latter in late 2010 and the former a few years later.

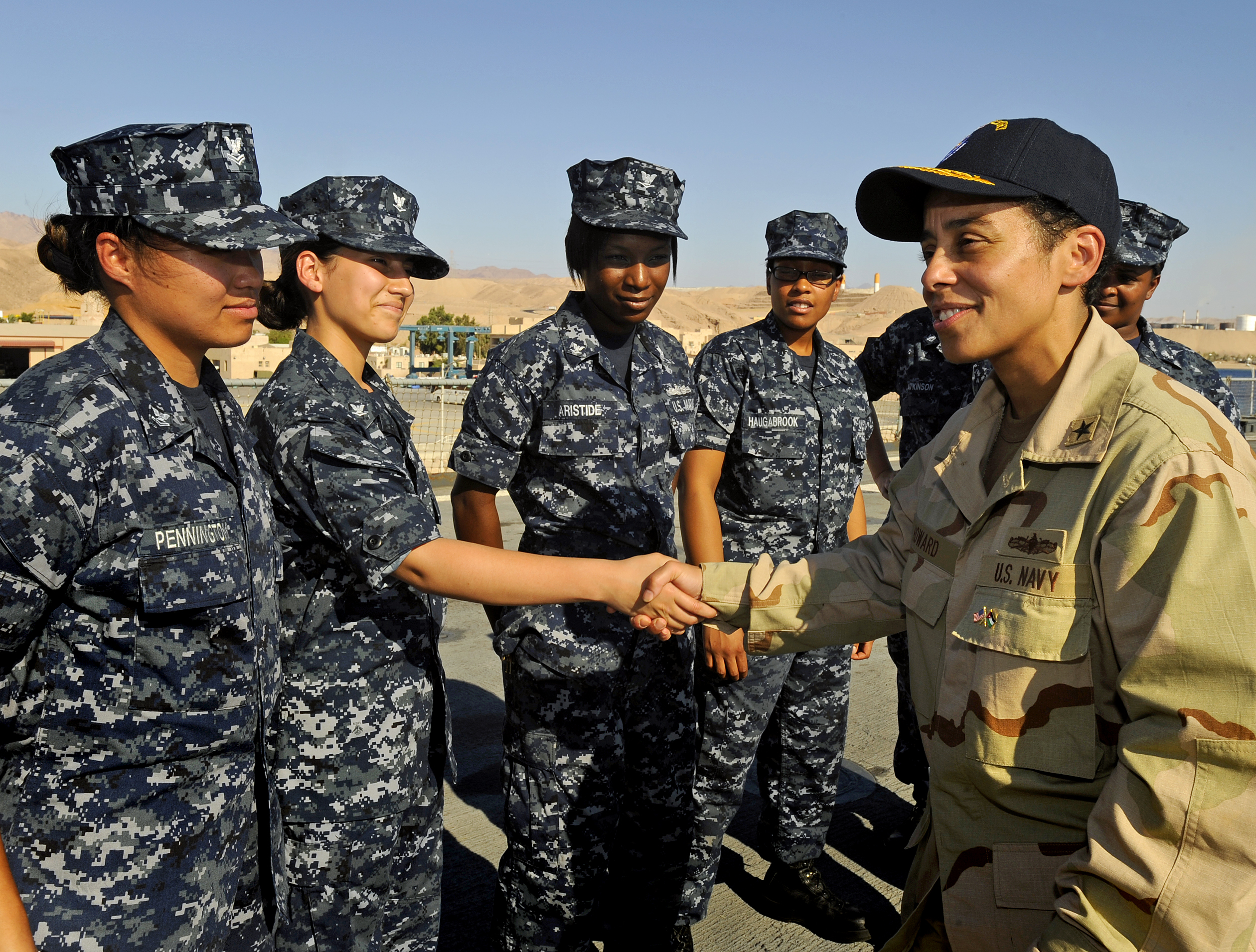
Rear Admiral Michelle J. Howard in July 2009, wearing a Desert Camouflage Uniform while meeting with U.S. Navy sailors wearing the NWU Type I. The DCU was eventually replaced by the NWU Type II a few years later and the NWU Type I discontinued in 2019.

As a standing professional military force, the U.S. Navy has three main categories of uniforms for its members to wear, referred to as dress, service, and working. Dress uniforms are elaborate, designed to be worn during formal occasions of prestige and state, in that regard, they are roughly similar to a civilian tuxedo or a three-piece suit. Service uniforms are more casual, designed to be worn in an everyday context, such as in an office setting. Working uniforms are more durable and utilitarian, designed for use in battle and environments where other more formal clothing would be impracticable and might get unduly damaged or dirtied.

Prior to the NWU's introduction in late 2008, the U.S. Navy's sailors and officers wore three main working uniforms: The coveralls, which were worn by all sailors and officers and were made from a blue polyester and cotton blend fabric; working khakis, also known as wash khakis, which were tan in color and worn by officers and chief petty officers only; and utilities, which consisted of a light blue shirt and dark blue trousers and were worn by seamen and petty officers only.

During this time there were also various other working uniforms that were available to U.S. Navy sailors to wear, such as the winter working blue (consisting of a black shirt and trousers) and aviation working greens (an olive green jacket and trousers worn with a tan shirt and black tie), but these were rarely worn. By late 2010, the NWU replaced all of these uniforms with the exception of the coveralls, which are still worn today in the polyester/cotton version and a newer flame-resistant version. In addition, some sailors, such as U.S. Navy corpsmen wear the Marine Corps Combat Utility Uniform when assigned to a U.S. Marine Corps unit. Other sailors, such as Navy SEALs, SWCC, and Seabees, formerly wore the Battle Dress Uniform and Desert Camouflage Uniform when in operating areas, both of which have since been largely replaced by the NWU Type III and NWU Type II respectively.

== Design ==
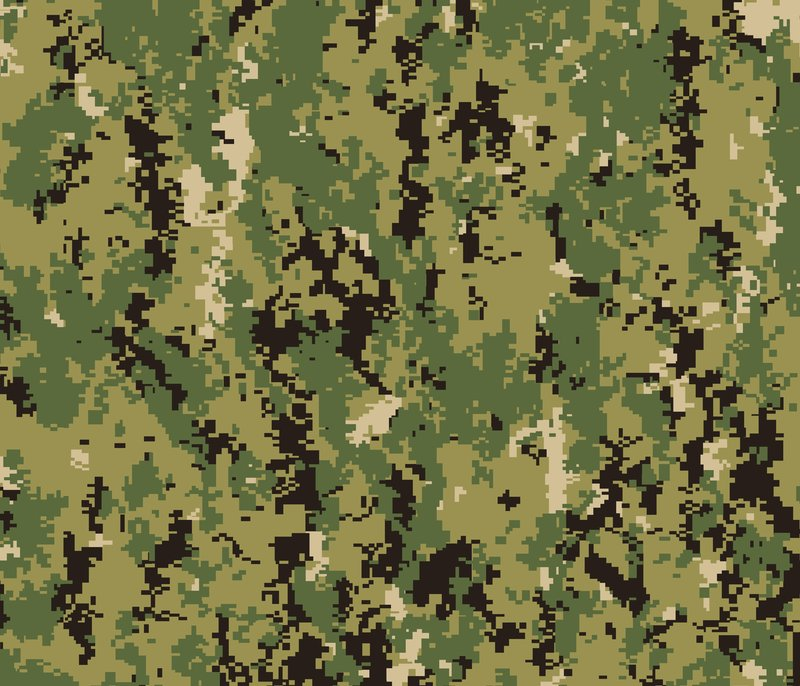
AOR2, the camouflage pattern used on the NWU Type III

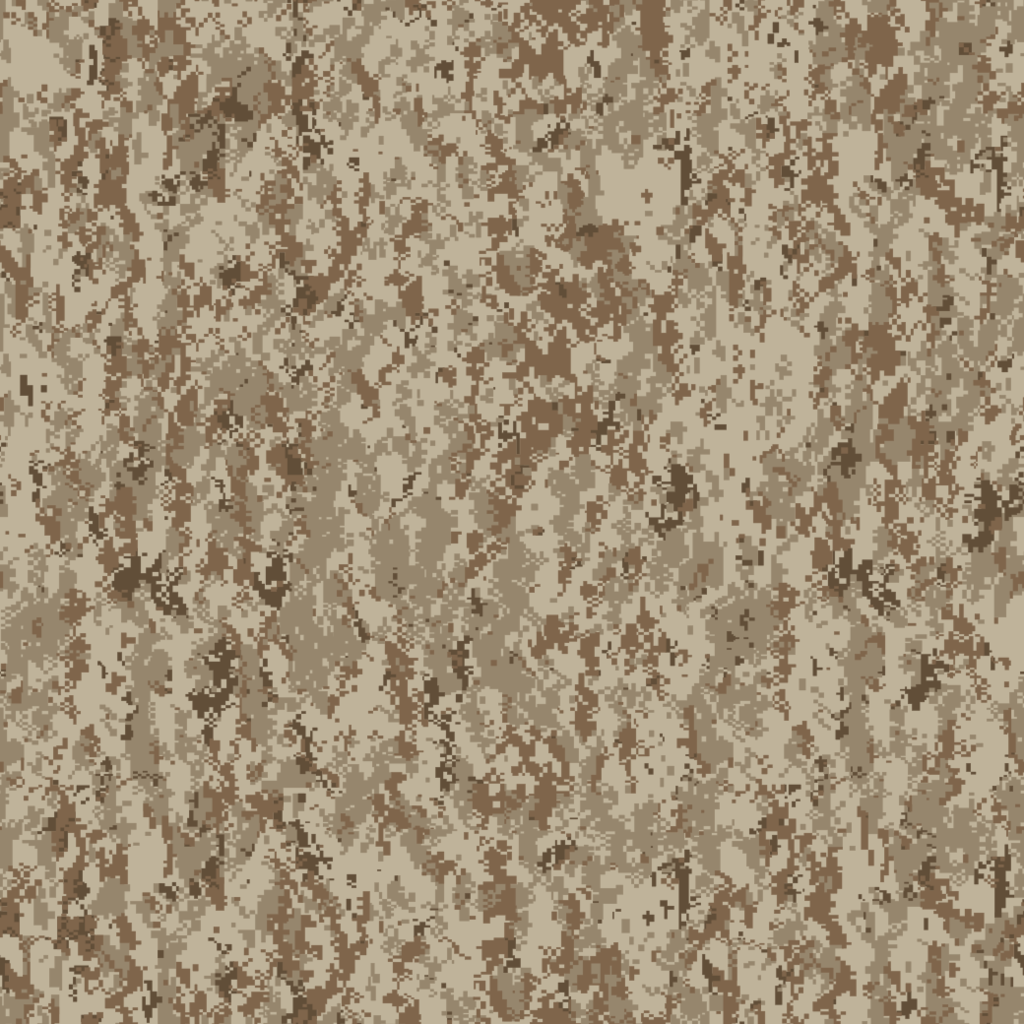
AOR1, the camouflage pattern used on the NWU Type II

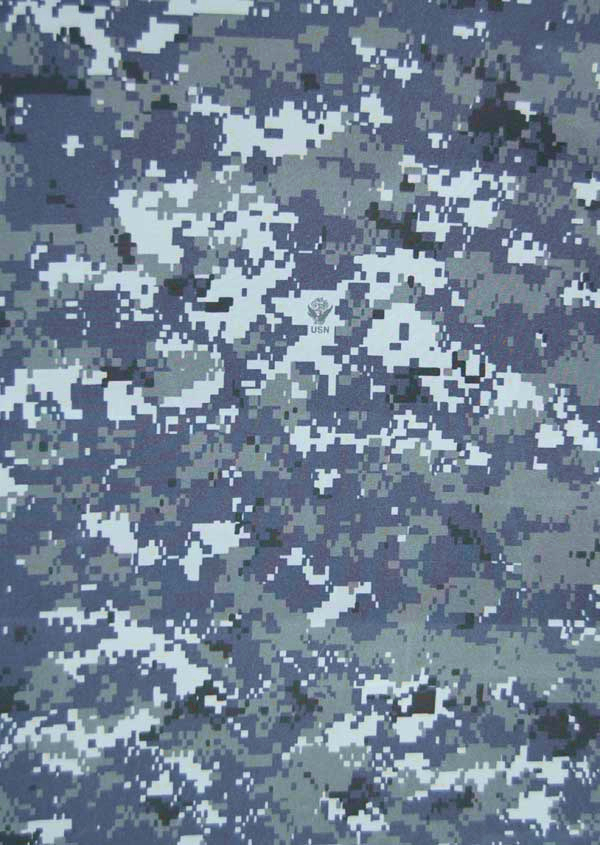
The camouflage pattern used on the NWU Type I

The NWU consists of three main components: a jacket, a pair of trousers, and a hat known as an eight-point cover. The uniforms are made using a fabric bearing a camouflage pattern reminiscent of computer pixels; the version used on the Type II intended for arid areas is known as AOR1 and the version on the Type III for use in woodland areas is known as AOR2. The jacket is worn over a brown short-sleeved T-shirt. The overall blue color of the discontinued NWU Type I, according to the U.S. Navy, was intended to reflect the U.S. Navy's heritage and connection to seaborne operations. The colors were also chosen to match the most commonly used paint colors aboard ship, extending the lifetime of the uniform on long deployments where uniforms often come into contact with freshly painted surfaces. The pixelated pattern was advertised as ostensibly being able to hide wear and stains, something unavoidable with the utilities and working khakis used previously.

The uniform is primarily composed of a ripstop 50/50 nylon and cotton blend, which eliminates the need for a "starch and press" appearance and reduces the possibility of snags and tears from sharp objects (thus making the garment last longer). However, this blend combines high flammability with the strength to hold onto the sailor's body while burning, which is why the NWU is no longer authorized aboard ships. All-weather garments include a unisex black "mock turtleneck", a black fleece jacket, a brown fleece jacket (which is only authorized outside the contiguous United States.) and a matching camouflage parka.

Black safety boots, identical to those worn by the U.S. Coast Guard with their Operational Dress Uniform, are worn with the NWU. Brown or tan boots can be authorized for wear when deployed, though black is the standard color of boot for sailors located in the contiguous United States.

The NWU Type III has its rank insignia in the form of a slip-on piece of fabric displayed on the chest between the breast pockets. The NWU Type III is worn with an embroidered or laser cut U.S. flag on the right sleeve pocket flap, and an embroidered or laser cut First Navy Jack flag patch on the left sleeve pocket flap both attached by hook and loop fasteners. Alternatively, Sailors may be authorized to wear approved "command patches" in place of the First Navy Jack flag patch on the left sleeve pocket flap. Also on the NWU Type III, name-tapes and badges are placed and sewn onto the blouse.

=== Durability ===
Like the previous working uniforms, the NWU is designed to allow personnel to stay warm and dry in inclement weather, thus they are designed to be slightly larger for the wearing of sweaters underneath. The NWU, unlike its predecessors, was also designed to be longer-lasting and does not need to be ironed like previous uniforms. The uniform also has more pockets than its predecessors, with four on the shirt including the two pockets on the sleeves of the uniform, and six on the trousers. The NWU Type I was phased into service beginning in late 2008 and through to January 2009.

== History ==
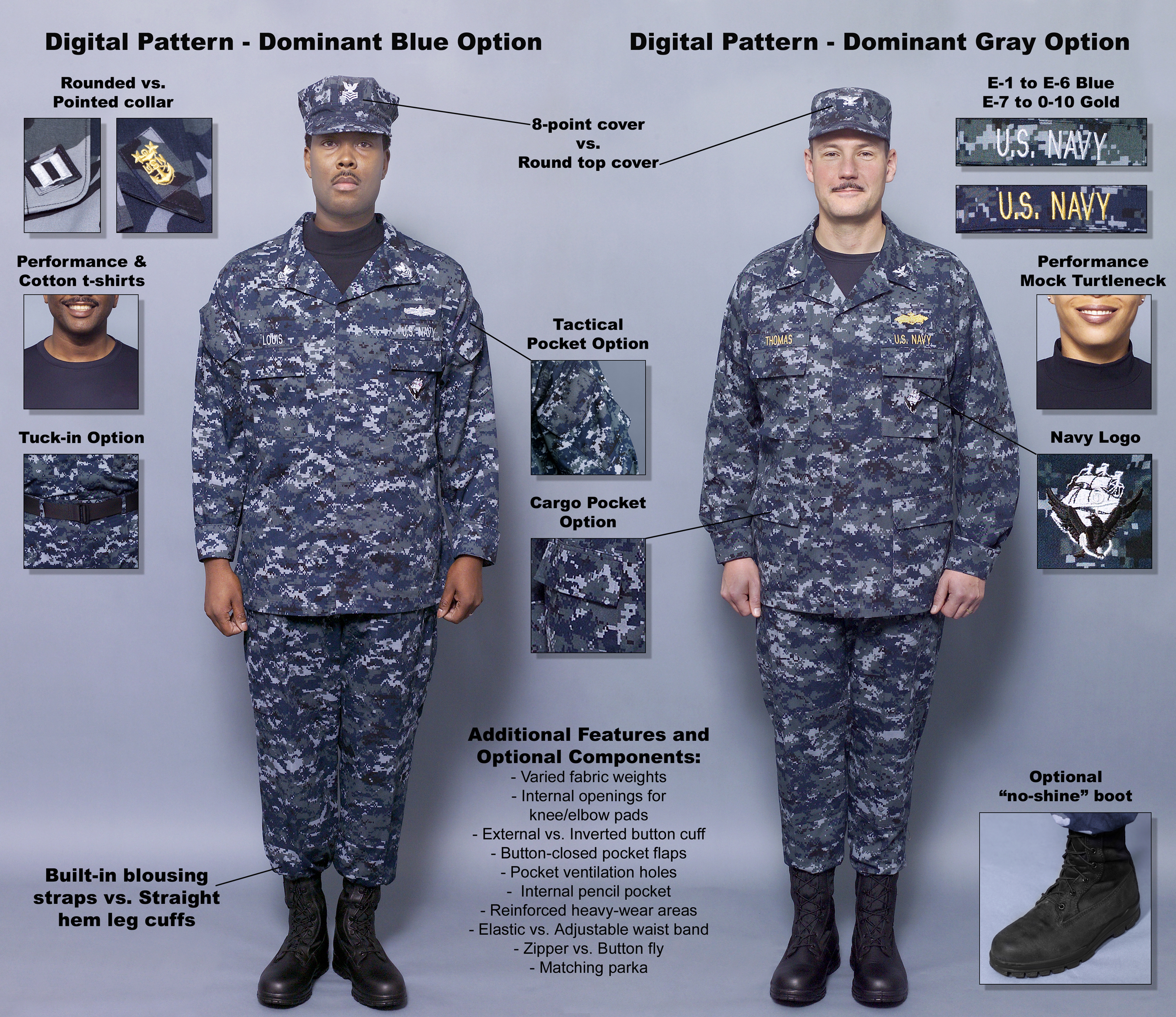
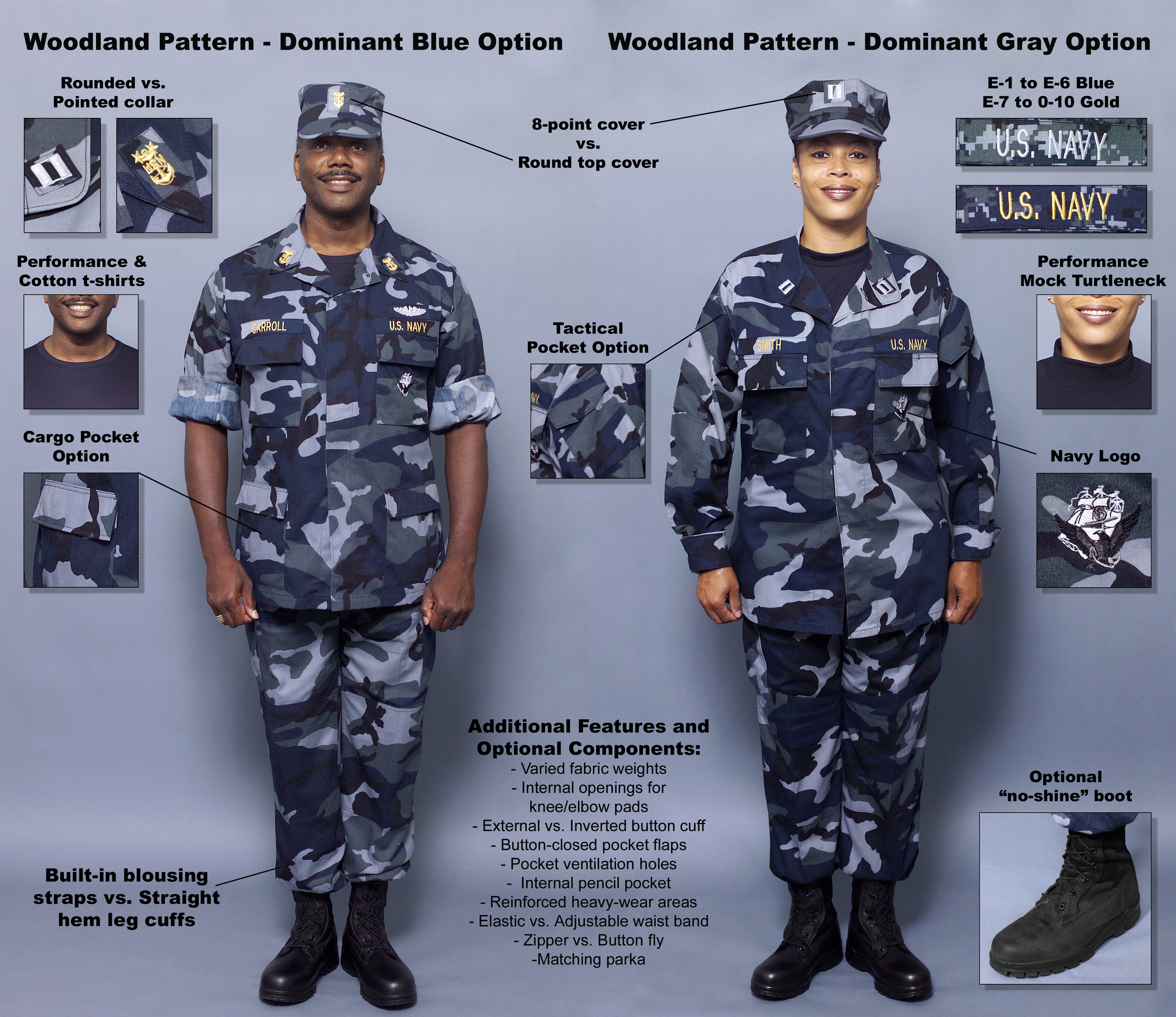
Infographics released by the U.S. Navy in October 2004 detailing the four possible new prototype NWU-D and NWU-C concept uniforms

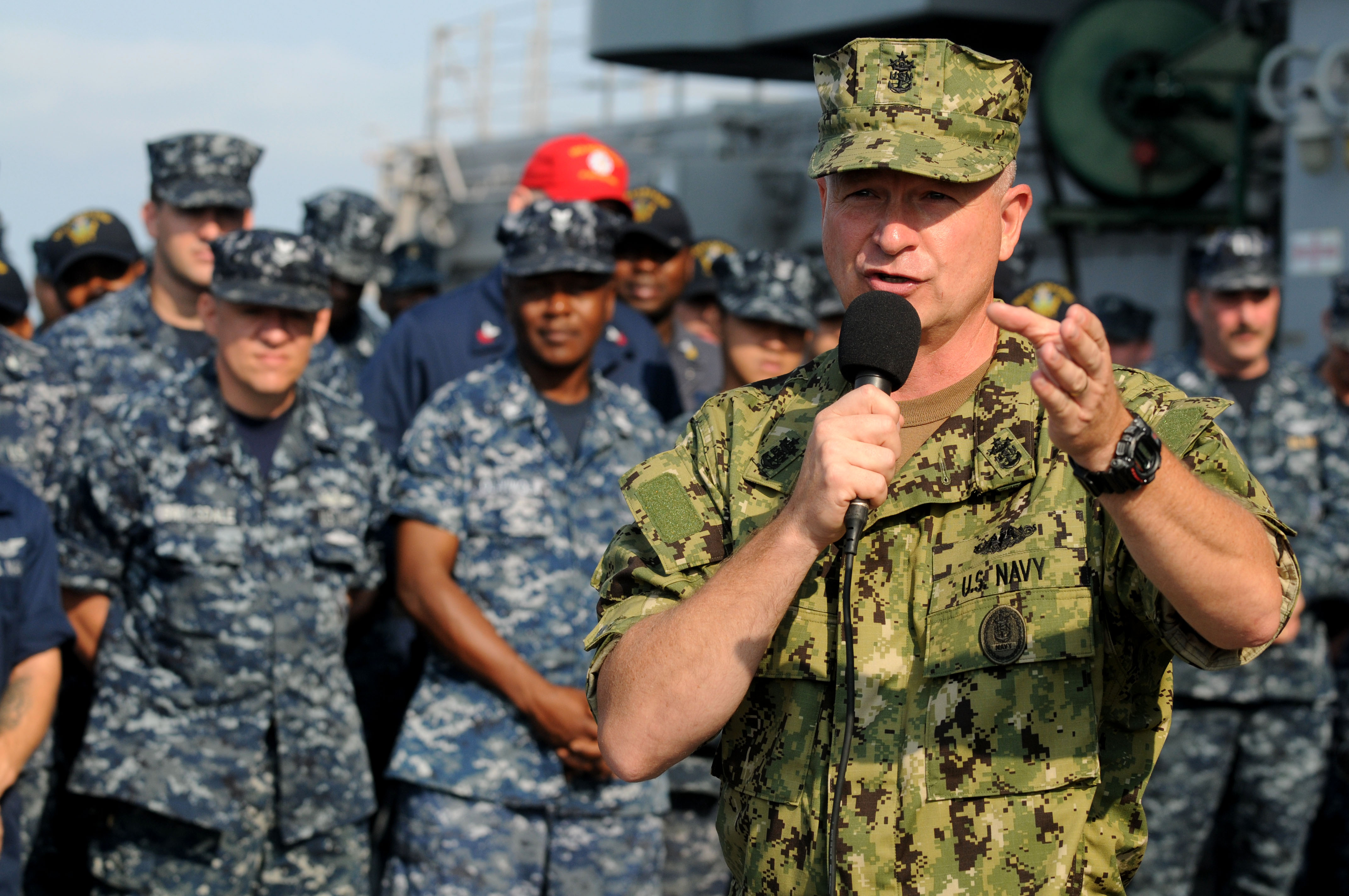
Master Chief Petty Officer of the U.S. Navy Rick D. West in August 2010, wearing an early version of the NWU Type III featuring rank insignia on the collars and not on the chest

=== 2003–2004: Development ===
From February 26, 2003, to September 20, 2003, the U.S. Navy's Vice Chief of Naval Operations, William J. Fallon, directed the U.S. Navy to create a survey group under the name of "Task Force Uniform" to begin conducting a study of the U.S. Navy's then-current uniforms to see if any of them should be replaced by newer, more contemporary ones. From this study and subsequent initiative, the NWU and Navy Service Uniform (NSU) were created.

More than a year after the Task Force Uniform initiative was created, early versions of the NWU, still in its prototype stage, were publicly unveiled before a crowd of sailors for the first time on October 18, 2004, aboard USS Iwo Jima, by Master Chief Petty Officer of the U.S. Navy Terry D. Scott. Overall, the NWU prototypes that were showcased in late 2004 and early 2005 were similar to the BDU and DCU uniforms used by the U.S. Army and U.S. Air Force at the time.

=== 2005–2006: Testing ===
There were originally four prototype variants of the NWU, two of each which had their own different camouflage patterns. One variant, known by the developmental moniker of NWU-C, used a more traditional blob-like "analog" camouflage pattern that was essentially a blue, black, and gray version of the US Woodland. The other prototype variant, known as the NWU-D, used a pixelated blue-dominant camouflage pattern reminiscent of the U.S. Marine Corps' MARPAT and U.S. Army's Universal Camouflage Pattern. Two uniforms featured rounded collars like those found on the Marine Corps Combat Utility Uniform, the other featured sharper, pointed collars reminiscent of those found on the Battle Dress Uniform and Desert Camouflage Uniform. Two variants featured pockets on the sleeves near the shoulders and removed the lower row of pockets on the blouse, whereas two other variants kept the lower row of pockets and featured no sleeve pockets, like on the BDU and DCU. The NWU-D variant was selected to become the NWU.

In addition to the different pockets, different collars, and different camouflage patterns proposed, there were two different variants of hats proposed as well. One hat was a flat-topped patrol cap reminiscent of that used on the U.S. Army's BDU. The other was an eight-point utility cover like those worn by the U.S. Marines.

The early NWU prototype uniforms were tested throughout late 2004 and into 2005 over a period of six months by a test group of select U.S. Navy sailors. In early 2006, the U.S. Navy's Chief of Naval Operations, Michael G. Mullen, selected the pixelated blue camouflage pattern with pointed blouse collars and an eight-point cover to become the NWU's finished product.

=== 2008–2009: Introduction ===
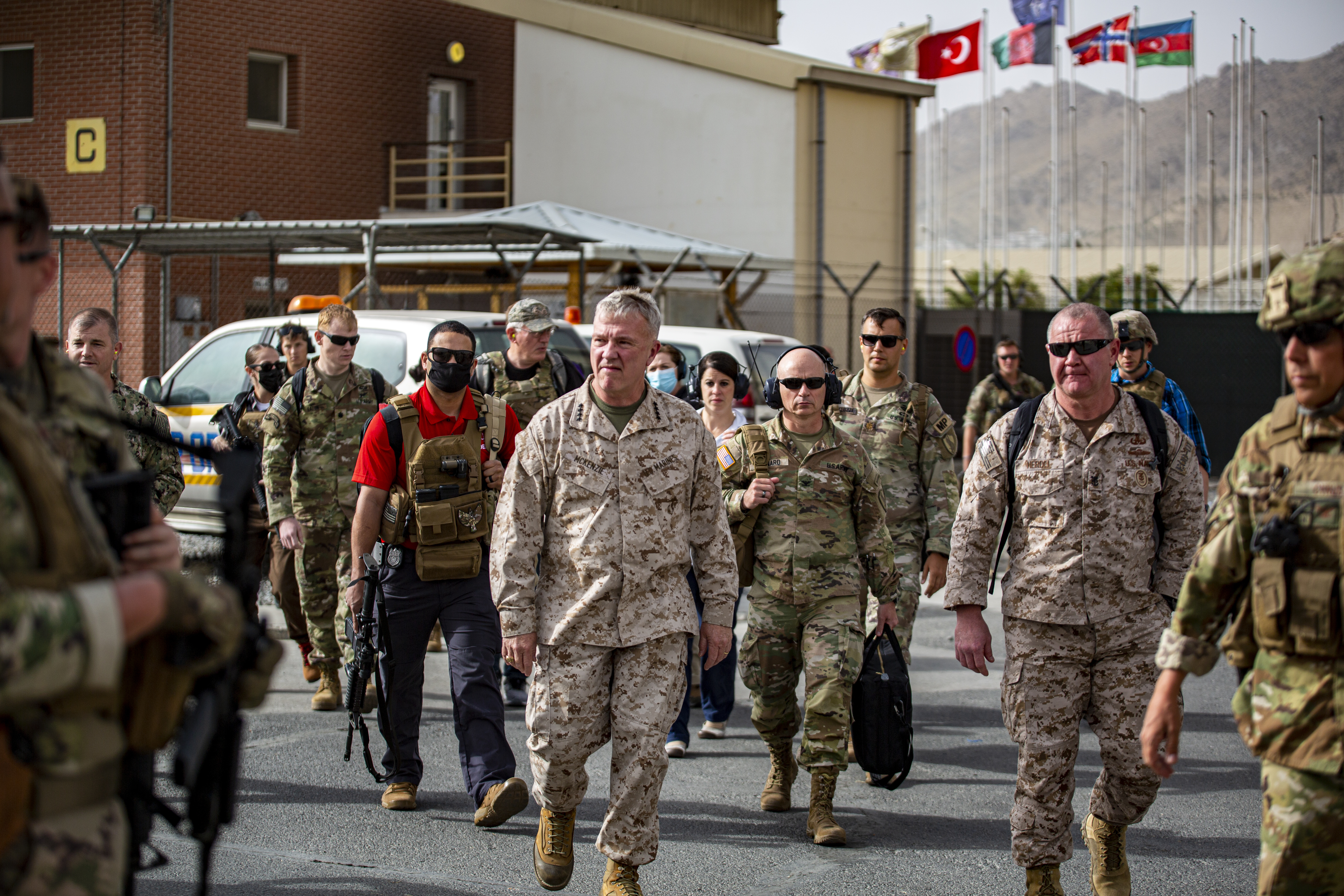
A sailor wears NWU Type II (at right) in Afghanistan in 2021, compared to a Marine in desert MARPAT (center).

The NWU Type I, known then as simply the NWU, began being made available to U.S. Navy sailors in late 2008 and early 2009. It completely replaced most of the U.S. Navy's other working uniforms by late 2010. In March 2006, the U.S. Navy set the introduction date for the NWU as late 2007, but that date was ultimately pushed back by almost a year to late 2008 and early 2009.

=== 2010–2011: Expansion ===
In January 2010, the Navy began using new camouflage patterns for the Navy Working Uniform derived from MARPAT, named Type II and Type III, desert and woodland, respectively. The new patterns were approved the previous year, in 2009. These patterns are overall darker than their respective MARPAT progenitors, modified with different color shades and a vertically aligned pixel pattern for the woodland version, as opposed the horizontal alignment of woodland MARPAT. The additional patterns addressed the fact that the blue and grey Type I pattern was not meant for a tactical environment. Rank insignia is embroidered and worn on a tab in the center of the torso, name and "U.S. Navy" tapes were embroidered in brown (Type II) or black (Type III). Further rules were detailed when NAVADMIN 374/09 was released: the Type II was restricted for wear to Naval Special Warfare personnel, while Type III was restricted to Navy ground units until late 2016.

=== 2016–2019: Reorganization ===
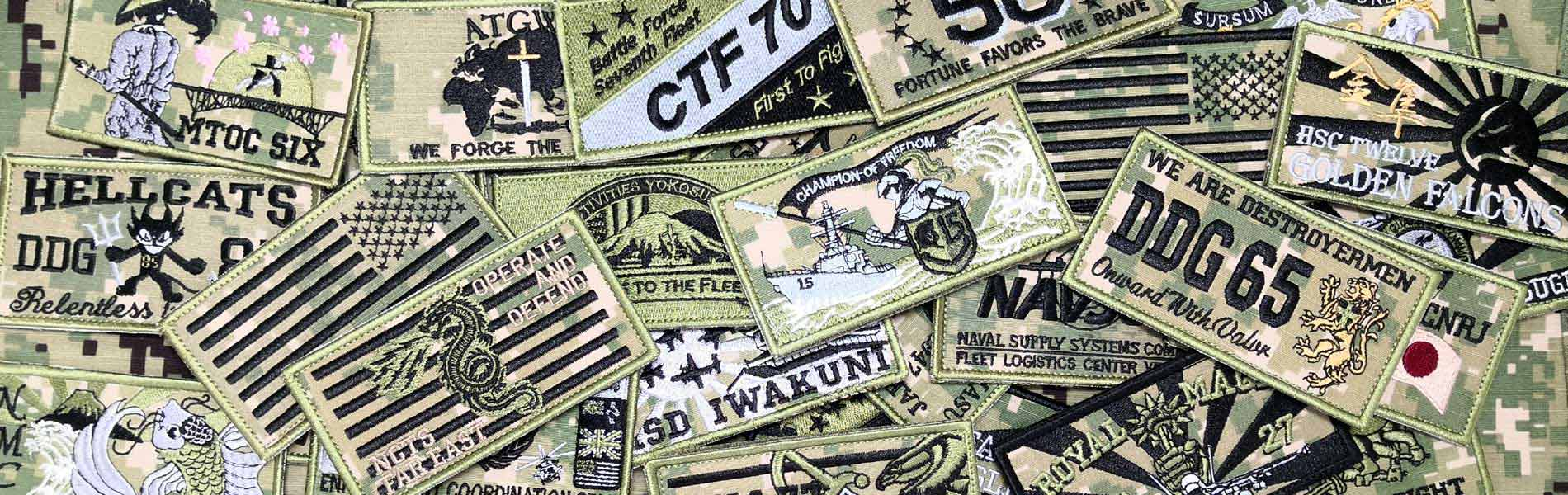
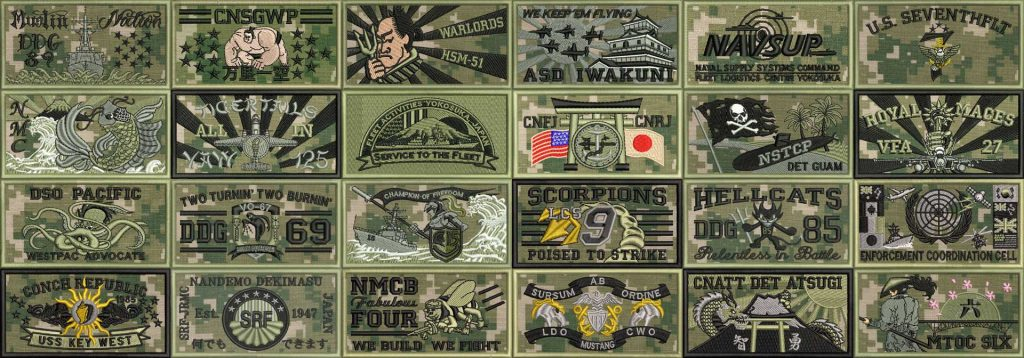
Examples of "command patches" worn on the left sleeve of the NWU Type III in place of the "First Navy Jack" flag patch.

In August 2016 the U.S. Navy announced that it will be eliminating the NWU Type I in favor of the Type III which completely replaced it on October 1, 2019, for wear as the standard working uniform for all Navy personnel ashore. Type III NWUs began being sold across the U.S. and issued to new U.S. Navy recruits and officer candidates from October 2017 onward, with production of the NWU Type I being ended. The Type II will remain restricted to wear by Naval Special Warfare sailors in arid desert environments.

The New York Naval Militia mirrored the Navy's policy of phasing out the NWU Type I in favor of the NWU Type III. The Ohio Naval Militia automatically follows the regulations set forth by the Department of the Navy and will phase into the new uniform on the same timescale as the Navy.

In 2018, the eight-point cover used with the Type III NWU began featuring the Anchor, Constitution and Eagle (ACE) logo in place of the rank or rate insignia previously worn, similar to the Eagle-Globe-Anchor insignia is worn on the eight-point covers of the U.S. Marine Corps' combat utility uniforms. In October 2019, the ACE logo completely replaced rank insignia on the NWU Type III's eight-point cover.

== Future ==
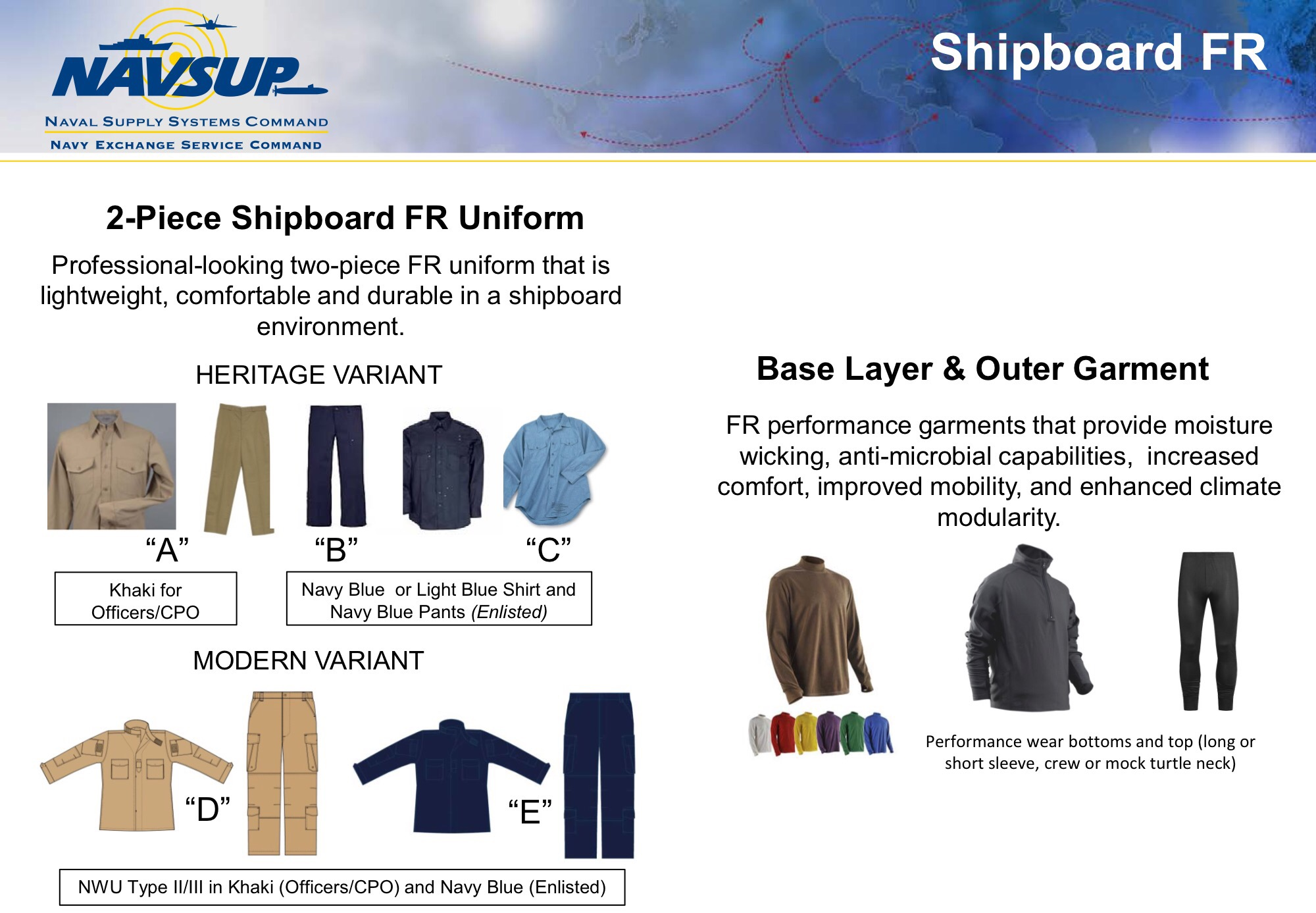
2015 infographic showing uniform prototypes of possible replacements for the IFRV coverall (the uniform which replaced the NWU Type I for use aboard warships)

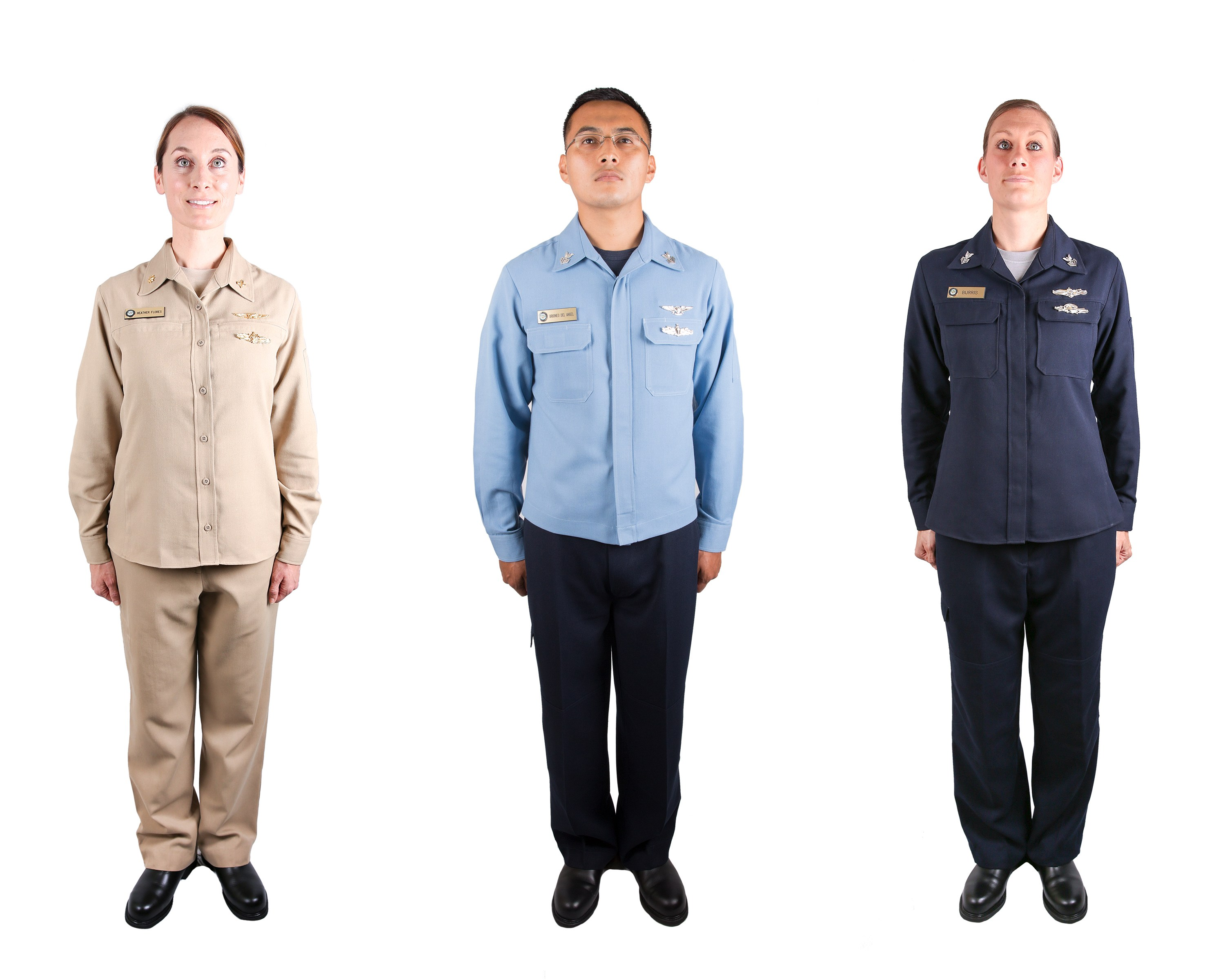
U.S. Navy sailors in 2018 modeling prototype uniforms of possible replacements for the IFRV coverall

The U.S. Navy's original goal of developing a single working uniform for wear shipboard and ashore, for which the NWU Type I was found to be unsuitable because of its lack of flame resistance, has largely been abandoned. With the NWU Type III having become the main shore uniform, the U.S. Navy continues to work to develop a new two-piece shipboard working uniform, prototypes of which were tested from May to September 2018. For the time being, sailors wear an improved flame-resistant variant of the coverall, known as the IFRV.

The U.S. Navy tested four prototypes to replace the IFRV coveralls. Three were based on the former "wash khaki" officer working uniform and enlisted utilities worn until 2010, and the other was based on the NWU Type III though in tan and blue instead of camouflage.

== Users ==
- United States :-
  - United States Army: AOR1 was briefly worn by Delta Force from 2006 to 2010.
  - United States Navy: NWU Type II & Type III were adopted as the current camouflage uniform of the Navy since 2010. As of 2017, NWU Type III is worn standard by sailors as well as special operations forces such as SEALs, DEVGRU, Seabees and EOD units, while NWU Type II is primarily for the SEALs and DEVGRU. NWU Type I was formerly used by the U.S. Navy from 2009 to 2019 when replaced by NWU Type III variant.
  - United States Air Force: AOR1 had been worn by the 24th Special Tactics Squadron of the United States Air Force Special Operations Command (AFSOC).
  - United States Coast Guard: AOR2 is worn by members of the Coast Guard's Port Security Units as well as those serving in PATSFORSWA. Additionally, the NWU pattern is the basis of the new Coast Guard Working Uniform ("CGWU"), which will be replacing the Operational Dress Uniform beginning in 2023.

== See also ==
- Uniforms of the United States Navy
- Airman Battle Uniform, the U.S. Air Force's former equivalent to the NWU
- Army Combat Uniform, the U.S. Army and U.S. Air Force's equivalent to the NWU
- Marine Corps Combat Utility Uniform, the U.S. Marine Corps' equivalent to the NWU
- Operational Dress Uniform, the U.S. Coast Guard's equivalent to the NWU
