= Uniforms of the United States Coast Guard =

Uniforms worn by the US Coast Guard

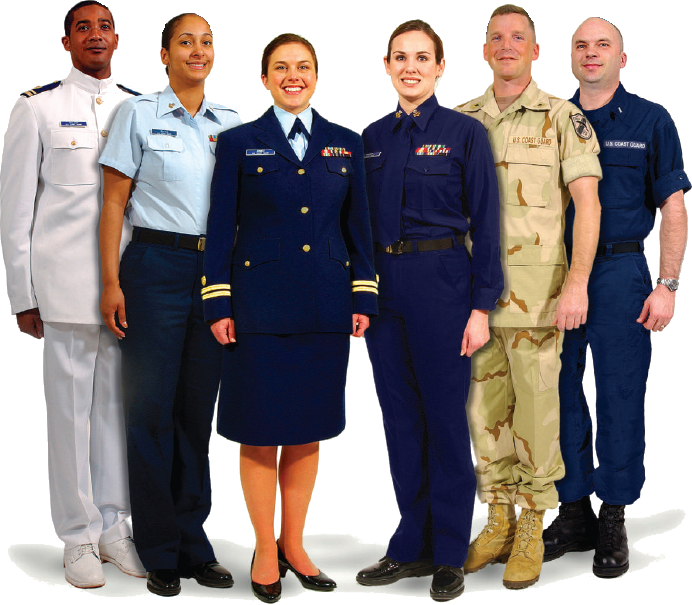
Photo showing a variety of Coast Guard uniforms. From Left: Service Dress White, Tropical Blue, Service Dress Blue, Winter Dress Blue, Camouflage Utility Uniform, Operational Dress Uniform

The Uniforms of the United States Coast Guard include dress uniforms, daily service uniforms, working uniforms, and uniforms for special situations, which have varied throughout the history of the service.

Historically, Coast Guard uniforms resembled U.S. Navy uniforms, but they began to diverge in 1974 under Admiral Chester R. Bender's leadership. Today, the Coast Guard has fewer uniform types and variations compared to other armed services. Notable uniforms include the Service Dress Blue, Tropical Blue, and Operational Dress Uniform. Special uniform situations apply to Coast Guard cadets, the Coast Guard Pipe Band, and other roles requiring non-standard uniforms or insignia.

== History ==
For most of the Coast Guard's history its uniforms largely mirrored the style of U.S. Navy uniforms, distinguishable only by their insignia. In 1974, under the leadership of Admiral Chester R. Bender, the initial versions of the current Coast Guard Service Dress Blue and Tropical Blue uniforms (dubbed "Bender's Blues") were introduced. These uniforms not only differed from U.S. Navy uniforms, they deviated from several common conventions in naval/maritime uniforms generally; notably, they largely dispensed with distinctions between officer and enlisted uniforms other than in insignia, eliminating the sailor suit and sailor cap formerly worn by enlisted members in favor of a common service dress uniform for all ranks. Rank insignia remained consistent with the naval pattern and some distinctly-nautical items such as the pea coat, bridge coat, officer's sword, and dress white uniforms remained.

Today, the Coast Guard's uniforms remain among the simplest of any branch of the armed forces, with fewer total uniforms and uniform variants than the other armed services. There are only three uniforms that typically serve as standard uniforms of the day—the Operational Dress Uniform, Tropical Blue, and Service Dress Blue (B).

== Service uniforms ==
The Service Dress Blue is the standard uniform of the day for office environments and is considered equivalent to civilian business attire. The uniform consists of a blue four-pocket single breasted jacket, matching trousers, and a tie of the same shade as the jacket. There are two variants. The less common but more formal "A" variant includes a white shirt and a combination cap (or "combo cover" in common Coast Guard slang) is always worn with it. The more common "B" variant includes a light blue shirt and is worn with either the combination cap or a blue garrison cap matching the coat. Officer and enlisted rank insignia are sewn onto the jacket sleeve in the same manner as Navy uniforms. Rank insignia must also be worn on the blue shirt as part of the "B" variant by officers (shoulder boards) and enlisted members (collar devices).

The Service Dress White "choker" uniforms for officers are identical to those worn by U.S. Navy officers (aside from service-specific buttons, insignia, and sword design). These are typically used for formal parades and change-of-command ceremonies in warmer seasons and climates. Unlike the Navy, these uniforms are authorized only for officers and warrant officers, not chief petty officers. For similar occasions the enlisted members wear Tropical Blue, Service Dress Blue, or Full Dress Blue, depending on the climate.

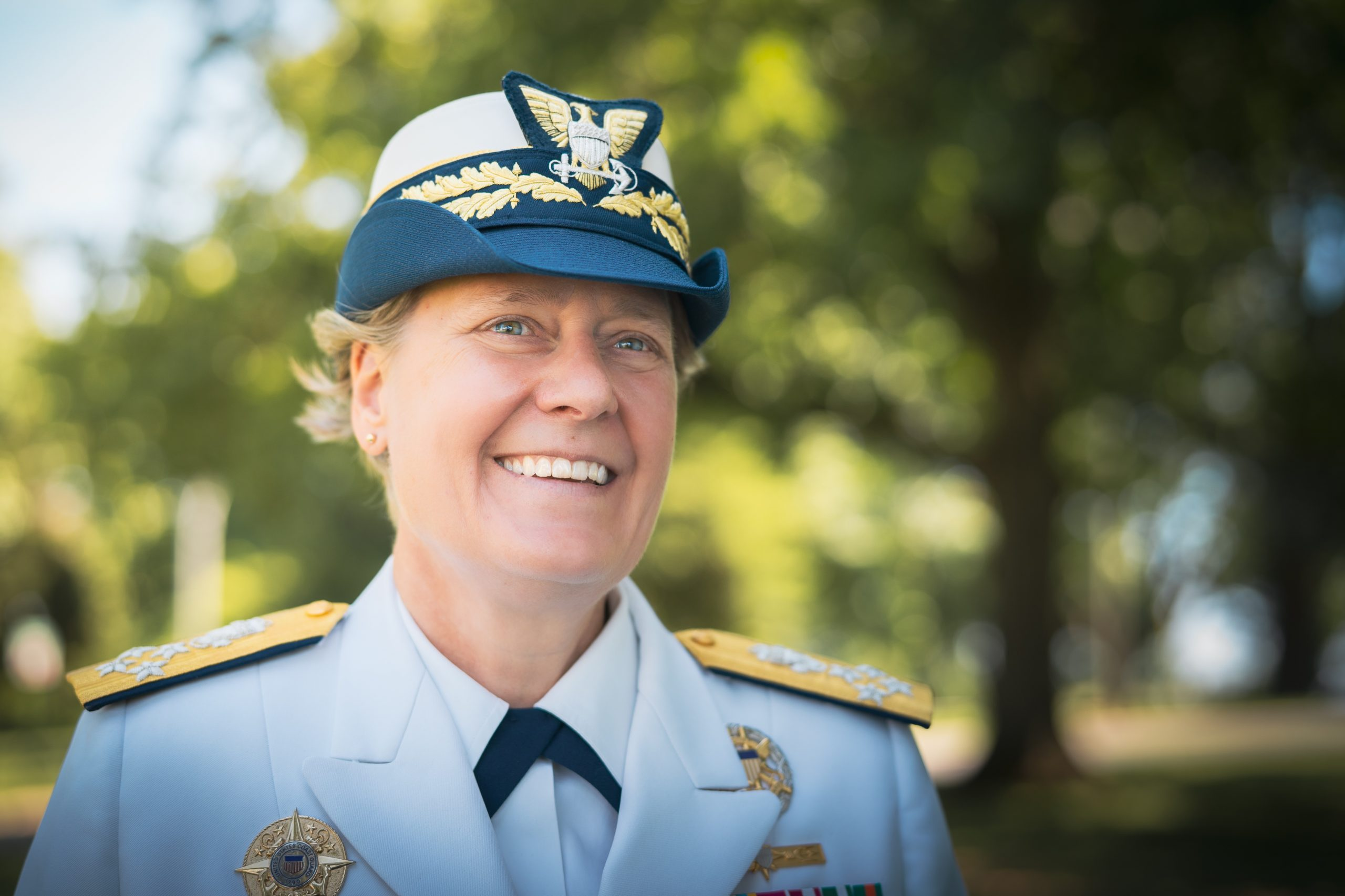
Admiral Linda L. Fagan in Service Dress White Uniform

The women's version of the Service Dress White uniform differs from the men's version chiefly in having a rounded collar with overlying half-peaked lapels, and the regulation combination cap has a more upswept side brim.

The Tropical Blue uniform is the standard uniform for office wear in warmer seasons and climates in lieu of Service Dress Blue (but not to functions where civilian dress is coat and tie, in which case Service Dress Blue should be worn). The Tropical Blue uniform omits the dress coat and instead features a short sleeve light blue shirt on which ribbons and devices are worn in the same manner as on the SDB coat, and rank is indicated on shoulder boards (officers and warrant officers) or collar devices (enlisted members). A "Tropical Blue Long Sleeve" uniform was approved in 2019, which includes a long sleeved shirt, necktie, and tie bar, and omits ribbons but allows one breast badge. While the name designates this uniform as a variant of Tropical Blue, it is essentially Service Dress Blue B with the coat removed and the added requirement of a nametag above the right shirt pocket. Uniform regulations already allowed that, where Service Dress Blue B is the standard uniform of the day in office environments, the coat could be removed during the work day. Both the short and long-sleeved light blue shirts are the same style and color as used by the U.S. Air Force.

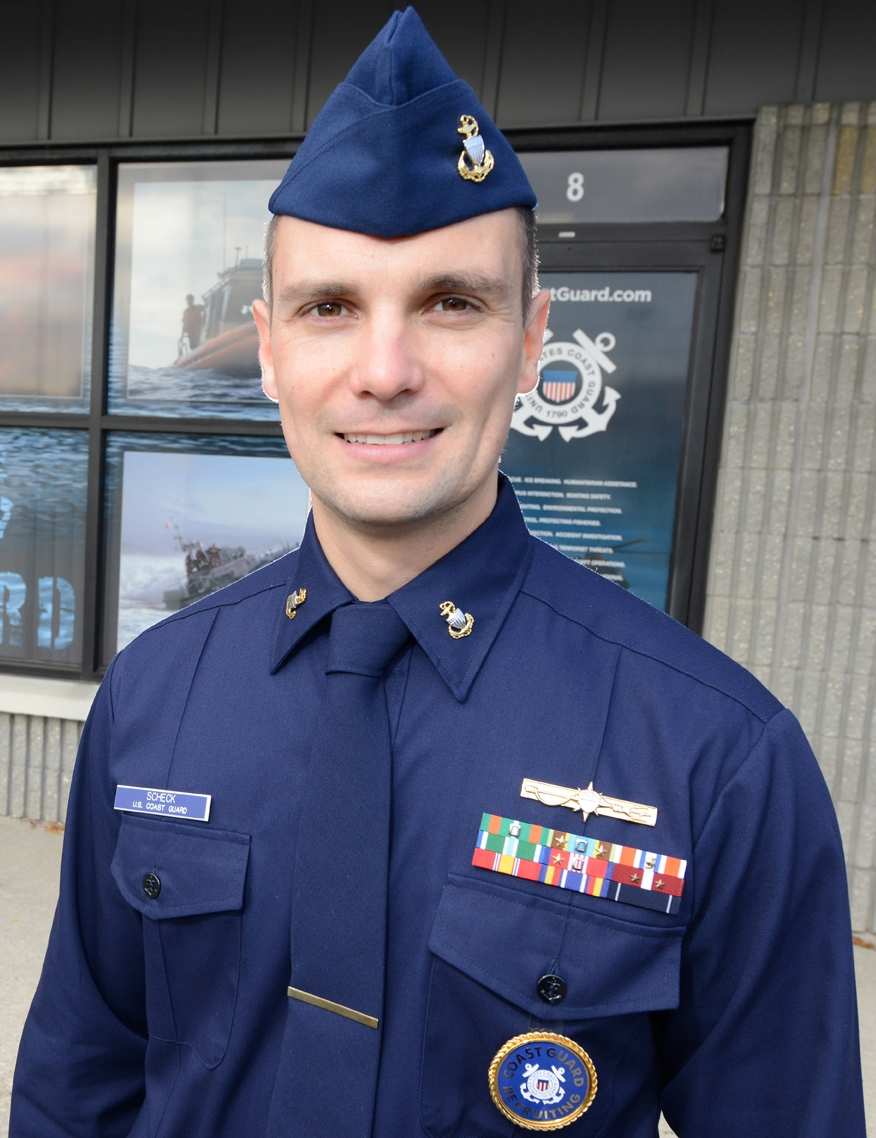
A U.S. Coast Guard recruiter wearing the Winter Dress Blue uniform with garrison cap

The Winter Dress Blue uniform is an optional variant of the Service Dress Blue B. This uniform was originally only authorized during winter months from 1 November to 31 March, but has since been authorized to be worn year round in situations where the formality of the B jacket is not required. It consists of a long-sleeve dark blue shirt of the same color as the service dress trousers, without shoulder loops. It is worn with the blue necktie and rank insignia pins on the collar (unless a sweater is also worn, in which case the rank is worn on the sweater instead).

All blue service and dress uniforms are worn with a black, plain-toe blucher shoe (but called an "oxford shoe" in regulations) or, optionally, black pumps or flats for females. Patent leather versions are authorized. White shoes are worn with the dress white uniforms.

Several optional forms of outerwear may be worn with some or all of these uniforms, all in dark blue, including: a windbreaker; a "wooly pully" commando-style sweater; a cardigan sweater (the same worn by the U.S. Air Force); a trench coat; a waterproof parka; and, for officers, a double-breasted bridge coat (similar to a pea coat but knee-length).

== Dress uniforms ==
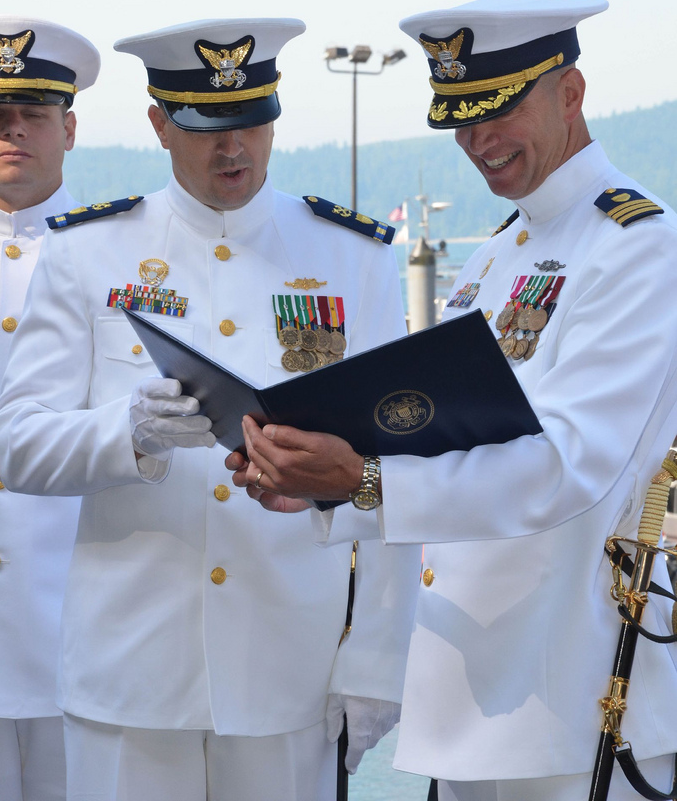
A Coast Guard chief warrant officer (CWO2, left) and an officer (commander, O-5, right) wearing Full Dress Whites

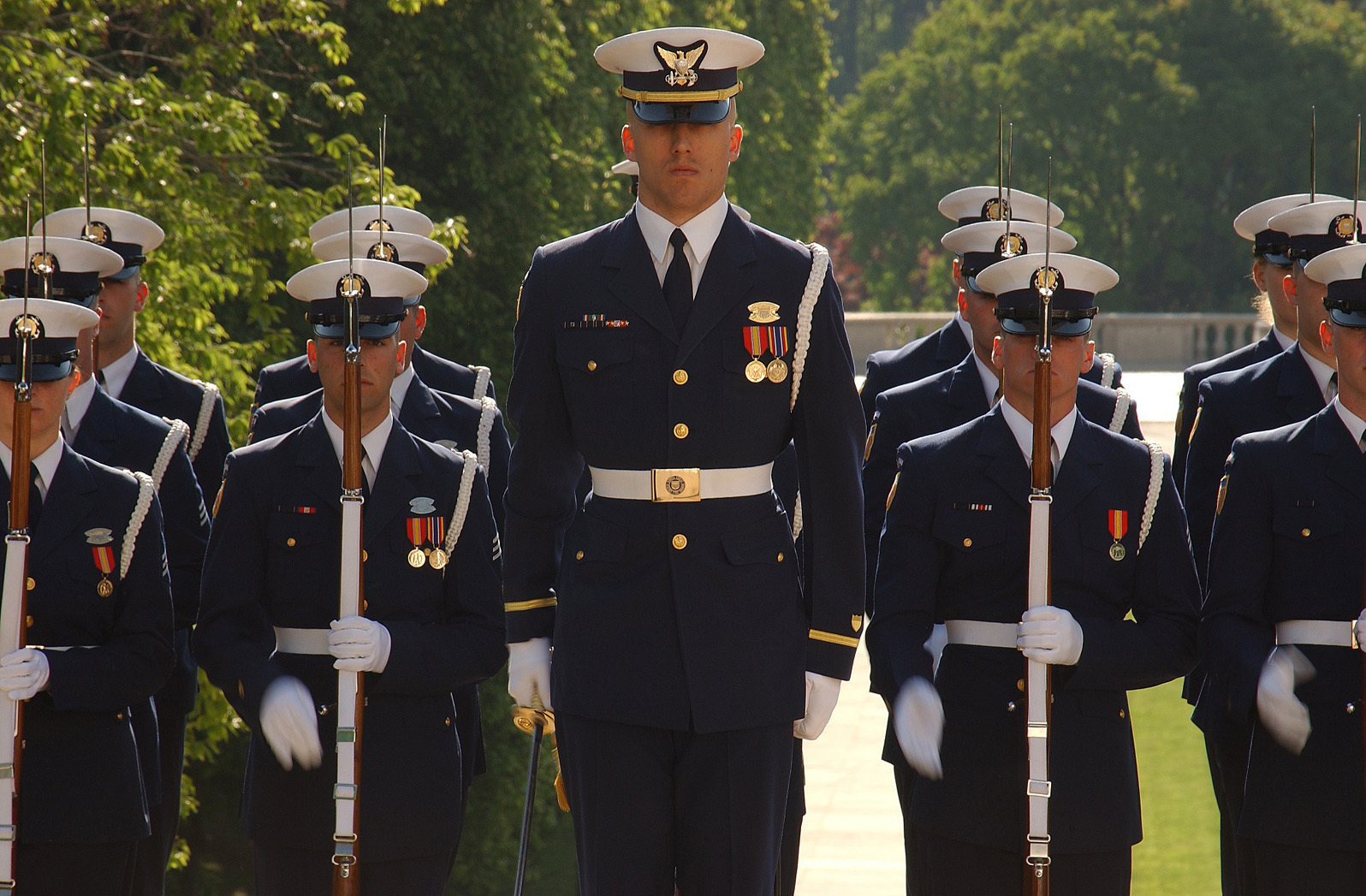
The United States Coast Guard Ceremonial Honor Guard wears Full Dress Blue with white gun belts at the Tomb of Unknown Soldier

The Full Dress Blue uniform is essentially the same as Service Dress Blue A, except that it is worn with a full-size medals instead of ribbons, white gloves, and (for officers) a sword. The name tag is not worn and any ribbon that does not have a corresponding medal is worn over the right breast pocket. Similarly, the Full Dress White uniform consists of the Service Dress White with the same accouterments as the Full Dress Blue uniform. For both uniforms, ribbons without a corresponding medal are worn above the right breast pocket in lieu of the name tag normally worn in that position on service uniforms.

There are two sets of dinner dress uniforms worn for formal (black tie) evening ceremonies. The first set, Dinner Dress Blue and Dinner Dress White are essentially the same as Full Dress Blue and Full Dress White but miniature medals and badges are worn, neither ribbons nor a name tag is worn above the right breast pocket, and (for Dinner Dress Blue) a black bow tie is worn rather than the blue necktie.

The second set of dinner dress uniforms, dubbed Dinner Dress Blue Jacket and Dinner Dress White Jacket are identical to the corresponding U.S. Navy uniforms but with Coast Guard buttons and insignia. These uniforms are required for officers O-3 and above but optional for other members. Due to the expense of these uniforms and the fact that they are rarely called-for, few junior enlisted members purchase them and wear the above-described Dinner Dress Blue uniform instead.

A Formal Dress Blue uniform is authorized for senior officers (O-6 and above) as the equivalent of civilian white tie. It is essentially the Dinner Dress Blue Jacket uniform but with a white bow tie and white formal waistcoat replacing the black bow tie and gold cummerbund. It is exceptionally rarely worn, with the only likely occasions for wear being a White House state dinner or similar event.

== Working uniforms ==
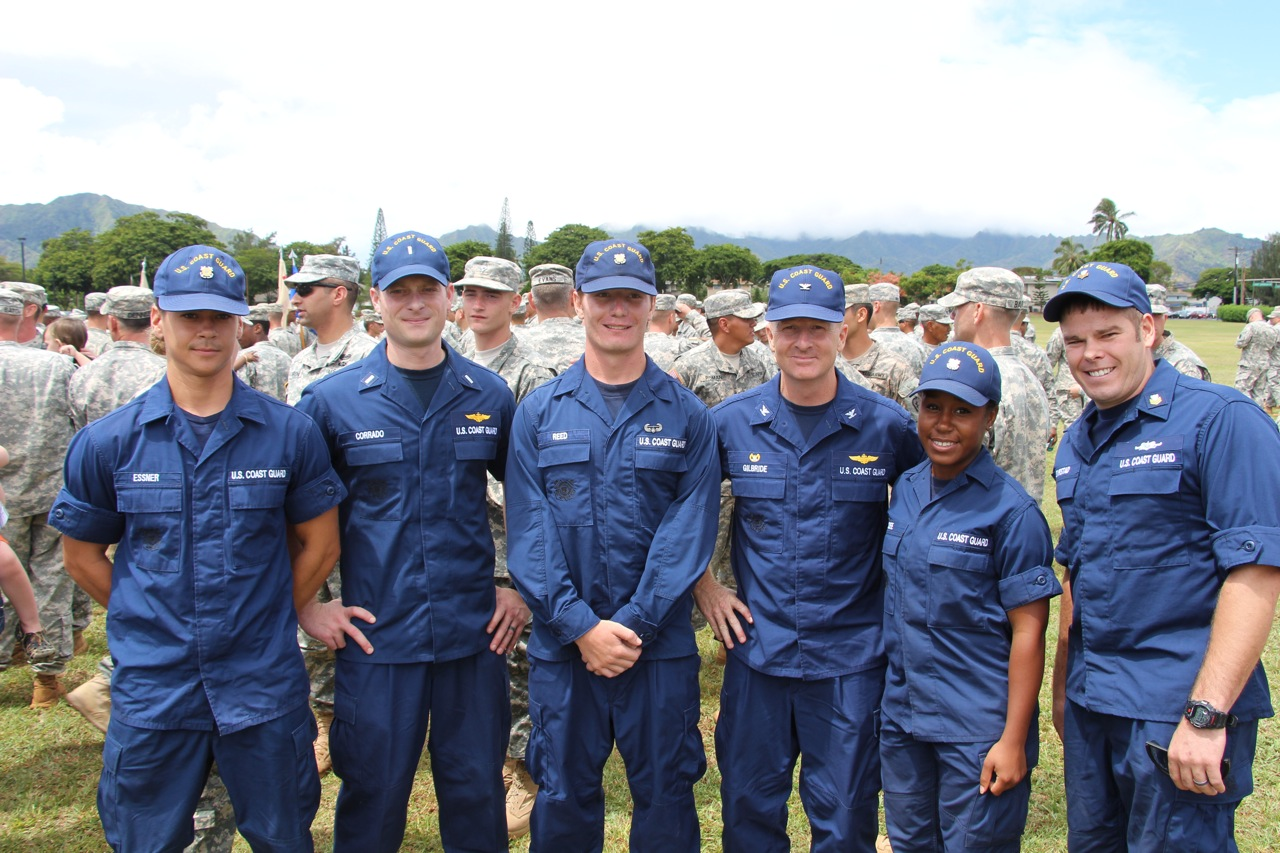
Coast Guardsmen in 2013 wearing ODUs

The current working uniform of the Coast Guard is the Operational Dress Uniform (ODU). The ODU may be worn year-round primarily as a field utility and watchstanding uniform, but may also be worn in an office environment where appropriate. The ODU is similar, both in function and style, to the Battle Dress Uniform previously worn by all branches of the U.S. Armed Forces. However, the ODU is in a solid dark blue with no camouflage pattern and does not have lower pockets on the blouse.

The ODU was introduced in the early 2000s as a replacement for the previous Working Blue uniform, which was an all-dark-blue cotton twill uniform with sew-on name tapes and collar devices, worn with a baseball cap and black boots (or boat shoes).

The first generation ODU, in service from 2004 to 2012, was worn with the blouse tucked into the trousers. The current, second generation ("untucked") ODU is worn with the blouse untucked and has black Coast Guard insignia embroidered on the right breast pocket.

The standard footwear is a black composite-toe boot. Brown boat shoes may be allowed for daily wear aboard ship unless boots are required for safety reasons.

The standard headgear is a baseball-style cap with "U.S. Coast Guard," in gold lettering embroidered in an arch at the top front. Units may also authorize unit-specific ball caps. Formerly these varied in style but regulations now specify that the ball cap must be the standard style with the unit name (usually abbreviated) embroidered in a single straight line just above the visor. For E-4 and above, pin-on rank insignia is worn centered on the front of the cap.

For cold weather, the standard outerwear worn with ODU is a "Foul Weather Parka," which comes with a removable fleece liner that may be worn as a stand-alone lightweight jacket. A rank insignia tab is included on the center front of the parka and liner. The Foul Weather Parka replaced several more traditional styles of outerwear (notably the reefer jacket) as the only authorized outerwear for the ODU, and is also permitted with several service uniform styles. A "Cold Weather Cap" in the style of an ushanka is also authorized for extreme cold environments.

The ODU's simple style and practicality as a working uniform has led the U.S. Public Health Service and the NOAA Corps to adopt ODU variants as standard working uniforms. Some Navy personnel also advocated adoption of the ODU as a standard shipboard uniform for the Navy, rather than the unpopular Navy Working Uniform Type I.

In 2019, Coast Guard Uniform Board No. 48 announced that a new working uniform to replace the ODU was in development. Dubbed the "Coast Guard Utility" uniform, initial test designs are based on the Navy Working Uniform Type III but in solid blue color similar to the current ODU. Uniform Board No. 48 also announced that an alternative top similar to the Army Combat Shirt would be developed.

When engaged in flight operations, Coast Guardsmen wear the standard CWU-27/p flight suit worn by the other branches of the U.S. Armed Forces, in sage green (formerly in blue). A leather name tag is worn above the left breast pocket. Above the right breast pocket, where other branches typically wear a unit/command patch, Coast Guardsmen wear a rectangular white patch with a blue border, the Coast Guard racing stripe, and the words "UNITED STATES COAST GUARD" in black. A unit patch is worn on the right sleeve and an American flag patch is worn on the left sleeve. For officers, rank insignia may be sewn onto the shoulders. Flight suits are considered "organizational clothing," not standard uniforms, and are not supposed to be worn outside of flight activities.

Coast Guard personnel serving in expeditionary combat units such as Port Security Units or Law Enforcement Detachments, and Coast Guard personnel deployed overseas (e.g. as part of PATFORSWA) may wear the Navy Working Uniform Type III or the Army Combat Uniform with distinctive Coast Guard insignia.

== Special uniform situations ==
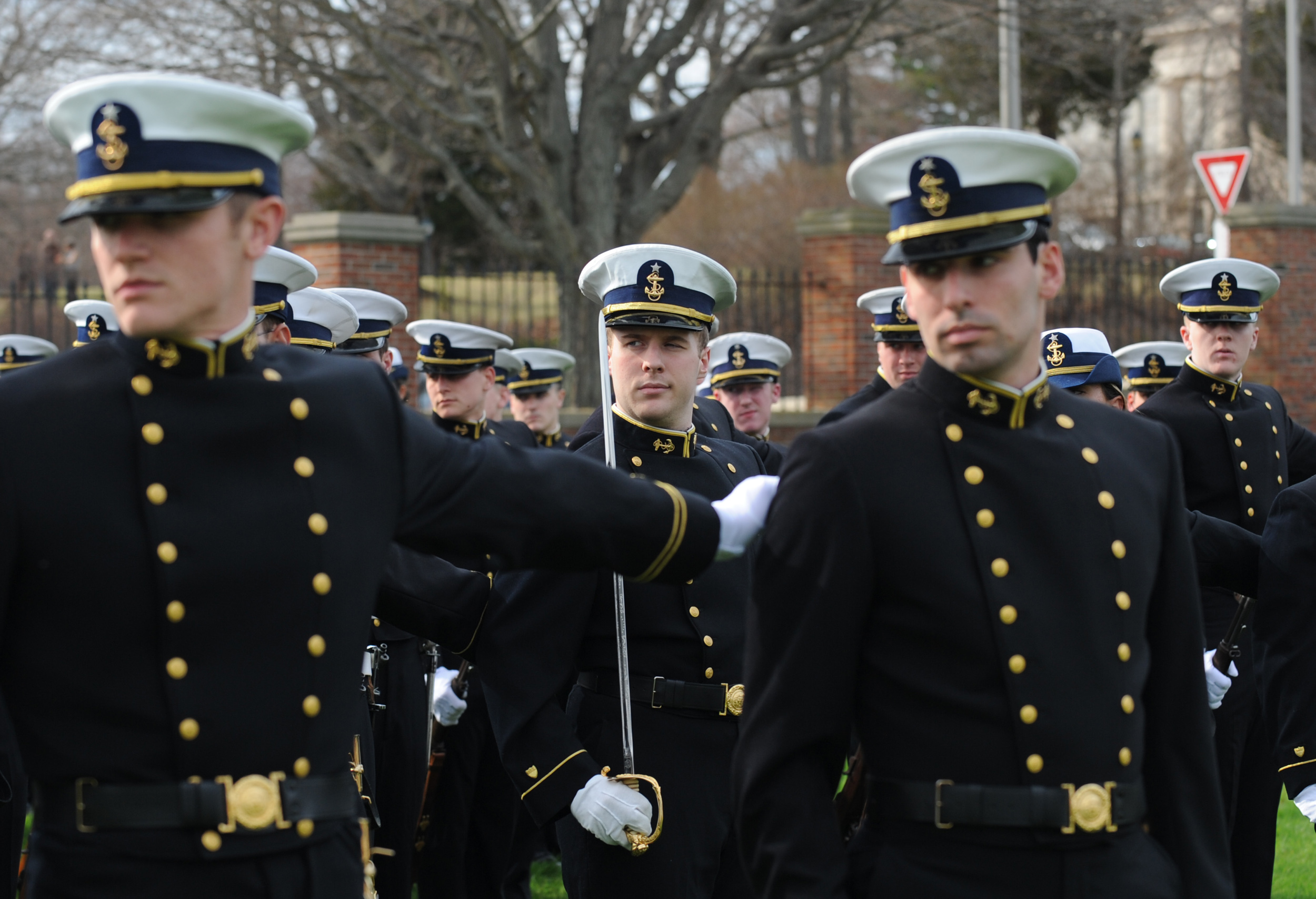
Coast Guard cadets wearing Full Dress Blue (B) uniforms

Coast Guardsmen serving in certain billets will wear non-standard uniforms, uniform items, and insignia. For example, company commanders (the Coast Guard's equivalent of drill sergeants) at Training Center Cape May wear the traditional Smokey Bear-style campaign hat.

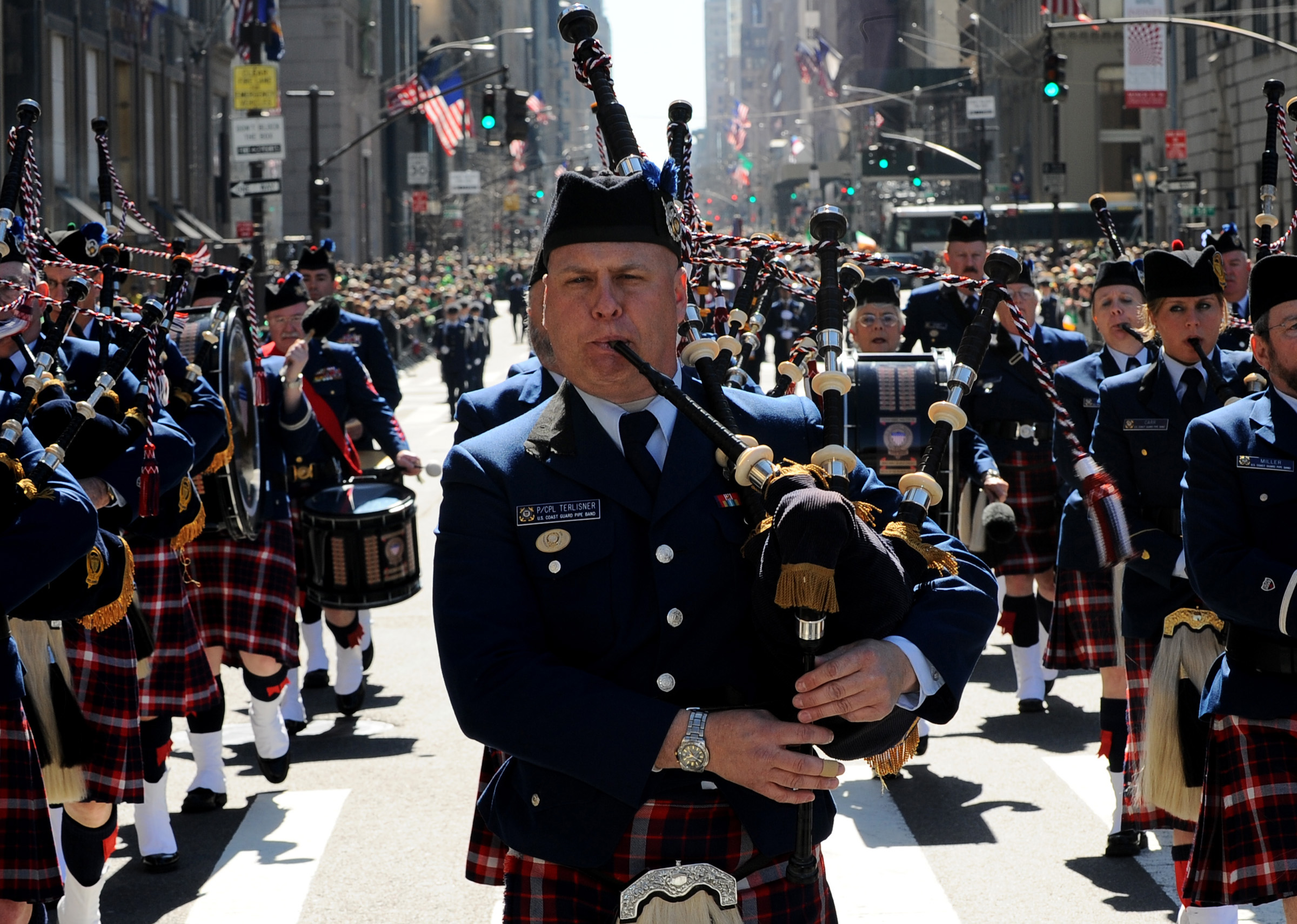
The U.S. Coast Guard Pipe Band in New York during the 2010 St. Patrick's Day Parade

The Coast Guard Pipe Band, a special musical unit composed of active, reserve and auxiliary members, wears a modified form of highland dress, including kilt and sporran. It is, along with the Band of the Air Force Reserve Pipe Band, one of only two kilted units in the United States military, excluding those maintained by state defense forces and service academies. The band's kilt is patterned in the official U.S. Coast Guard tartan, which is registered with the Scottish Register of Tartans and based on the Hamilton tartan (in honor of the founder of the Revenue-Marine, Alexander Hamilton).

Cadets at the U.S. Coast Guard Academy wear standard Coast Guard uniforms, but also wear two different styles of parade dress uniforms, similar to those worn by Midshipmen at the U.S. Naval Academy. Full Dress Blue (B) consists of black blouses with banded collars and double rows of buttons, worn with matching black trousers and a white peaked hat. Full Dress Blue (A) substitutes white trousers in lieu of black.

== See also ==
- Uniforms of the United States Armed Forces
