= New York Naval Militia =

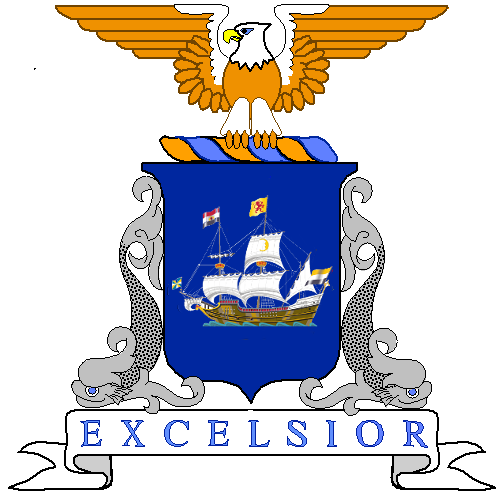
- New York Naval Militia Insignia
- Active: 1891–present
- Country: United States of America
- Allegiance: State of New York
- Type: Naval militia
- Size: 2,800 (approximately)
- Part of: New York State Division of Military and Naval Affairs
- March: "The New York Naval Militia March"
- Website: dmna.ny.gov/nynm/

Commanders
- Governor of New York: Kathy Hochul
- Commander: Rear Admiral MaryEtta Nolan
- Deputy Commander: Captain Jay Dutcher
- Senior Enlisted Leader: Master gunnery sergeant Salvatore Rignola

The New York Naval Militia is the naval militia of the state of New York, and is under the authority of the Governor of New York as Commander-In-Chief of the state's military forces. With the New York Guard, the New York Army National Guard and New York Air National Guard, it is under the control of the New York State Division of Military and Naval Affairs and New York's Adjutant General. It is the oldest continuously operating Naval militia in the United States.

As of September 2022, the New York Naval Militia has about 2,800 members, more than 95 percent of whom are also members of the U.S. Navy Reserve, U.S. Marine Corps Reserve, or U.S. Coast Guard Reserve.

== History ==
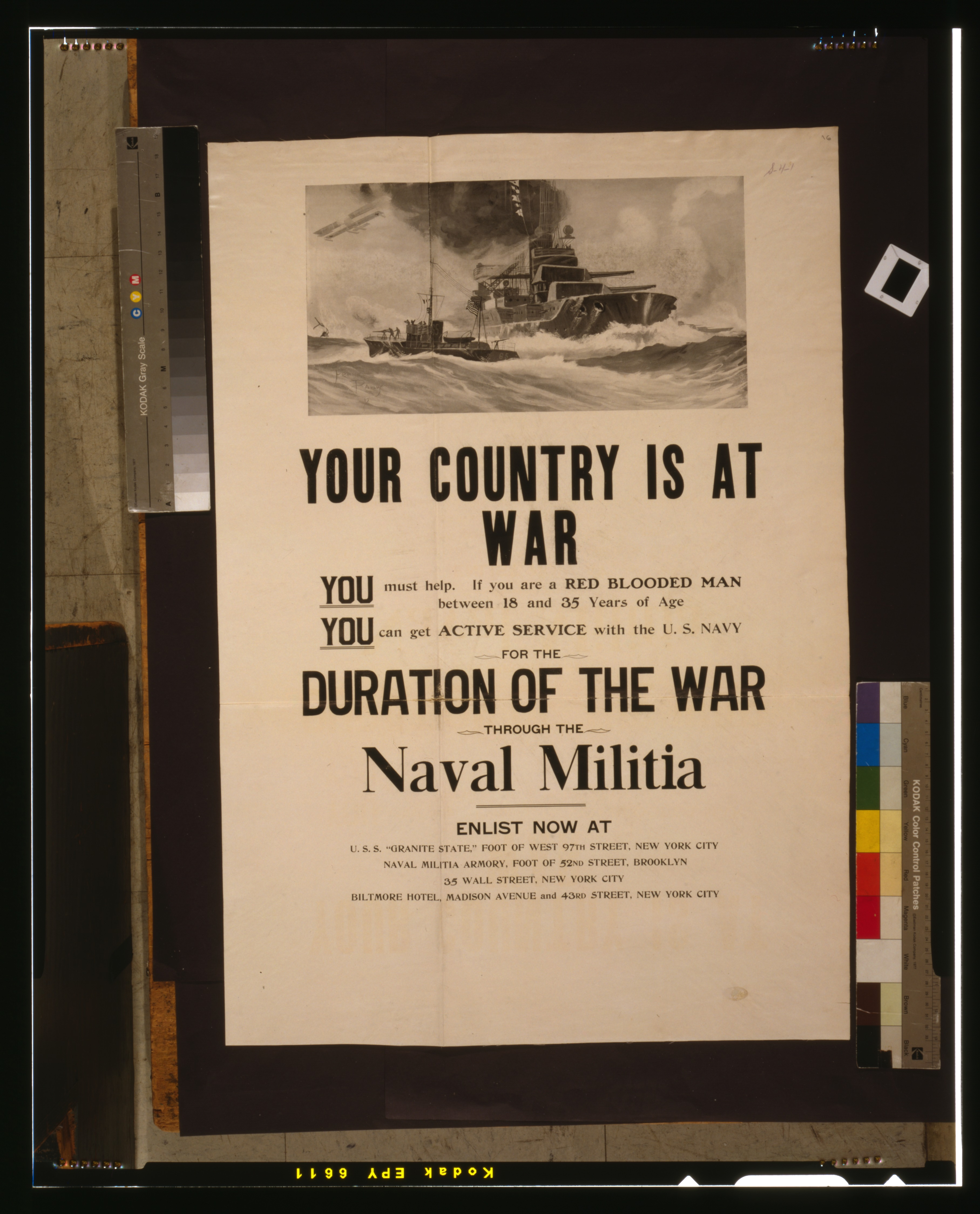
A recruitment poster for New York's naval militia from 1917

The New York Naval Militia was organized as a Provisional Naval Battalion in 1889 and was formally mustered into State service as the First Battalion, Naval Reserve Artillery, on 23 June 1891. One year later the New York Naval Militia was called to active duty to protect steam ship passengers during the 1892 cholera quarantine at Fire Island.

After the sinking of USS Maine, the New York Naval Militia sent five divisions of its 1st Battalion to fight in the Spanish–American War. New York Naval Militiamen manned two auxiliary cruisers that fought in the Battle of Santiago de Cuba, and also conducted patrols of New York Harbor.

The New York Naval Militia was activated during both World War I and World War II, as well as the Korean War.

In 1996, the New York Naval Militia was called up after the crash of TWA Flight 800 off Long Island.

In 1997, a memorandum of understanding was signed between the New York Naval Militia and the United States Coast Guard which allowed Coast Guard reservists to join the New York Naval Militia. This was formalized by a change in New York law in 1998 which also allowed up to 5 percent of the New York Naval Militia to be qualified volunteers who were not reservists.

In 2001, the state created the New York State Military Emergency Boat Service (MEBS) in an attempt to strengthen homeland security efforts, and a fleet of high-speed, all-aluminum patrol boats was built for this unit.

After the September 11 attacks, the New York Naval Militia was called up to aid in recovery efforts.

In recent years, the New York Naval Militia has mobilized in response to Hurricanes Irene (2011) and Sandy (2012), the significant Buffalo snowstorm of December 2014, and the Lake Ontario flooding of 2017 and 2019.

"The New York Naval Militia March" is the official march of the New York Naval Militia. It was composed by Major Douglas F. Hedwig of the 89th Army Band, New York Guard. MAJ Hedwig also composed the "New York Guard March", an adaption of "The Good Old N.Y.G." composed back in 1916 by MAJ Charles Clanton, dedicated to the New York Guard, another component along with the Naval Militia which form to make the New York Military Forces.

In March 2020, members of the New York Naval Militia were activated to assist in New York's response to the COVID-19 pandemic.

== Mission ==
The mission of the New York Naval Militia is to provide a trained and equipped naval force to augment New York National Guard forces during Military Support to Civil Authority operations.

== Organization ==
The New York Naval Militia is organized into three regional commands: Southern Command, encompassing Long Island, New York City, Rockland and Westchester Counties; Northern Command, encompassing the Hudson Valley, Catskill and Adirondack Mountains region; and Western Command, encompassing the vast area of the state from Jamestown to the Saint Lawrence River.

== Benefits ==
=== Tuition assistance ===
Since January 1, 1997, a current drilling federal Reservist who is an active member of the New York Naval Militia, in good standing, has been eligible to apply to receive tuition assistance, up to the cost of the State University of New York's (SUNY) maximum in-state undergraduate tuition, at any college, university, or community-technical college in the State of New York recognized and approved by the New York State Board of Regents or State University of New York through the Recruitment Incentive and Retention Program (RIRP).

=== Employment protections ===
Businesses in New York are forbidden from adopting policies that discriminate against members of the New York Naval Militia during the hiring process or after a person has already been hired. Individuals who enforce such policies or in any way discriminate against New York Naval Militia employees in regards to their employment are guilty under New York law of a misdemeanor offense. Employers in the state of New York are required under New York law to grant a leave of absence to employees who are also members of the NYNM whenever these employees are activated to take part in drill, training, or an emergency mission. Employers are then required to reinstate these employees to their previous positions of employment when they return from their deployment.

== Gallery ==
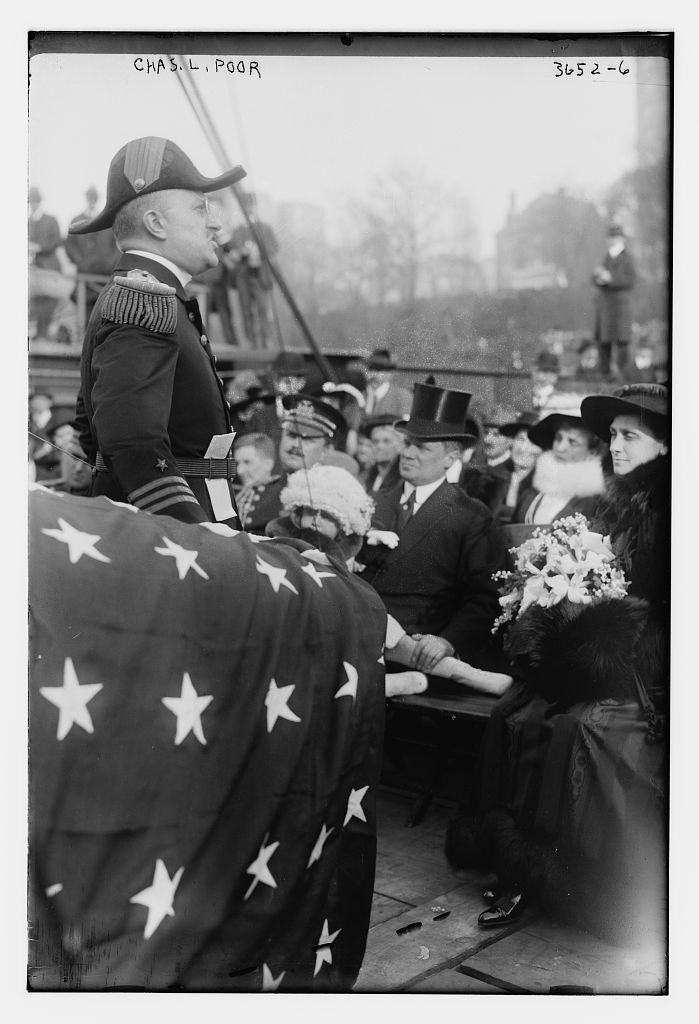
Charles L. Poor, Commander 1st BN, NYNM with Governor of the State of New York, Charles Seymour Whitman in November 1915.

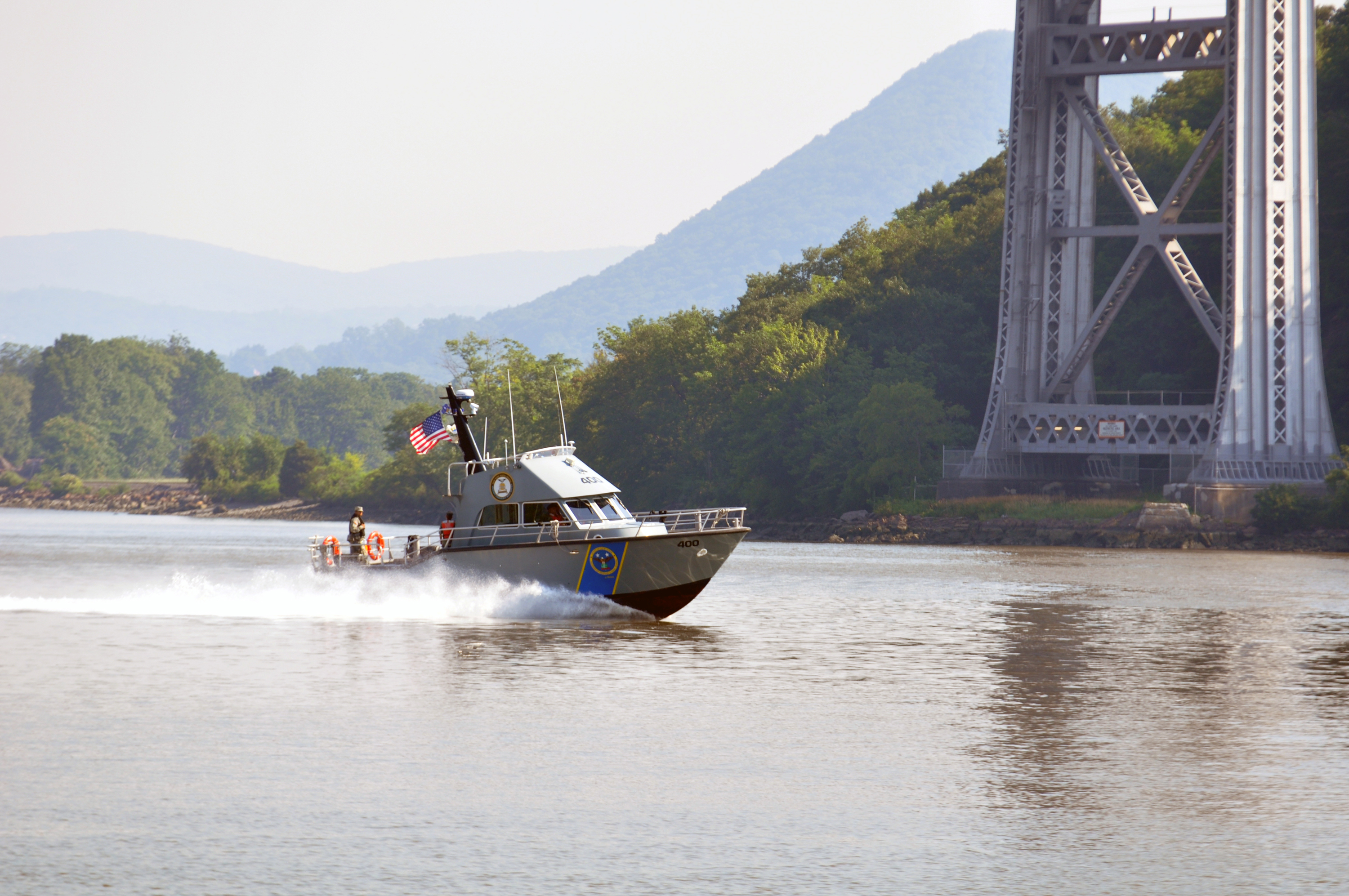
The New York State Naval Militia's Patrol Boat 400 conducts a random anti-terrorism measures program patrol on the Hudson River.

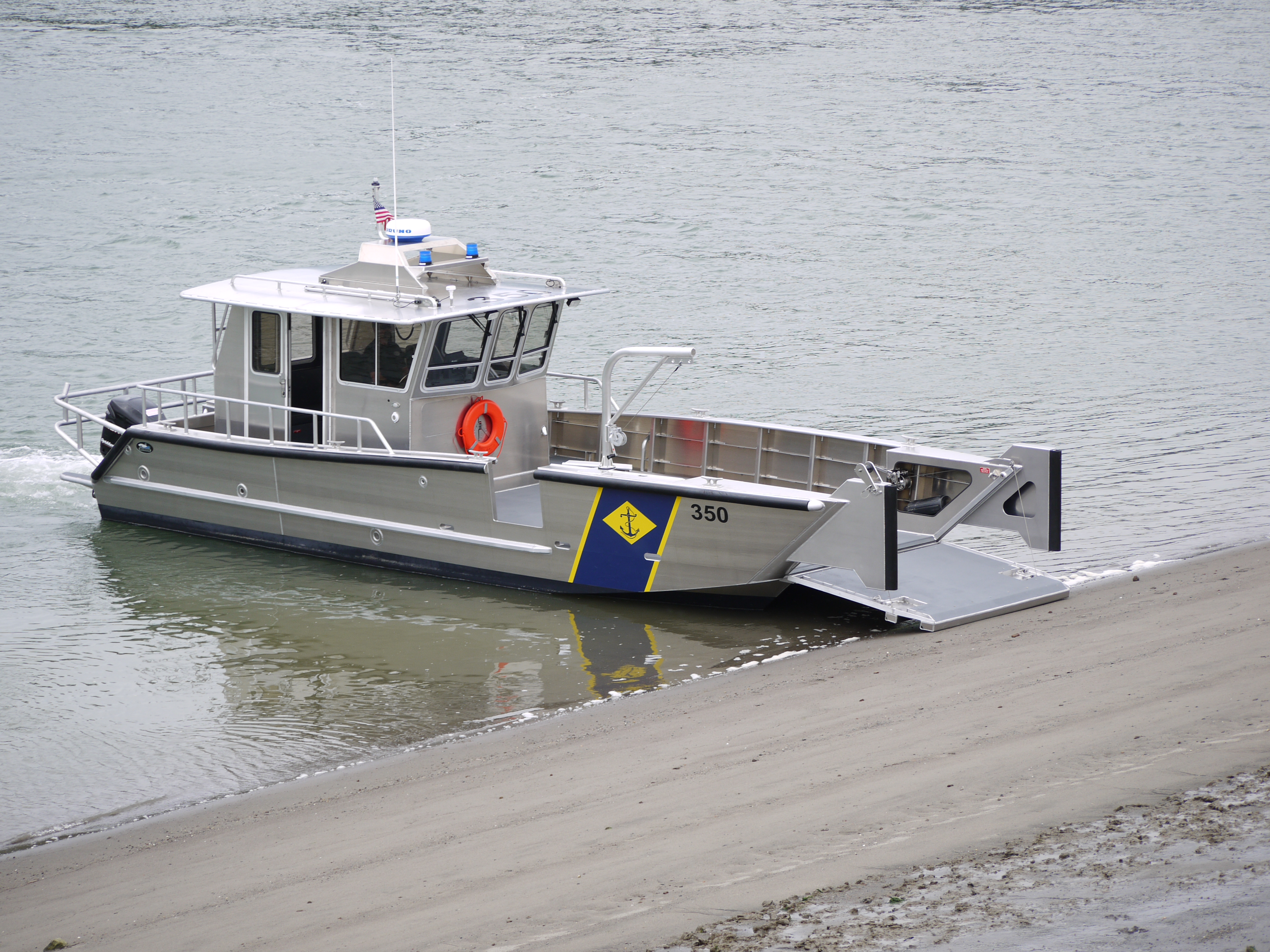
LC-350, the New York Naval Militia's newest vessel, received on July 21, 2018.

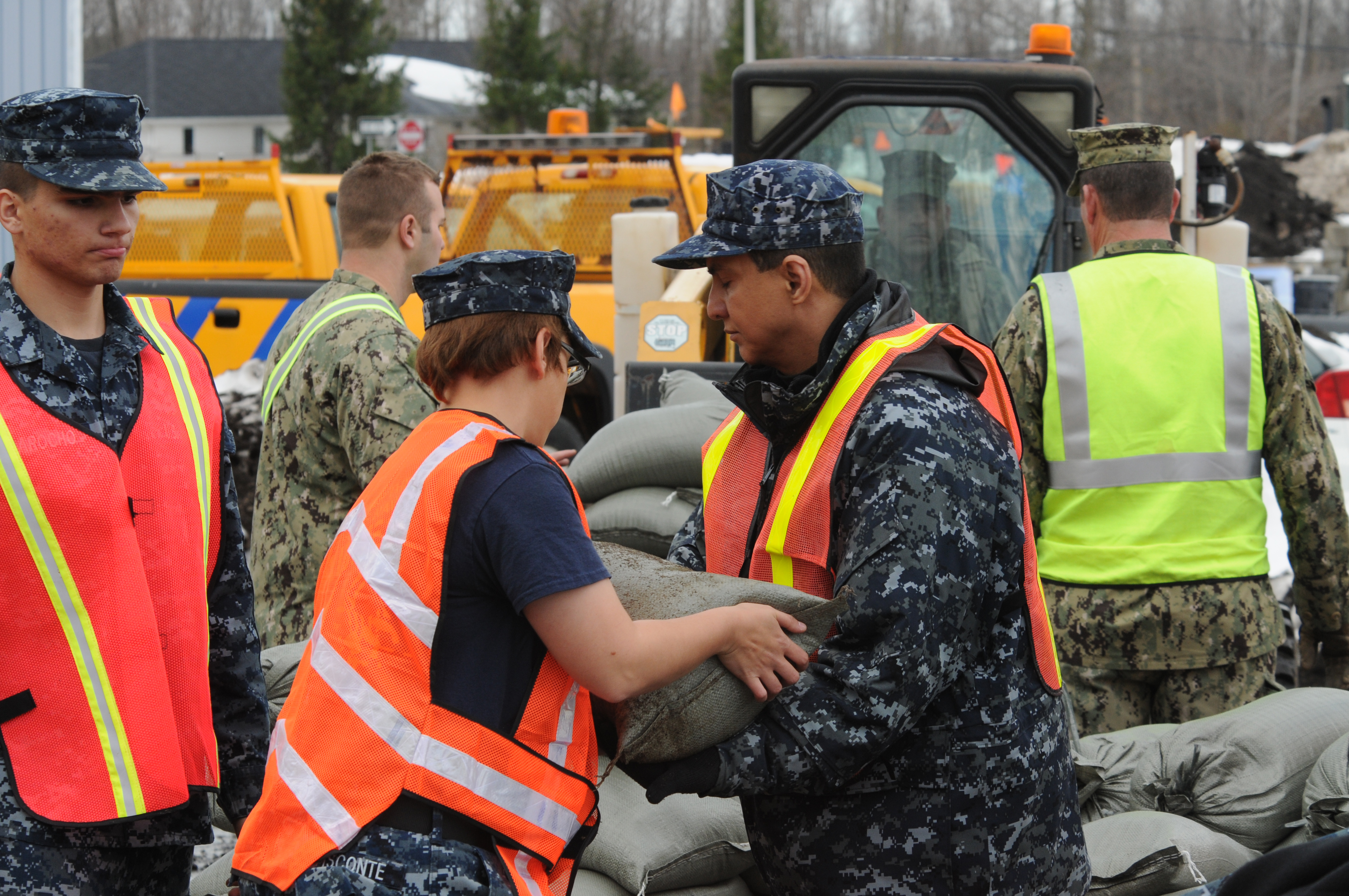
Members of the New York Naval Militia fill sandbags to aid in the preparations for possible flooding in the areas affected by a lake effect storm in the Buffalo, N.Y., region.

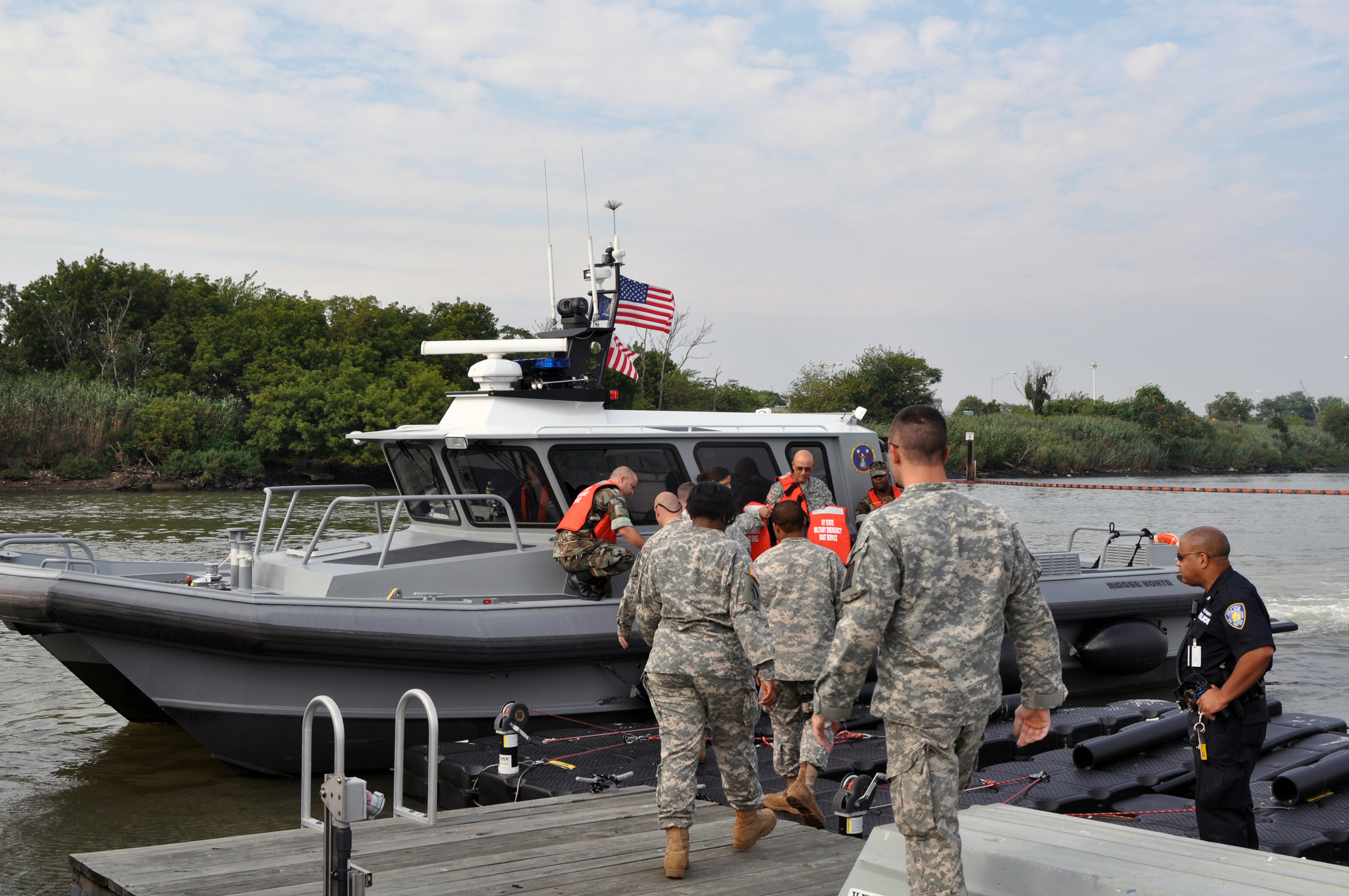
Members of the New York Army National Guard join members of the New York State Naval Militia, the Port Authority Police Department and the Coast Guard Reserve.
