= List of equipment of the United States Armed Forces =

The equipment of the United States Armed Forces includes: weapons, ammunition, vehicles, and attire. Weapons such as, M4A1 rifles, M2 machine guns, and more have been used. Ammunition includes .50 caliber, and more. Vehicles such as Humvees and M1A2 Abrams are in service with the United States Armed Forces as well, and many others. Helicopters like the UH-60 Black Hawk and Apache helicopters and more are used too by them. Planes such as F-35s, F-22s, F-15s, and more have been used. Ships include the USS Enterprise, the USS Gerald R. Ford, destroyers, and many more are used.

== Weapons ==
Weapons
Name	Type	Manufacturer	Caliber	Branches	Notes	Picture
Sidearms
M9	Semi-automatic pistol	Beretta	9×19mm Parabellum	Army, Marine Corps, Navy, Air Force, Coast Guard	Standard service pistol. To be replaced by the M17.	
M11	Semi-automatic pistol	SIG Sauer	9×19mm Parabellum	Army, Marine Corps, Navy, Coast Guard	Compact/carry pistol. Will be replaced by the M18.	
M17, M18 MHS	Semi-automatic pistol	SIG Sauer	9×19mm Parabellum	Army, Marine Corps, Navy, Air Force, Coast Guard	Next generation service pistol. Customized version of the SIG Sauer P320.	
M1911	Semi-automatic pistol	Colt Manufacturing Company	.45 ACP	Army, Marine Corps, Navy, Air Force, Coast Guard, USSOCOM	Limited service, currently in special operations use as the upgraded M45 model.	
Assault rifles, battle rifles, bolt action rifles and carbines
M1903 Springfield	Bolt-action rifle	Springfield Armory	.30-03 Springfield.30-06 Springfield	Army, Marine Corps, Navy, Air Force, Coast Guard	Still in use with Junior ROTC units for ceremonial purposes.	
M1 Garand	Semi-automatic rifle	Springfield Armory	.30-06 Springfield (7.62×63mm) 7.62×51mm NATO (.308 Winchester) (Postwar use by U.S. Navy)	Army, Marine Corps, Navy, Air Force, Coast Guard	Mostly ceremonial.	
M4 carbine/M4A1	Assault rifle, carbine	Colt Manufacturing Company	5.56×45mm NATO	Army, Marine Corps, Navy, Air Force, Coast Guard, USSOCOM	M4A1 currently the standard service rifle of the United States Army.	
M16A2	Assault rifle	Colt Manufacturing Company	5.56×45mm NATO	Army, Marine Corps, Navy, Air Force, Coast Guard	Virtually phased out, still in limited service.	
M16A3, M16A4	Assault rifle	Colt Manufacturing Company	5.56×45mm NATO	Army, Marine Corps	M16A4 still in use with some Marine Corps units.	
HK416	Assault rifle	Heckler & Koch	5.56×45mm NATO	USSOCOM	Piston operated rifle, ergonomics and controls based on the M16/M4 platform. Used by US Delta force units and MARSOC marine raiders.	
M27 IAR	Assault rifle, squad automatic weapon	Heckler & Koch	5.56×45mm NATO	Marine Corps	Derived from the HK 416, currently supplementing the M249 as the Marine Corps’ squad automatic weapon (SAW). In 2018, the Marine Corps announced plans to make the M27 the standard-issue rifle for all infantry riflemen.	
Mk 16 Mod 0, Mk 17 Mod 0 SCAR	Assault rifle (SCAR L) battle rifle (SCAR H)	FN Herstal	5.56×45mm NATO 7.62×51mm NATO	USSOCOM, USMC Maritime Raid Force		
M14	Battle rifle	Springfield ArmoryWinchesterHarrington & RichardsonThompson-Ramo-Wooldridge, Inc.	7.62×51mm NATO	Army, Marine Corps, Navy, Air Force, Coast Guard	Limited service, mostly ceremonial.	
HK417	Battle rifle	Heckler & Koch	7.62x51mm NATO	Navy	Adopted as a battle rifle by Naval Special Warfare and JSOC units.	
MCX	Assault rifle	SIG Sauer	5.56×45mm NATO, .300 AAC Blackout	USSOCOM		
M7	Assault rifle	SIG Sauer	.277 FURY	NGSW program	Selected by the United States Army to replace the M16/M4 platform.	
Sniper rifles, marksman rifles and anti-materiel sniper rifles
Mk 14 EBR	Designated marksman rifle/Sniper rifle	Smith Enterprise, Inc.	7.62×51mm NATO	Army, Coast Guard, USSOCOM		
M39 EMR	Designated marksman rifle	Sage International	7.62×51mm NATO,	Marine Corps, USSOCOM		
SDM-R	Designated marksman rifle		5.56×45mm NATO	Army		
M110 SASS	Designated marksman rifle, sniper rifle	Knight's Armament Company	7.62×51mm NATO	Army, Marine Corps, USSOCOM	To replace the M39 & Mk 11 (USMC) and M14 EBR (Army)	
M110A1 CSASS	Designated marksman rifle, sniper rifle	Heckler & Koch	7.62×51mm NATO	Army, Marine Corps, USSOCOM	M110 Sniper Made from Heckler Koch	
M24 SWS	Sniper rifle	Remington Arms Company	7.62×51mm NATO	Army, Air Force, USSOCOM		
M2010 ESR	Sniper rifle	Remington Arms Company	.300 Winchester Magnum	Army		
M40	Sniper rifle	Remington Arms Company	7.62×51mm NATO	Marine Corps, USSOCOM	Upgraded M40A1, M40A3, and M40A5 models were used by Marine Corps scout snipers.	
M1903 Springfield	Bolt-action rifle	Springfield Armory	.30-03 Springfield.30-06 Springfield	Army, Marine Corps, Navy, Air Force, Coast Guard	Mostly ceremonial.	
Mk 13	Sniper rifle	Accuracy International/Remington Arms Company	.300 Winchester Magnum	USSOCOM (Mod 5), Marine Corps (Mod 7)	Replaced the M40A5 in USMC service.	
Mk 21 PSR	Sniper rifle	Remington Arms Company	7.62×51mm NATO, .300 Winchester Magnum, .338 Lapua Magnum, .338 Norma Magnum	Army		
MK20 SSR	Tactical precision rifle, designated marksman rifle	FN Herstal	7.62x51mm NATO, 6.5 Creedmoor	Army		
Mk 22 ASR	Sniper rifle	Barrett Firearms Company	.300 Winchester Magnum, .300 Norma Magnum, .308 Winchester, .338 Norma Magnum, .338 Lapua Magnum	Army, Marine Corps, USSOCOM	To replace the M2010 ESR and MK13.	
Barrett 50 Cal/M82, M107	Anti-materiel sniper rifle	Barrett Firearms Company	.50 BMG	Army, Marine Corps, Navy, Air Force, Coast Guard, USSOCOM		
Shotguns
M590	Shotgun	O.F. Mossberg & Sons	12-gauge	Army, Marine Corps, Navy, Air Force	Also 500M MILS.	
Remington Model 870	Shotgun	Remington Arms Company	12-gauge	Army, Marine Corps, Navy, Coast Guard		
M1014	Semi-automatic shotgun	Benelli Armi SPA	12-gauge	Army, Marine Corps		
M26 MASS	Shotgun	C-More Systems	12-gauge	Army		
Submachine guns
MP5	Submachine gun	Heckler & Koch	9×19mm Parabellum	Army, Marine Corps, Navy, Air Force, USSOCOM		
MP7	Submachine gun, Personal defense weapon	Heckler & Koch	4.6×30mm HK	Army, Navy, Coast Guard, USSOCOM		
APC9 Pro-K SCW	Submachine gun	Brügger & Thomet	9×19mm Parabellum	Army, Air Force		
Machine guns
M249 SAW	Light machine gun, squad automatic weapon	FN Herstal	5.56×45mm NATO	Army, Marine Corps, Navy, Air Force		
M240	General purpose medium machine gun	FN Herstal	7.62×51mm NATO	Army, Marine Corps, Air Force, Coast Guard		
M60	General purpose medium machine gun	Saco Defense; U.S. Ordnance	7.62×51mm NATO	Army, Marine Corps, Navy, Air Force, Coast Guard, USSOCOM		
M250	Light machine gun	SIG Sauer	.277 Fury	NGSW program	Winner of the NGSW program in April 2022, selected by the United States Army to replace the M249 SAW.	
Small arms ammunition: 4.6×30mm; 5.56×45mm NATO; M855 Ball; M855A1 Ball; M856 Tracer; M856A1 Tracer; M995 Armor Piercing; Mk 262 Mod 1; Mk318 Mod 0; 7.62×51mm NATO; M62 Tracer; M80 Ball; M118LR; M276 Dim Tracer; M993 Armor Piercing; Mk 316 Mod 0; Mk319 Mod 0; .300 Winchester Magnum; Mk 248 Mod 0/1; .338 Lapua Magnum; 9×19mm Parabellum; M882 Ball; .40 S&W; .45 ACP; .50 BMG; M8 Armor Piercing Incendiary (API); M17 Tracer; M20 Armor Piercing Incendiary-Tracer (API-T); M33 Ball; M903 SLAP; M962 SLAP-T; M1022 Long-Range Sniper; Mk 211 Mod 0; Mk257 API Dim Tracer; Mk 300 Mod 0 API-T; 12 Gauge
Artillery, Tank and Mortar Ammunition: 155MM; M107 HE; M795 HE; M483A1 DPICM; M864 DPICM; M718/M741 RAMMS; M692/M731 ADAM; M549 HERA; M982 Excalibur; 105MM; L31 HE; XL32E1 HE; M916 HE; L52 Smoke; M927 HERA; M913 HERA; 105×617mmR; M490 TP-T; M724A2; 120×570mm NATO; M1028; IM-HE-T; KE-WA1; KE-WA2; KE-WA4; M865 TPCSDS-T; M1002 TPMP-T
Heavy weapons and mounted weapons
M61 Vulcan	Gatling gun – six-barrels	General Dynamics	20×102mm	Army, Air Force, Marine Corps, Navy, Coast Guard		
M134	Gatling gun – six-barrels	General Electric; Dillon Aero; Garwood Industries; Profense	7.62×51mm NATO	Army, Air Force, Marine Corps, Navy		
M2 HMG	Heavy machine gun	General Dynamics; Ohio Ordnance Works Inc.; U.S. Ordnance	.50 BMG	Army, Air Force, Marine Corps, Navy, Coast Guard		
GAU-19	Gatling gun	General Dynamics	.50 BMG			
Mk 19 Grenade Machine Gun	Automatic grenade launcher	General Dynamics	40 mm grenades	Army, Air Force, Marine Corps, Navy, Coast Guard		
Mk 47 Striker	Automatic grenade launcher	General Dynamics	40 mm grenades	USSOCOM		
Explosive launchers (Grenade Launchers, Rocket Launchers, Anti Tank & Anti Air Launchers)
FGM-148 Javelin	Anti-tank guided missile system	Raytheon & Lockheed Martin	127mm	Army, Marine Corps		
M136 (AT4)	Anti-tank rocket system	Alliant Techsystems	84mm	Army, Air Force, Marine Corps, Navy	Adopted by the United States Army as the "Lightweight Multipurpose Weapon M136".	
M3 MAAWS	Anti-tank recoilless rifle	Saab Bofors Dynamics	84x246mm R	Army, USSOCOM		
SMAW	Anti-tank rocket system	Nammo Talley	83.5mm	Army, Marine Corps		
M203	Grenade launcher	Airtronic USA	40 mm grenade	Army, Marine Corps, Navy, Air Force, Coast Guard, USSOCOM	Used by M16 & M4/M4A1 as a underbarrel weapon, can be standalone	
M320	Grenade launcher	Heckler & Koch	40 mm grenade	Army, Marine Corps, Air Force	Used by M4/M4A1 & HK416 as a underbarrel weapon, can be standalone, to replace the M203	
M32 MGL	Revolver grenade launcher	Milkor USA, Inc.	40 mm grenade	Marine Corps, USSOCOM		
MK 13 EGLM	Grenade launcher	FN Herstal	40 mm grenade	Army	Used by SCAR L & SCAR H only as a underbarrel weapon, can be standalone	
FIM-92 Stinger	Man-portable air-defense system	Raytheon Missiles & Defense		Army, Marine Corps		
2,066 active (May 5, 2025) – mortars
M120	Mortar	Soltam Systems	120 mm mortar	Army, Marine Corps	Active - 1,076 M120	
M252	Mortar		81 mm mortar	Army, Marine Corps	Active - 990 M252	
M224	Mortar		60 mm mortar	Army, Marine Corps		
8,400 active (May 7, 2025) – cruise missiles
AGM-158 JASSM	Cruise missile	Lockheed Martin		Air Force, Navy, Marine Corps	Roughly 3,600 AGM-158 JASSM	
AGM-158C LRASM	Cruise missile	Lockheed Martin	Anti-shipping version of AGM-158 JASSM	Air Force, Navy, Marine Corps	Roughly 450 AGM-158C LRASM	
BGM-109	Cruise missile	Raytheon Missiles & Defense		Navy, Army, Marine Corps	Roughly 4,000 BGM-109	
AGM-86 ALCM	Cruise missile	Boeing	Nuclear delivery platform	Air Force	Roughly 350 AGM-86 ALCM	AGM-86 ALCM

== Vehicles ==
=== Fixed-wing aircraft ===
Name	Description	Manufacturer	Version	Branches	Quantity	Notes	Picture
195 active (OCT 4th, 2025) – Close air support (CAS)
A-10C	Close air support, forward air control	Fairchild Republic	A-10C	Air Force	162	Retirement delayed to 2030	
OA-1K	Close air support, forward air control	L3Harris	OA-1K	Air Force	2	60 More planned	
AC-130	Close air support, air interdiction and force protection	Lockheed Martin	AC-130J	Air Force	31		
143 active, 24 stored, 97 planned (May 5, 2025) – Strategic bomber
B-1B	Long-range multirole heavy bomber	Rockwell International (now part of Boeing)	B-1B	Air Force	45	14 Stored	
B-52H	High altitude long-range strategic heavy bomber	Boeing	B-52H	Air Force	76	To be upgraded to B-52J 10 Stored Will serve until 2050s	
B-2	Low observable strategic stealth heavy bomber	Northrop Grumman	B-2A	Air Force	20		
B-21	Low observable strategic stealth heavy bomber	Northrop Grumman	B-21 Raider	Air Force	3	97 More planned	
1,274 active (May 8, 2025) – Military transport aircraft
C-5M	Intercontinental outsize heavy cargo transport	Lockheed Martin	C-5M	Air Force	52		
C-17	Intercontinental strategic transport	Boeing	C-17A	Air Force	222		
C-130	Tactical transport aircraft	Lockheed Martin	C-130H C-130E	Air Force, Coast Guard, Navy	126	To be replaced on one for one basis with C-130J	
C-130J	Tactical transport aircraft	Lockheed Martin	C-130J C-130J-30	Air Force, Navy	274		
MC-130J	Tactical transport aircraft	Lockheed Martin	MC-130J	Air Force	57	7 More planned	
HC-130	Combat Search and Rescue aircraft	Lockheed Martin	HC-130H HC-130J HC-130P HC-130P/N	Air Force, Coast Guard	59		
LC-130H	Tactical transport aircraft	Lockheed Martin	LC-130H	Air Force	10	Equipped with skees	
C-27J	Medium-lift tactical transport aircraft	Leonardo	C-27J HC-27J	Army, Coast Guard	21		
VC-25	Executive Transport Aircraft	Boeing	VC-25A VC-25B	Air Force	2	Used as Air Force One. VC-25A based on Boeing 747-200B to be replaced by VC-25B. Two VC-25B to be built, based on Boeing 747-8I.	
C-32	Passenger aircraft	Boeing	C-32	Air Force	6		
C-40	Passenger aircraft	Boeing	C-40B C-40C	Navy, Air Force, Marine Corps	30		
C-146A	Passenger/Cargo aircraft	Dornier Luftfahrt GmbH	C-146A	Air Force	20	Used for Special Operations	
CN-235	Passenger/Cargo aircraft	CASA	CN-235 HC-144A HC-144B	Air Force, Coast Guard	23	Air Force version Used for Special Operations	
C-2A	Passenger/Cargo aircraft	Northrop Grumman	C-2A C-2R	Navy	26	Carrier based transport plane	
C-26D	Passenger aircraft	Fairchild Republic	C-26D	Air Force, Navy	18		
C-21A	Passenger aircraft		C-21A	Air Force	19		
C-12	Passenger/Cargo aircraft Surveillance aircraft	Beechcraft	C-12C C-12D C-12F C-12J MC-12W	Army, Air Force, Marine Corps, Navy	151		
C-20	Passenger aircraft	Gulfstream Aerospace	C-20A C-20B C-20C C-20D C-20H C-20G C-20J	Army, Air Force, Navy	19		
C-37	Passenger aircraft	Gulfstream Aerospace	C-37A C-37B	Army, Air Force, Navy, Coast Guard	14		
C-145	Light utility transport	PZL Mielec	C-145	AFSOC	10		
134 active, 49 stored, 51 planned (May 25, 2025) Airborne Early Warning And Control (AEW&C)
E-2	All-weather carrier based airborne early warning and control	Northrop Grumman	E-2C E-2D	Navy	83	25 E-2D more planned 20 stored	
E-3	Airborne warning and control system (AWACS)	Boeing	E-3B E-3G	Air Force	15	Planned to be fully retired by 2035 29 stored	
E-7A	Airborne warning and control system (AWACS)	Boeing	E-7A	Air Force	0	26 more planned	
E-4	National emergency airborne command post	Boeing	E-4B	Air Force	4		
E-6	Naval Communications Relay/Airborne Command Post	Boeing	E-6B	Navy	16	Planned to be fully retired by the 2030s	
E-8	Airborne Battle Management Platform	Northrop Grumman	E-8B E-8C	Air Force	16		
149 active (May 7, 2025) – reconnaissance planes
U-2S	Reconnaissance	Lockheed	U-2S	Air Force	27	Planned to be retired by 2026	
RC-135	Reconnaissance	Boeing	RC-135S RC-135U RC-135V RC-135W	Air Force	25		
CL-650	Reconnaissance	Bombardier Aerospace	CL-650	Army	2		
MC/RC-12	Reconnaissance	Beechcraft	MC-12 RC-12	Army	95		
545 active, 90 planned (May 6, 2025) – tanker planes
KC-135	Aerial tanker	Boeing	KC-135R KC-135T	Air Force	376		
KC-46	Aerial tanker	Boeing	KC-46A	Air Force	89	90 more planned	
KC-130J	Aerial tanker	Lockheed Martin	KC-130J	Marine Corps	80		
158 active (May 5, 2025) – maritime patrol aircraft (ASW)
P-3	Anti-Submarine Marine Patrol Aircraft	Lockheed Martin	P-3C	Navy	28	Phasing out of service	
P-8	Anti-Submarine, Anti-Surface, Shipping Interdiction Patrol Aircraft	Boeing	P-8A	Navy	130		
177 active (Oct 13th, 2025) – electronic-warfare aircraft
EA-18G	Carrier-based Electronic-Warfare Aircraft	Major components: Boeing & Northrop Grumman	EA-18G	Navy	153		
EC-130H	Electronic-Warfare Aircraft	Lockheed Martin	EC-130H EC-130J	Air Force	5 EC-130H 5 EC-130J		
EP-3E	Electronic-Warfare Aircraft	Lockheed Martin	EP-3E	Navy	9	Planned to be fully retired by 2025	
EO-5	Electronic-Warfare Aircraft		EO-5C RC-7	Army	9		
EA-37B	Electronic-Warfare Aircraft	L3Harris BAE Systems	EA-37B	Air Force	5	5 More planned	
299 active (May 6, 2025) – air superiority fighter
F-22	Air Superiority Aircraft	Major components: Boeing &Lockheed Martin	F-22A	Air Force	150		
F-15	Air Superiority Aircraft	Boeing	F-15C F-15D	Air Force	149	No F-15C in active service, only Reserve and National Guard	
2,139 active, 2,027 planned (May 7, 2025) – multirole combat aircraft
F-15E	Multi-role combat aircraft	Boeing	F-15E	Air Force	218		
F-15EX	Multi-role combat aircraft	Boeing	F-15EX	Air Force	9	96 more planned	
F-16	Multi-role combat aircraft	Lockheed Martin	F-16C	Air Force	726		
F/A-18	Carrier based Multi-role Combat Aircraft	Major components: Boeing & Northrop Grumman	F/A-18C	Marine Corps	138		
F/A-18	Carrier based Multi-role Combat Aircraft	Major components: Boeing & Northrop	F/A-18E F/A-18F	Navy	549	76 more planned	Top view of gray jet fighter banks toward camera
F-35	Advanced Multi-role combat aircraft	Major components: Lockheed Martin & Northrop Grumman	F-35A F-35C	Air Force, Navy	408 F-35A 100 F-35C	Multi role strike fighter. F-35C Navy variant carrier based. 1,855 more planned of all variants	

=== Rotary-winged aircraft / VTOL / VSTOL ===
Name	Type	Manufacturer	Version	Branches	Quantity	Notes	Picture
	274 active (May 5, 2025) – VSTOL / VTOL						
F-35B	Advanced multi-role combat aircraft	Major components: Lockheed Martin& Northrop Grumman	F-35B	Marine Corps	235	Supersonic STOVL multirole fighter 1,855 more planned of all variants	
AV-8B	Close air support	Major components: Boeing & BAE Systems	AV-8B	Marine Corps	39	To be replaced by F-35B. The original variant of this aircraft is of British design. Retiring 2025	
	1,003 active, 15 planned (May 6, 2025) – attack helicopters						
AH-1Z	Attack helicopter	Bell Textron	AH-1Z	Marine Corps	179	about 30 put into storage in 2021	
AH-64	Attack helicopter	Boeing	AH-64D AH-64E	Army	824	15 more planned	
935 active, 762 planned (May 10, 2025) – heavy lift helicopters
V-22 Osprey	Cargo helicopter	Major components: Bell Textron & Boeing	MV-22B CV-22B CMV -22B	Marines Corps, Air Force, Navy	288 MV-22B 19 CMV-22B 52 CV-22B		
CH-47	Cargo helicopter	Boeing	CH-47D CH-47F	Army	394 CH-47D 48 CH-47F	464 more planned	
MH-47	Multi-mission helicopter	Boeing	MH-47G	Army	36	69 more planned	
CH-53E	Cargo helicopter	Sikorsky	CH-53E	Marines Corps, Navy	123		
CH-53K	Cargo helicopter	Sikorsky	CH-53K	Marine Corps	11		
3,560 active, 2,329 to 4,464 planned (May 10, 2025) – utility helicopters
UH-1Y	Utility helicopter	Bell Textron	UH-1Y	Marine Corps	122		
UH-1N	Utility aircraft	Bell Textron	UH-1N	Air Force	63	Planned to be retired by 2026	
HH-60 Jay Hawk	Recovery helicopter	Sikorsky	HH-60T	Coast Guard	45	82 more planned	
HH-60 Pave Hawk	Search and rescue helicopter	Sikorsky	HH-60G HH-60W	Air Force	64 HH-60G 32 HH-60W	53 more planned	
MH-60 Black Hawk	Multi-mission helicopter	Sikorsky	MH-60K MH-60L	Army	23 MH-60K 35 MH-60L		
UH-60 Black Hawk	Utility aircraft	Sikorsky	UH-60L UH-60M	Army	1,978	120 to 255 more planned	
VH-60N Whitehawk	Marine One VIP Transport	Sikorsky	VH-60N	Marine Corps	8		
VH-3D	Marine One VIP Transport	Sikorsky	VH-3D	Marine Corps	11		
VH-92	Marine One VIP Transport	Sikorsky	VH-92	Marine Corps	23		
SH-60 Seahawk	Search and rescue helicopter Multi-mission helicopter Multi-mission helicopter Anti-submarine helicopter helicopter Anti-submarine helicopter helicopter	Sikorsky	HH-60H MH-60R MH-60S SH-60B SH-60F	Navy	526		
V-280	Utility aircraft	Bell Textron	V-280	Army	0	2,000 to 4,000 more planned	
MH-139	Utility aircraft	Boeing	MH-139A	Air Force	7	49 more planned	
HH-65	Search and rescue helicopter	Airbus Helicopters	MH-65D MH-65E	Coast Guard	98	This aircraft is of French design.	
UH-72	Utility aircraft	Airbus Helicopters	UH-72A	Army	478	30 more planned currently used for training	
MH-6	Special operations utility helicopter / Attack helicopter	Hughes Tool Company's Aircraft Division	AH-6C MH-6E AH-6F AH-6G MH-6H AH/MH-6J	Army	47	74 more planned	
300 active, 71 planned (May 7, 2025) – training helicopters
Mi-24	Aggressor	Mil Moscow Helicopter Plant	Mi-24	Army	2		
Mil Mi-8/Mi-17	Aggressor	Mil Moscow Helicopter Plant	Mi-8 Mi-17	Army	10		
T-57	Training helicopter	Bell Textron	TH-57B TH-57C	Navy	44 TH-57B 85 TH-57C		
TH-73A	Training helicopter	Leonardo	TH-73A	Navy	59	71 more planned	
TH-67	Training helicopter	Bell Textron	TH-67	Army	172	The aircraft is a joint US-Canadian design.	
TH-1H	Training helicopter	Bell Textron	TH-1H	Air Force	28		Bell UH-1H Iroquois
1,924 active, 351 planned (May 8, 2025) – training planes
F-117	Aggressor	Lockheed Martin	F-117A	Air Force	45	Planned to be fully retired by 2036	Top view of angular aircraft banking left while flying over mountain range
F-16	Aggressor, training plane	Lockheed Martin	F-16A F-16D	Air Force, Navy	22 F-16A Navy 158 F-16D Air Force		
F/A-18	Aggressor, training plane	McDonnell Douglas	F/A-18D	Navy	43		
F-5F/N	Aggressor, training plane	Northrop	F-5F F-5N	Marine Corps, Navy	43		
T-38	Training plane	Northrop	T-38A T-38C AT-38B	Air Force	495		
T-45C	Carrier Training plane	McDonnell Douglas	T-45C	Navy	189		
T-7	Training plane	Boeing	T-7A	Air Force	2	351 more planned	
T-1A	Training plane		T-1A	Air Force	127		
TU-2S	Training plane	Lockheed Martin	TU-2S	Air Force	4	Planned to be retired by 2026	
TC-135	Training plane	Boeing	TC-135S TC-135W	Air Force	3	Training version of RC-135	
T-44C	Training plane	Beechcraft	T-44C	Navy	57		
T-6	Training plane	Textron Aviation	T-6	Air Force, Navy	736	29 more planned	

=== Spacecraft ===
Name	Type	Branches	Quantity	Notes	Picture
Spacecraft
Global Positioning System	Navigation and timing satellites	Space Force	30		
X-37B	Reusable robotic spacecraft	Space Force	2		

=== Land vehicles ===
Name	Manufacturer	Variants	Branches	Quantity	Notes	Picture
2,650 active, 2,000 stored (May 5, 2025) – main battle tanks (MBT)
M1 Abrams	Lima Army Tank Plant BAE Systems Platforms & Services	M1A1 SA M1A2 SEP v2 M1A2 SEP v3	Army	Active - M1A1 SA M1A2 SEP v2 M1A2 SEP v3 Stored - M1 Abrams of different versions.	Roughly 4,600 M1 Abrams in US ownership	
~26 delivered (May 5, 2025) – light tanks
M10 Booker	General Dynamics	M10	Army	Active - ~26 delivered M10 Planned - 396 M10 (Canceled)	396 more planned (Canceled)	
2,964 active, 2,000 stored, 361 planned (May 29, 2025) – infantry fighting vehicles (IFV)
M2 Bradley Fighting Vehicle	BAE Systems Platforms & Services	M2A2 ODS M2A3 M2A4	Army	Active - 2,100 M2A2/M2A3 210 M2A4 Stored - 2,000 M2A2/M2A3	Roughly 4,100 M2 Bradley in US ownership	
M1296 Dragoon	General Dynamics Land Systems	M1296 Dragoon	Army	Active - 83 M1296 Dragoon	83 in US ownership	M1296 ICV-D equipped with DVE-Wide thermal cameras on the front and sides
M1304 ICVVA1-30MM	General Dynamics Land Systems	M1304 ICVVA1-30MM	Army	Active - 83 M1304 ICVVA1-30MM Planned - 186 M1304 ICVVA1-30MM	Roughly 83 M1304 ICVVA1-30MM in US ownership M1304 ICVVA1-30MM are upgrades of existing vehicles	M1304 ICVVA1-30mm
LAV-25	General Motors Diesel	LAV-25A1 LAV-25A2 LAV-25A3	Marine Corps	Active - 488 LAV-25A1/A2/A3	488 LAV-25A1/A2/A3 in US ownership	
ACV-30	BAE Systems	ACV-30	Marine Corps	Planned - 175 ACV-30	175 ACV-30 planned for US Ownership	
239 active (May 5, 2025) – anti-tank launcher vehicles
M1134 Stryker M1253A1 Stryker	General Dynamics Land Systems	M1134 M1253A1	Army	Active - 102 M1134 31 M1253A1	133 M1134/M1253A1 in US ownership	
LAV-AT	General Motors Diesel	LAV-AT	Marine Corps	Active - 106 LAV-AT	106 LAV-AT in US ownership	
7,439 active, 9,200 stored, 2,418 planned (May 10, 2025) – armored personnel carrier (APC)
M113	BAE Systems Platforms & Services	M113A2 M113A3	Army	Active - 4,700 M113A2/M113A3 Stored - 8,000 M113A2/M113A3	Roughly 12,700 M113 in US ownership	
M1126 Stryker	General Dynamics Land Systems	M1126 ICV M1256A1 ICV	Army	Active - 1,162 M1126 ICV 521 M1256A1 ICV	Roughly 1,683 APC variant of Stryker in US ownership	
ACV-P	BAE Systems	ACV-P	Marine Corps	Active - 352 ACV-P Planned - 38 ACV-P	352 ACV-P in US ownership 38 More ACV-P planned	
LAV-LOG	General Motors Diesel	LAV-LOG	Marine Corps	Active - 127 LAV-LOG	127 in US ownership Logistics Version of LAV-25	LAV-MEWSS
Armored Ground Mobility System	Steyr-Daimler-Puch Spezialfahrzeuge	Pandur 1 (6x6) AGMS	USASOC	Active - 50 AGMS	50 AGMS in US ownership	
AMPV	BAE Systems	M1283 GP M1284 MEV M1285 MTV M1286MCmd M1287 MCV	Army	Active - 527 AMPV (assorted variants) Planned – 2,380 AMPV (assorted variants)	527 assorted AMPV in US ownership 2,380 More AMPV planned (future uncertain)	
Assault Amphibious Vehicle	BAE Systems Platforms & Services	AAVP-7A1	Marine Corps	Stored - 1,200 AAVP-7A1	Roughly 1,200 in US ownership	
18,512 active (May 28, 2025) – MRAP
RG-31 Nyala	Land Systems OMC	RG-31 Charger	Army	Active - 1,963	Originated from South Africa Roughly 1,963 in US ownership	
RG-33	Land Systems OMC	RG-33	Army	Active - 2,386	Originated from South Africa Roughly 2,386 in US ownership	
Cougar	Force Protection, Inc.	Cougar 4x4 Cougar 6x6	Army, Marine Corps, Air Force	Active - 1,725 Cougar	Roughly 1,725 in US ownership	
International MaxxPro	International Truck	MaxxPro Dash	Marine Corps, Army	Active - 2,633 MaxxPro Dash	Roughly 2,633 in US ownership	
BAE Caiman	BAE Systems Platforms & Services	Caiman	Marine Corps, Army	Active - 2,800 Caiman	2,800 Estimated in US ownership	
Oshkosh M-ATV	Oshkosh Corporation	M-ATV	Army, Marine Corps, USSOCOM	Active - 6,355 M-ATV	Roughly 6,355 in US ownership	
Buffalo	Force Protection, Inc.	Buffalo	Army, Marine Corps, Air Force, Navy	Active - 650 Buffalo	Roughly 650 in US ownership	
91,640 active (May 30, 2025) – infantry mobility vehicles (IMV)
Humvee	AM General	M1113 M1114 M1151 M1165 (large number of variants)	Army, Marine Corps, Air Force, Navy, Coast Guard	Active - 70,000 Armored Humvees (assorted variants)	Roughly 70,000 Armored Humvees in US ownership Being divested over time	
JLTV	Oshkosh Corporation	M1278 M1279 M1280 M1281	Army, Marines, Navy, Airforce	Active - 20,000 JLTV (assorted variants) Planned - 44,000 JLTV	Roughly 20,000 JLTV in US ownership 44,000 More JLTV planned (future uncertain)	Oshkosh L-ATV in M1278 Heavy Guns Carrier JLTV configuration with Objective Gunner Protection Kit (OGPK)
M1117	Textron Marine & Land Systems	M1117	Army (Military Police)	Active - 1,175	Roughly 1,175 M1117 in US ownership Being divested over time	
M1200	Textron Marine & Land Systems	M1200	Army	Active - 465 M1200	Roughly 465 M1200 in US ownership Being divested over time	
75,900 active, 3,465 planned (May 5, 2025) – light utility vehicle
Humvee	AM General	M998A1/A2 M1025A1/A2 (large number of variants)	Army, Marine Corps, Air Force, Navy, Coast Guard	Active - 75,000 Unarmored Humvees	Roughly 75,000 Unarmored Humvees in US ownership Being divested over time	
M1301 ISV	Oshkosh Defense	M1301 ISV	Army	Active - 300 M1301 ISV Planned - 1,765 M1302 ISV	Roughly 300 M1301 ISV in US ownership 1,765 More M1301 ISV planned	
M1297 GMV	General Dynamics	M1297 GMV	Army	Planned - 1,700 M1297 GMV	1,700 M1297 GMV planned for US Ownership	
M1161	Growler Manufacturing and Engineering	M1161	Marine Corps	Active - 600 M1161	Can be Airlifted by a V-22 Osprey Roughly 600 M1161 in US ownership Being divested over time	
Light Strike Vehicle	Chenowth Racing Products, Inc.		Army	Unknown Quantity		
Advanced Light Strike Vehicle	Chenowth Racing Products, Inc.		Marine Corps, Navy (Navy SEALs/SWCC)	Unknown Quantity		
Ranger Special Operations Vehicle	Land RoverOtokar		Army	60 Originally Ordered Unknown Quantity Today	Exclusive use by the 75th Ranger Regiment	
176,279 active (May 5, 2025) – trucks
M939 Truck	AM General	M939 (large number of variants)		Active - 25,000	Intention is to replace with the Oshkosh FMTV. Figures include National Guard and Air Force. Roughly 25,000 M939 in US ownership	
FMTV	Oshkosh Corporation	FMTV 4x4 MTV 6x6 (large number of variants)	Army, Marine Corps, Air Force, Navy	Active - 108,800 FMTV/MTV	Oshkosh Defense – >23,400 trucks/>11,400 trailers (current manufacturer). 74,000 trucks and trailers by legacy manufacturers. Figures include National Guard and Air Force. Roughly 108,800 FMTV/MTV in US ownership	
MTVR	Oshkosh	MTVR (large number of variants)	Marine Corps	Active - 11,400 MTVR	Roughly 11,400 MTVR in US ownership	
M915	AM General	M915 M915A1 M915A2 M915A3 M915A5	Army	Unknown Quantity		
HEMTT	Oshkosh Corporation	HEMTT (large number of variants)	Army, Air Force	Active - 27,000 (new build and remanufactured)	Figures include National Guard and Air Force. Roughly 27,000 in US ownership	
Oshkosh HET	Oshkosh Corporation	2,488 M1070A0 tractors and >2,600 M1000 trailers delivered of which at least 1,009 tractors and >1000 trailers have been Reset. 1,591 M1070A1 delivered.	Army, Air Force	Active - 4,079 (delivered; not all remain in service)	Figures include National Guard and Air Force. Roughly 4,079 in US ownership	
1,379 active, 1,000 stored (May 5, 2025) – armoured recovery vehicle (ARV)
M88	BAE Systems Land and Armaments	M88A1 M88A2	Army	Active - 914 M88A2 360 M88A1 Stored - 1,000 M88A1	Roughly 2,274 in US ownership	
AAVRA1	BAE Systems Platforms & Services	AAVRA1	Marine Corps	Active - 60 AAVRA1	Roughly 60 AAVRA1 in US ownership	
LAV-R	General Motors Diesel	LAV-R	Marine Corps	Active - 45 LAV-R	Roughly 45 LAV-R in US ownership	LAV-MEWSS
2,556 active (May 5, 2025) – military engineering vehicle
LARC-V	Power Dynamics	LARC-V Amphibious Transport	Navy, Army	Active - 200	200 Estimated, Unknown amount exactly	
M9 Armored Combat Earthmover	International HarvesterCaterpillar	M9 Tracked Armored Bulldozer	Army	Active - 447	Roughly 447 M9 in US ownership	
Caterpillar D9	Caterpillar	D9 Tracked Armored Bulldozer	Army	Unknown Quantity		
JCB HMEE	JCB Fastrac	JCB HMEE Wheeled Armored Bulldozer	Army	Active - 800 JCB HMEE	Roughly 800 JCB HMEE in US ownership	
M104 AVLB	General Dynamics Land Systems	M104 AVLB	Army	Active - 40 M104 AVLB	40 M104 AVLB in US ownership	
M1074 AVLB	General Dynamics Land Systems	M1074 AVLB	Army	Active - 104 M1074 AVLB	Roughly 104 M1074 AVLB in US ownership	
M60 Armored Vehicle Launch Bridge	Anniston Army Depot	M60 AVLB M60A1 AVLB	Army	Unknown Quantity	Last Known Quantity Was 230 M60 AVLB in US ownership	
Husky VMMD	DCD GroupCritical Solutions International	Husky VMMD (Mine Clearing)	Army	Active - 610 Husky VMMD	Detection and mine removal vehicle; originated from South Africa Roughly 610 Husky VMMD in US ownership	
Buffalo AEV	Force Protection, Inc.	Buffalo AEV (Mine Clearing)	Army	Active - 38 Buffalo AEV	Roughly 38 Buffalo AEV in US Ownerhsip	
M1150	General Dynamics Land Systems	M1150 Assault Breacher (Mine Clearing)	Army	Active - 149 M1150	Roughly 149 M1150 in US ownership	
M1132 ESV M1257A1 Stryker	General Dynamics Land Systems	M1132 ESV M1257A1 ESV (Mine Clearing)	Army	Active - 136 M1132 ESV 32 M1257A1 ESV	Roughly 168 M1132/M1257A1 AEV in US ownership	
605 active (May 5, 2025) – armored medical vehicles
M1133 M1254A1 Stryker	General Dynamics Land System	M1133 MEV M1254A1 MEV	Army	Active - 173 M1133 MEV 131 M1254A1 MEV	Roughly 304 M1133/M1254A1 MEV in US ownership	
International MaxxPro	International Truck	Maxxpro Dash DXM Ambulance	Army	Active - 301 Maxxpro Dash LWB Ambulance	Roughly 301 Maxxpro Dash LWB Ambulance in US ownership	
M113A4	BAE Systems Land and Armaments	M113A4 MEV	Army	Unknown Quantity	Phasing out of service. To be replaced with AMPV	
M577	BAE Systems Land and Armaments	M577A2 M577A3 M577A4 M577A4 ATV	Army	Unknown Quantity	Phasing out of service. To be replaced with AMPV	
443 active (May 9, 2025) – armored command vehicles
M1130 CV M1255A1 CV Stryker	General Dynamics Land System	M1130 CV M1255A1 CV	Army	Active - 240 M1130 CV 108 M1255A1 CV	Roughly 348 M1130/M1255A1 CV in US ownership	
LAV-C2	General Motors Diesel	LAV-C2	Marine Corps	Active - 66 LAV-C2	Roughly 66 LAV-C2 in US ownership	LAV-MEWSS
ACV-C	BAE Systems	ACV-C	Marine Corps	Active - 29 ACV-C	Roughly 29 ACV-C in US ownership	
M577	BAE Systems Land and Armaments	M577A3 M577A4 M1068	Army	Unknown Quantity	Phasing out of service. To be replaced with AMPV	
265 active (May 9, 2024) – CBRN defense vehicles
M1135 NBCRV Stryker	General Dynamics Land Systems	M1135 NBCRV	Army	Active - 234 M1135 NBCRV	Roughly 234 M1135 NBCRV in US ownership	
LAV-JSLNBCRS	General Motors Diesel	LAV-JSLNBCRS	Marine Corps	Active - 31 LAV-JSLNBCRS	Roughly 31 LAV-JSLNBCRS in US ownership	LAV-MEWSS
1,933 active, 800 stored (May 29, 2025) – armored reconnaissance vehicle
M3 cavalry fighting vehicle	BAE Systems Land and Armaments	M3A3	Army	Active - 1,200 M3A3 Stored - 800 M3A3	Roughly 2,000 M3A3 in US ownership	
M1127 RV Stryker	General Dynamics Land Systems	M1127 RV	Army	Active - 545 M1127 RV	Roughly 545 M1127 RV in US ownership	
M1131 M1251A1 Stryker	General Dynamics Land Systems	M1131 FSV M1251A1 FSV	Army	Active - 144 M1131 FSV 44 M1251A1 FSV	Roughly 188 M1131/M1251A1 FSV in US Ownerhsip	
1,582 active (May 29, 2025) – self-propelled mortar (SPM)
M1129 M1252A1 Stryker	General Dynamics Land Systems	M1129 MC M1252A1 MC	Army	Active - 322 M1129 119 M1252A1	Roughly 441 M1129/M1252A1 in US ownership 120 mm system	
LAV-M	General Motors Diesel	LAV-M SPM	Marine Corps	Active - 65 LAV-M	Roughly 65 LAV-M in US ownership 120 mm system	LAV-M
M1064	BAE Systems Platforms & Services	M1064 SPM	Army	Active - 1,076 M1064	Roughly 1,076 M1064 in US ownership 120 mm system	
1,412 active (May 5, 2025) – towed artillery
M777A2	BAE Systems	M777A2	Army, Marine Corps	Active - 891 M777A2	Roughly 891 M777A2 in US ownership 155 mm system	
M119	Royal Ordnance Factories	M119	Army	Active - 521 M119	Roughly 521 M119 in US ownership 105 mm system	
745 active, 850 stored, 689 planned (May 10, 2025) – self-propelled artillery (SPG)
M109	BAE Systems Platforms & Services	M109A6 M109A7	Army	Active - 514 M109A6 231 M109A7 Planned - 689 M109A7 Stored - 850 M109A6	Roughly 1,595 M109A6/A7 in US ownership 155 mm system	
231 active (May 5, 2025) – SPG ammunition carrier
M992A3	BAE Systems Platforms & Services	M992A2 M992A3	Army	Active - 231 M992A3	Roughly 231 M992A3 in US ownership Paired with M109s	
795 active, 766 stored, 215 planned (May 5, 2025) – MLRS
M142 high mobility artillery rocket system	Lockheed Martin	M142 HIMARS	Army, Marine Corps	Active - 410 M142 HIMARS Planned - 215 M142 HIMARS	Roughly 410 M142 HIMARS in US ownership 215 More M142 HIMARS planned	
M270 Multiple Launch Rocket System	Lockheed Martin	M270A1 M270A2	Army	Active - 385 M270A1/A2 Stored - 766 M270A1	Production ceased in 2003 Roughly 1,151 M270A1/A2 in US ownership	
577 active, 199 planned (May 29, 2025) – short-range air defense
AN/TWQ-1 Avenger	Boeing	AN/TWQ-1 Avenger Humvee Based	Army, Marine Corps	Active - 453 AN/TWQ-1	Roughly 453 AN/TWQ-1 in US ownership	
Stryker M-SHORAD	General Dynamics Land System	Sgt Stout or Stryker M-SHORAD	Army	Active - 120 Stryker M-SHORAD Planned - 199 Stryker M-SHORAD	Roughly 120 Stryker M-SHORAD in US ownership 199 More Stryker M-SHORAD planned	
Stryker DE M-SHORAD	General Dynamics Land System	Directed Energy Weapon	Army	Active - 4 Stryker DE M-SHORAD	4 Stryker DE M-SHORAD in US ownership Currently in testing	Incorrect Picture
50 batteries active, 10 batteries planned (May 5, 2025) – long-range air defense
MIM-104 Patriot	Lockheed Martin	MIM-104D/E (PAC-2) MIM-104F (PAC 3) MIM-104F (PAC 3 MSE)	Army	Active - 50 batteries MIM-104 Planned - 10 batteries MIM-104	50 batteries in US ownership 10 More batteries MIM-104 planned	
7 batteries active, 1 battery planned (May 5, 2025) – ballistic missile air defense
Terminal High Altitude Area Defense	Lockheed Martin	THAAD	Army	Active - 7 batteries THAAD Planned - 1 battery THAAD	Its purpose is for anti-ballistic missile uses 7 batteries in US ownership 1 battery THAAD planned	

=== Watercraft ===
United States Navy
11 active, 9 planned (May 10, 2025) – aircraft carriers
Class	Builders	Type	Branch	Active	Notes	Image
Gerald R. Ford-class	Newport News Shipbuilding	Aircraft carrier	Navy	1	10 More planned	
Nimitz-class	Newport News Shipbuilding	Aircraft carrier	Navy	10	Class of 10	
2 active (May 10, 2025) – command ships
Blue Ridge-class	Philadelphia Naval Shipyard Newport News Shipbuilding and Drydock Co	Amphibious Command Ship	Navy	2	Class of 2	
37 active, 4 stored, 45 planned (May 10, 2025) – amphibious warfare ships
America-class	Huntington Ingalls Industries Ingalls Shipbuilding Division	Amphibious assault ship	Navy	2	9 more planned	
Wasp-class	Ingalls Shipbuilding	Amphibious assault ship	Navy	7	Class of 8	
San Antonio-class	Huntington Ingalls Industries	Amphibious transport dock	Navy	13	26 more planned	
Puller Class	General Dynamics NASSCO	Expeditionary Mobile Base	Navy	5	8 more planned	
Whidbey Island-class	Lockheed Shipbuilding and Construction Company	Dock landing ship	Navy	6	Class of 8 2 stored	
Harpers Ferry-class	Avondale Shipyard	Dock landing ship	Navy	4	Class of 4	
Austin class		Dock landing ship	Navy	0	1 stored	
51 active, 42 planned, 456 VLS Cells active, 1,680 VLS Cells planned (May 10, 2025) – nuclear attack submarines
Seawolf-class	General Dynamics Electric Boat	Attack submarine	Navy	3	Class of 3	
Los Angeles-class	Newport News Shipbuilding General Dynamics Electric Boat	Attack submarine	Navy	24	Class of 62 Slowly retiring	
Virginia-class	General Dynamics Electric Boat Huntington Ingalls Industries	Attack submarine	Navy	24	42 more planned	
14 active, 12 planned, 280 ICBM Cells active, 192 ICBM Cells planned (May 10, 2025) – nuclear ballistic missile submarines
Ohio-class	General Dynamics Electric Boat	Ballistic missile submarine	Navy	14	Class of 18, 4 converted to SSGN	
Columbia class	Electric Boat, Newport News Shipbuilding	Ballistic missile submarine	Navy	0	12 more planned	
4 active, 616 VLS Cells active (May 10, 2025) – nuclear guided missile submarine
Ohio-class	General Dynamics Electric Boat	Guided missile submarine	Navy	4	Converted from 18 Ohio Class SSBN	
7 active, 15 stored 854 VLS Cells active, 1,830 VLS Cells stored (May 10, 2025) – guided missile cruisers
Ticonderoga-class	Ingalls Shipbuilding Bath Iron Works	Cruiser	Navy	7	Class of 27 Planned to be retired by 2030 15 stored	
77 active, 25 planned, 4,906 VLS Cells active, 2,400 VLS Cells planned (May 10, 2025) – guided missile destroyer
Arleigh Burke-class	Ingalls Shipbuilding Bath Iron Works	Destroyer	Navy	74	25 more planned 21 Flight l, 7 Flight ll, 37 Flight llA, 8 Flight llATI, 1 Flight lll	
Zumwalt-class	Ingalls Shipbuilding Bath Iron Works	Destroyer	Navy	3	Class of 3 Being refitted with hypersonic missiles to replace gun system	
20 planned, 7 stored, 640 VLS Cells planned (May 10, 2025) – Guided missile frigate
Constellation-class	Fincantieri Marinette Marine	Frigate	Navy	0	20 more planned (cancelled)	
Oliver Hazard Perry class		Frigate	Navy	0	7 stored	
26 active, 7 stored, 2 planned (May 10, 2025) – littoral combat ships
Freedom-class	Fincantieri Marinette Marine	Littoral combat ship	Navy	10	1 more planned, 5 stored	
Independence-class	Austal USA	Littoral combat ship	Navy	16	1 more planned, 2 stored 15 are to become Mine countermeasures vessel	
8 active (May 10, 2025) – mine countermeasures vessel
Avenger-class	Peterson Shipbuilders Fincantieri Marinette Marine	Mine countermeasures vessel	Navy	8	Class of 14	
2 active (May 10, 2025) – submarine tender
Emory S. Land-class	Lockheed Shipbuilding and Construction Company	Submarine tender	Navy	2	Class of 3	
2 (May 10, 2025) – commissioned, not active ships
USS Pueblo	Kewaunee Shipbuilding and Engineering Corporation	Technical research ship	Navy	1	Held captive in North Korea. Not counted as part of deployed combat fleet.	
USS Constitution	Edmund Hartt's Shipyard	Classic frigate	Navy	1	Oldest commissioned ship afloat. Not counted as part of deployed combat fleet	
Non-commissioned ships
16 active, 1 stored, 18 planned (May 11, 2025) – replenishment oiler
Henry J. Kaiser-class	Avondale Shipyard	Fleet replenishment oiler	Navy (MSC)	14	Class of 16 1 stored	
John Lewis-class	National Steel and Shipbuilding Company	Fleet replenishment oiler	Navy (MSC)	2	18 more planned	
16 active, 2 stored (May 11, 2025) – dry cargo replenishment ships
Lewis and Clark-class	General Dynamics National Steel and Shipbuilding Company (NASSCO)	Dry cargo ship	Navy (MSC)	14	Class of 14	
Supply-class	National Steel and Shipbuilding Company	Fast combat support ship	Navy (MSC)	2	Class of 4 2 stored	
assorted support ships
USNS Invincible	Tacoma Boatbuilding Company	Missile range instrumentation ship	Navy (MSC)	1	Class of 18. Converted from ocean surveillance ship.	
Howard O. Lorenzen-class	VT Halter Marine	Missile range instrumentation ship	Navy (MSC)	1		
Waters-class	Avondale Industries, Inc	Navigation test support ship	Navy (MSC)	1		
Pathfinder-class	Halter Marine	Survey ship	Navy (MSC)	6	Class of 7.	
Sea-based X-band radar		Mobile early warning radar platform	Navy (MSC)	1	`	
Victorious-class	McDermott Shipyards	Ocean Surveillance Ship	Navy (MSC)	4		
Impeccable-class	Tampa Shipyards	Ocean Surveillance Ship	Navy (MSC)	1		
Guam-class	Austal USA	High Speed Transport	Navy (MSC)	1	Former Hawaii Superferry ship MV Huakai	
Watson-class	National Steel and Shipbuilding Company	Vehicle Cargo Ship	Navy (MSC)	8		
2nd Lt. John P. Bobo-class	General Dynamics Quincy Shipbuilding Division	Strategic Sealift Ship	Navy (MSC)	5		
Bob Hope-class	Avondale Shipyard	Vehicle Cargo Ship	Navy (MSC)	7		
Powhatan-class	Marinette Marine Corporation	Ocean Tug	Navy (MSC)	4	Class of 7	
Mercy-class	National Steel and Shipbuilding Company	Hospital Ship	Navy (MSC)	2	Former San Clemente-class oil tankers	
Safeguard-class	Peterson Builders	Salvage Ship	Navy (MSC)	2	Class of 4, 2 Retired	
Montford Point-class	National Steel and Shipbuilding Company	Expeditionary Transfer Dock	Navy (MSC)	4		
Zeus-class	National Steel and Shipbuilding Company	Cable Ship	Navy (MSC)	1		
Spearhead-class	Austal USA	Expeditionary Fast Transport	Navy (MSC)	14	5 more planned	
Special Warfare and Coastal Riverine Force
Combat Rubber Raiding Craft	Zodiac Milpro	Inflatable Boat	Navy			
Small Unit Riverine Craft	Raytheon Naval & Maritime Integrated Systems	Rigid Buoyant Boat	Navy			
Riverine Command Boat	Dockstavarvet	Riverine Fast Assault Craft	Navy			
Rigid Raider	BAE Systems Surface Ships	Fast Assault Craft	Navy			
Mark V Special Operations Craft	VT Halter Marine	Special Operations Craft	Navy			
Special Operations Craft – Riverine		Special Operations Craft	Navy			
Mark VI Patrol Boat	SAFE Boats International	Special Operations Craft	Navy	38	10 more planned	
Landing craft
Landing Craft Air Cushion	Textron Marine and Land SystemsAvondale Gulfport Marine	Hovercraft landing craft	Navy	74		
Landing craft utility 1466, 1610 & 1627 classes		Landing Craft Utility	Navy	32		
United States Coast Guard
Cutters
Class	Builders	Type	Branch	Active	Notes	Image
Legend-class	Ingalls Shipbuilding	National Security Cutter	Coast Guard	10	1 more planned, Another 1 More Optional	
Heritage-Class	Eastern Shipbuilding, Austal USA	Offshore Patrol Cutter	Coast Guard	0	11 more planned, Another 14 More Optional	
Famous-class	Robert Derecktor Shipyard Inc Tacoma Boatbuilding Company	Medium Endurance Cutter	Coast Guard	13	Class of 13	
Reliance-class	Todd Shipyards American Ship Building Company U.S. Coast Guard Yard Christy Corporation	Medium Endurance Cutter	Coast Guard	12	Class of 16	
Edenton-class	Brooke Marine	Medium Endurance Cutter	Coast Guard	1	Former USS Edenton (ATS-1)	
Sentinel-class	Bollinger Shipyards,	Fast Response Cutter	Coast Guard	57	10 more planned planned, 14 More Optional	
Island-class	Bollinger Shipyards,	Patrol Boat	Coast Guard	3	Class of 49	
Marine Protector-class	Bollinger Shipyards,	Patrol Boat	Coast Guard	61	Class of 77	
Healy-class	Avondale Industries	Icebreaker	Coast Guard	1		
Polar-class	Lockheed Shipbuilding and Construction Company	Icebreaker	Coast Guard	1	Class of 2	
Mackinaw-class	Fincantieri Marinette Marine	Icebreaker	Coast Guard	1	Used primarily in the Great Lakes	
Juniper-class	Fincantieri Marinette Marine	Seagoing Buoy Tender	Coast Guard	16		
Keeper-class	Fincantieri Marinette Marine	Coastal Buoy Tender	Coast Guard	14		
Bay-class	Tacoma Boatbuilding Company	Icebreaking Tugboat	Coast Guard	9	10 planned	
100 Foot-class		Inland Buoy Tender	Coast Guard	2		
100 Foot-class		Inland Construction Tender	Coast Guard	3		
65 Foot-class		Inland Buoy Tender	Coast Guard	2		
USCGC Eagle	Blohm & Voss, Hamburg	Sail Training Vessel	Coast Guard	1	Former Nazi German Barque Horst Wessel	
160 Foot-class		Inland Construction Tender	Coast Guard	4		
75 Foot-class		Inland Construction Tender	Coast Guard			
75 Foot-class		River Buoy Tender	Coast Guard			
65 Foot-class		River Buoy Tender	Coast Guard			
65 Foot-class		Small Harbor Tug	Coast Guard			
Boats
52-foot Motor Lifeboat	U.S. Coast Guard Yard	Lifeboat	Coast Guard	4		
47-foot Motor Lifeboat	Textron Marine	Lifeboat	Coast Guard	227		
Aids to Navigation Boat		Aids to Navigation Boat	Coast Guard	145		
32-foot Transportable Port Security Boat	Kvichak Marine Industries	Security Boat	Coast Guard			
25-foot Transportable Port Security Boat	Boston Whaler	Security Boat	Coast Guard		To be transferred to the Army	
Short Range Prosecutor		Rigid Hulled Inflatable	Coast Guard			
Long Range Interceptor		Rigid Hulled Inflatable	Coast Guard			
Defender-class	SAFE Boats International	Response Boat	Coast Guard			
Response boat – small II		Response boat	Coast Guard			
Response boat – medium	Fincantieri Marinette Marine	Response boat	Coast Guard			
United States Army
Class	Builders	Type	Branch	Active	Notes	Image
General Frank S. Besson-class	VT Halter Marine	logistics support vessel	Army	8	Class of 8	
Runnymede-class	VT Halter Marine	Large landing craft	Army	35	Class of 35	
LCM-8		Landing craft mechanized	Army	40	Class of 40	
MGen. Nathanael Greene-class	VT Halter Marine	large coastal tug	Army	6	Class of 6	
United States Air Force
Class	Builders	Type	Branch	Active	Notes	Image
Rising Star-class	Swiftships yard	tugboat	Air Force	1	Class of 1	
MR-120		drone recovery vessel	Air Force	3	Class of 3	

== Attire ==
=== Uniforms ===
Uniforms
Dress uniforms
Branch	Name	Notes	Image
Army	Army Service Uniform	Currently used as both service and dress uniform. Being replaced by Army Greens as service uniform.	
Marine Corps	Blue Dress		Officers Enlisted
Marine Corps	Blue–White Dress	Authorized for summer wear for officers only.	
Marine Corps	Red Dress	Worn by the United States Marine Band and United States Marine Drum and Bugle Corps only.	
Navy	Service Dress Blue	Worn in the winter, and year-round for travel.	Officer / CPO Enlisted
Navy	Service Dress White	Worn in the summer.	Officer / CPO Enlisted
Air Force	Air Force Service Uniform	Currently worn as both service and dress uniforms.	
Space Force	Space Force Service Uniform	Same as Air Force Service Dress Uniform.	
Coast Guard	Service Dress Blue	Worn year round by junior enlisted personnel and in winter only by officers and chief petty officers.	
Coast Guard	Service Dress White	Same as Navy Service Dress Whites, but worn with Coast Guard insignia. Worn by officers only and chief petty officers only in summer.	
Service uniforms
Branch	Name	Notes	Image
Army	Army Service Uniform	Gradually being phased out in this role. Will be completely restricted to dress wear by 2028.	
Army	Army Greens	Gradually replacing the Army Service Uniform in this role from 2020.	
Marine Corps	Service Uniform		Officers Enlisted
Navy	Service Khaki Uniform	Worn by officers and chief petty officers only.	
Navy	Summer White Service Uniform	Worn in Summer by officers and chief petty officers only.	
Navy	Navy Service Uniform	Worn year round by junior enlisted personnel.	
Air Force	Air Force Service Dress Uniform	Worn as both a service and a dress uniform.	
Space Force	Space Force Service Dress Uniform	Same as Air Force Service Dress Uniform.	
Coast Guard	Winter Dress Blue Uniform	Worn in winter.	
Coast Guard	Tropical Blue Uniform	Worn in warm weather and year-round for general office wear.	
Combat / Working uniforms
Branch	Name	Notes	Image
Army	Army Combat Uniform		
Marine Corps	Marine Corps Combat Utility Uniform		
Navy	Navy Working Uniform		
Navy	Shipboard Working Uniform		
Air Force	Airman Battle Uniform	ABU completely phased out on 1 April 2021.	
Air Force	Army Combat Uniform	Standard uniform of the USAF. Worn with brown name and rank / Air Force tapes. Completely replaced ABU on 1 April 2021.	
Space Force	Army Combat Uniform	Worn with blue name / Space Force tapes.	
Coast Guard	Operational Dress Uniform		
Coast Guard	Navy Working Uniform	Worn by Port Security Units, Law Enforcement Detachments, and personnel deployed overseas.	

=== Camouflage patterns ===
Camouflage patterns
List of current camouflage patterns and uniforms
Branch	Camouflage pattern	Image	Picture
Army Operational Camouflage Pattern used for the current Army Combat Uniform (ACU). Pattern is known as OCP – OEF camouflage pattern.
Marine Corps	MARPAT pattern, used for the Marine Corps Combat Utility Uniform (MCCUU) in two variants, woodland and desert.		
Navy	Navy Working Uniform (NWU). Comes in two variants – standard woodland for garrison use and desert for deployment use.		
Air Force Operational Camouflage Pattern used on Army Combat Uniform (ACU) which has completely replaced the |Digitalized tigerstripe Airman Battle Uniform (ABU).			
Coast Guard	Operational Dress Uniform (ODU). MultiCam		)
SOCOM	Common uniform for the SOCOM is still in development. Currently, MultiCam is widely used, replacing old BDUs.		

== See also ==
- United States Armed Forces
- List of equipment of the United States Air Force
- List of equipment of the United States Army
- List of equipment of the United States Navy
- List of equipment of the United States Coast Guard
- List of equipment of the United States Marine Corps
