= Ciener Ultimate Over/Under =

- Type: Shotgun
- Place of origin: United States

Production history
- Designer: Johnathan Arthur Ciener

Specifications
- Cartridge: 12 gauge
- Action: Pump action
- Rate of fire: Manual
- Effective firing range: 50 m (55 yd)
- Feed system: Internal tubular magazine

The Ciener Ultimate Over/Under system is a modified shotgun designed by Johnathan Arthur Ciener. It is mounted under an M16 variant in order to facilitate CQB combat. It is similar to, but uses a different mounting system than the Knight's Armament Company Masterkey or the accessory weapon configuration of the Remington 870 MPS.

The system consists of a modified shotgun mounted on an M16 or M4 assault rifle, in an underbarrel configuration, much like the M203 grenade launcher. The method of attachment differs in that the Ciener system attaches to the host weapon using a yoke adapter to join the receivers of both weapons and an adaptor to join the shotgun's barrel to the rifle's bayonet lug. Usually, a Remington 870 12 gauge pump-action shotgun is used. However, there are examples of other types of shotguns used, notably a modified Remington 1100. At the time of its manufacture, it could be made from a supplied shotgun for $250, $435 for a modified Remington 870, or $675 for a modified Remington 1100.

The shotgun cannot be operated independently because of the yoke adaptor. The M16's magazine well must be used as a makeshift pistol grip. Independent stocks and grips for the Remington 870 are available for use, but they are incompatible with the M16 barrel mount.

The Ciener Ultimate has allegedly been used by Delta Force, and the design's unique mounting system is mentioned in Mark Bowden's Black Hawk Down: A Story of Modern War. Paul Howe was using a "CAR-15, a black futuristic-looking weapon with a pump-action shotgun attached to the bayonet lug in front." The Ciener design was the only underbarrel shotgun to use the host weapon's bayonet lug as an attachment point at that time.

== See also ==
- Combat shotgun
- KAC Masterkey
- M26 MASS
- Remington 870

== Notes ==
- "Firearm Photo Archive". Security Arms. Archived from the original on 2011-08-05.
