= Breaching round =

Shotgun shell made especially for door breaching

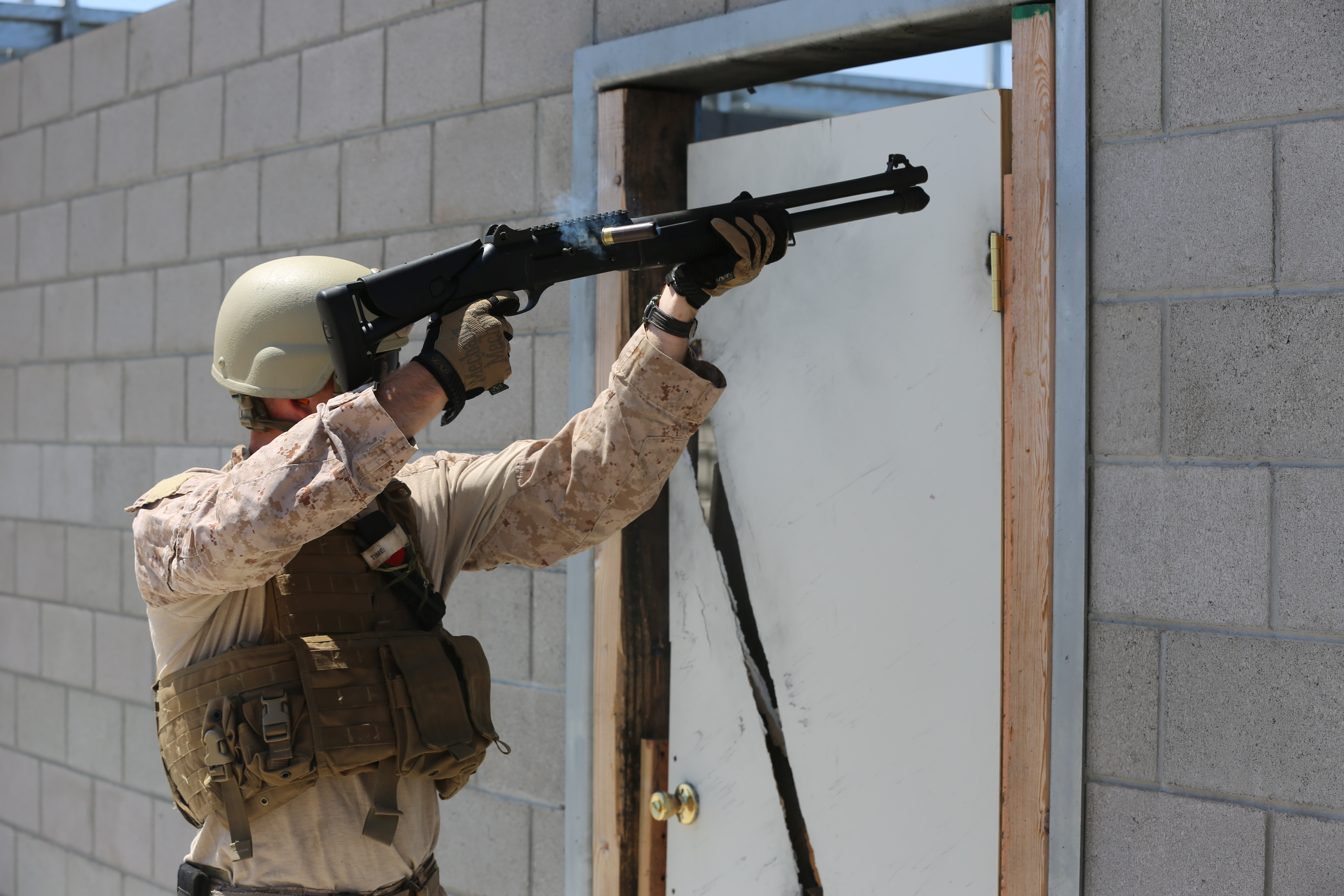
A US Marine practices shotgun door-breaching techniques

A breaching round or slug-shot is a shotgun shell specially made for door breaching. It is typically fired at a range of 6 inches (15 cm) or less, aimed at the hinges or the area between the doorknob and lock and doorjamb, and is designed to destroy the object it hits and then disperse into a relatively harmless powder.

== Design and construction ==
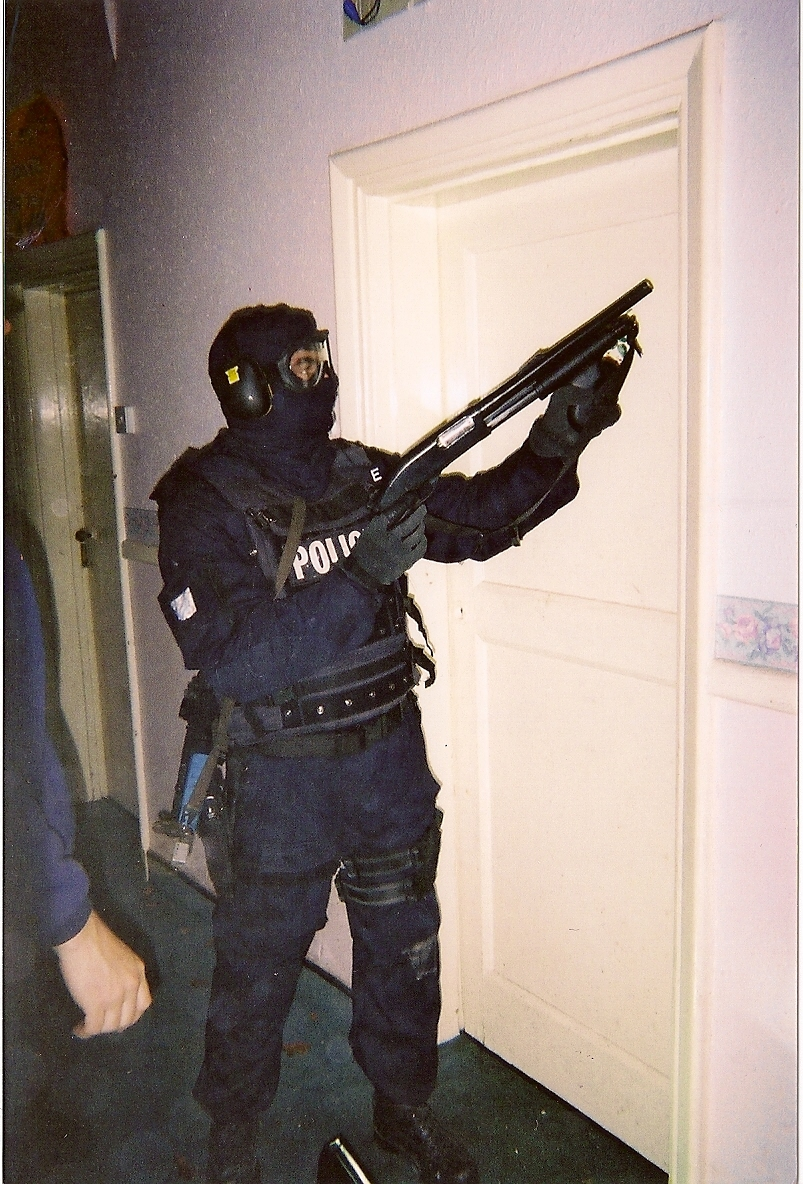
A British police team member using shotgun Hatton rounds in training

Breaching rounds are designed to destroy door deadbolts, locks, and hinges without risking lives by ricocheting or by flying on at lethal speed through the door, as traditional buckshot can. These frangible rounds are made of a dense sintered material, often metal powder in a binder such as wax, which can destroy a lock or hinge and then immediately disperse. They are used by military and SWAT teams to quickly force entry into a locked room. Amongst police, these rounds are nicknamed "master keys", and their use is known as "Avon calling", alluding to the Avon brand of cosmetics which was sold door-to-door. (Note: One brand of breaching round, made by Royal Arms, uses the brand name Avon; see Adam Geibel (May 25, 2004). "The Shotgun Approach". Special Operations Technology. Archived from the original on 29 March 2005.) Ideally, breaching rounds may be used in a standard combat shotgun or riot shotgun, or in a specialized shotgun, often attached to a rifle, such as the KAC Masterkey or M26 Modular Accessory Shotgun System. The most effective use of this round is with a "stand-off breacher" attached to the muzzle of a specially converted shotgun. The stand-off is held on the surface of the door and vents gases to prevent overpressure. The British SAS also use these breaching rounds in their shotguns-most commonly the Remington pump action.

Though designed not to endanger people behind or around a door, a breaching round is easily lethal if fired directly at a human target.

Examples of breaching rounds:

- Royal Arms has made the TESAR round for over 40 years using a frangible copper slug of various weights and configurations, with different loads for different applications. It is used by many military and law enforcement agencies around the world.
- The US military M1030 breaching round is a 12-gauge, 2 3/4-inch (70 mm) shell that uses a 40-gram (1.4 oz) projectile made of powdered steel, bound with wax.
- The Clucas Method of Entry Hatton round is a 12-gauge, 3-inch (76 mm) magnum shell that uses a 43-gram (1.5 oz) frangible projectile, consisting of a high-density wax binder.
- Firequest makes a 12 gauge 2 3/4-inch (70 mm) frangible slug, named the door breaching cartridge. The slug consists of copper and tin powder.
