= MAUL (shotgun) =

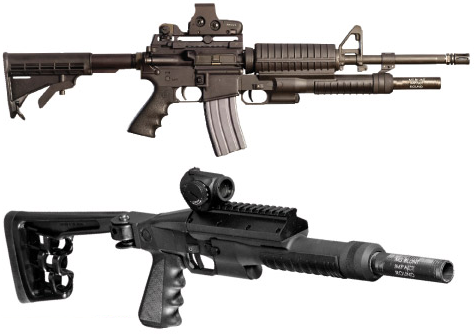
- MAUL shotgun, mounted under a Colt Law Enforcement Carbine above and standalone below
- Type: Shotgun
- Place of origin: Australia

Production history
- Manufacturer: Metal Storm
- Variants: Underslung, standalone

Specifications
- Mass: 0.8 kilograms (1.8 lb) (underslung)
- Cartridge: 12 gauge (proprietary)
- Action: Superposed load, electrically fired
- Feed system: 5 shot preloaded barrel

The Multi-shot Accessory Underbarrel Launcher, or MAUL, is a combat shotgun designed by defunct Brisbane-based company Metal Storm.

== Design ==
The MAUL is a shotgun based on Metal Storm's electronically initiated superposed-load technology. In this concept multiple projectiles, in this case of 12-gauge bore, are loaded nose to tail in a single gun barrel with propellant packed between them. Each projectile is ignited sequentially using an electrically fired primer: the electrical charge is provided by a battery. The weapon fires once per trigger pull: while in effect this is semi-automatic, in strict terms it is not as no energy from firing is used to automate any part of the weapon's operating cycle. Designed to be used as either a standalone weapon or an underslung module of a combat rifle such as M4 or M16 via the use of Picatinny rail, it can also be used in a standalone configuration through the addition of a pistol grip, folding stock or both. The central module is made of carbon fiber, while the barrels are steel. The resulting weapon weighs less than 800 grams (1.8 lb),.

In its underslung configuration, it was boresight-aligned to the host gun's sighting system.

It was intended to fire a range of loads; buckshot, slug, Door breaching slugs, and several kinds of less-lethal loads including blunt-force, electro-muscular incapacitation and frangible nose chemical and marker munitions. Loads were intended to be provided in their own munition tubes, with the operator switching tubes to change ammunition type.

Metal Storm reported the first shoulder-firing of the MAUL during tests on 24 April 2009 at its test facilities in Chantilly, Virginia.

== Contracts ==
- Papua New Guinea: As of 3 August 2010, Metal Storm signed a contract with the Correctional Services Minister Tony Aimo to supply 500 standalone MAULs and 10,000 less-lethal barrels for use by correctional services officers. The contract was never ratified due to the company failing to produce the weaponry before it folded in 2012.

== See also ==
- Knight's Armament Company Masterkey - an originator for the underslung shotgun concept
- M26 Modular Accessory Shotgun System - comparable underslung shotgun adopted by the US Army
