= C-More Systems =

Vertu Corporation, d/b/a C-MORE Systems, is an American manufacturer of firearms and firearm accessories. Vertu was established in Manassas, Virginia in 1993 and the C-MORE Competition name was established in 1999. Its primary products are red dot sights, marketed as being for M1911 pistols, Glock pistols, and AR-15s. Its sights are also recommended by FN Herstal for the M249 SAW and M240 machine gun. The company also manufactures the M26 Modular Accessory Shotgun System for the United States armed forces .

== See also ==
- Aimpoint
- EOTech
- Trijicon
