= M577A4 armored treatment vehicle =

The M577A4 armored treatment vehicle (ATV) is a U.S. Army variant of the M577 command post carrier made by United Defense (now part of BAE Systems) which has been modified to function as an emergency medical treatment vehicle for personnel wounded or injured on the battlefield. It replaced the M577A3 emergency medical treatment vehicle in U.S. military service and is designed to operate in conjunction with the M113A4 armored medical evacuation vehicle (AMEV).

== Background ==
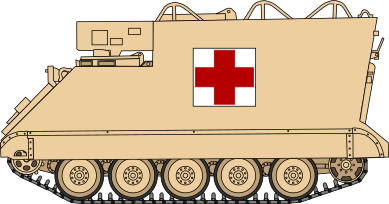
M577 emergency medical treatment vehicle

Ambulance versions of the M113 have existed for nearly as long as the vehicle has been in production, and fielded by many different countries. During the Vietnam War the U.S. Army originally introduced the M113 medevac vehicle to function as an armoured ambulance; however, the M577 with its raised roof and greater interior space offered the advantages of the ability to carry two extra litters (up from four to six) and medical personnel to stand up inside the vehicle while tending to patients. Also, the vehicle's extension tent, which attaches over the rear cargo ramp, allowed the M577 to function as an emergency treatment centre, and its auxiliary generator (normally located on the roof but able to be removed) provided sufficient electric power required for lighting and other medical theatre equipment.

With increasing standardisation upon the M113 and M113A1 armored ambulance, the litters fitted to M577s which were being used as ambulances were removed and the vehicles were designated as the M577/A1 battalion aid station (BAS) and tasked solely in the role of emergency medical treatment. Following introduction of later A2 and A3 versions of the base vehicle, vehicles in U.S. service were re-designated as the M577A2/3 emergency medical treatment vehicle (EMTV). In this configuration, the M577A2/3 EMVT was complemented by the M113A2/3 armored ambulance.

In accordance with the terms of the Geneva Conventions regarding the treatment and transportation of wounded personnel, these vehicles were required to be unarmed and their non-combatant role indicated by large red crosses on a white background painted on their exterior.

== Development ==
In the early 1990s the United States Army Training and Doctrine Command (TRADOC), as part of the review of the M113A2/3 armoured ambulance also reviewed the M577A2/3 EMTV, and identified a number of deficiencies including:

- inadequate casualty treatment capacity
- poor patient and attendant ride stabilisation
- limited patient in-transit support by medical personnel
- inadequate space for supplies, equipment and personnel
- inadequate space and equipment for a trauma treatment team to provide emergency medical treatment inside the vehicle
- inability to keep up with its supported units on the battlefield

It was determined that the primary reason for the deficiencies in the EMTV was that the M577 is a command post vehicle, not a dedicated medical treatment system, and if a program to upgrade or develop a suitable vehicle is not funded, armoured units would continue to use a vehicle which is inadequate for its stated mission and hence contribute to higher mortality and morbidity rates. As a result of the review, the Army's Deputy Chief of Staff for Operations approved the mission need statement (MNS) for medical evacuation for combat casualty care in December 1995; while the M113A4 AMEV was identified as the #1 priority in the 1997 Army Modernization Plan Combat Health Support Annex, as this vehicle did not provide a medical treatment capability, this requirement would be fulfilled through an upgrade of the existing M577A2/3 to a similar level as that of the proposed M113A4, and addressed within the same Operational Requirements Document (ORD) as that of the AMEV. Approved by TRADOC on 18 October 1996, a design was drafted and a prototype vehicle developed based upon the latest variant of the M577, the A4.

== Design ==
Unlike the M113A4 armored medical evacuation vehicle (AMEV), which features a lengthened chassis with an additional roadwheel, the M577A4 retains the standard 5-axle chassis, (Note: A lengthened 6-axle M577 chassis was first demonstrated in the M577A2E2 in 1988, but as of 2007 still remain a prototype; it is unknown why this option was not chosen for the M577A4 ATV.) although the hull now features external fuel tanks similar to those found on the M113A3. However, the vehicle shares common components with the AMEV.

The upgraded M577A4 includes the RISE (Reliability Improvements for Selected Equipment) power package consisting of the turbocharged Detroit Diesel 400 hp 6V53TA engine and Allison X200-4A automatic transmission with integrated hydrostatic steering and braking in a compact and rugged unit providing four forward and two reverse gears. This provides the vehicle with sufficient power and performance to maintain pace with mechanised front line units and their equipment (specifically, the M1 Abrams main battle tank and M2 Bradley IFV), particularly on-road. The A4 upgrade package also provides:

- engine noise reduction
- over-pressured NBC air filtration system
- improved lighting and storage
- digital communication interfaces
- MSE link-up capability and three-net communication capability
- enhanced armour and spall protection

In addition, the vehicle provides increased mission profile-specific capability compared to previous versions through improved medical sciences equipment.

== Current status ==
As the M577A4 did not feature a lengthened chassis, the issue of inadequate space and equipment for a trauma treatment team to provide emergency medical treatment inside of vehicle remained, and the ATV is currently used only to transport the medical team and equipment (the team must unload the equipment from the vehicle and provide treatment outside in the tent extension or other medical facilities). (Note: The issue of lack of adequate internal space within the M113A2/2 EMTV as identified in the TRADOC review conducted in the early 1990s was again raised in the 1997 CEFA, along with the issue of a lack of ride stabilisation and occupant comfort in cross-country situation as a result of the M577A4 atv not adopting a lengthened chassis. The recommendation of the CEFA was the adoption of a new vehicle based upon the M2 Bradley IFV or M270 Multiple Launch Rocket System, and it therefore appears that the M577-based ATV was considered an interim design until the introduction of the Armored Multi-Purpose Vehicle, a program which has encountered significant delays.)

In September 2020 the new armored multi-purpose vehicle began entering service with the U.S. Army, resulting in a phasing out of M113-based vehicles. The M577A4 ATV (and remaining M577A2/3 emergency medical treatment vehicles) are due to be replaced by the M1285 medical treatment vehicle.

== Similar vehicles ==
- M113A4 armored medical evacuation vehicle
- M1133 medical evacuation vehicle
- YPR-765 PRGWT armored medical evacuation vehicle
