= M113A4 armored medical evacuation vehicle =

US Army vehicle

The M113A4 armored medical evacuation vehicle (AMEV) is a U.S. Army variant of a M113 armored personnel carrier (APC) made by United Defense (now part of BAE Systems) modified to function as a battlefield emergency medical evacuation (medevac) vehicle. It replaced the M113A3 armored ambulance in U.S. military service and is designed to operate in conjunction with the M577A4 armored treatment vehicle.

== Background ==
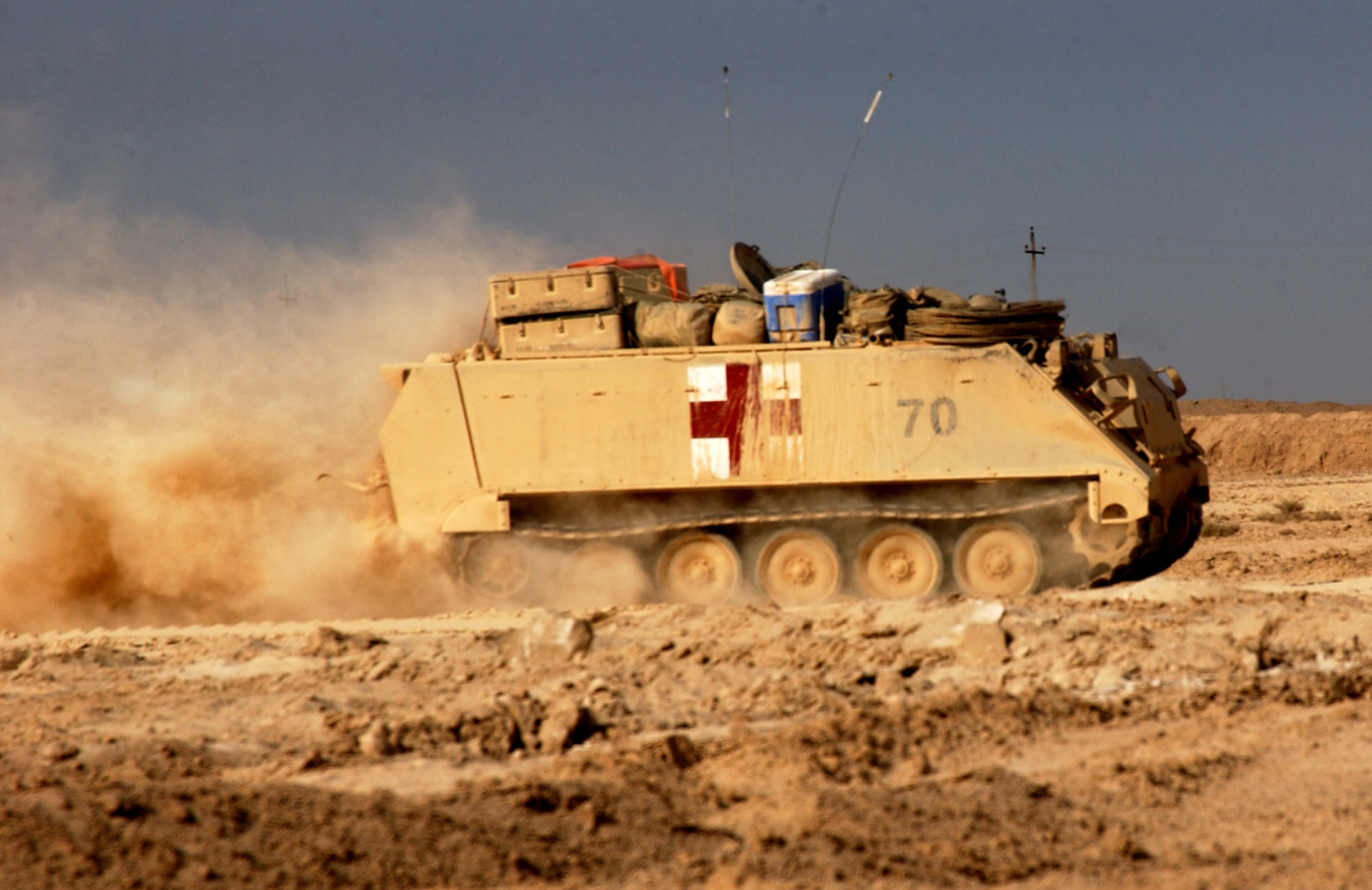
M113A3 armored ambulance in Fallujah, Iraq, 2004

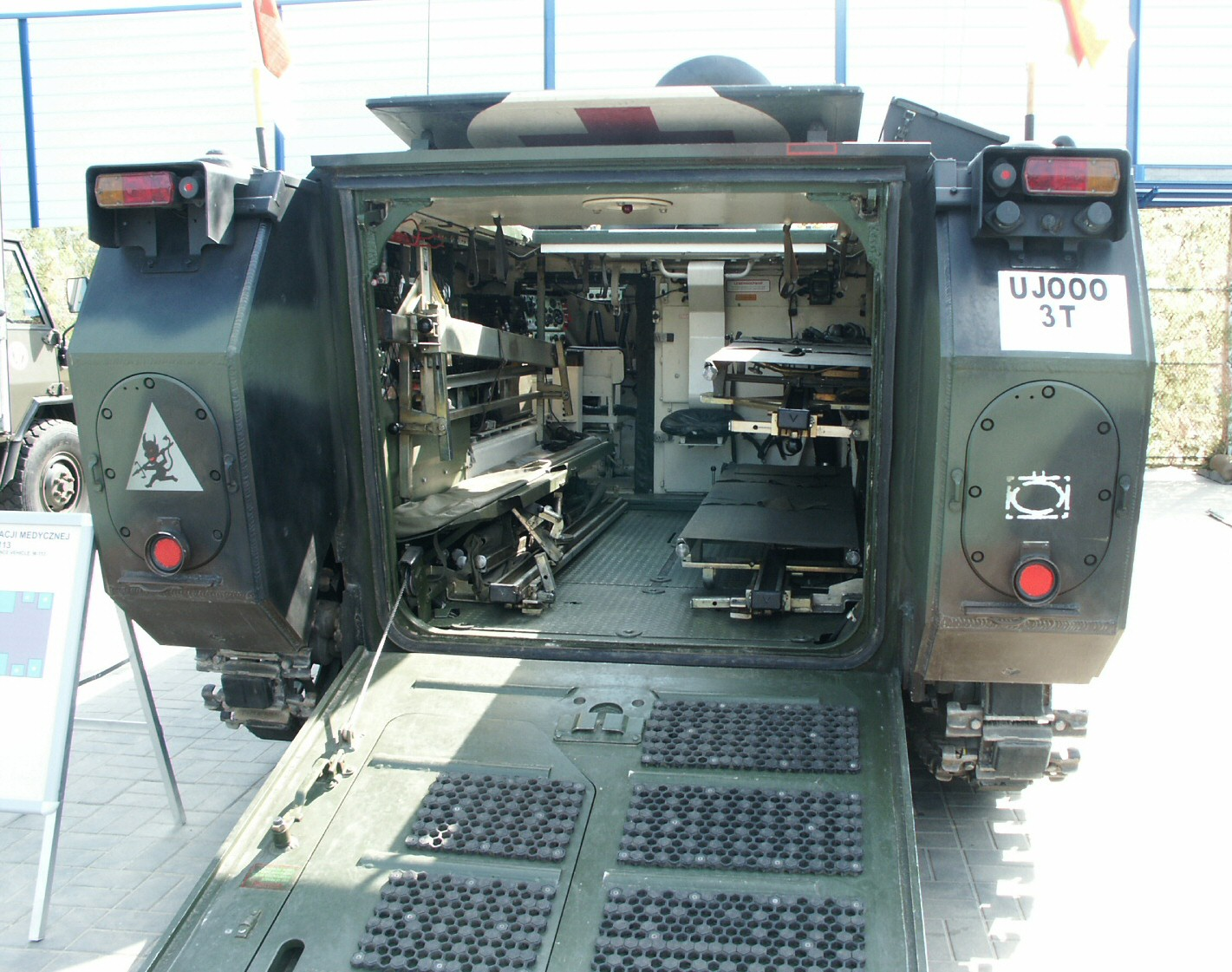
Interior of a Polish Army ambulance, with litters visible along the right of the interior

Ambulance versions of the M113 have existed for nearly as long as the vehicle has been in production, and fielded by many different countries. During the Vietnam War the U.S. Army introduced the M113 medevac vehicle to function as an armored ambulance for the treatment and evacuation of wounded personnel from the battlefield. Based upon the standard version of an M113, the seats in rear of the vehicle that were normally used by troops were replaced with two or four litters along either side, attached by chains suspended from the ceiling to the floor. Medical equipment and supplies were carried in internal stowage boxes. Following introduction of later A2 and A3 versions of the base vehicle, vehicles in U.S. service were re-designated as the M113A2/3 armored ambulance.

Similar vehicles were also created based on the M577 variant, which with their increased interior space were able to accommodate up to six litters, and their raised roof offered the benefit of allowing the crew to stand while tending to the wounded. The vehicle's tent extension, which attaches to the rear over the cargo ramp, was often used as an emergency treatment centre.

In accordance with the terms of the Geneva Conventions regarding the treatment and transportation of wounded personnel, these vehicles are required to be unarmed and their non-combatant role indicated by large red crosses on a white background painted on their exterior. Medical personnel are permitted to carry small arms for the purpose of defending themselves and their patients.

== Development ==
In the early 1990s the United States Army Training and Doctrine Command (TRADOC) initiated a review of the M113A2/3 armored ambulance and identified a number of deficiencies including:

- inadequate casualty evacuation and treatment capacity
- poor patient and attendant ride stabilisation
- limited patient in-transit support by medical personnel
- inadequate space for supplies, equipment and personnel
- inability to keep up with its supported units on the battlefield

As a result of the review, the Army's Deputy Chief of Staff for Operations approved the Mission Need Statement (MNS) for Medical Evacuation for Combat Casualty Care in December 1995, which resulted in an Operational Requirements Document (ORD) for the exploration of options and funding for procurement. Approved by TRADOC on 18 October 1996, and including options for tracked and wheeled vehicles and a new vehicle based upon the M2 Bradley infantry fighting vehicle (IFV). A design was drafted and a prototype vehicle developed based upon the latest variant of the M113, the A4.

In March 1997 the prototype was tested the National Training Center (NTC) at Fort Irwin, California, in Rotation 97-06 of the Task Force XXI Advanced Warfighting Experiment (TF XXI AWE). The vehicle generally performed favourably, providing performance similar to or better than that of other modern medical evacuation vehicles and aircraft; however, small concerns were noted (mostly in regards to the safety and security of stowages) which were fed back into the design process for improvement.

The final OPTEC test report of July 1997 noted that the AMEV "projects and sustains the force through":

- improved survivability from enhanced armour protection
- improved automotive, electrical, communications, interior design, environmental support, chassis compatibility, and machine/soldier interface
- increased operational mobility (allowing mobility equal to supported forces)
- decreased mortality and morbidity due to the addition of on-board medical treatment capability

The Combat Service Support (CSS) Enabler Functional Assessment (CEFA) for the AMEV dated December 1997 noted that the AMEV concept was "sound" and that the vehicle should replace the M113A2/3 armored ambulance on a one-for-one basis.

== Design ==
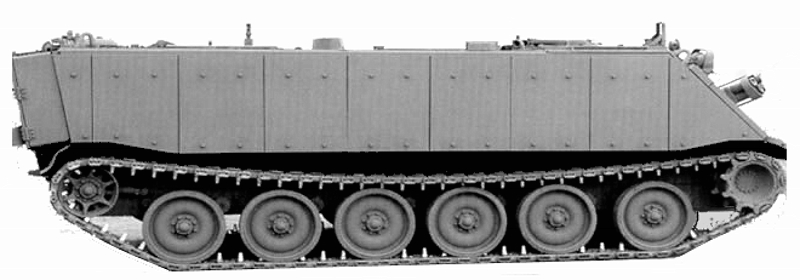
Stretched M113A4 chassis used by AMEV

The AMEV utilises a high-mobility stretched M113A4 chassis as used by the Mobile Tactical Vehicle Light (MTVL), with the standard M113 hull lengthened 34 inches and equipped with an additional road wheel (for a total of six on each side), to give the AMEV excellent cross-country capability and ride characteristics. The vehicle shares common components with the M577A4 Armored Treatment Vehicle.

The upgraded M113A4 includes the RISE (Reliability Improvements for Selected Equipment) power package consisting of the turbocharged Detroit Diesel 400 hp 6V53TA engine and Allison X200-4A automatic transmission with integrated hydrostatic steering and braking in a compact and rugged unit providing four forward and two reverse gears. This provides the vehicle with sufficient power and performance to maintain pace with mechanised front line units and their equipment (specifically, the M1 Abrams main battle tank and M2 Bradley IFV), both on- and off-road. The A4 upgrade package also provides:

- engine noise reduction
- over-pressured NBC air filtration system
- improved lighting and storage
- digital communication interfaces
- MSE link-up capability and three-net communication capability
- enhanced armour and spall protection

In addition, mission profile-specific capability and equipment includes:

- accommodation for four litters or eight ambulatory patients
- movable attendant's seat
- patient support systems

== Current status ==
In September 2020 the U.S. Army began phasing the AMEV out of service, to be replaced by the similar version of the Armored Multi-Purpose Vehicle, the M1284 Medical Evacuation Vehicle (MEV).

== Similar vehicles ==
- M577A4 armored treatment vehicle
- M1133 medical evacuation vehicle
- YPR-765 PRGWT armored medical evacuation vehicle
