= Lockheed Martin Aeronautics =

Subsidiary headquartered in Fort Worth, Texas

- Type: Division
- Industry: Aerospace; Defense
- Predecessors: Lockheed Corporation; Martin Marietta
- Founded: 1995; 31 years ago
- Headquarters: Fort Worth, Texas
- Key people: James D. Taiclet (chairman, president & CEO); Bruce L. Tanner (executive vice president and CFO)
- Revenue: $17.769 billion (2016)
- Operating income: $1.877 billion (2016)
- Number of employees: ▲ +30,000 (2025)
- Website: www.lockheedmartin.com/en-us/who-we-are/business-areas/aeronautics.html

Lockheed Martin Aeronautics Company is a major unit of Lockheed Martin with headquarters at Air Force Plant 4 in Fort Worth, Texas, with additional facilities are located Marietta, Georgia and Palmdale, California.

Palmdale is home to the Advanced Development Programs (ADP), informally known as the "Skunk Works". Various subassemblies are produced at locations in Florida, Mississippi, Pennsylvania, and West Virginia.

The company draws upon the history of the former Lockheed and Martin Marietta corporations. While the formation of Lockheed Martin in 1995 was a merger of equals, by far the greatest contribution to Lockheed Martin Aeronautics was the product portfolio of Lockheed. This included the C-5, C-130, and C-141 transports as well as the F-2, F-16 (purchased from General Dynamics), F-117, F-22, and F-35 Lightning II.

The most important project by far to Lockheed Martin Aeronautics is the F-35 Lightning II (JSF). Worth a potential $200bn the initial order book is approximately 3,000 excluding almost guaranteed export orders. Lockheed also supports its F-22 air dominance fighter in USAF service.

== History ==
On May 22, 2024, the unit was sanctioned by the Chinese government due to arms sales to Taiwan.

== Products ==
- Lockheed Martin A-4AR Fightinghawk
- Lockheed C-130 Hercules : First developed by the Lockheed Corporation in the 1950s, the Hercules is still produced as the C-130J Super Hercules. The aircraft is produced at Lockheed Martin's Marietta, Georgia facility.
- Lockheed Martin C-130J Super Hercules
- Lockheed C-141 StarLifter : First flown in 1963, the Starlifter is a strategic airlifter. The C-141 was produced at Marietta.
- Lockheed C-5 Galaxy : The C-5 is the largest strategic airlifter in the USAF inventory and one of the largest aircraft in the world. The Galaxy was produced at Lockheed's Marietta facility and it is here that the current avionics and engine modernization programs are being undertaken.
- Lockheed F-117 Nighthawk : The F-117 stealth aircraft is a product of Lockheed's Skunk Works. First flown in 1981, the aircraft has been put out of service in favor of the F-22.
- Lockheed Martin F-16 Fighting Falcon : The F-16, which made its maiden flight in December 1976, was first developed and produced by General Dynamics. In 1993, Lockheed Corporation acquired General Dynamics' Fort Worth division, the production center F-16.
- Mitsubishi F-2 : Japanese development of the Lockheed Martin F-16 Fighting Falcon, heavily modified to Japan's requirements. Lockheed Martin Aeronautics acts as subcontractor to Mitsubishi Heavy Industries.
- Lockheed Martin F-22 Raptor
- Lockheed Martin FB-22
- Lockheed Martin F-35 Lightning II : Lockheed Martin (with partners BAE Systems and Northrop Grumman) won the contract to build the Joint Strike Fighter in 2001. With initial orders of approximately 3,000 aircraft, this is of major importance to Lockheed Martin.
- Lockheed P-3 Orion : The current maritime patrol plane of many nations, but principally the US Navy. Lockheed submitted a remanufactured P-3 design as part of the Multimission Maritime Aircraft (MMA) competition, but lost to Boeing's 737 based design.
- Lockheed S-3 Viking : The Viking was the US Navy's anti-submarine jet and also provided surveillance of surface shipping.
- T-50 Golden Eagle : The T-50 is an advanced jet trainer produced by a partnership of Lockheed Martin and Korea Aerospace Industries (KAI). The two companies have formed the T-50 International Company for export marketing.
- Lockheed U-2 : The U-2 is a single-seat, single-engine, high-altitude reconnaissance airplane which first flew in 1955.
- Lockheed Martin VH-71 Kestrel
- Lockheed Martin X-33
- Lockheed Martin X-35
- Lockheed Martin X-44 MANTA
- Lockheed Martin X-55

== Gallery ==
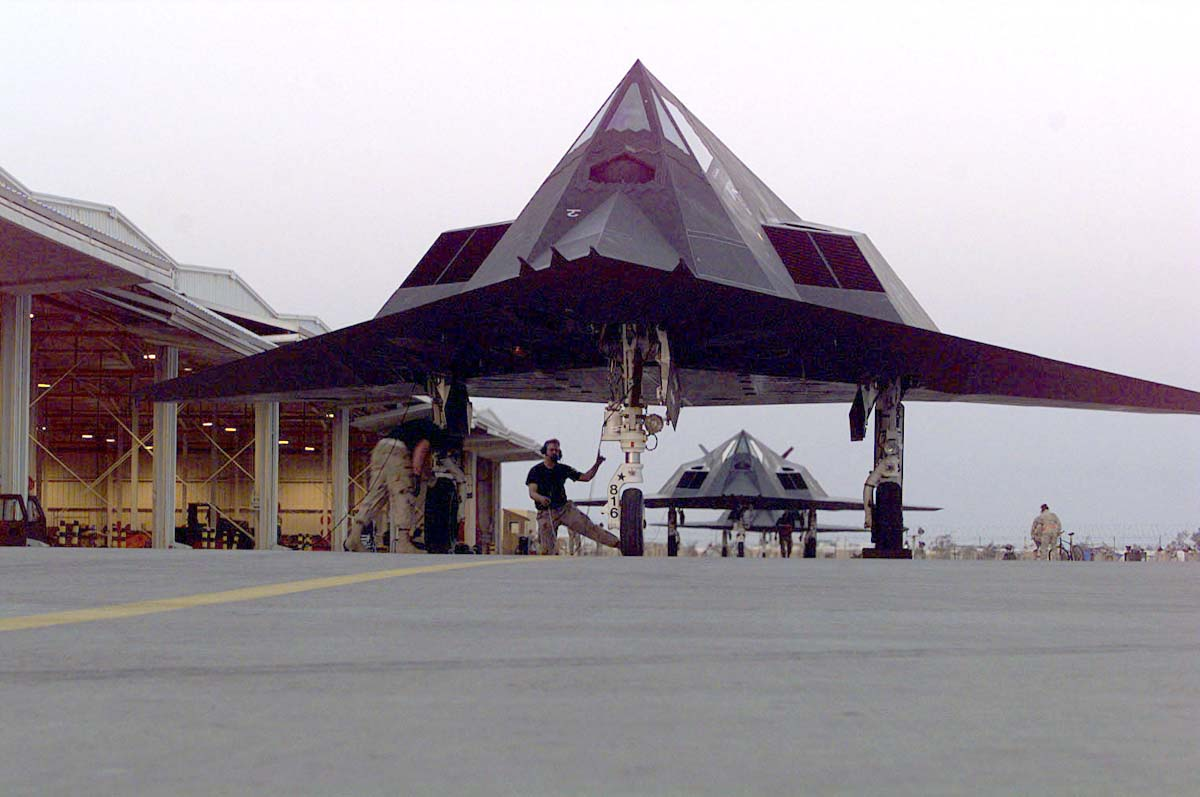
Lockheed F-117 stealth ground attack aircraft

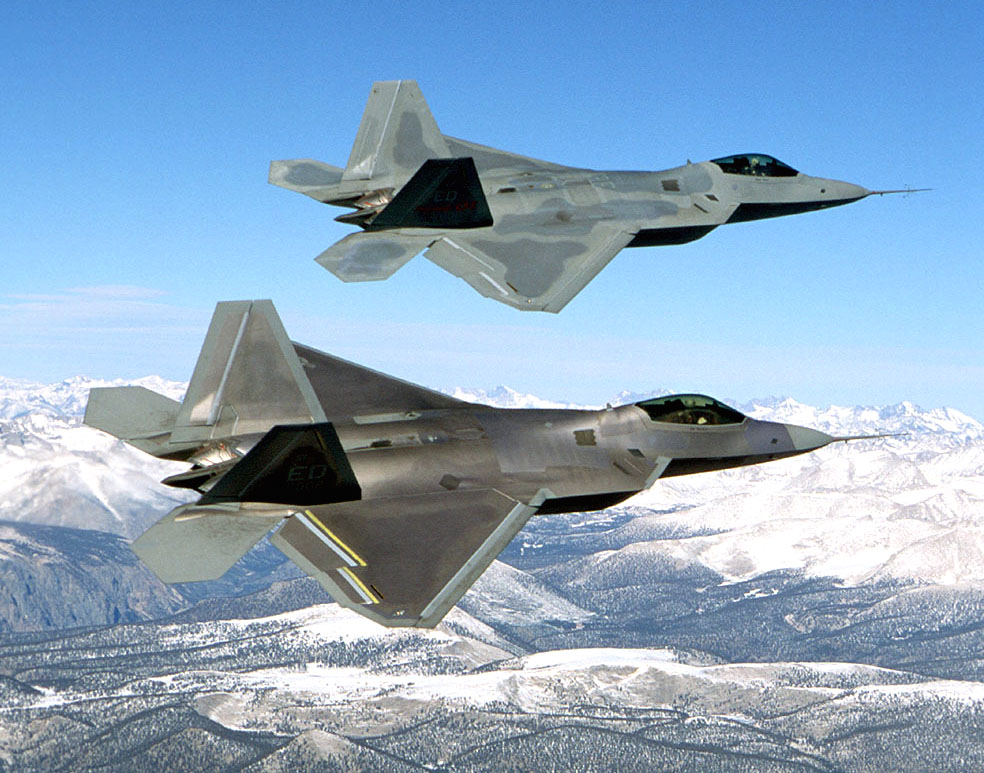
F-22 Raptor, stealth tactical fighter

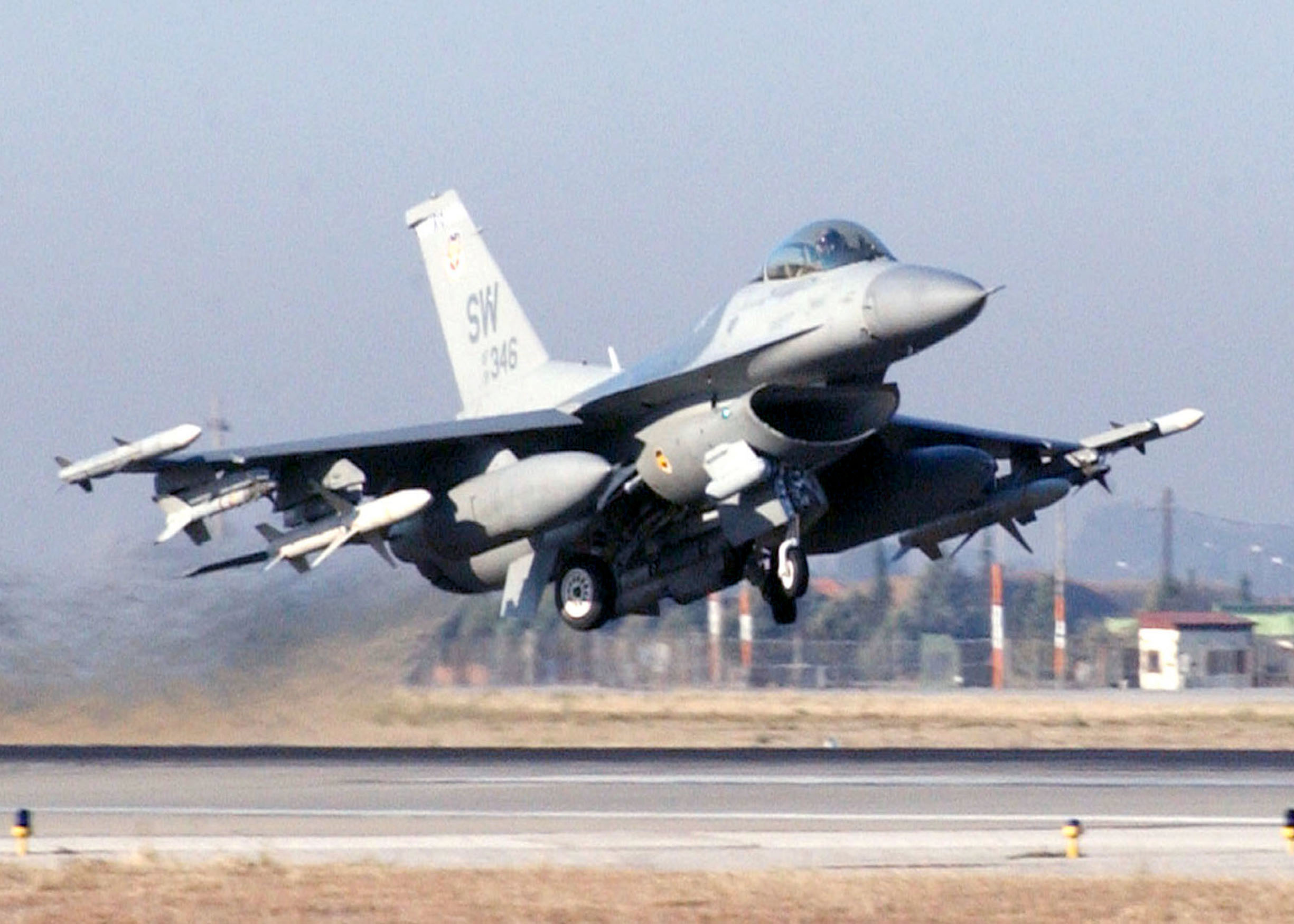
F-16 Fighting Falcon, initially developed by General Dynamics

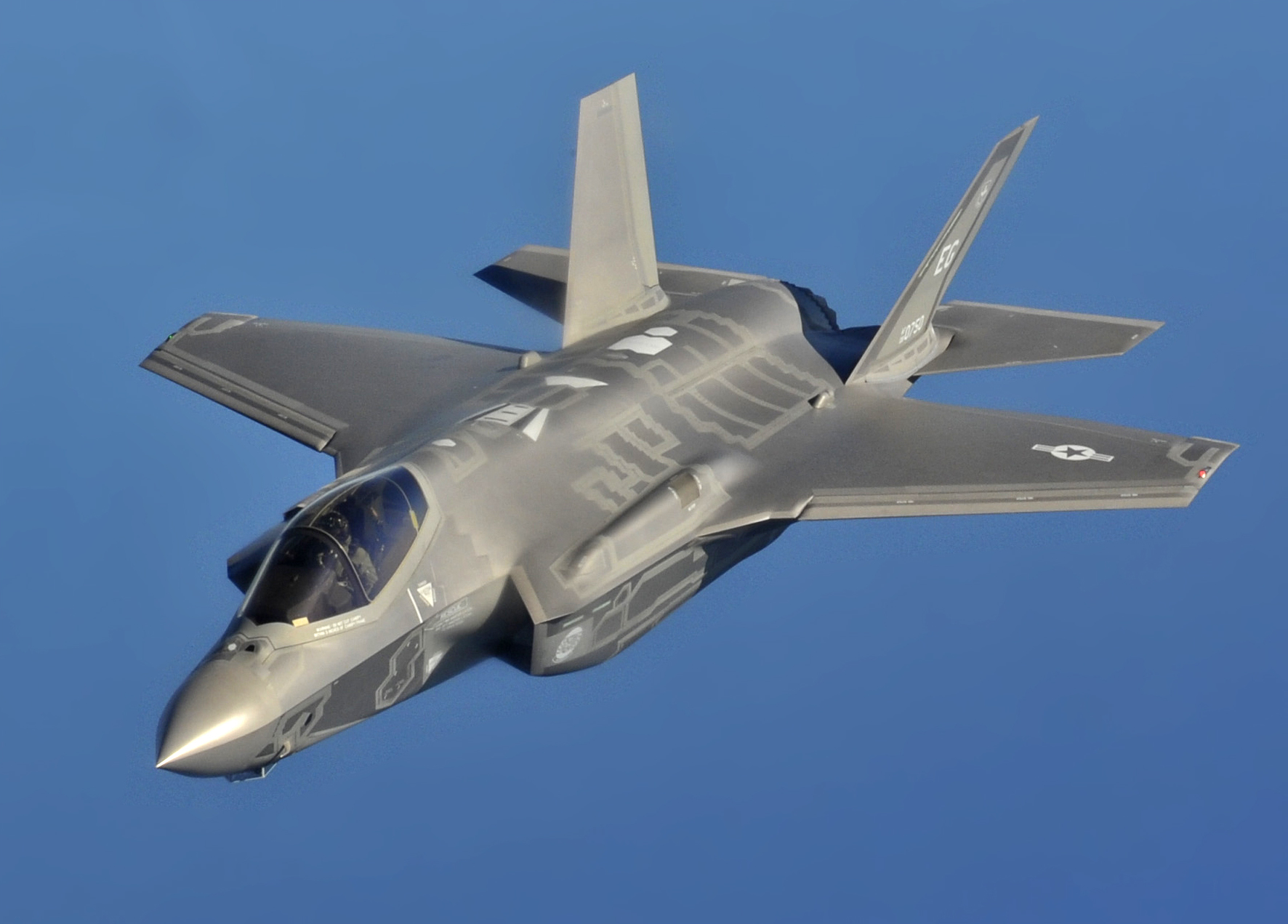
F-35 Lighting II, stealth tactical fighter

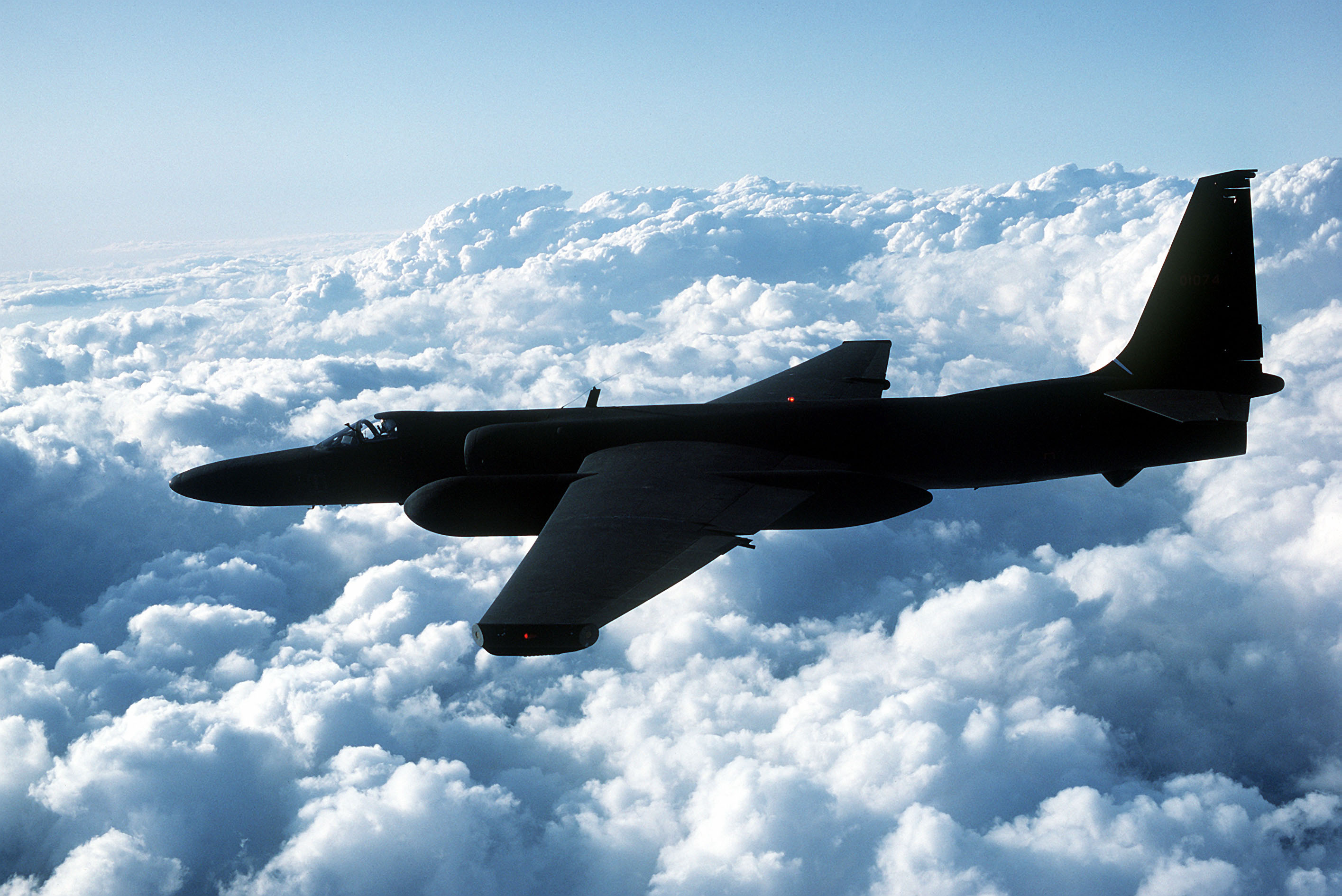
U-2 reconnaissance jet

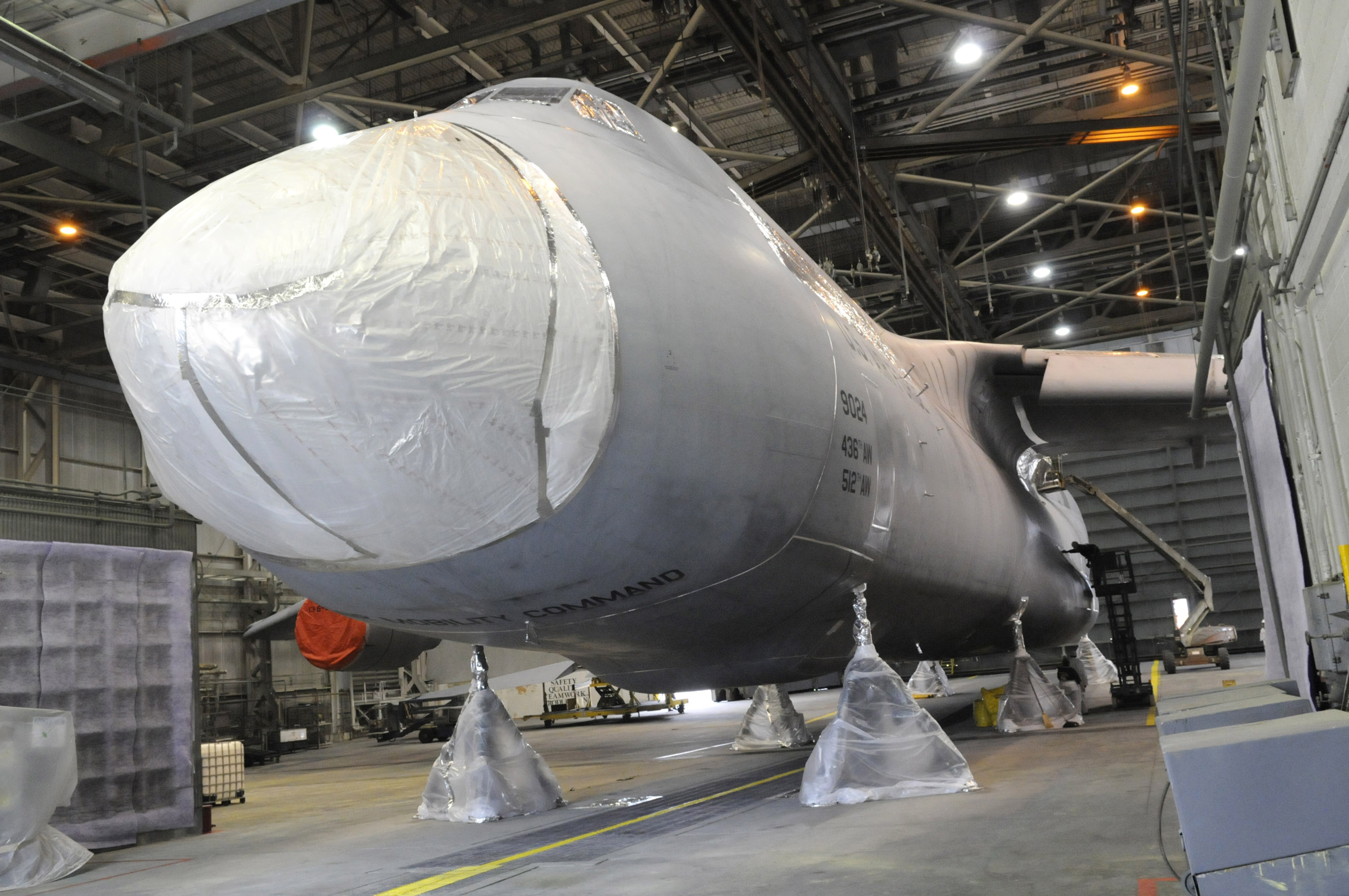
C-5 Galaxy undergoing upgrade to Super Galaxy

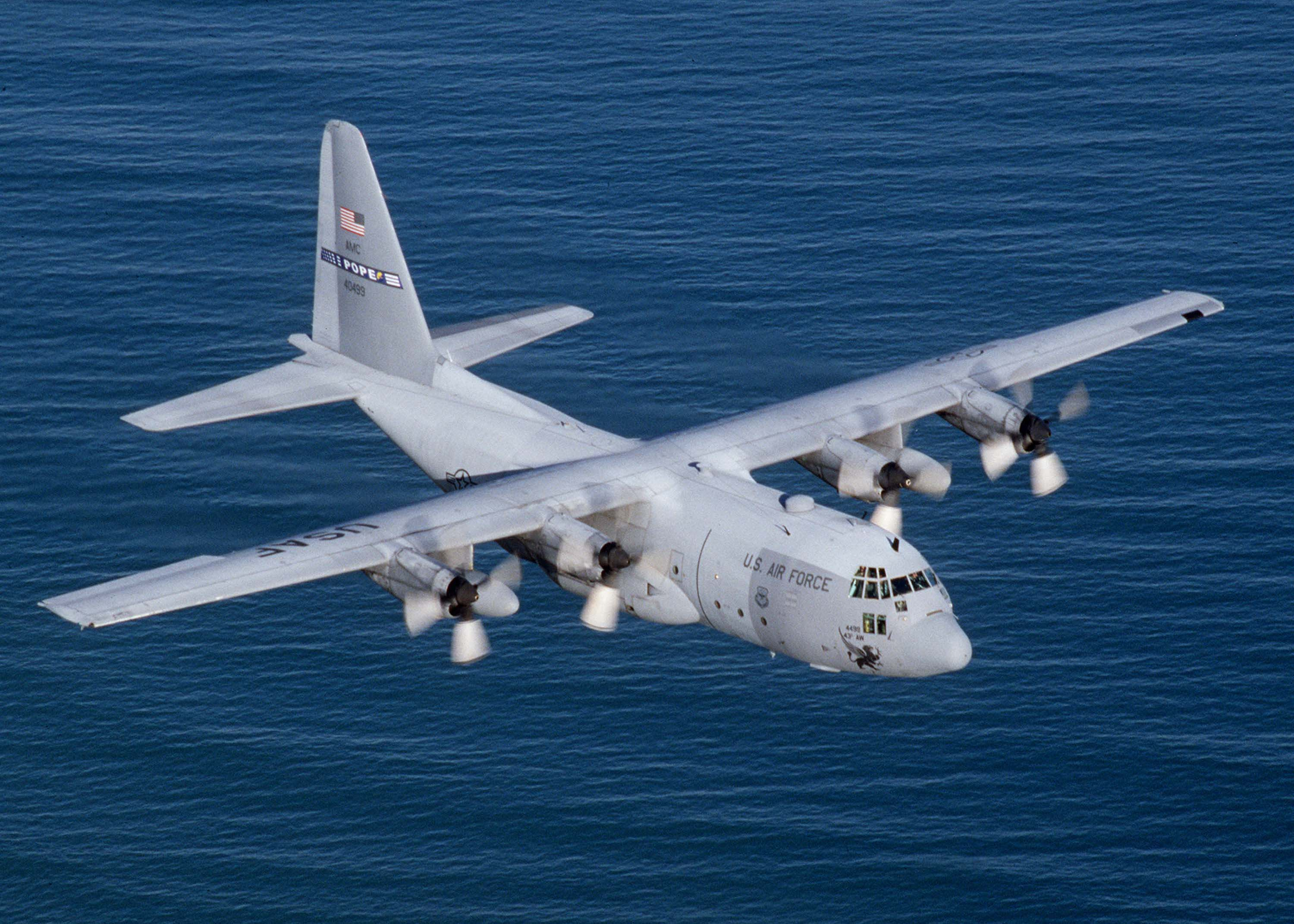
C-130 Hercules tactical transport

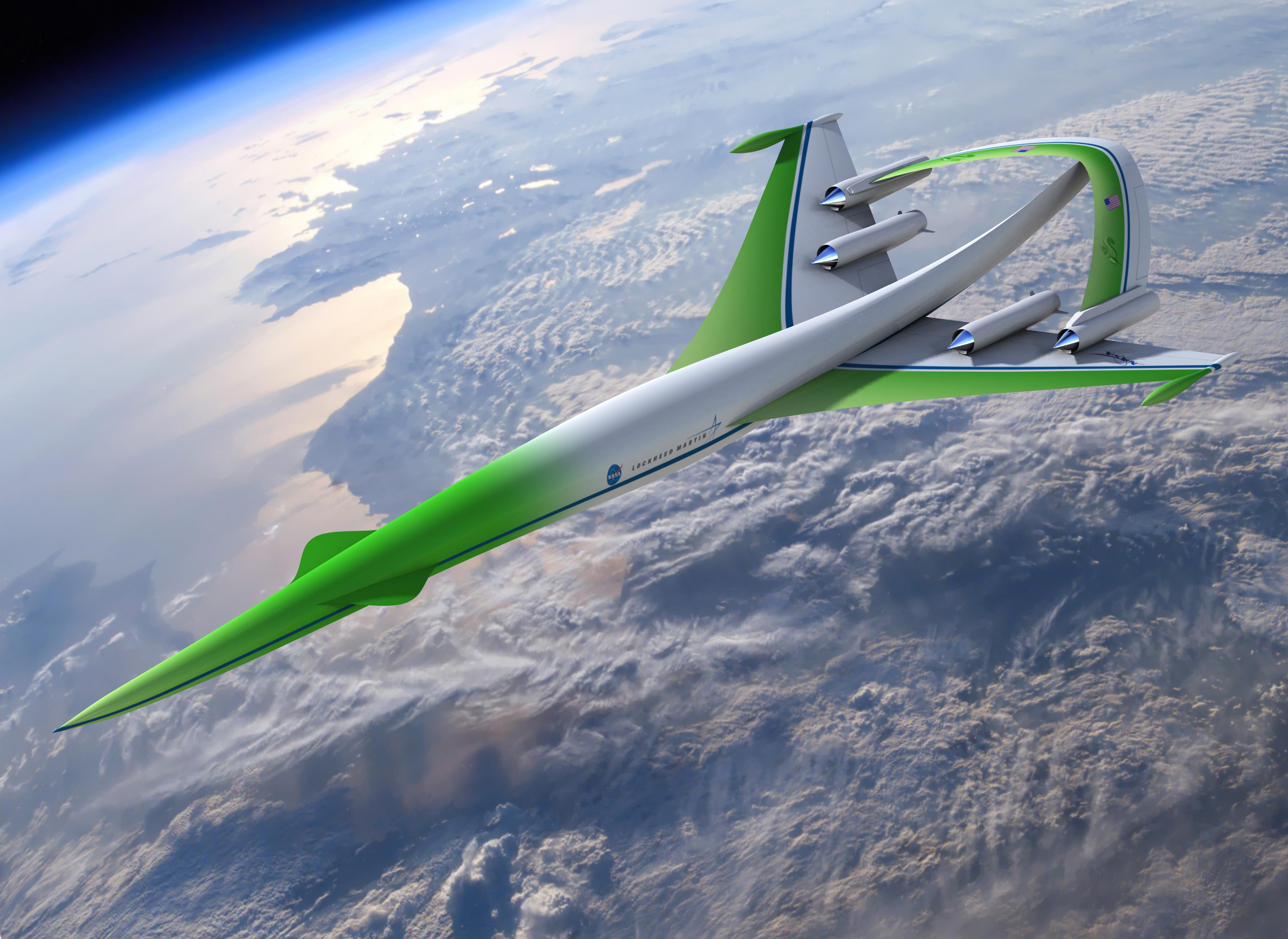
Future aircraft design concept for supersonic flight over land

== See also ==
- United States Military
- Military-Industrial Complex
- Sikorsky Aircraft
