= M26 Modular Accessory Shotgun System =

M26-MASS (Modular Accessory Shotgun System)
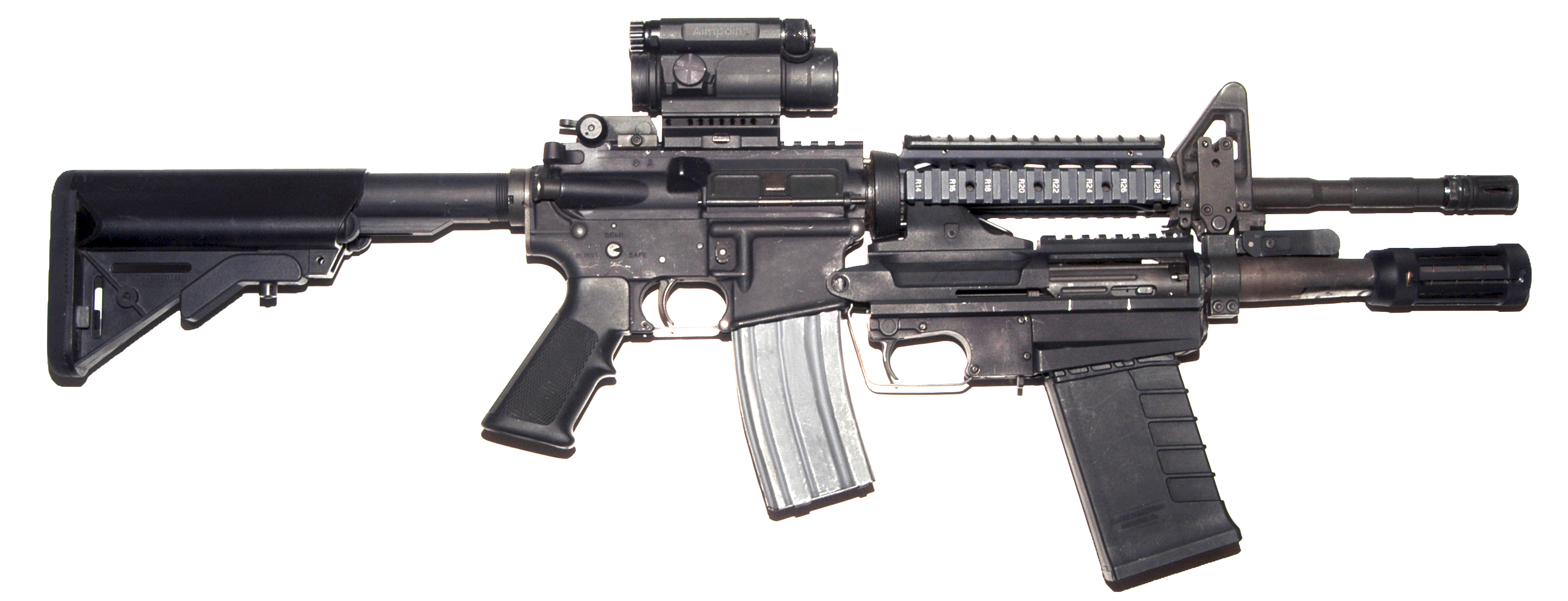
- The M26-MASS configured under the M4 carbine.
- Type: Underbarrel Shotgun
- Place of origin: United States

Service history
- In service: 2003–2011 (limited service); 2011–present (full service)
- Used by: United States; Ukraine
- Wars: Iraq War; War in Afghanistan (2001-2021); Russo-Ukrainian War

Production history
- Designer: Ira M. Kay
- Designed: 1997–2002
- Manufacturer: C-More Competition
- Produced: 2003–present
- No. built: 9,000+
- Variants: XM26

Specifications
- Mass: 3 lb (1.36 kg) underbarrel; 5 lb (2.27 kg) with collapsible stock; 3.5 lb (1.59 kg) with stock removed
- Length: 16.5 in (420 mm) underbarrel; 26.5 in (670 mm) stock extended / 24 in (610 mm) stock collapsed; 18 in (460 mm) stock removed
- Barrel length: 7.75 in (197 mm)
- Caliber: 12 gauge
- Action: Manually cycled straight-pull bolt action
- Feed system: 3 or 5-round detachable box magazine
- Sights: Underbarrel configuration: Zeroed for host rifle M16/M4 sights; Stand alone configuration: Flip up non-adjustable iron sights or MIL-STD-1913 rail attached optic

The M26-MASS (Modular Accessory Shotgun System) is a shotgun configured as an underbarrel ancillary weapon attachment mounted onto the handguard of a service rifle, usually the M16/M4 family of the United States Armed Forces, essentially making the host weapon a combination gun. It can also be operated as a stand-alone shotgun by attachment to a pistol grip/collapsible buttstock module. Rollout commenced in 2013, replacing the Mossberg 500 shotguns in service.

== Development ==
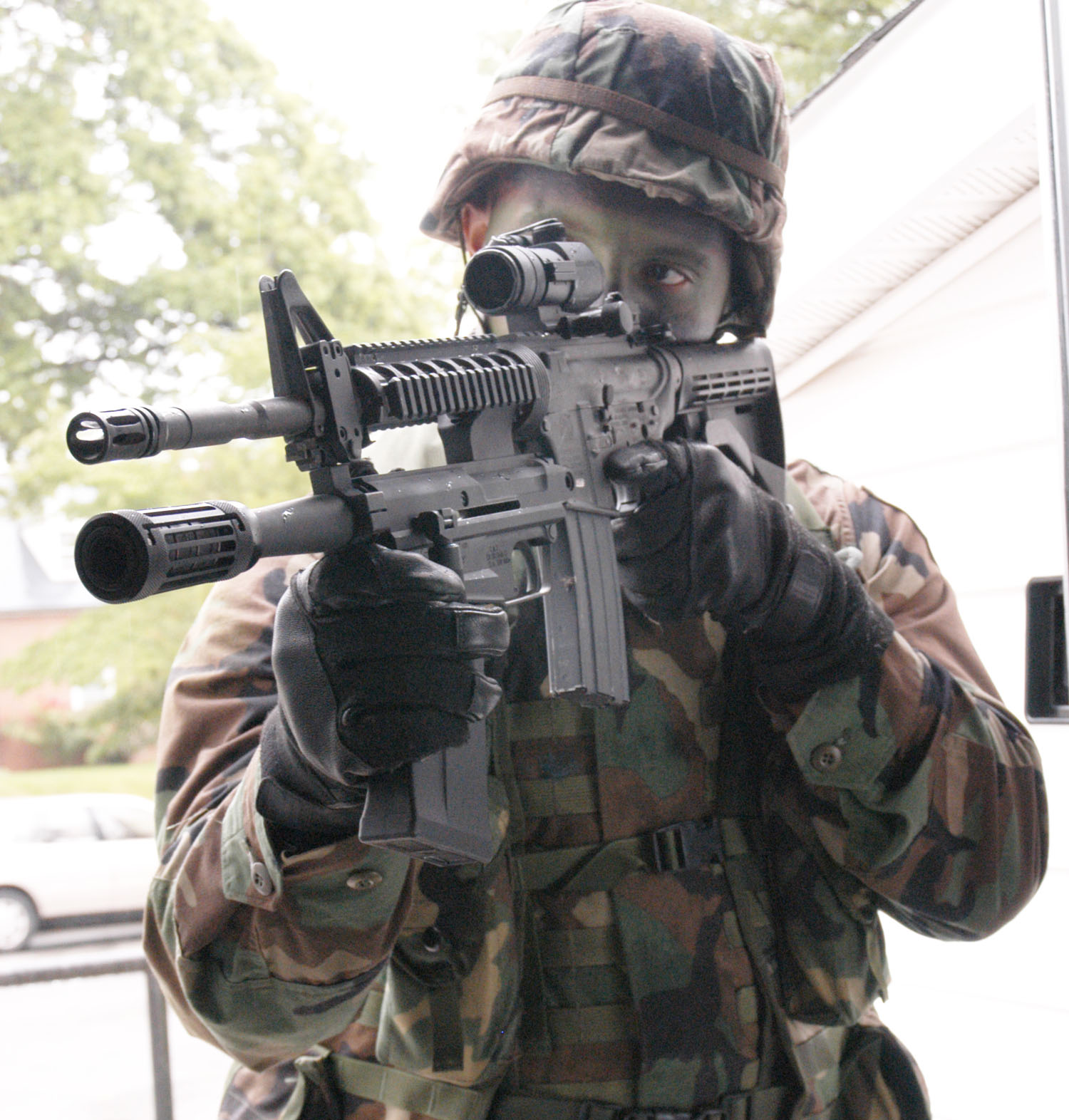
Soldier with M26-MASS mounted onto an M4 in underbarrel configuration. Note that this M26-MASS is missing the front sight folded over the barrel.

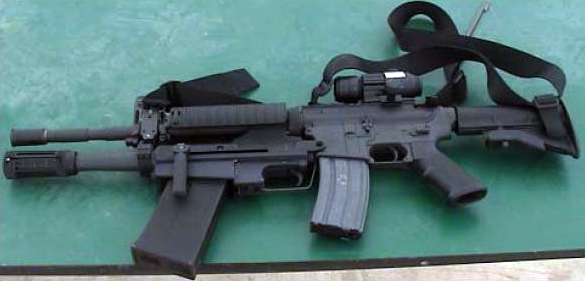
Left side of M26-MASS showing bolt handle.

The M26-MASS is a lightweight underbarrel shotgun configured to be secured to a main rifle, developed by C-More Systems and manufactured by Vertu Corporation and originally marketed toward special operations forces. It attracted the interest of soldiers being deployed to Afghanistan who wanted a lightweight system that could eliminate the need to carry additional weapons.

The M26-MASS had been in development at the U.S. Army's Soldier Battle Lab since the late 1990s. The idea was to provide soldiers with lightweight accessory weapons which could be mounted underbarrel of the standard issue M16 rifle or M4 carbine. These would provide soldiers with additional capabilities, such as: door breaching using special slugs, very short-range increased lethality using 00 buckshot, and less-lethal capabilities using teargas shells, rubber slugs, rubber pellets, or other non-lethal rounds.

The original idea was based on the Knight's Armament Company Masterkey system, which dates back to the 1980s and originally comprised a shortened, tube-fed Remington 870 shotgun mounted under an M16 rifle or M4 carbine. The M26-MASS improved upon the original Masterkey concept with a detachable magazine option and more comfortable handling, thanks to a bolt-operated system which is manually cycled for reloading and is characterized by a bolt which must be moved backward to remove a spent case and forward to chamber a new cartridge. The relatively large bolt handle is located closer to the rear rather than the slide on the Masterkey pump shotgun, and thus is easier to cycle in combat. The handle can be easily attached on either side of the bolt. The detachable magazine offers quicker reloading and change of ammunition types.

The M26-MASS was chosen by the U.S. Military over the Masterkey as a breaching tool. Small numbers of M26-MASS shotguns were issued to U.S. troops in Afghanistan. The current contract calls for the delivery of 9,000 shotguns. In February 2012, the first unit was fully equipped with M26-MASS. At the same time the Army also has been replacing the M500 with the M26 in its own inventory.

=== War on Terror ===
In May 2008, the Army announced it would procure 35,000 units. The first M26-MASS shotguns were procured and fielded to military police and engineer units in 2010. However, some units in both Iraq and Afghanistan were issued the M26-MASS in small quantities as early as 2003. Full initial fielding began in 2011.

== Specifications ==
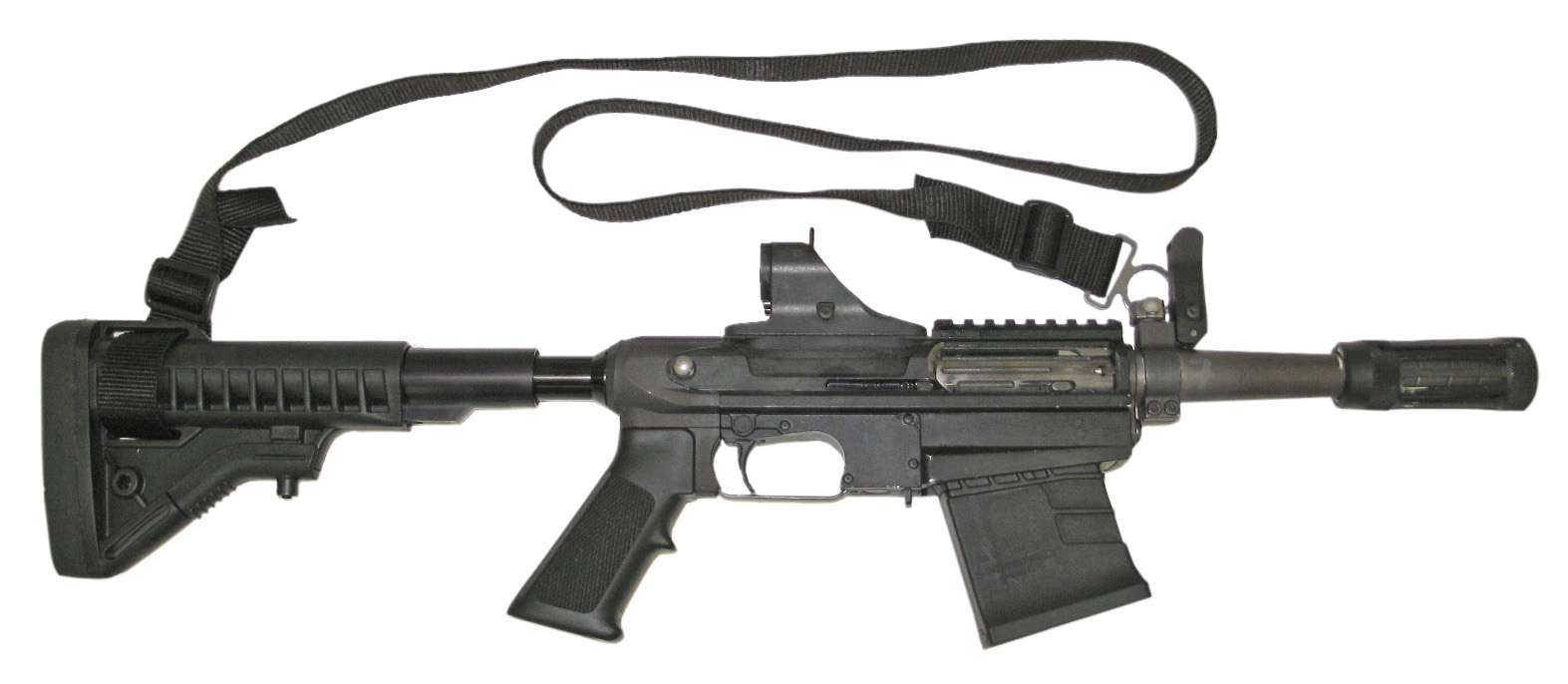
M26-MASS Stand-alone configuration. Note that the flip-up rear sight is protected by the clamp used to mount the weapon to a rifle's barrel

- Caliber: 12 gauge
- Operation: Manual Straight pull bolt-action.
- Capacity: 3 or 5 round detachable box magazine.
- Ammunition: 2.75 (70mm) and 3 in (76mm) lethal, non-lethal and breaching rounds.
- Barrel length: 7.75 in (197 mm) with integral breaching stand-off adapter.
- Under-barrel configuration:
  - Overall length: 16.5 in (419 mm)
  - Weight: 2 lb 11 oz (1.22 kg)
- Stand-alone configuration:
  - Overall length: 24 in (610 mm) (stock collapsed)
  - Weight: 4 lb 3 oz (1.90 kg)

== See also ==
- Combat shotgun
- KAC Masterkey
- List of individual weapons of the U.S. Armed Forces (Shotguns)
- M203 grenade launcher
- M320 Grenade Launcher Module
- MAUL (shotgun)
- Saiga-12
