= Knight's Armament Company Masterkey =

Masterkey
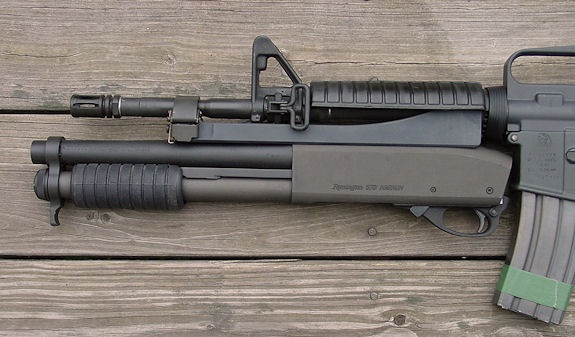
- Masterkey shotgun mounted on an M16A2 Carbine (Colt Model 727)
- Type: Shotgun
- Place of origin: United States

Specifications
- Mass: 2.6 kg (5.7 lb)
- Length: 43.2 cm (17.0 in)
- Barrel length: 25.4 cm (10.0 in)
- Cartridge: 12 gauge
- Action: Pump action
- Effective firing range: 50 m (160 ft)
- Feed system: 3+1 rounds, internal tubular magazine

The Masterkey is a door breaching shotgun system manufactured by Knight's Armament Company.

The Masterkey project was initiated during the 1980s to provide assault rifles with a potent built-in door breaching tool. Individual soldiers were often forced to carry a separate breaching shotgun in addition to their standard-issue rifle, but the Masterkey removes this need by combining the two firearms. The system consists of a shortened and heavily modified Remington 870 12 gauge pump-action intended to be mounted under a firearm's barrel, similarly to the M203 grenade launcher. It has a 3-round internal tubular magazine and can carry an additional round in the chamber, for a total of 4 rounds.

When firing the Masterkey mounted on a rifle as designed, the rifle's magazine is generally used as a makeshift pistol grip. While the shotgun can be operated independently from a host firearm, doing so is quite awkward as there is no provision for attachment of a pistol grip or stock. KAC does produce an independent mount/stock assembly for the M203 grenade launcher, however, that is fully compatible with the Masterkey.

The availability of these arms from KAC has been limited and as such, pricing on the civilian collectors market has increased drastically since their introduction. Because of the high prices and overall scarcity, a small company called Allegheny Gun Works produced a limited number of near exact clones of the KAC product in 2024 marketed as the KTMS-12. While nearly identical to the original, AGW also offered an optional mounting stud that allows standalone use with a standard 870 compatible stock or pistol grip even with the rifle mount in place.

The Masterkey concept has inspired several other firearms such as the under barrel mount option for the Remington MCS and the M26 Modular Accessory Shotgun System, an attachable shotgun currently in use with the United States Army as their rifle mounted breaching tool of choice.

The weapon's name "Masterkey" references its obvious ability to open virtually any standard lock.

== Users ==
- United States: Delta Force

== See also ==
- Ciener Ultimate Over/Under
- Combat shotgun
- M26 MASS
