= Uniforms of the Australian Army =

The uniforms of the Australian Army have changed significantly over the past century, although the accoutrements worn over this period have remained relatively similar. The forces of the Australian colonies and the early forces of the Commonwealth post-Federation in 1901 closely followed the uniforms of the British Army. Since then it has continued to be influenced by British but also US styles, as well as including some distinctly Australian designs, reflecting local conditions and trends.

== Overview ==
Many of the Australian Army's customs and traditions have been inherited from the British Army, due to the nation's history as a former British colony and the Army's origins in the forces raised by each of the Australian colonies. While soldiers originally only wore a single uniform for all occasions—including ceremonial parades, work parties or in the field—later they were issued with two types of uniform, one for day-to-day working and fighting in, known as "service" or "battle-dress", and another for parades and ceremony, or "full-dress" uniform. Military uniforms have undergone gradual, yet almost constant, change since the 19th century, moving away from bright colours to more drab camouflage designs. This has occurred mostly for tactical reasons, in response to developments in weapons and operational methods, as well as reflecting changes in the area in which military forces have been required to operate, and the prevailing environment, terrain and vegetation. Other influences have included specific national characteristics, military tradition and alliances, as well as civilian fashion trends. Australian Army uniforms have mostly tended to be functional with only limited accoutrements, even to the point of being described as "bland", a trend which has been ascribed in part to a traditional mistrust of authority in Australian society. Yet despite changes, even in the early 21st century the uniforms and accoutrements worn remain similar to those adopted or modified from those of the British Army.

== History ==
=== Colonial forces ===
Prior to Federation each of the Australian colonies had maintained their own military forces made up pre-dominantly of volunteers or militia, and the uniforms they adopted generally followed colour and design of the part-time British territorial forces, being mostly green and grey as opposed to the red of the British regular forces, although this was worn by some units. Ranks also followed the British pattern. A number of "Scottish" corps were raised in the colonies, many of which wore highland dress, while there were also several "Irish' units which wore green, and several local "English" regiments which continued to wear red. Members of the New South Wales Contingent sent to Sudan in 1885 initially wore red for infantry and blue for artillery, along with white sun helmet and equipment; however, on arrival their uniforms were replaced by khaki. Meanwhile, in the 1890s the uniforms worn in the Australian colonies began to reflect local trends, becoming more suited to the conditions. These were mostly a drab khaki with coloured regimental facings, worn with a wide-brimmed hat, while regimental badges often included uniquely Australian flora or fauna or other national symbols. The wide-brimmed slouch hat was first worn during this time. Initially worn by the Victorian Mounted Rifles in 1885, it was adopted by the New South Wales Reserve Rifle Companies soon after and by some infantry regiments which wore it "for shooting purposes". Considered sensible and practical for local conditions its popularity grew and its use became widespread. While Victorian and Tasmanian units initially wore the brim turned up on the right after Federation all units adopted the practice of doing so on the left. Forces of the Australian colonies deployed to South Africa during the Second Anglo-Boer War wore khaki uniforms—issued due to the increased range and accuracy of small arms—instead of their more colourful regimental dress.

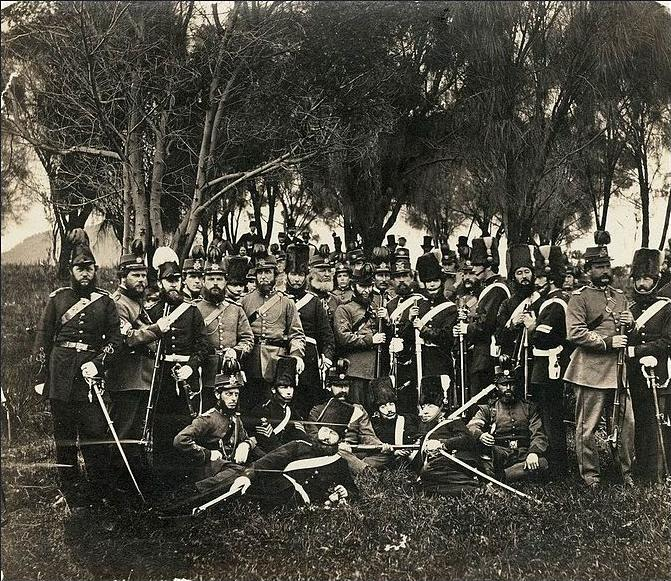
South Australian Volunteer Forces in 1860.

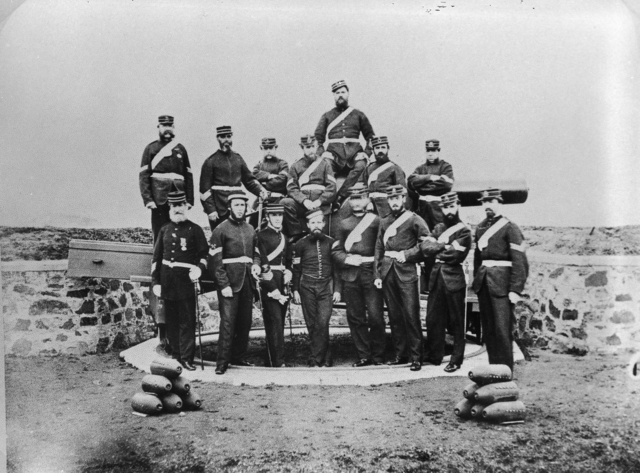
Members of the Hobart Town Volunteer Artillery in August 1869

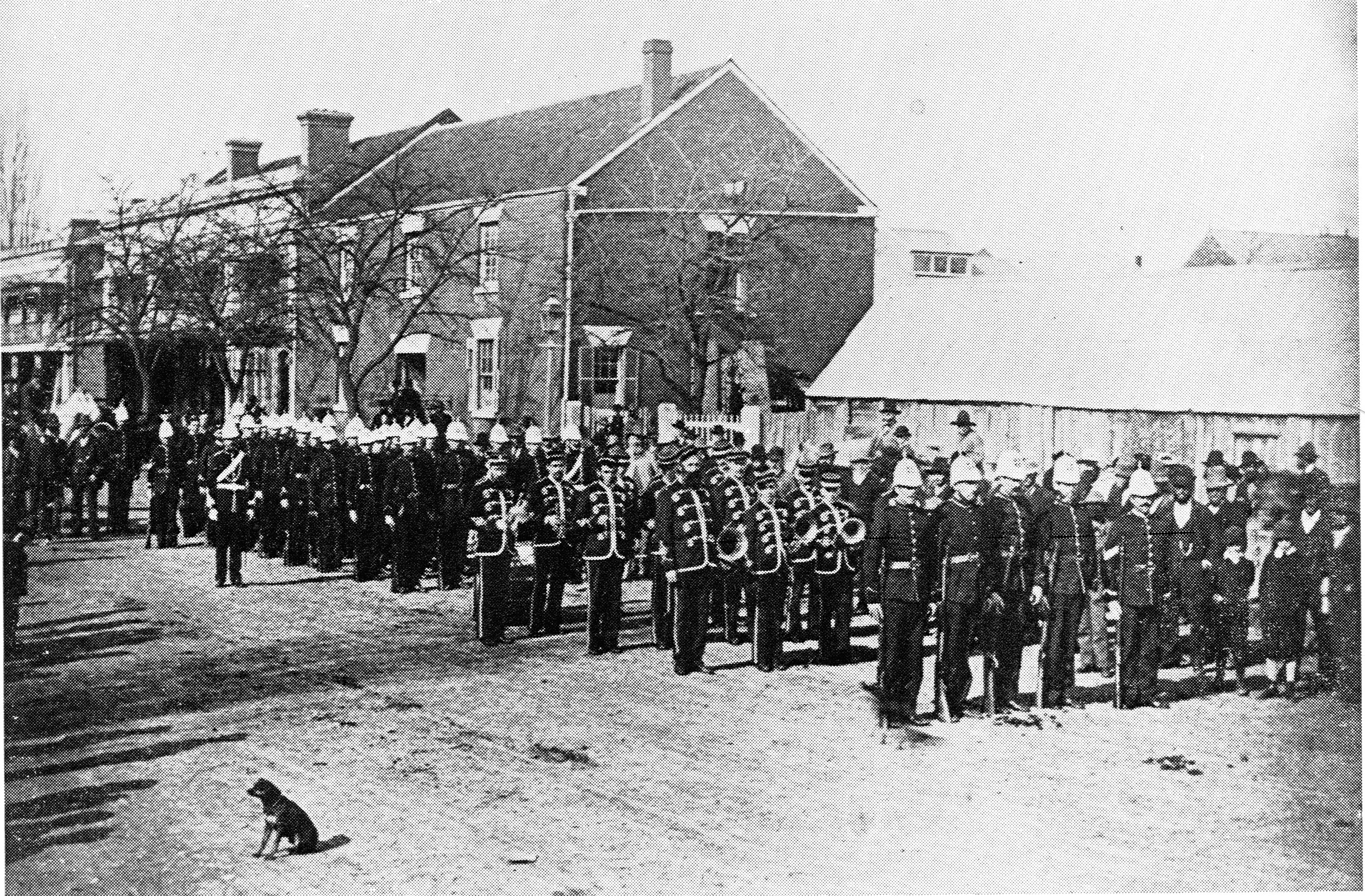
Parade of militia units in Wagga Wagga, c. 1880

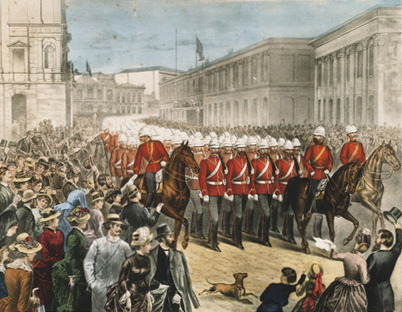
Departure of the NSW Contingent, 1885.

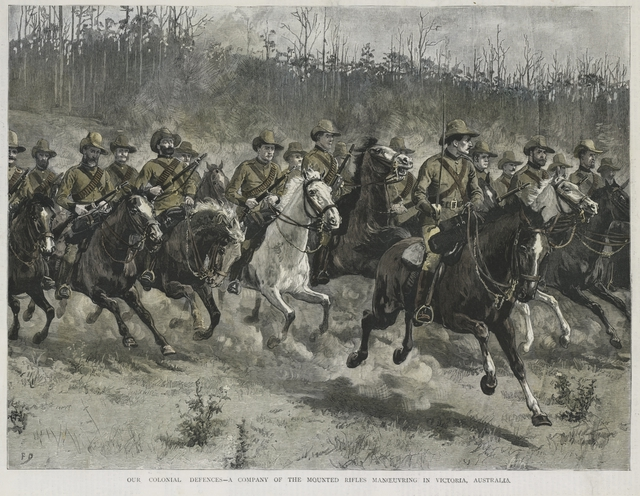
A company of the Victorian Mounted Rifles on manoeuvres in 1889.

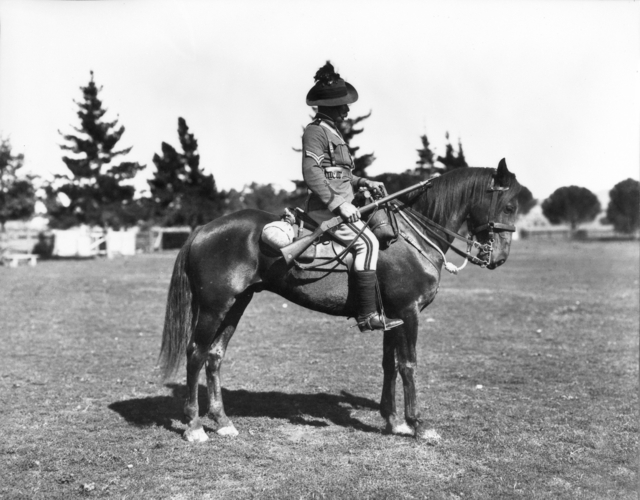
A trooper of the New South Wales Mounted Rifles, c. 1900.

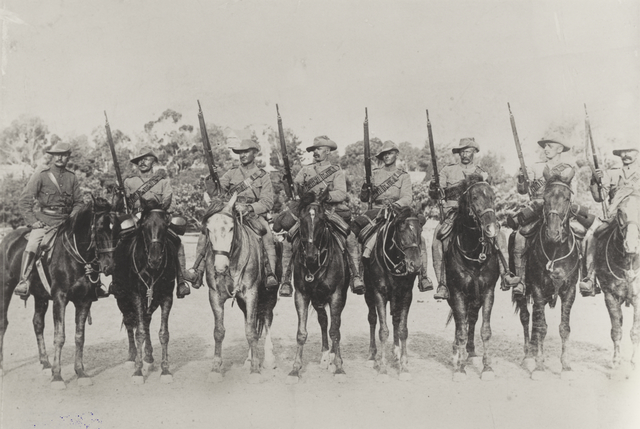
South Australian Mounted Rifles training near Adelaide prior to deploying to South Africa, c. 1900.

=== Post-Federation ===
On 1 March 1901 the Australian Army was formed following the transfer of colonial forces. Universal service dress was introduced in 1902 and was worn at all times, including in the field, except for formal occasions requiring full dress. This uniform included a peaked cap, tunic, and trousers, with officers wearing a Sam Browne belt. Officers of the mounted arm wore breeches and boots, while the rest wore puttees. The different arms and corps were distinguished by the colour of the braid trimming on the shoulder straps. A wide-brimmed slouch hat was worn with one side turned up by troops overseas. The rising sun badge was first worn at this time by battalions of the Australian Commonwealth Horse on active service in South Africa, while some Queensland units wore emu plumes in their hats. During this period it remained common to follow the British system, with the uniform subsequently adopted by the Commonwealth consisting of a General Service Dress which, in order to achieve financial savings, could be converted into Full Dress for ceremonial occasions simply by the addition of a number of lace accoutrements, including aiguillettes, as well as breast-lines and girdles. The uniform consisted of a khaki serge jacket, with slouch hat and breeches. Cloth collar patches were worn, as well as coloured piping on the jacket, with rosettes or plumes on the hat, and regimental badges. The introduction of universal service in 1912 resulted in the adoption of a number of changes due to the need to economise following the rapid expansion of the Army. The uniform provide for at this time was relatively simple, consisting of a hat, heavy woollen khaki shirt, cord breeches and boots. To distinguish between units and corps a coloured cloth hat band with a metal numeral was worn. Officers kept their jackets, and later approval was given to wear open collars with shirt and tie.

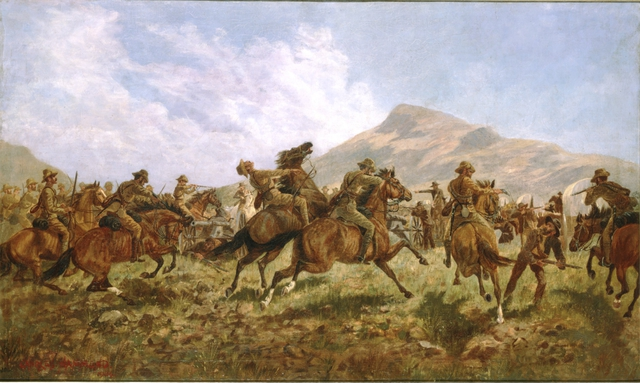
Australians and New Zealanders at Klerksdorp on 24 March 1901.

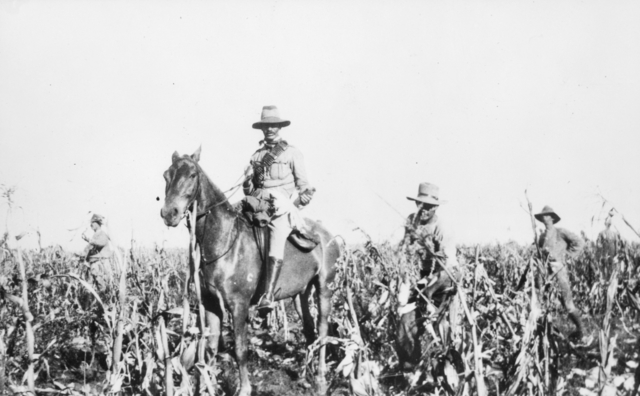
Troops of 1st Battalion, Australian Commonwealth Horse in the Transvaal, 1902.

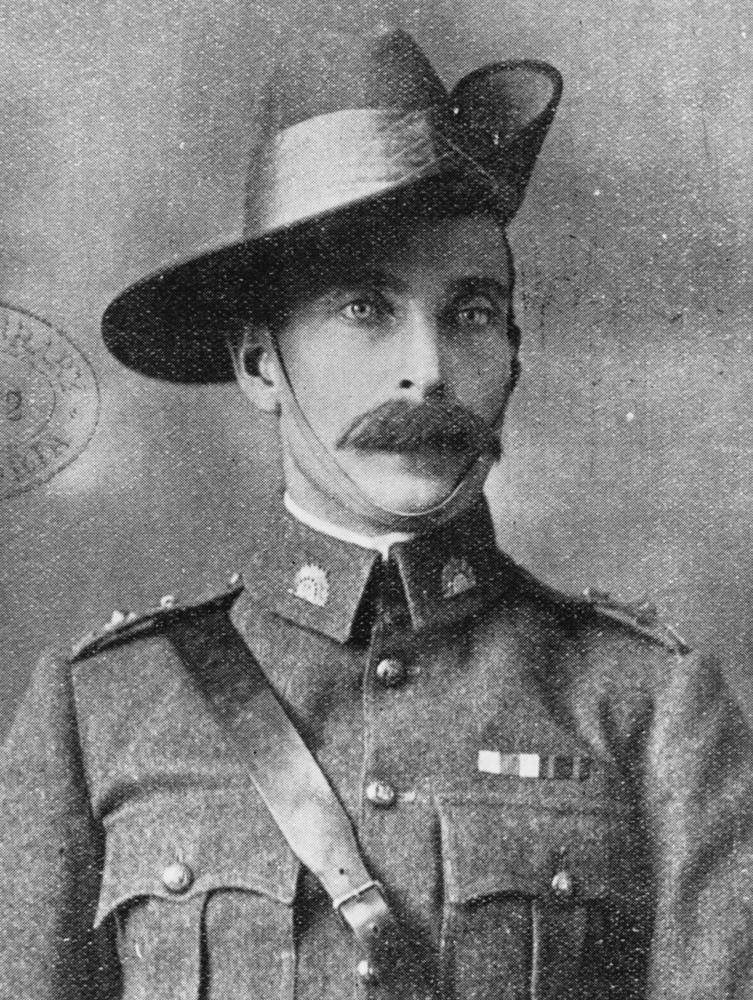
Lieutenant Colonel Harry Chauvel wearing a Sam Brown belt, rising sun badges on his collars, and a slouch hat, turned up on the left side, 1902.

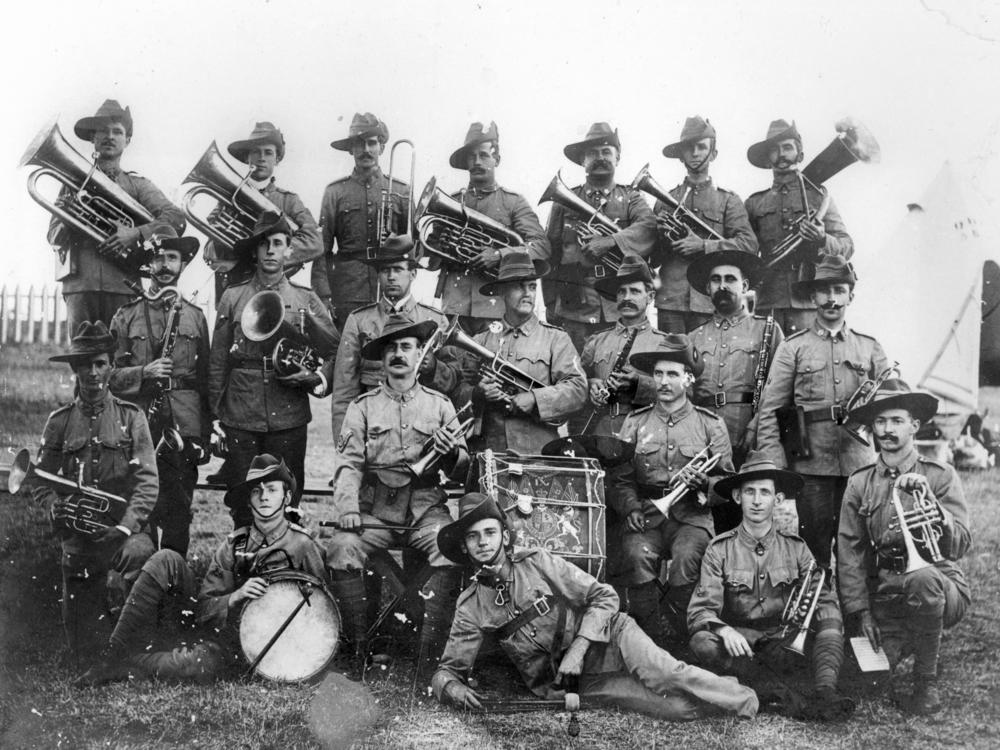
Headquarters Band, attached to the 9th Regiment, in 1909.

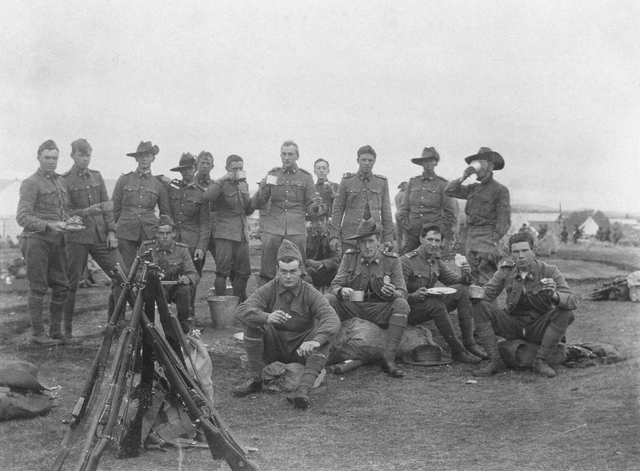
Members of the militia, probably from either the 16th or 41st Batteries, Australian Field Artillery, in Tasmania, c. 1913.

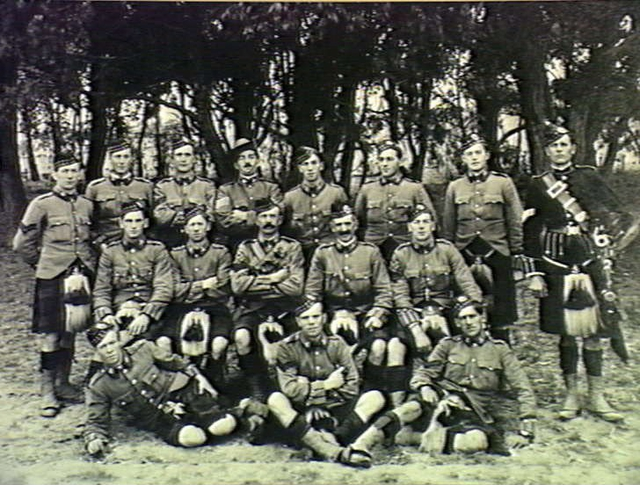
Members of the 52nd Australian Infantry Battalion (Victorian Scottish Regiment) in Melbourne, c. 1914.

=== Great War and interbellum ===
The pre-war Australian Army uniform formed the basis of that worn by the First Australian Imperial Force (1st AIF), which adopted the broad-brimmed slouch hat and rising sun badge. Peak caps were initially also worn by the infantry, while light horsemen often wore a distinctive emu plume in their slouch hats. A standard khaki puggaree was worn by all arms. From 1916 the British steel Brodie helmet was issued for use by infantry on the Western Front. A loose-fitting four-pocket service dress jacket was worn, along with baggy knee breeches, puttees, and tan ankle-boots. A heavy woollen greatcoat was worn during cold weather. The uniform was a drab "pea soup" or khaki colour, while all buttons and badges were oxidised to prevent shine. All personnel wore a shoulder title bearing the word "Australia". Rank insignia followed the British Army pattern and were worn on the upper arms (or shoulders for officers). Identical hat and collar badges were worn by all units, which were initially only distinguished by small metal numerals and letters on the shoulder straps (or collars for officers). However, in 1915 a system of Unit Colour Patches was adopted, worn on the upper arm of a soldier's jacket. Uniforms worn by the Australian Flying Corps (AFC) were similar to those of the rest of the AIF, although some officers wore a double-breasted "maternity jacket". AFC "wings" were worn on the left breast, while an AFC colour patch and standard rising sun badges were also worn.

The AIF-pattern uniform was mostly maintained by the Australian Army in the years following the war. However, in the 1930s a range of new uniforms, believed to be more "attractive", were issued to the Militia in an attempt to increase recruitment. Mostly these were blue or khaki, and included "distinctive" coloured collars and piping which indicated corps. Meanwhile, it was decided to retain unit-colour patches, whilst regimental and corps badges were also adopted at this time. The uniforms of the various local "Scottish" units were considered to be particularly colourful.

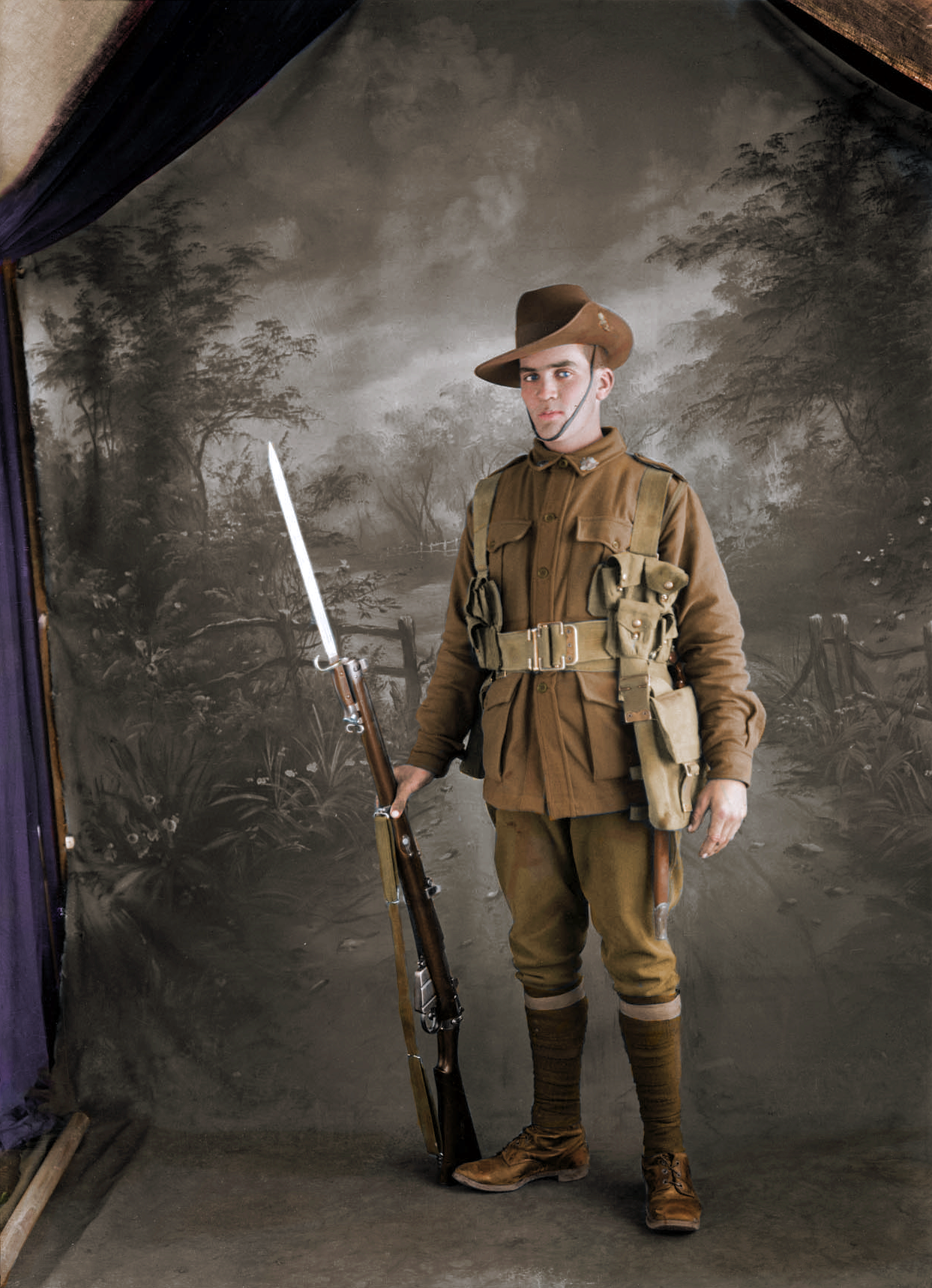
An Australian private before departure, 1915 (colorized)

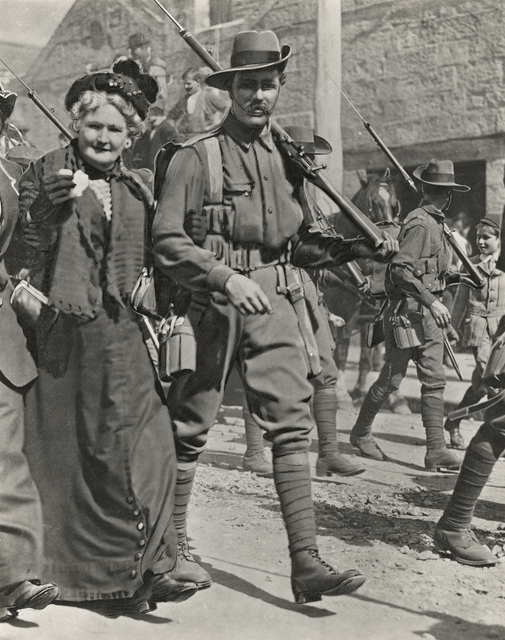
An Australian soldier of the AN&MEF and in Sydney, 1914, prior to departing for Rabaul.

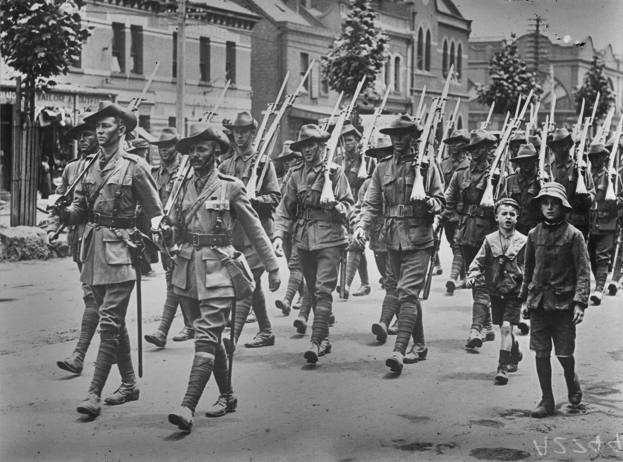
Troops from 'A' Company, 15th Battalion march through Melbourne on 17 December 1914.

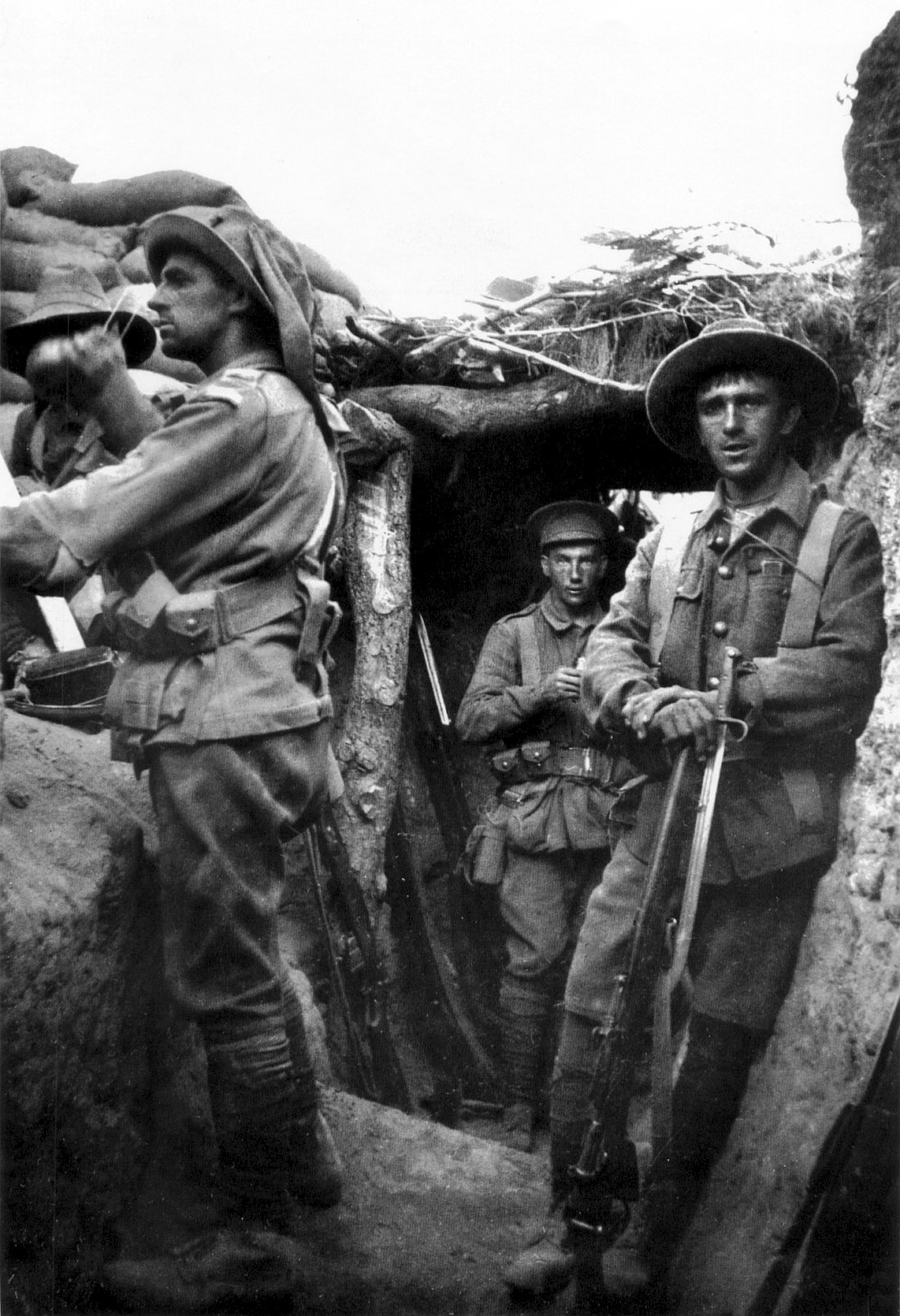
Members of the 7th Battalion in a trench at Lone Pine, 6 August 1915.

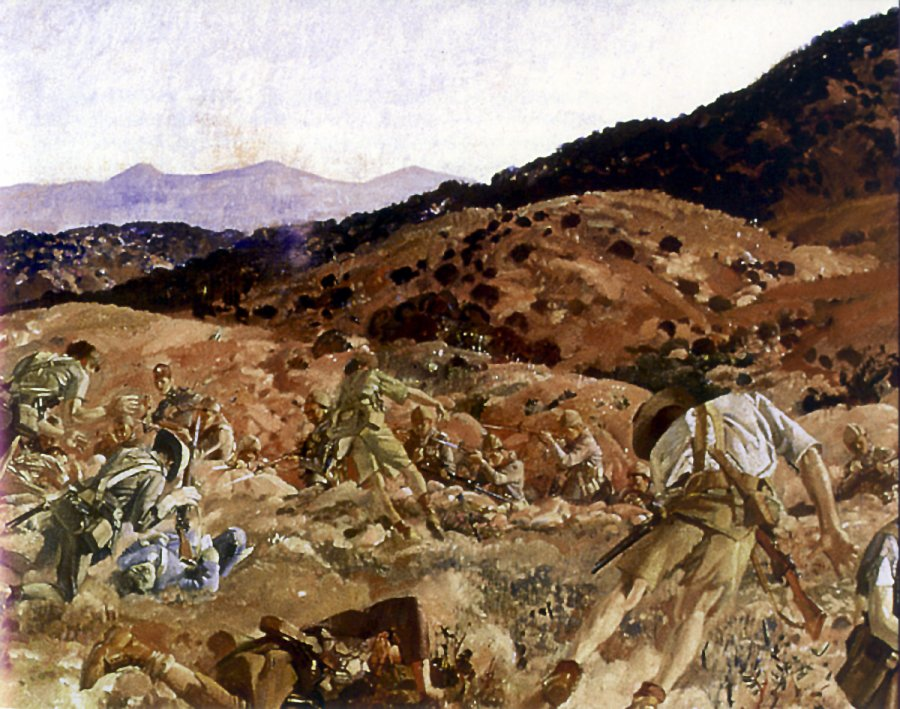
The Charge of the 3rd Light Horse Brigade at the Nek, 7 August 1915 by George Lambert.

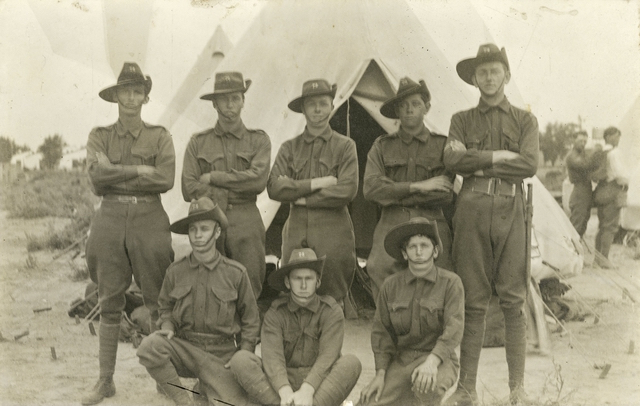
Men from the 74th (Boothby) Regiment during a training camp, c. 1915.

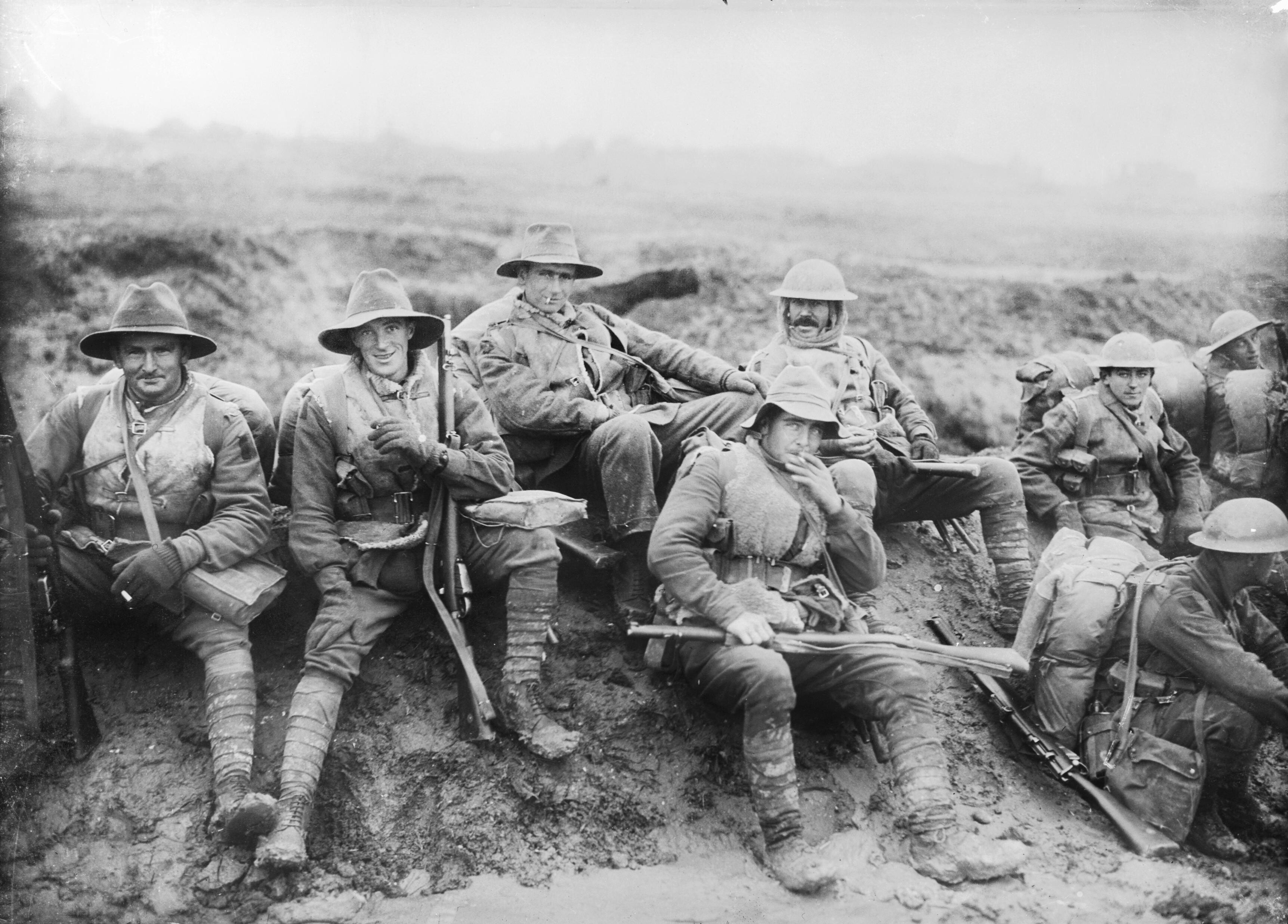
Members of the Australian 5th Division in France, December 1916.

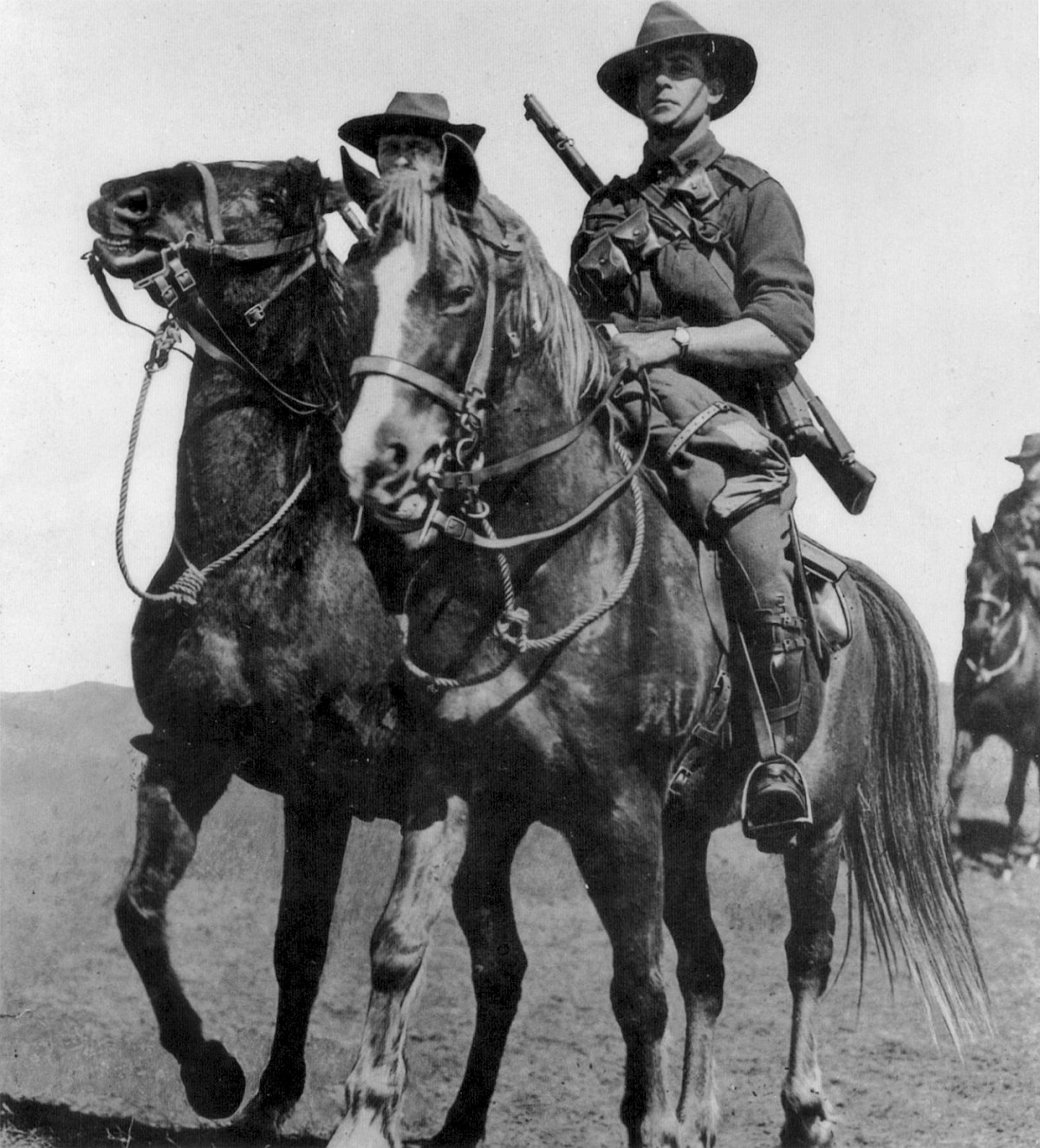
Australian light horsemen on Walers prior to their departure from Australia.

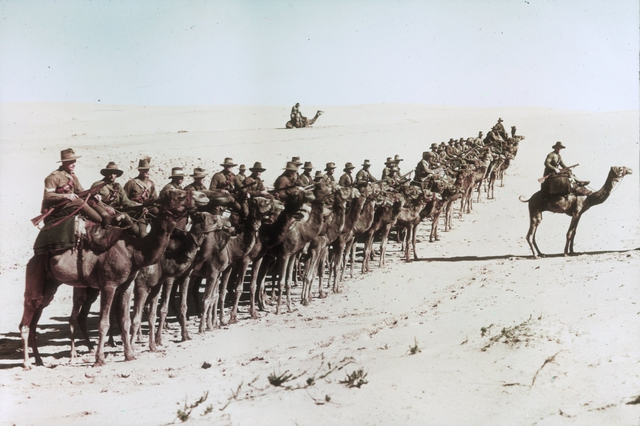
Australian camel company, January 1918.

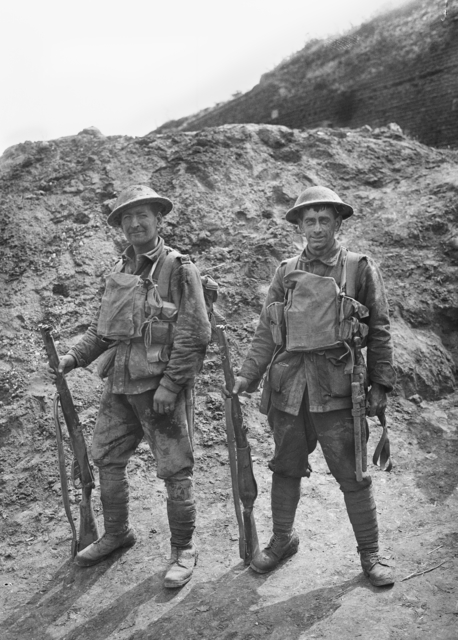
Two soldiers from the 5th Division in field uniform, France, July 1918.

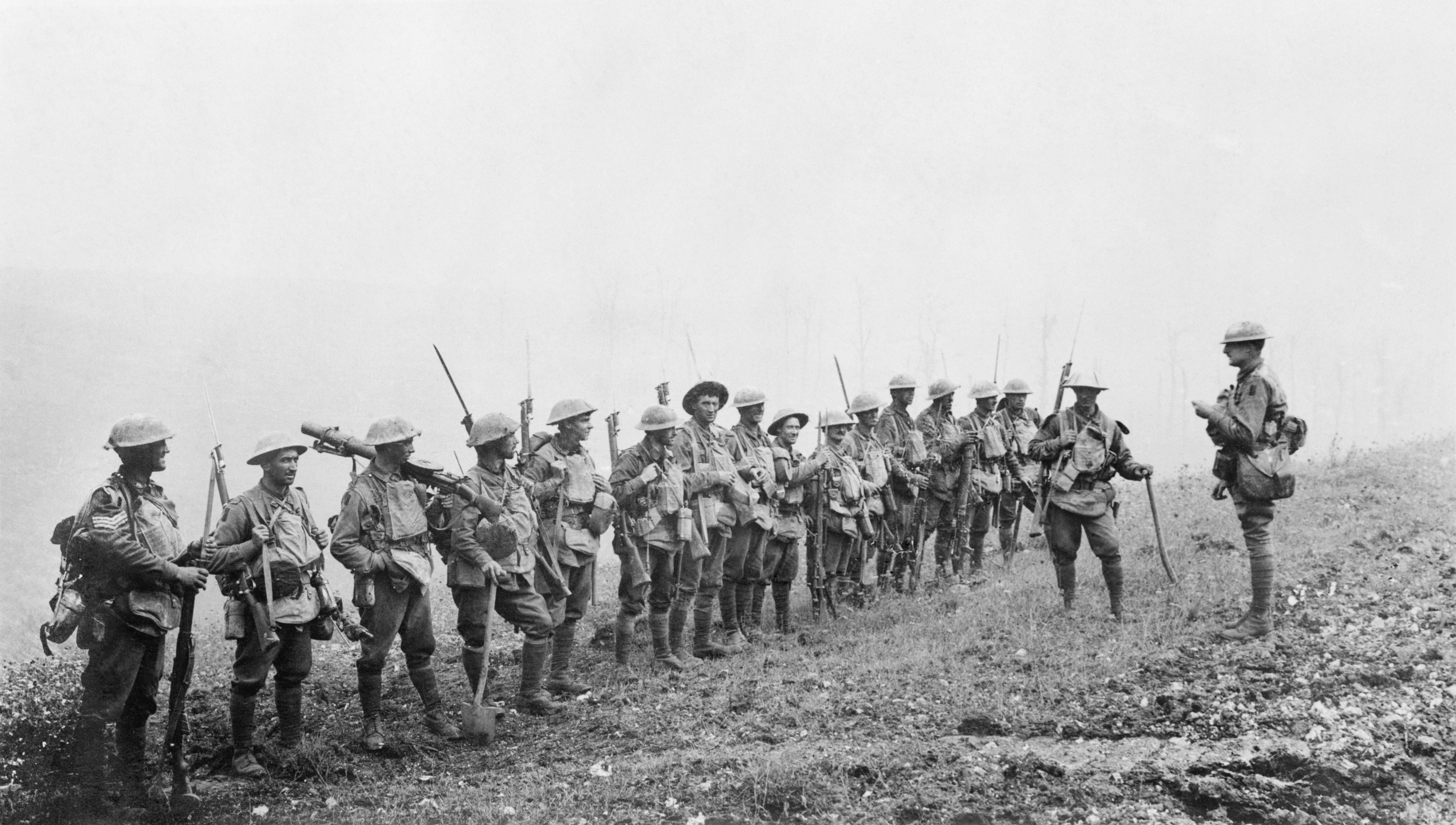
A Platoon from the 29th Battalion in August 1918.

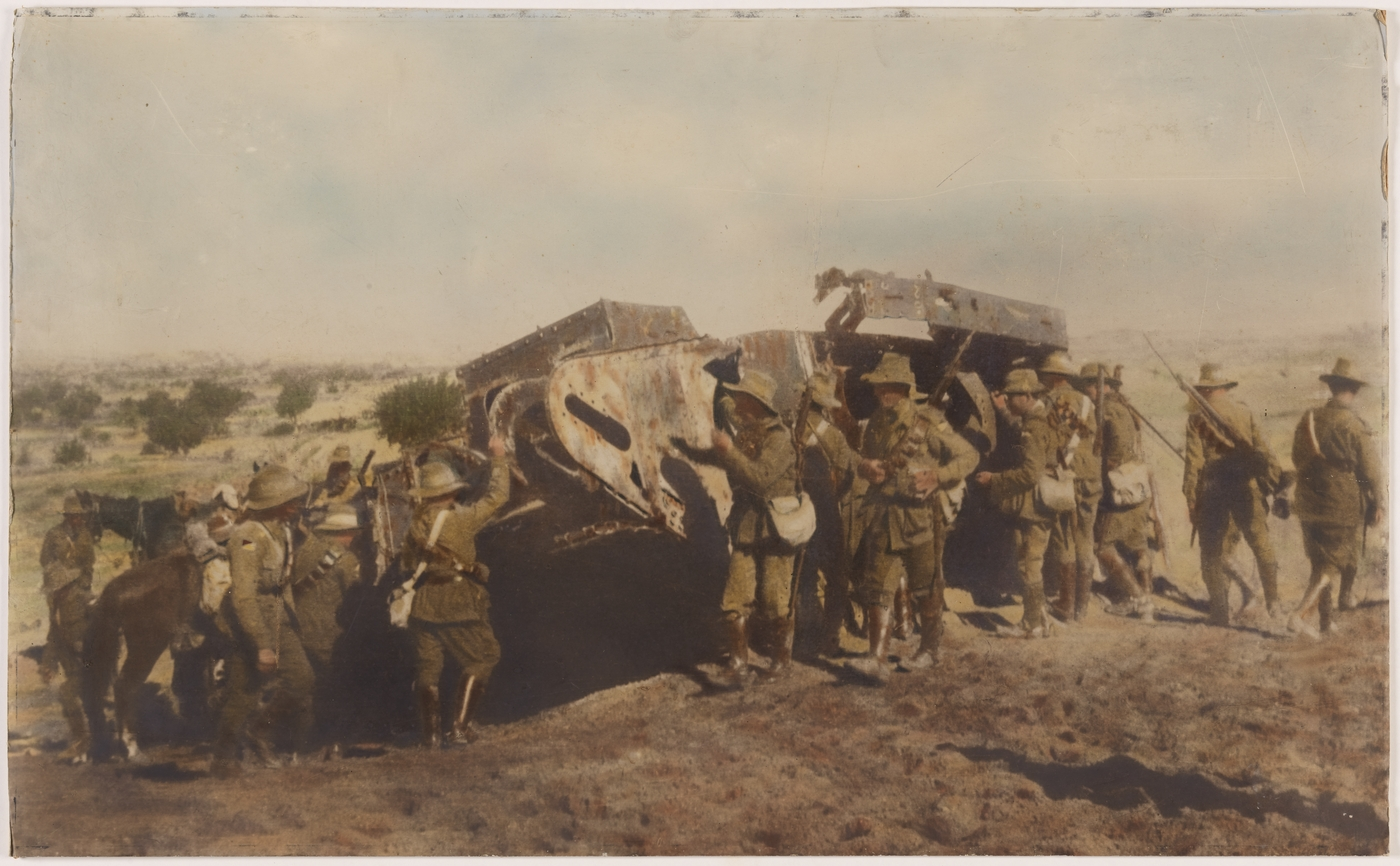
Australian light horsemen and a tank.

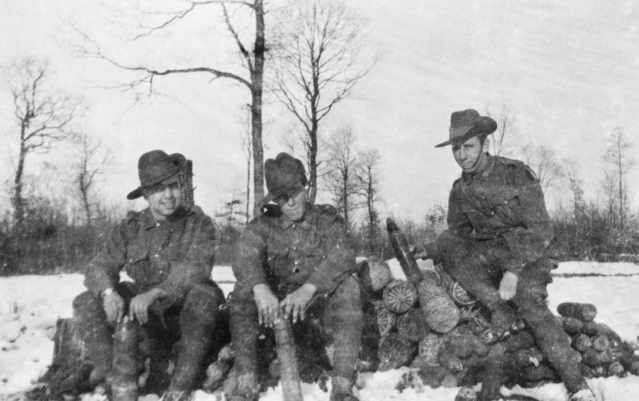
Australian soldiers from the NRRF in Russia, 1919.

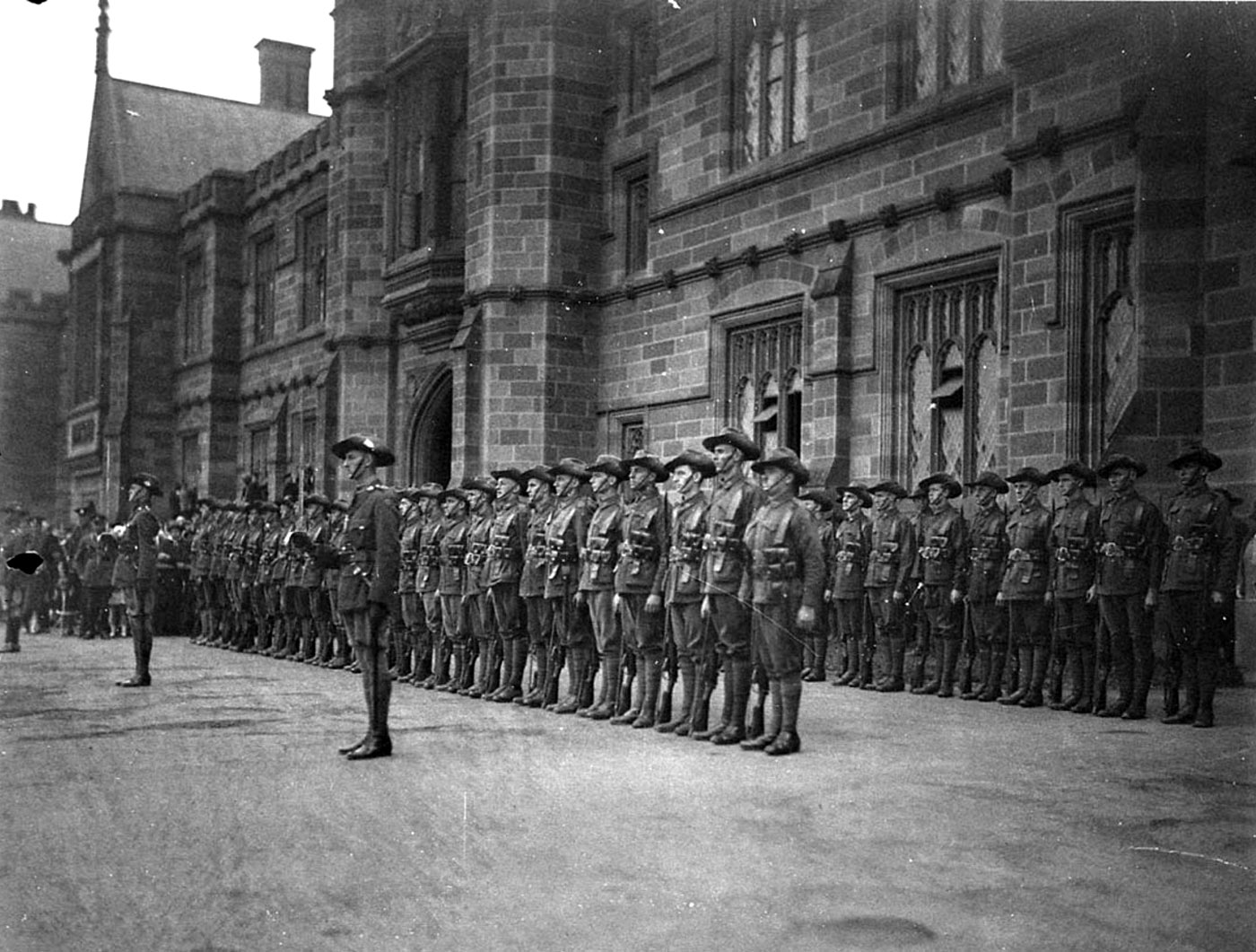
The Sydney University Regiment forms a guard of honour for the Duke of York in 1927

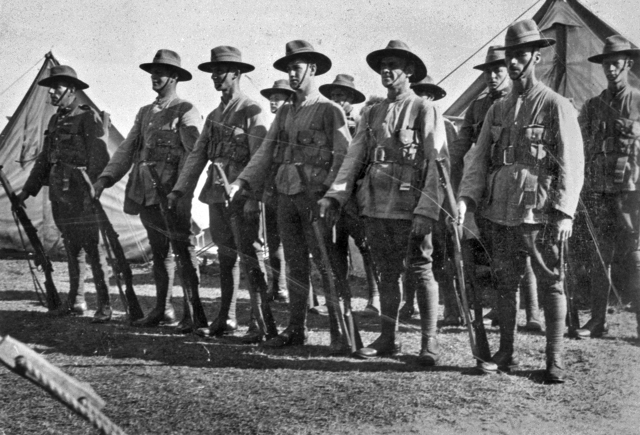
Soldiers of the CMF 56th Battalion in 1937, wearing World War I-era uniforms.

=== Second World War ===
Although there were a few minor changes, on the main the Second Australian Imperial Force (2nd AIF) raised for service following the outbreak of the Second World War was of a similar pattern to that worn by the 1st AIF. The woollen service dress of the previous war was re-issued, although trousers replaced breeches and cloth anklets were adopted instead of puttees. For summer or warm climates khaki drill-cotton clothing was issued. Units wore the shoulder patch of the corresponding unit of the 1st AIF, with a grey border to distinguish the unit from the Militia unit wearing the same patch. The shape of the grey indicated the division, which sometimes differed from that of the coloured part. Later, AIF personnel in Militia units were authorised to wear the grey border, resulting in some units wearing the same patches. The 9th Division replaced all its patches with a new type in the shape of a "T". As there were more units in the Second AIF than the First, many units wore patches of a new design.

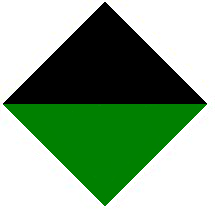
17th Battalion 1921–1944

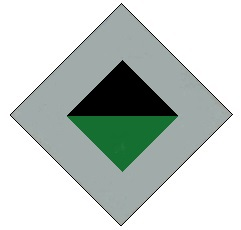
2/17th Battalion 1940–1942

2/17th Battalion 1942–1946

Over-time the pre-war uniforms of the militia were replaced with khaki service dress and in 1942 regimental badges were universally replaced by the Rising Sun, with UCPs being the main distinction between troops of the Militia and AIF. Some minor changes to the appearance of the service dress jack occurred mid-war, while cloth anklets were also later by webbing gaiters. Meanwhile, during the course of the war uniform colour was changed to jungle green following the transfer of the bulk of Australian forces from the Middle East to the Pacific to fight against the Japanese in 1942. Troops hastily sent to New Guinea in the early stages of the campaign had to dye a lot of their existing khaki clothing green, although this tended to run in the heavy tropical rain. The British steel Brodie helmet continued to be used, including the Mark II model of 1940 and the Mark III model from 1944. Steel helmets were unpopular with the soldiers in the jungle climate. Some items of American equipment were adopted, such as long canvas gaiters. Eventually a range of equipment suitable for jungle conditions was specifically developed in order to meet the requirements of providing both suitable camouflage, as well protection against the mosquitos, fungal growth / mould, and mud prevalent in the tropical environment. This included studded boots, canvas gaiters, and cloth berets, in addition to other items of personal equipment. The establishment of a number of women's services by the Army during the war resulted in the development of a number of distinct uniforms, although these were mostly similar in colour and style to the uniform of the male services, including the wearing of trousers when in the field. Despite this the Australian Army Nursing Service opted to retain the grey serge that had been worn by nurses since before the previous war.

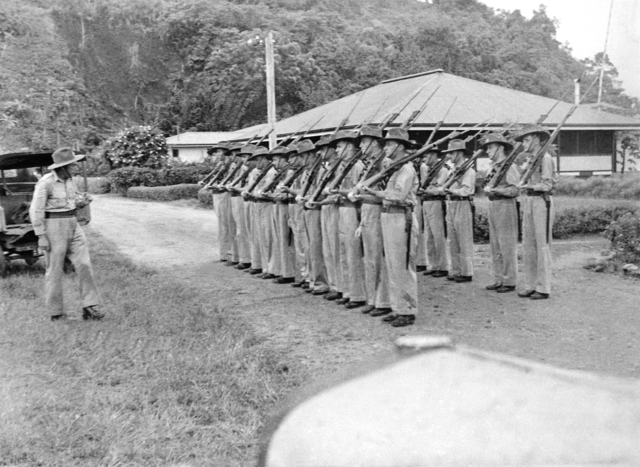
The Salamaua platoon of the New Guinea Volunteer Rifles on parade in April 1940.

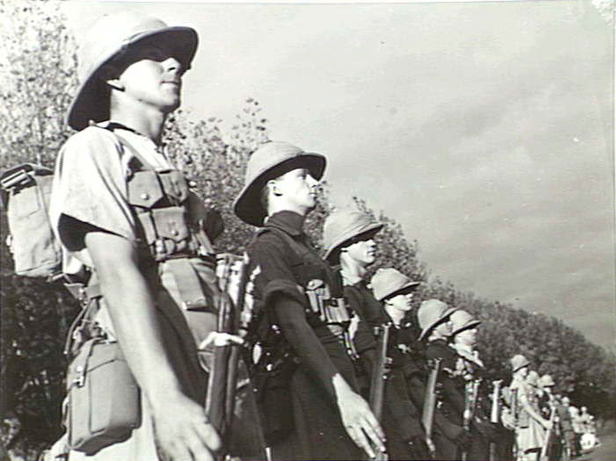
Members of the 5th Battalion, Victorian Scottish Regiment, a militia unit, on parade in April 1940

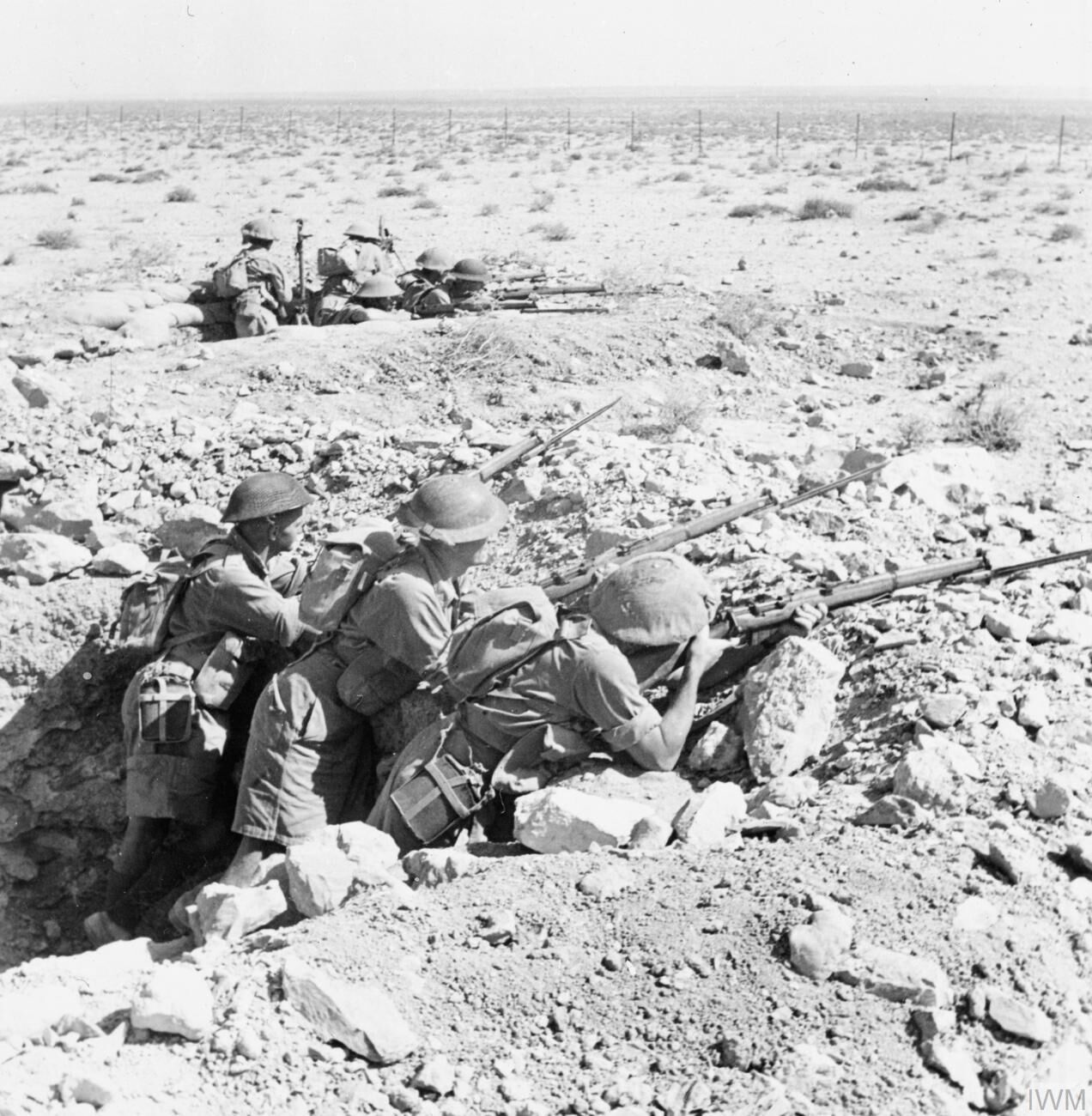
Australian soldiers at Tobruk in 1941.

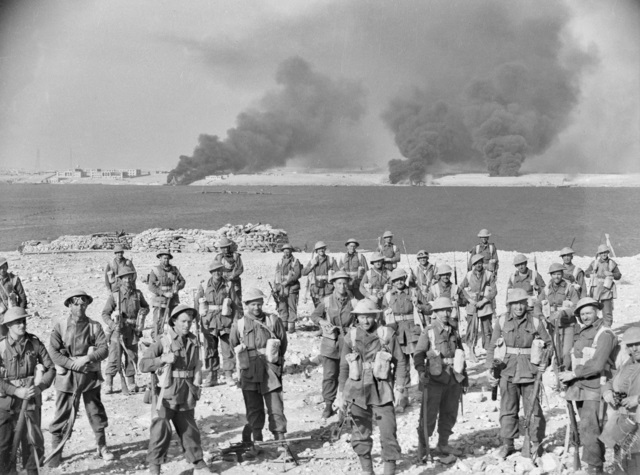
Members of 'C' Company, 2/11th Battalion, having penetrated the Italian outer defences at Tobruk, January 1941

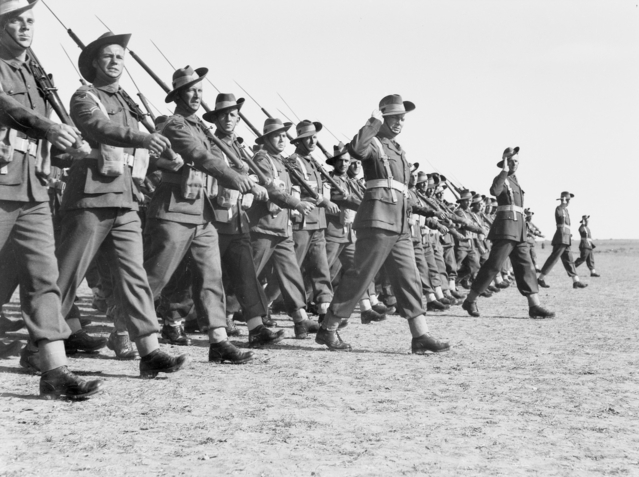
Members of the 9th Division parade at Gaza Airport in late 1942.

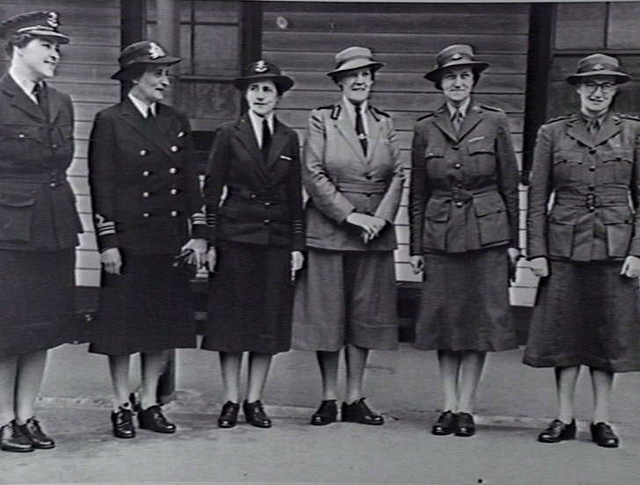
Leaders of the various Australian women's services in 1942.

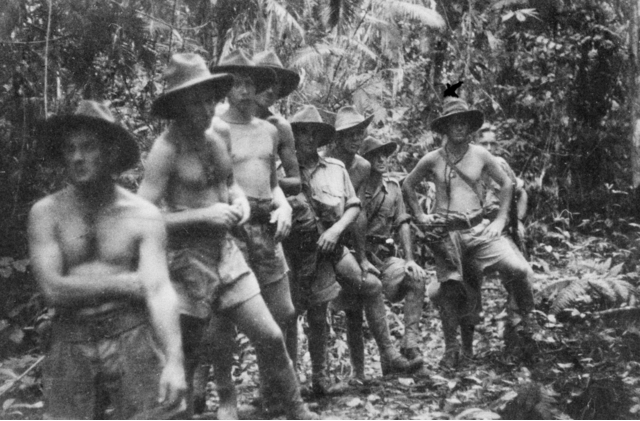
A section of 'C' Platoon, 2/5th Independent Company, marching along a jungle track, west of Bulwa in the Bulolo Valley.

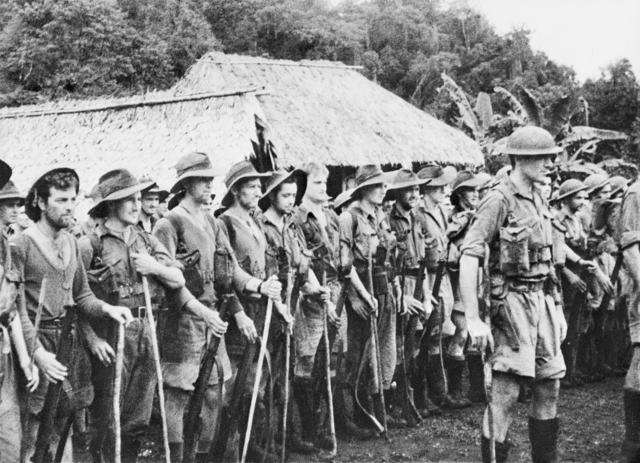
Militia soldiers of the 39th Battalion following their relief at Kokoda in September 1942

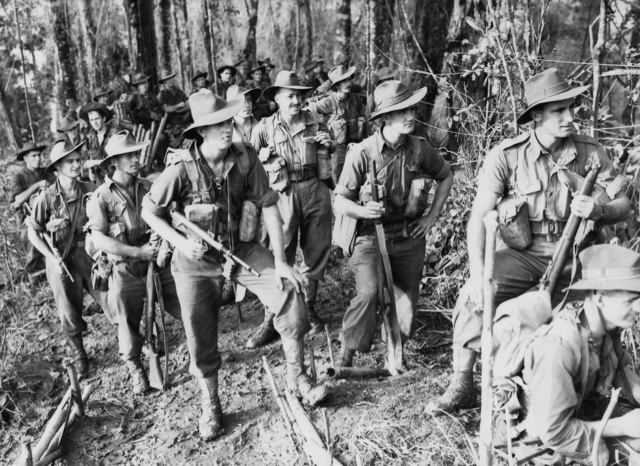
Troops of the 2/16th Battalion, watch aircraft bombarding The Pimple prior to their attack on Japanese positions there, 27 December 1943.

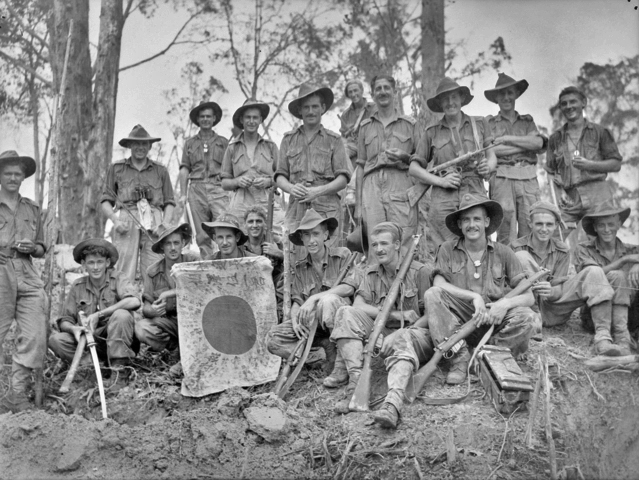
Members of 16 Platoon, D Company, 2/23rd Battalion in Tarakan, June 1945

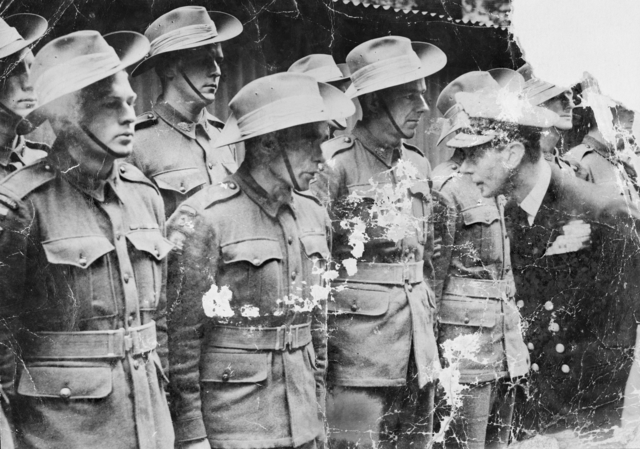
George VI meets Australian Victoria Cross winners in the United Kingdom, June 1946.

=== Cold War ===
In the years following the end of World War II the Australian Army began to adopt a woollen British Battledress blouse and trousers, with unit titles and formation patches made of cloth, and berets. Meanwhile, the use of unit colour patches was discontinued with the raising of the Australian Regular Army in 1947, with units and corps instead distinguished by badges, many of which were similar to those worn by their British counterparts. Being a period of transition, in the early part of the Korean War troops usually wore the old service dress, while later they wore the new battle-dress. Regardless, troops in Korea often adopted a mix of whatever British or American equipment was available out of necessity, with an example being cold-weather equipment. Following this time the uniform of the Australian Army underwent a number of changes, mostly with a trend to increasing "drabness" due to an emphasis on camouflage in combat dress, as well as a reduction in the range of different types of uniform.

During operations in Malaya, Borneo and Vietnam in the 1950s to 1970s the Australian Army wore "Jungle Greens" as fieldwear. "JGs" were first worn by men of the 2nd Australian Imperial Force who served in the Pacific during the Second World War. When part of the 28th Commonwealth Infantry Brigade during Malaya and Borneo, each of the Commonwealth nations including Australia were supplied with British jungle greens. A cloth bush hat (also known as a "giggle-hat") was also worn when in the field. The JGs worn in the Vietnam War were Australian-made and supplied. When New Zealand joined the 1st Australian Task Force in Vietnam, New Zealand soldiers were also supplied by the Australian quartermaster. In situations where there was a higher risk of head injuries, such as when operating inside a Fire support base or travelling by APC the U.S M1 helmet was sometimes worn, often with flak jacket. Later, the shirt was updated with pockets added to the upper sleeves and the breast pockets became slanted, similar to the blouse pockets of the U.S. jungle fatigues worn in Vietnam. These new JGs were nicknamed the "pixie greens".

In Vietnam elements of the Special Air Service Regiment (SASR) wore a variety of uniforms including the indigenous "tiger-stripe" (locally acquired), but more commonly the U.S ERDL Camouflage Tropical Combat Uniform. Personnel posted to South Vietnamese units, such as the Australian Army Training Team (AATTV), also often wore local uniforms.

Up until the 1960s the style of uniform worn by the Australian Army for general duties wear when not in the field was essentially that of the British Army; however, from this time the "polyester" shirt and trousers was introduced. This was later followed by an Australian version of the British Army service dress which consisted of a coat and trousers. In the early 1970s dress for servicewomen changed to the Australian-style, while in the 1980s they adopted the polyester uniform worn by servicemen (with a skirt added). The distinct Australian slouch hat continued to be worn. Meanwhile, in the 1970s and 1980s the Australian Army continued to mostly use the same field clothing and equipment that they had in Vietnam. Mess dress worn by officers also followed the pattern of that worn by the British Army, and included separate styles for summer and winter.

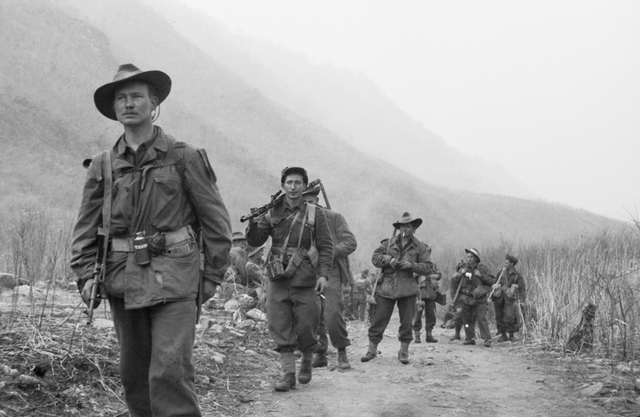
Soldiers from the 3rd Battalion, Royal Australian Regiment (3 RAR) in Korea move forward in 1951.

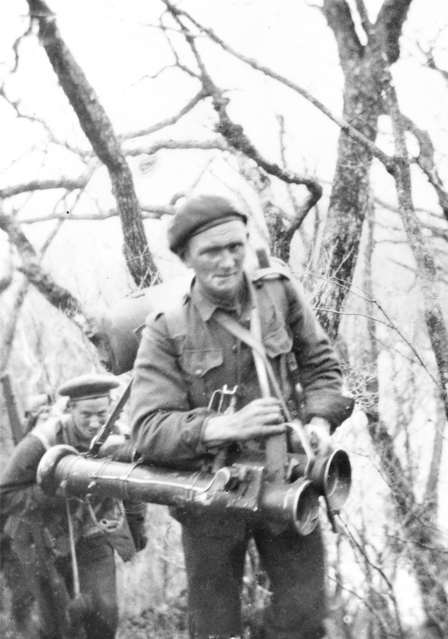
3 RAR soldier in Korea carrying a bazooka, 1951.

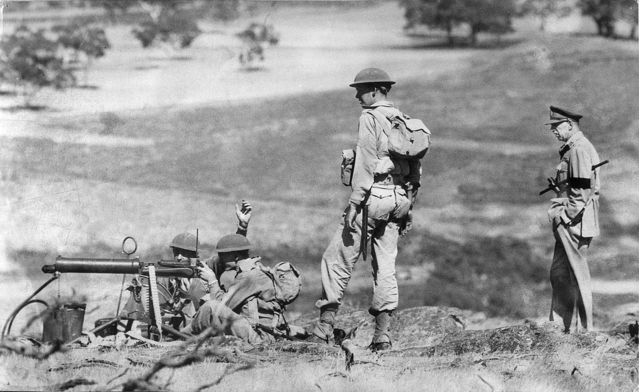
A CMF machine gun team during an exercise in Australia in 1952.

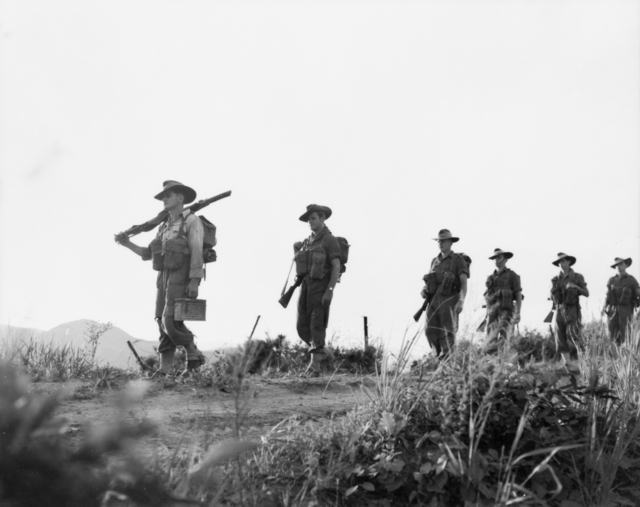
Soldiers from the 2nd Battalion, Royal Australian Regiment (2 RAR) in Korea, July 1953.
Troops from 2RAR in Malaya being inspected whilst on parade, c. 1956.

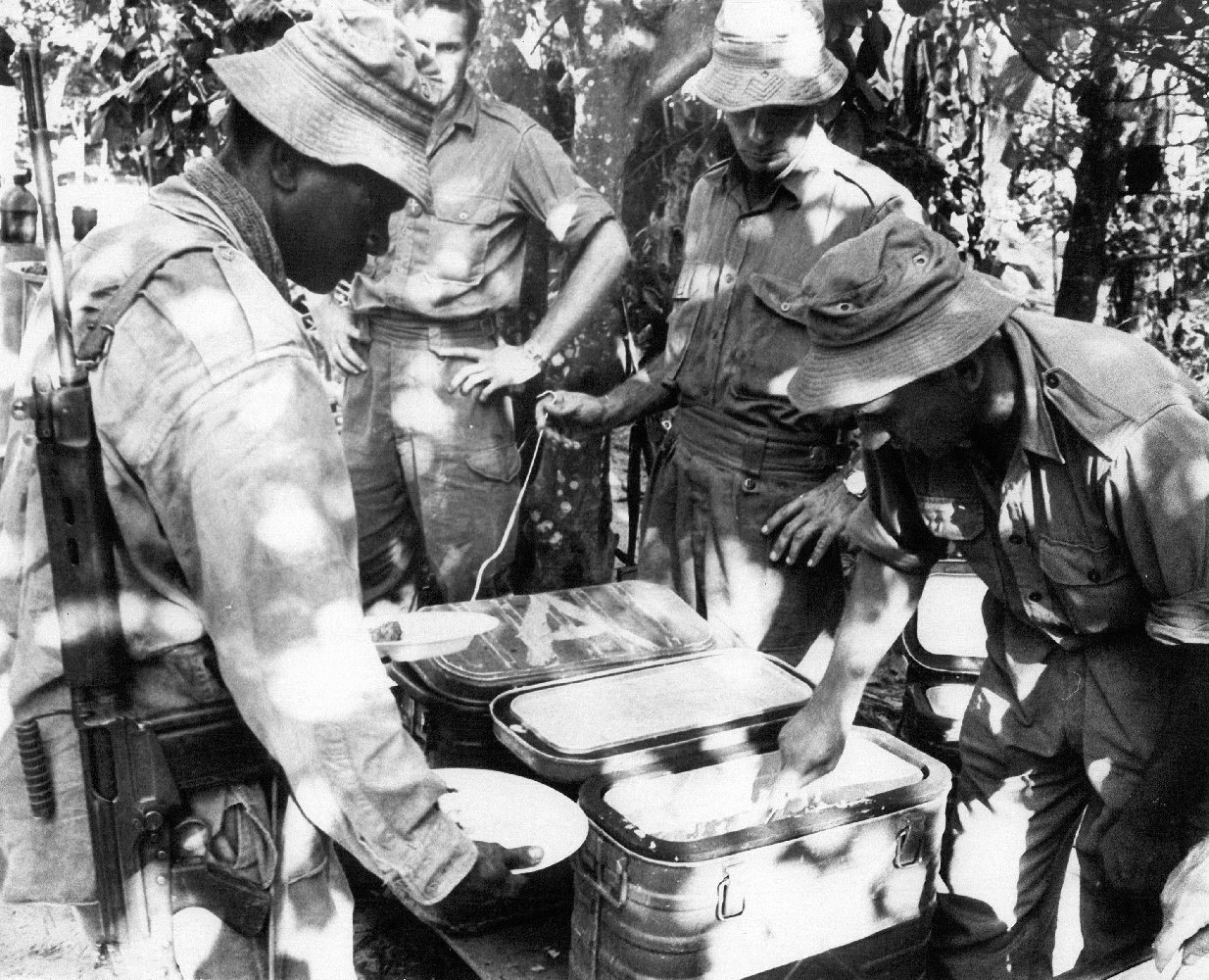
Australian soldiers in Vietnam during Operation Crimp in January 1966.

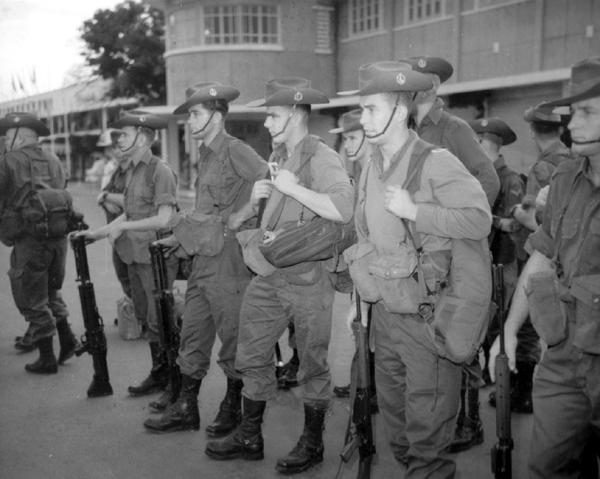
Australians arrive at Tan Son Nhut Airport in Saigon during the Vietnam War.

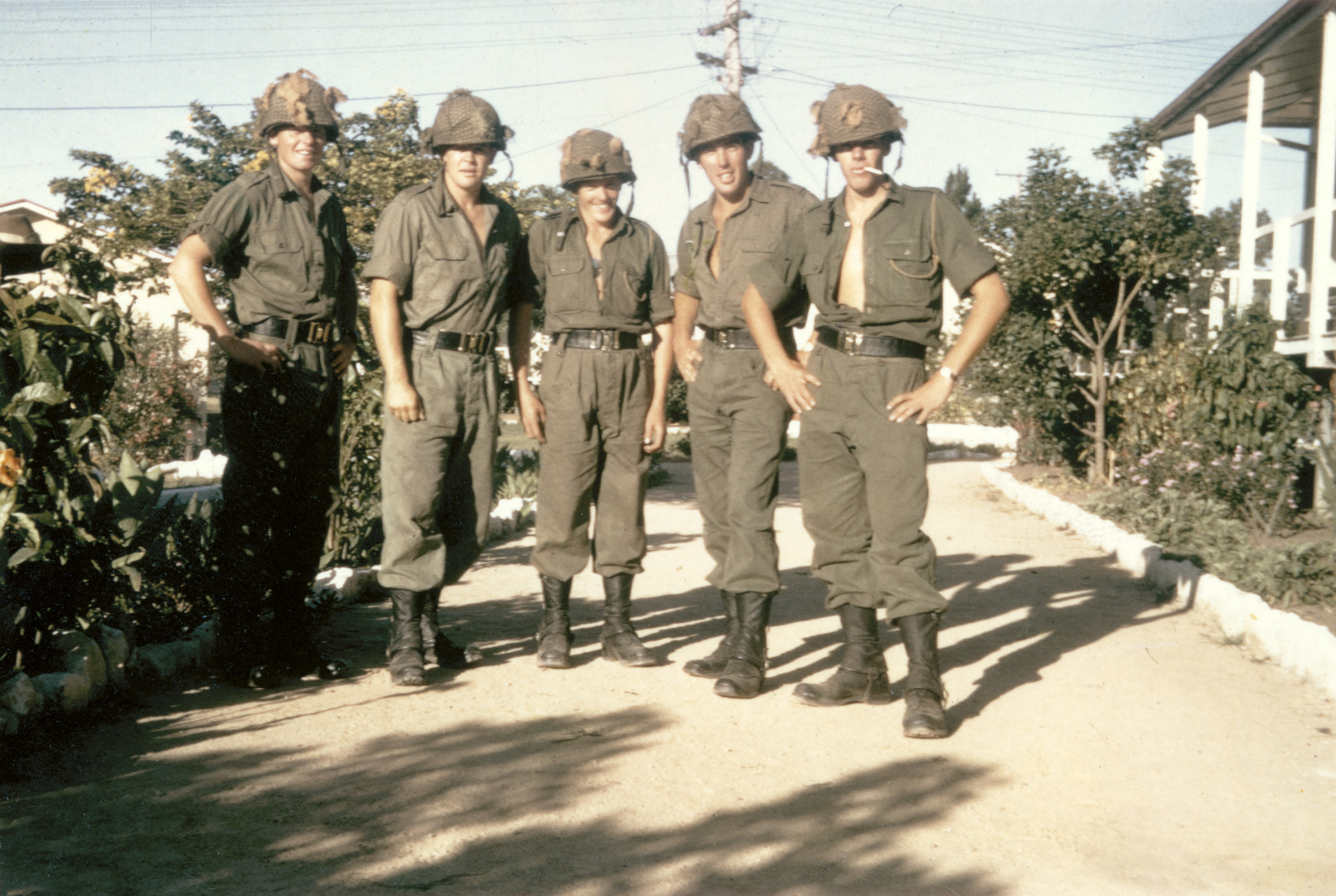
National Servicemen from the 6th Battalion, Royal Australian Regiment before deploying to Vietnam in 1966.

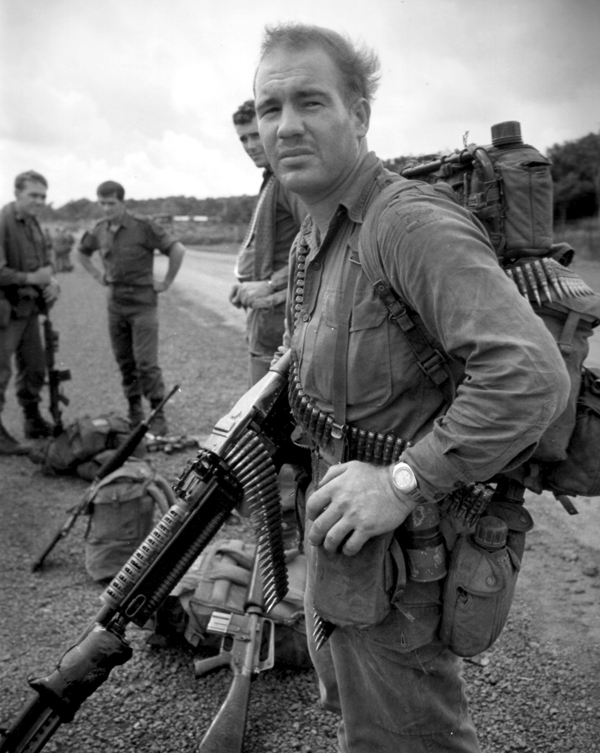
An Australian soldier in South Vietnam.

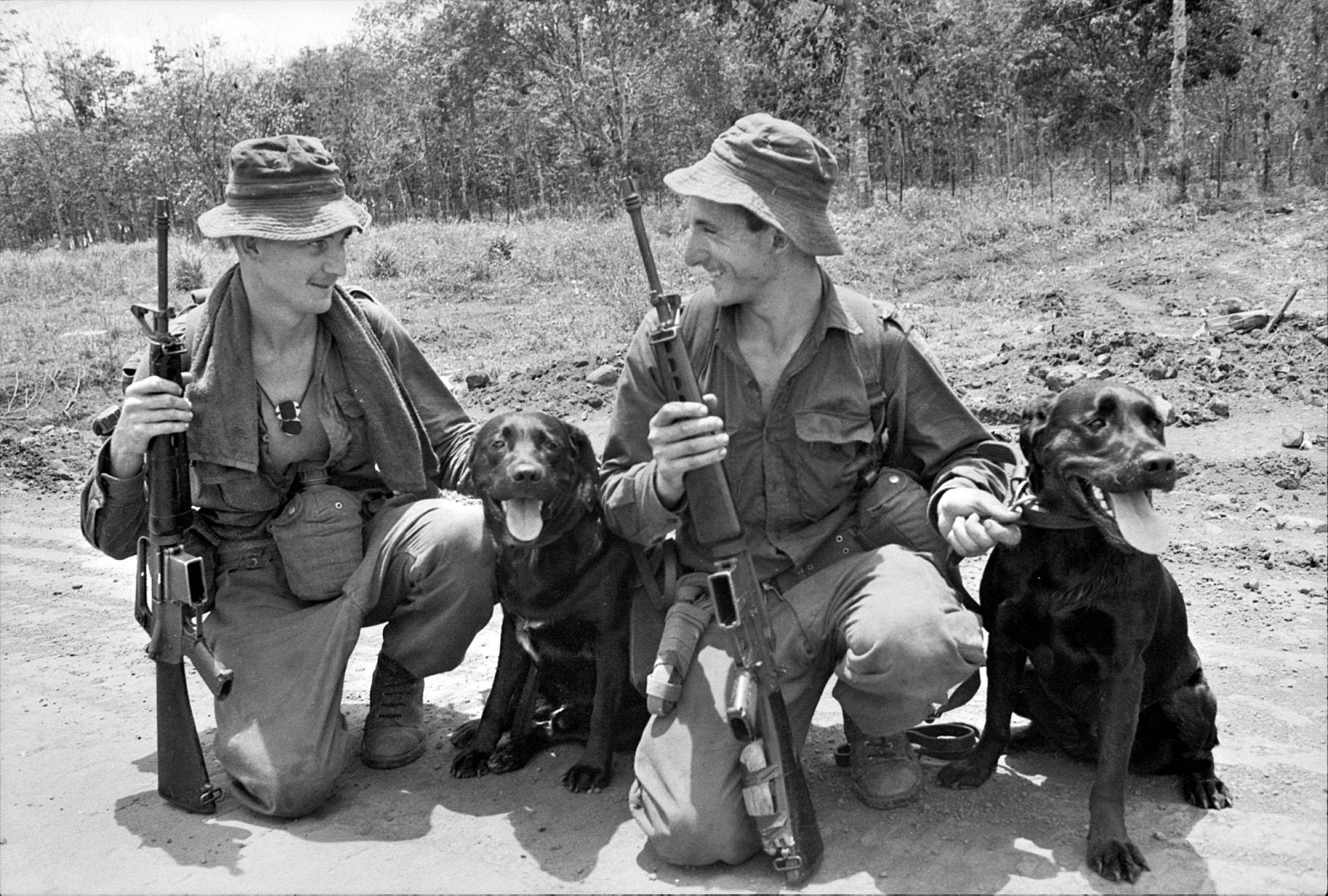
Two Australian soldiers wearing "giggle hats" in South Vietnam, 1967.

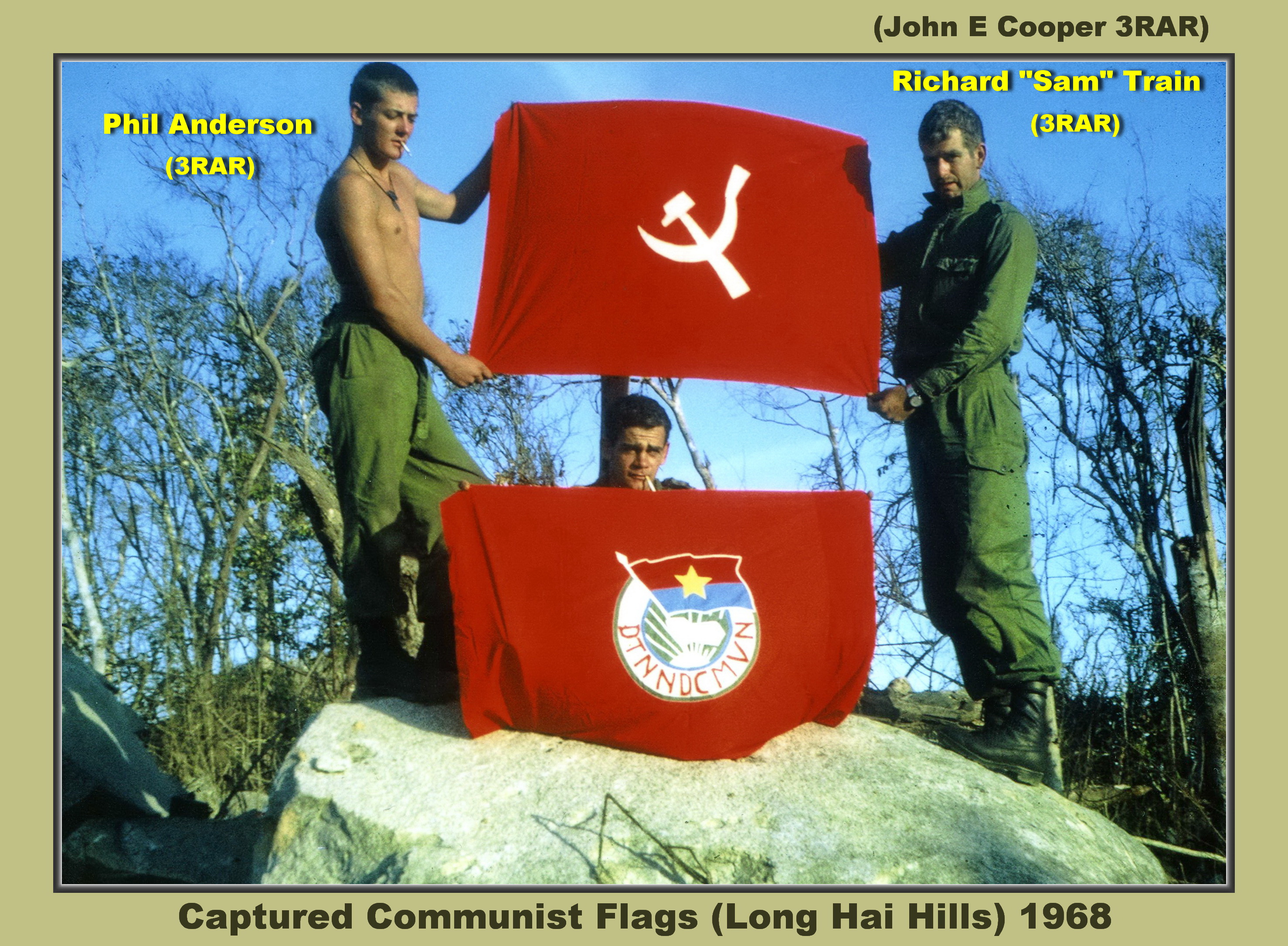
Soldiers from 3 RAR in the Long Hai hills, Phuoc Tuy Province, 1968.

=== 1980s to present ===
The Army's jungle green uniform was replaced in the late 1980s by the Disruptive Pattern Camouflage Uniform (DPCU), lasting from 1987 to 2022, which was specifically designed by the Defence Science and Technology Organisation and optimised for wear in the semi-arid bush of the Australian mainland. DPCU consists of five-tones with a greenish sand coloured background with randomly arranged spots of orange-brown, mid-brown, leaf-green and very dark green overlaid. At this time brown leather boots also replaced the wear of the black leather general purpose boot when in the field. Later, as a result of operations in the arid terrain of Iraq and Afghanistan in the 2000s a Disruptive Pattern Desert Uniform (DPDU) was introduced in 2006. Further changes later resulted in the adoption of the Australian Multicam Camouflage Uniform (AMCU), also known as "Multicam" (and similar to that worn by the US Army and British), from 2014. Using a hybrid pattern and colour palette it is intended to be able to be used in a wide range of terrain and will replace DPCU, DPDU, and other interim uniforms for operational and field use as the Army's only camouflage uniform.

Current Australian Army orders of dress include ceremonial, general duties (polyesters), safari suit, AMCU, and mess dress (corps specific, worn by officers and senior NCOs for formal dining occasions), in addition to specific dress for armoured fighting vehicle crewmen, working / protective dress, maternity dress, and aircrew. AMCU is generally worn as dress of the day in barracks, and when in the field or on operations. The current ceremonial uniform is known as "Service Dress". Changes to this uniform in 2016 have seen a return to a more traditional brown khaki worn prior to and during both World Wars, from the light olive drab khaki that was adopted in the 1990s as other items of dress were phased out. Darker than the previous uniform, it more closely matches the colour of the slouch hat. Ceremonial dress has also included the "Patrol Blue" and "White Jacket" orders of dress, although these were mostly worn at the Royal Military College, Duntroon. In 2010, the Army discontinued the wear of "Patrol Blues", with cadets at Duntroon exclusively wearing "White Jacket" order of dress for ceremonial occasions such as graduation parade; however, this was later restored in 2017 with the "White Jacket" order of dress coming under the "Patrol Blue" order of dress. From 2013 soldiers have been issued elastic-sided R. M. Williams boots to be worn with general duty and ceremonial dress.

Although the uniforms worn by the Australian Army have changed significantly over the past century, the accoutrements worn over this period have remained relatively similar. In the British Army regiments have traditionally often worn their own distinctive uniforms for ceremonial occasions. However, in the Australian Army most personnel wear the same basic uniform, with the distinctive elements being corps and regimental badges, berets, lanyards, and unit colour patches. There are some smaller exceptions worn on general duties and ceremonial uniforms, with some units wearing black badges of rank, unit badges and other accoutrements, instead of the usual gold and yellow or silver and white worn respectively by all corps, while a number of "Scottish" companies and pipes and drum bands wear distinctive tartans and other items of traditional Scottish dress, including headdress, highland dress jacket, kilt, sporran, hose-top socks, and gaiters.

Corps and regimental badges include both hat and collar badges (usually smaller versions of the hat badge). The majority of corps badges in the Australian Army are copied from the badges of the equivalent corps in the British Army. Berets colours include dark blue (worn by service corps and others not eligible to wear a special-to-corps or unit beret), black (armoured corps), rifle green (Royal Australian Regiment), sand-coloured aka. "sandy" (SASR), sherwood green (commandos), dull cherry (airborne), scarlet (military police), slate grey (nursing corps), light blue (aviation), UN blue (personnel on service with the United Nations) and terracotta (Multinational Force and Observers contingents). Lanyards vary in colour by corps and unit are mostly worn on the right shoulder, although units of the infantry corps wear them on the left, as do some members of the artillery, and the Australian Federation Guard. Different colours and designs are allocated to each corps and many units. Unit colour patches were re-introduced in 1987 for units that could trace their lineage back to units of either the 1st or 2nd AIF, while the current Series II colour patch was adopted in 1995, introducing a system of patches designed for all units and organisations of the Army. At this time the practice of wearing patches on the shoulder ceased, and they were worn on the right-hand side of the puggaree on the slouch hat instead.

Other accoutrements worn include: the rising sun badge (cloth version worn on left shoulder of all uniforms including AMCU, and metal badge worn on upturned side of slouch hat when worn on ceremonial occasions), aiguillettes (senior officers), emu plumes and bandoliers (both worn by armoured units), the Sam Browne belt (worn by officers and warrant officers), mostly of brown leather although the armoured, aviation and nursing corps wear black leather), infantry scarlet sash, gorget patches (senior officers), pace sticks (regimental sergeant majors), canes / swagger sticks, lances (armoured units on parade), bayonets, dirks ("Scottish" units), stiletto daggers (commandos), swords (Mameluke for general officers, also cavalry sabres, artillery swords, and infantry swords respectively, while the claymore is carried by officers in "Scottish" units). Headdress consists of the slouch hat or beret for general duties, although bonnets are also worn by "Scottish" units and pipes and drum bands (glengarry and balmoral for units, and feather for bands). The khaki service cap is no longer an optional headdress for warrant officers, commissioned officers and officer/staff cadets which could be worn with any general duty order of dress and working/protective dress until September 2010. However, the blue service cap is still worn mainly with the "Patrol Blue" order of dress by all ranks. Bush hats are worn in the field, while armoured corps and members of RFSUs often wear kepi hats.

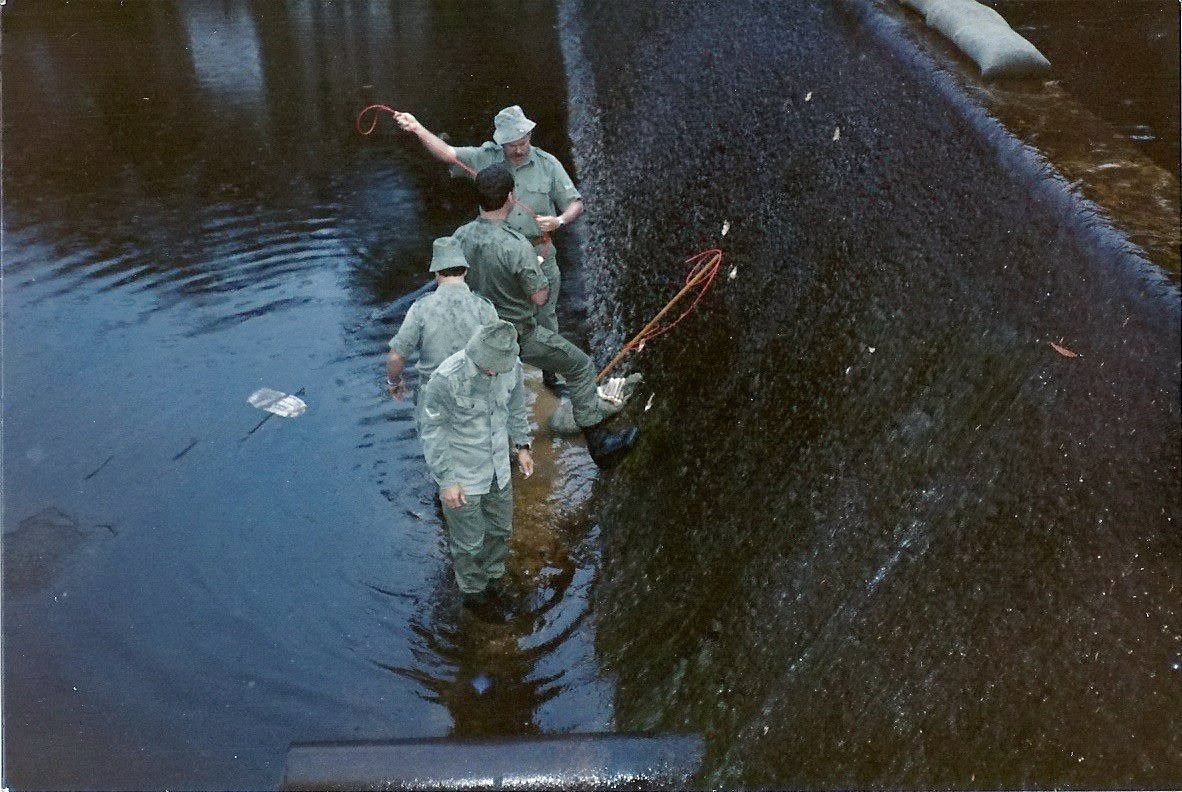
Engineers wearing jungle greens conduct a demolition task in 1982.

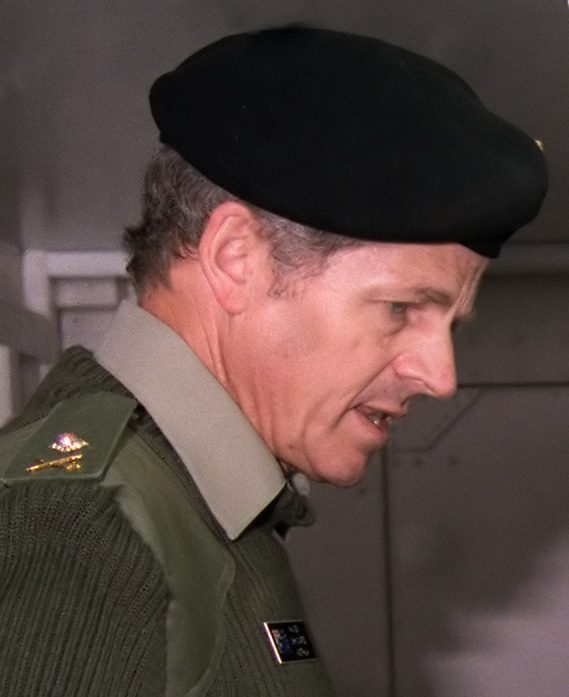
An Australian officer wearing the black beret of the Royal Australian Armoured Corps in 1985.

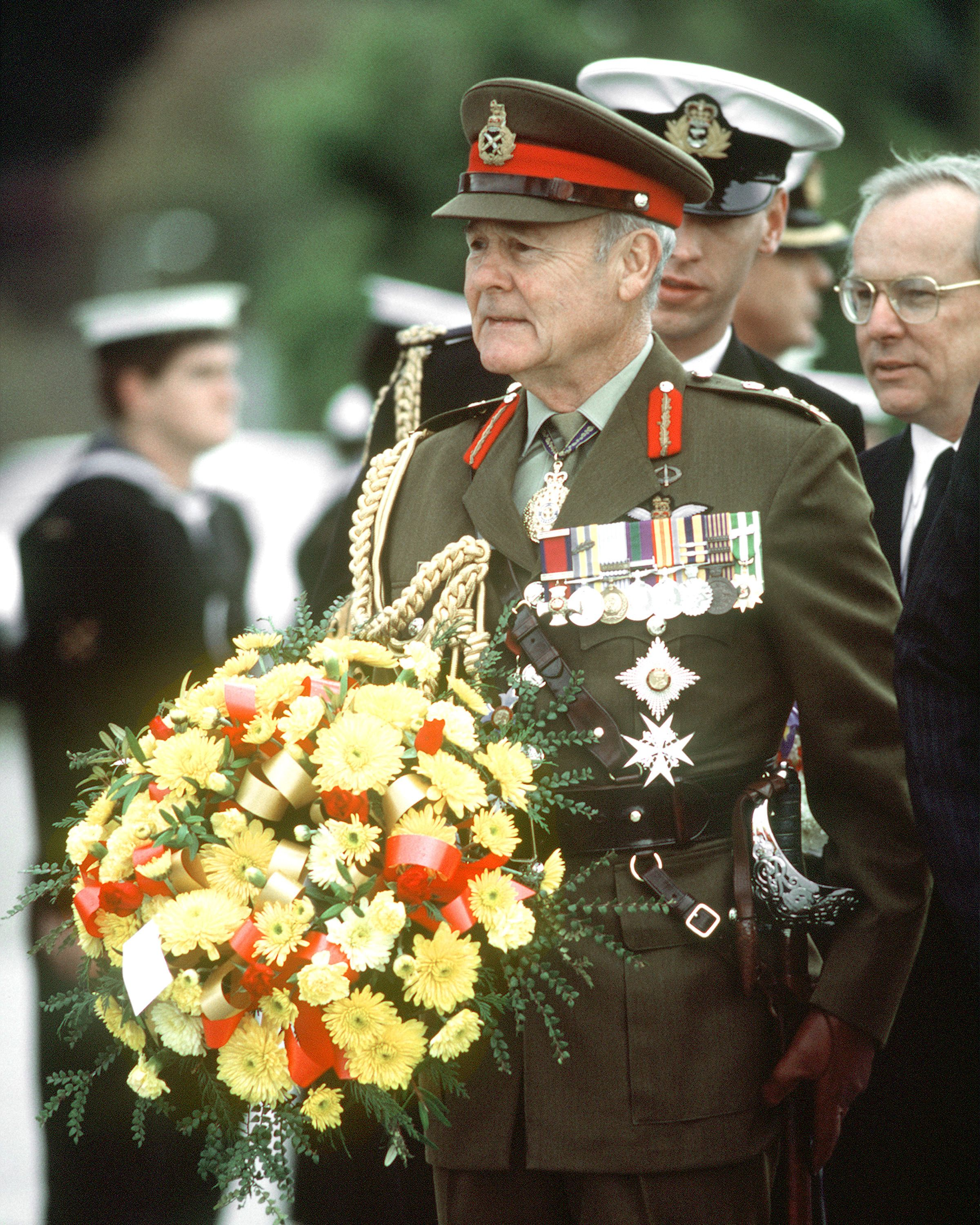
Retired Australian General Sir Phillip Bennett wearing the service dress with the khaki service cap in 1992.

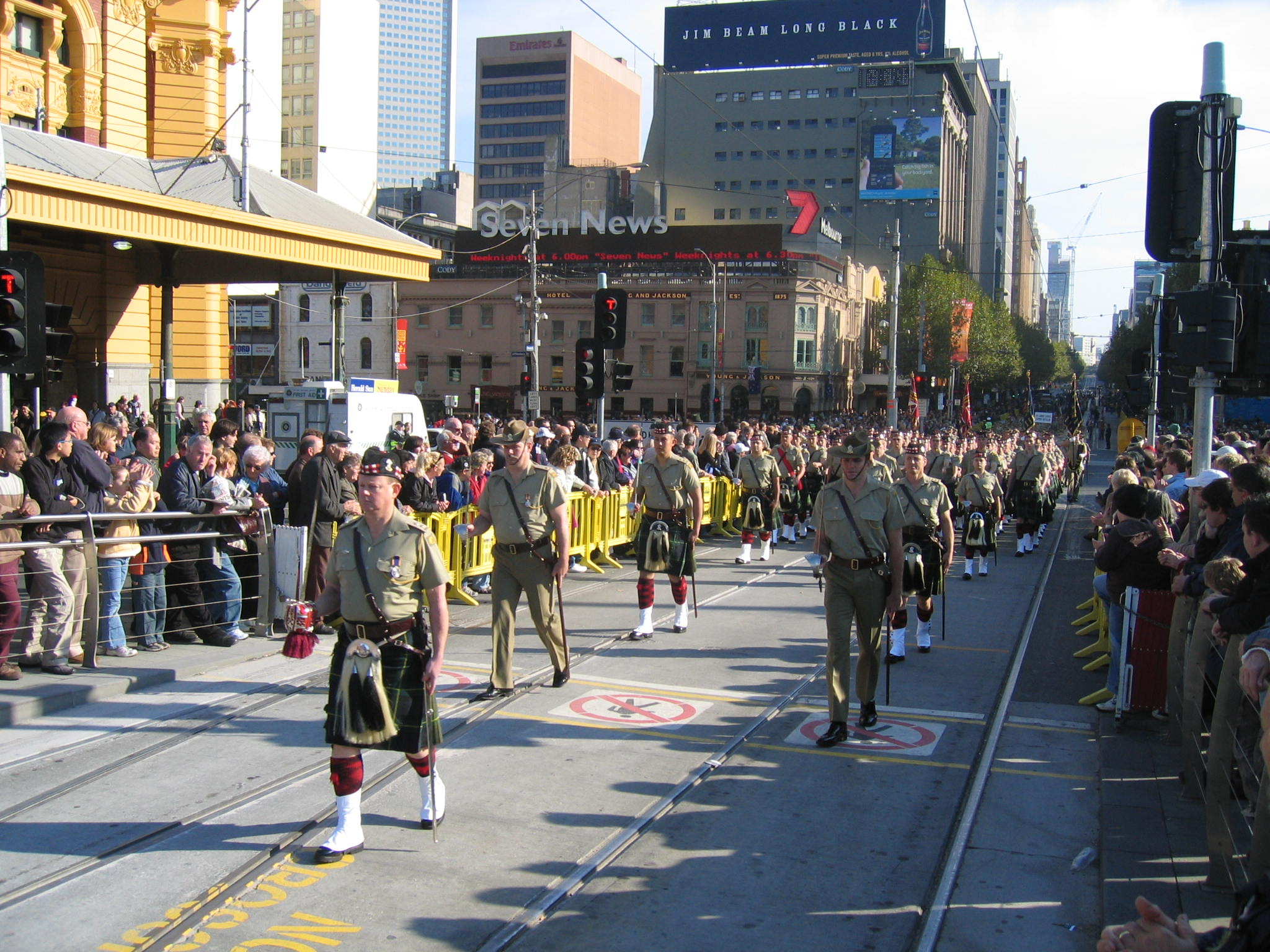
Members of the 5th/6th Battalion, Royal Victoria Regiment wearing Scottish traditional dress marching on ANZAC day in 2006.

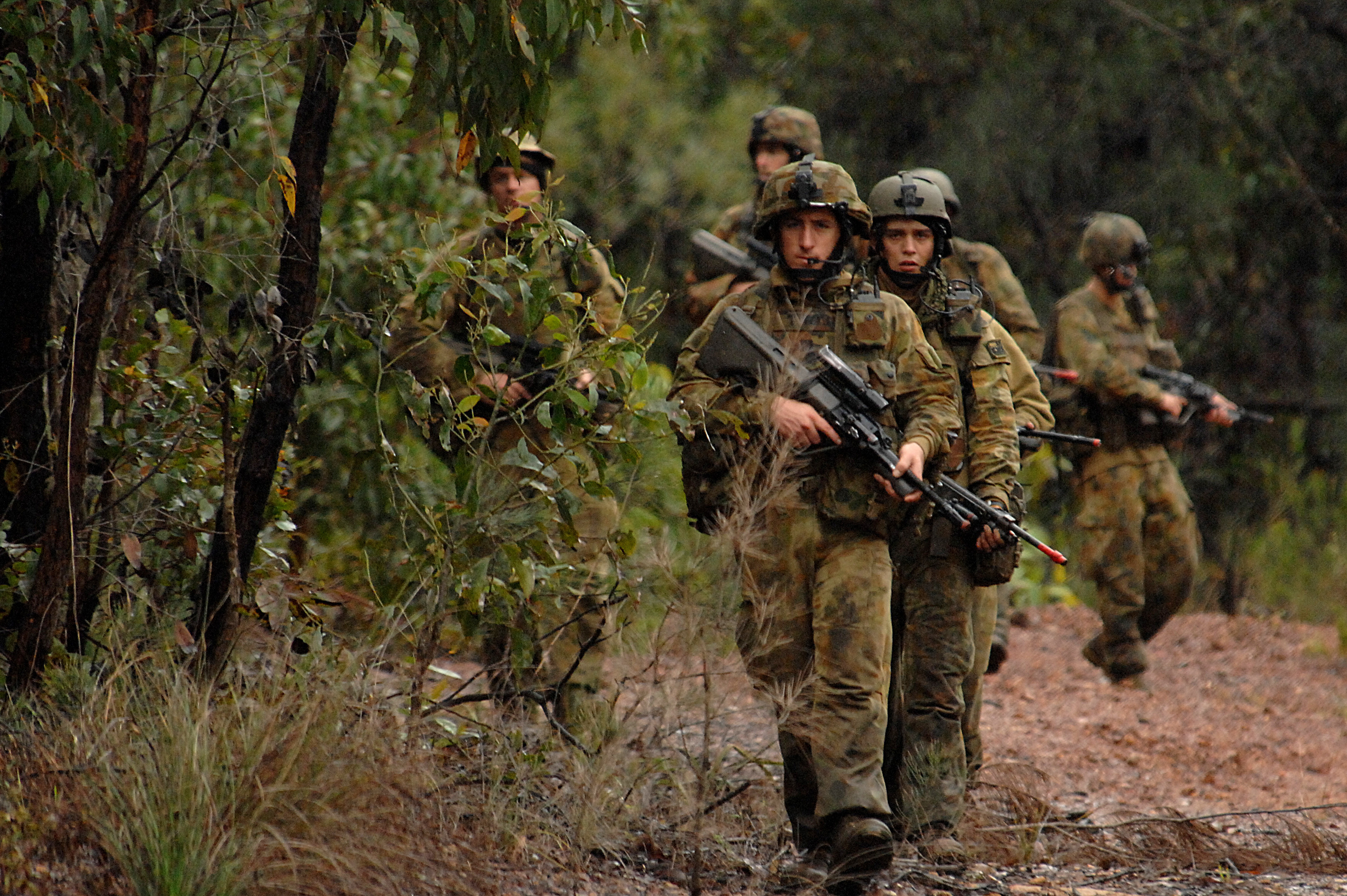
Soldiers from 2 RAR wearing DPCU on patrol during Exercise Talisman Sabre 2007.

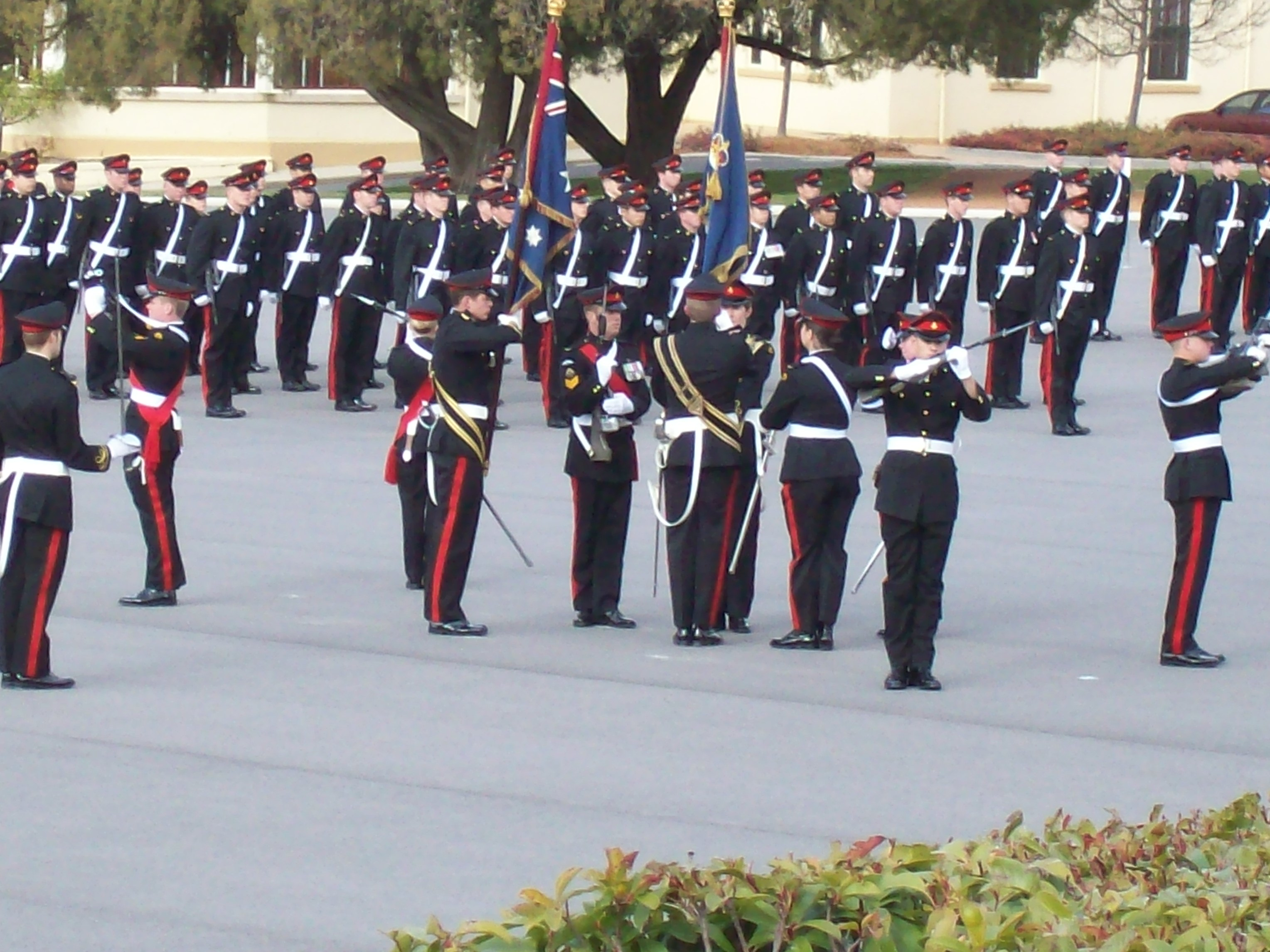
Cadets wearing Patrol Blues during graduation parade at the Royal Military College, Duntroon in June 2008.

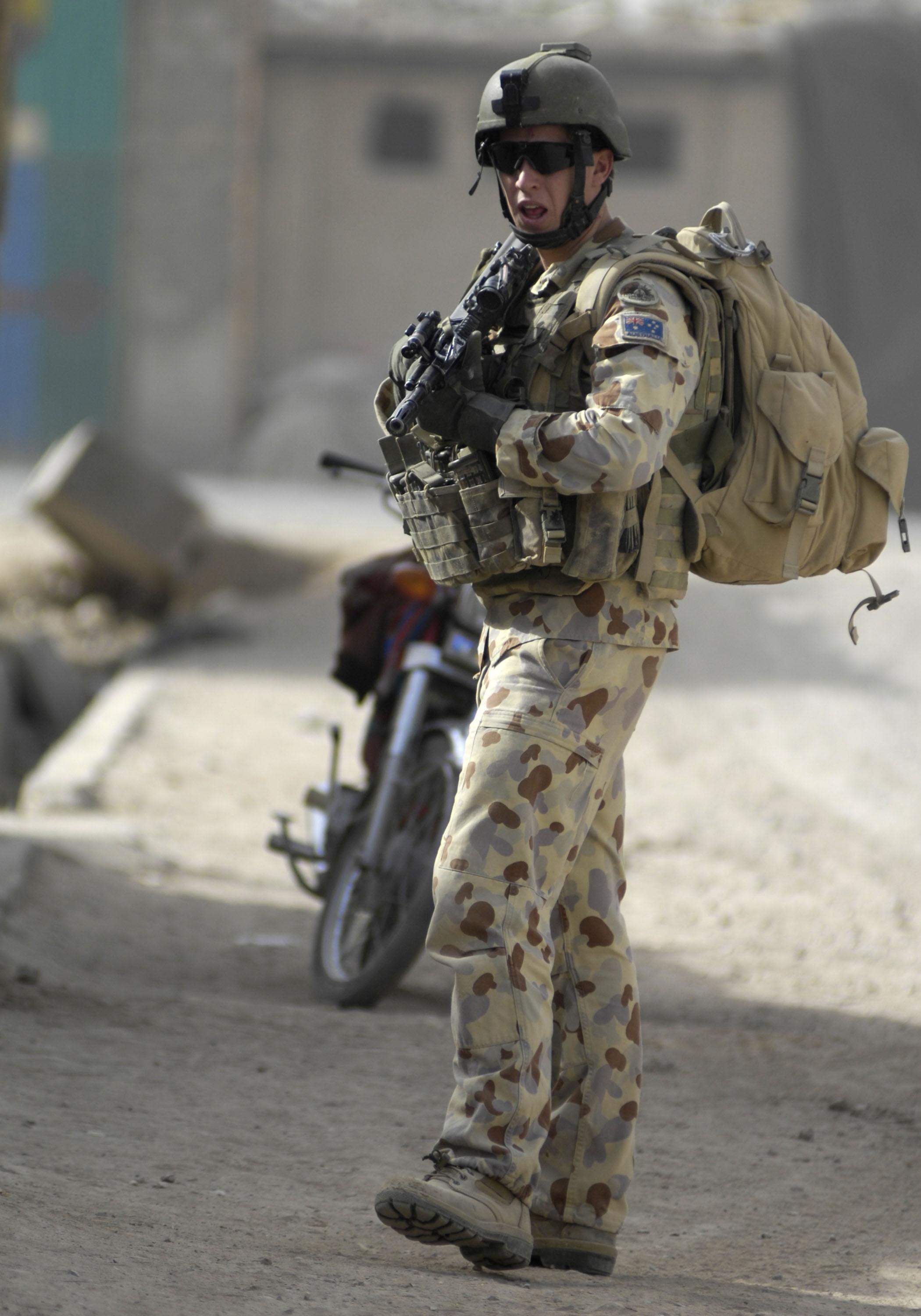
An Australian soldier wearing DPDU in Afghanistan, August 2008.

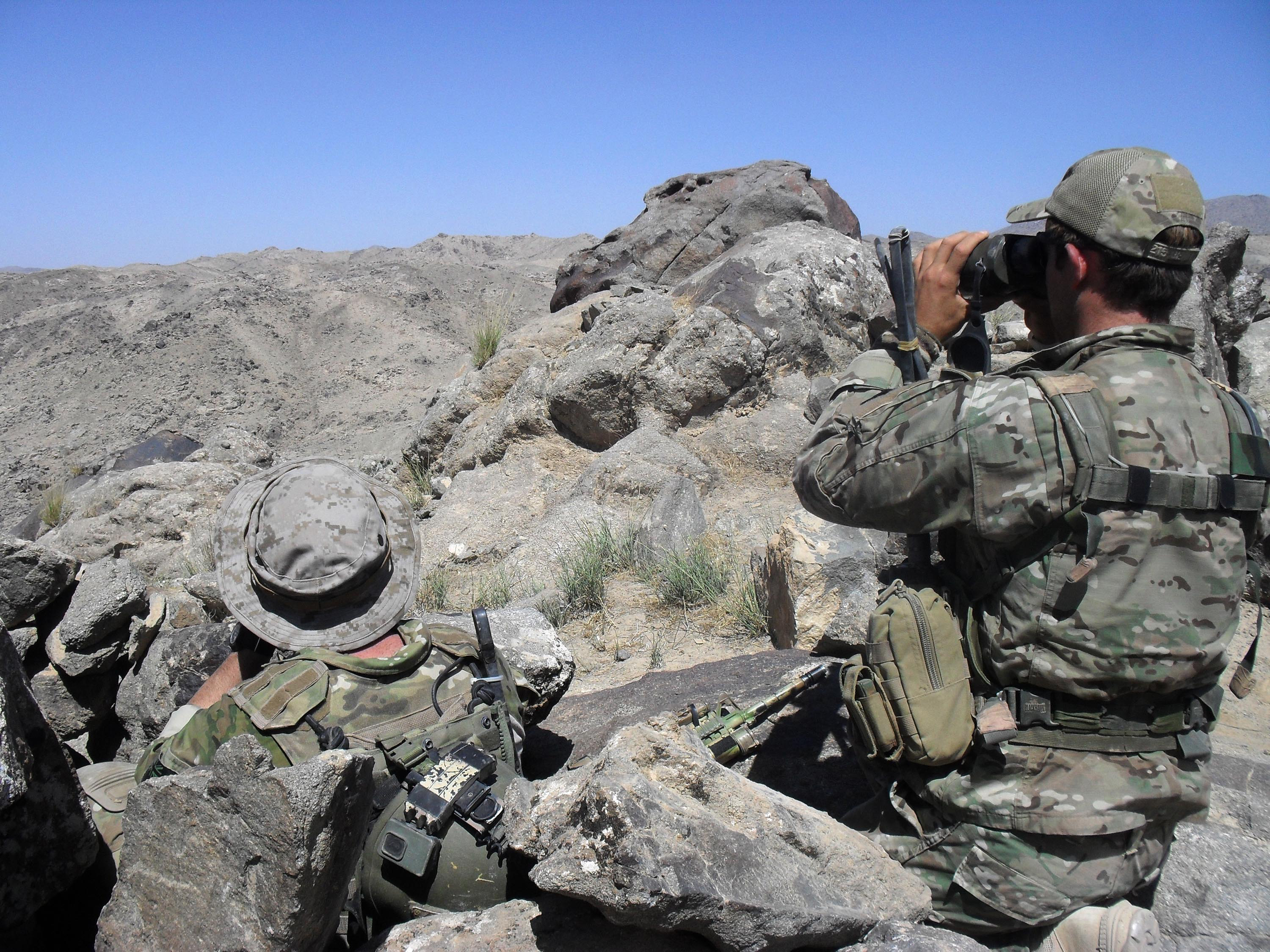
Australian special forces in Multicam during operations in Afghanistan, June 2010.

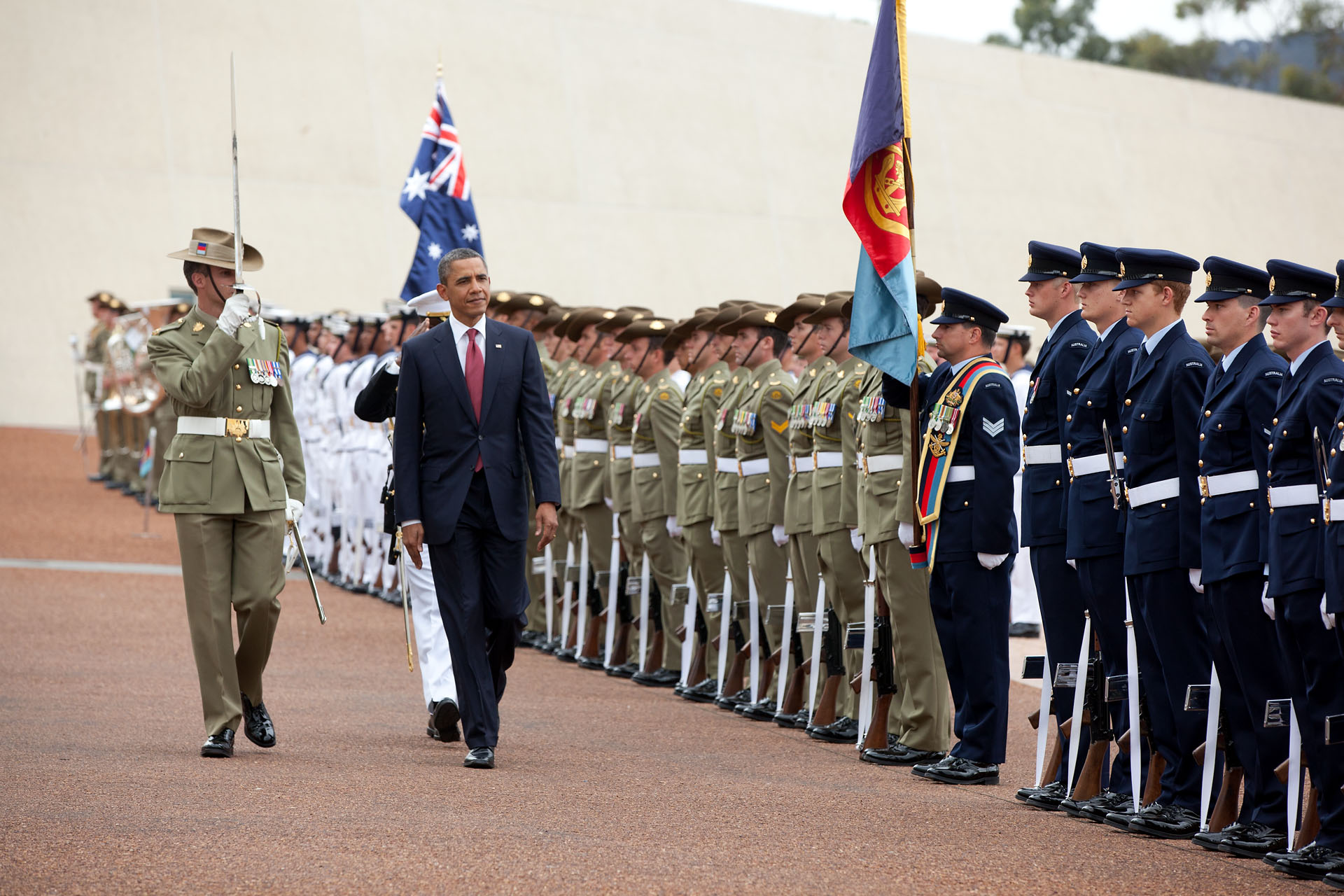
President Barack Obama reviewing the Australian Federation Guard in November 2011

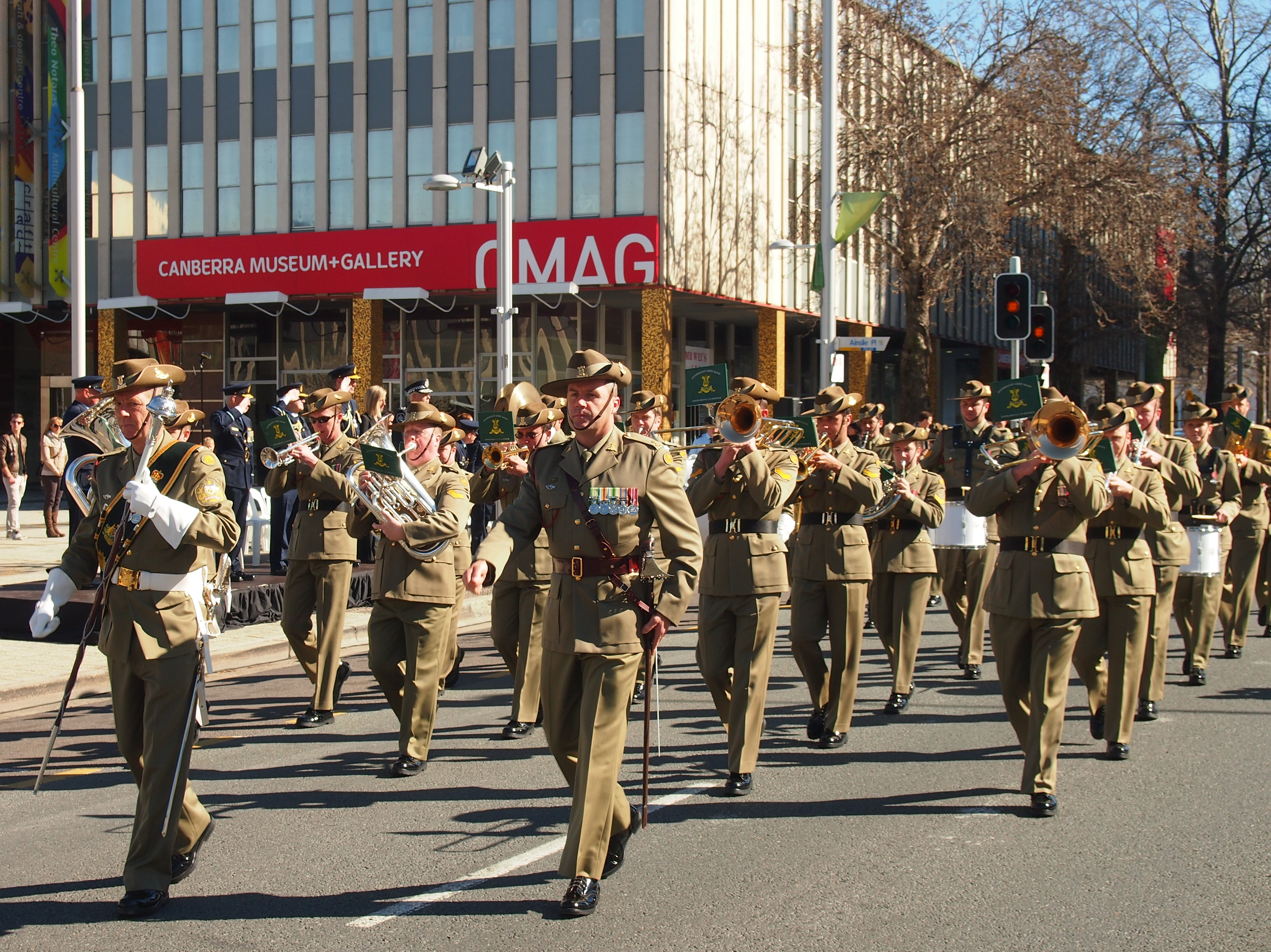
Australian Army Band on parade in Canberra wearing ceremonial service dress, August 2013.

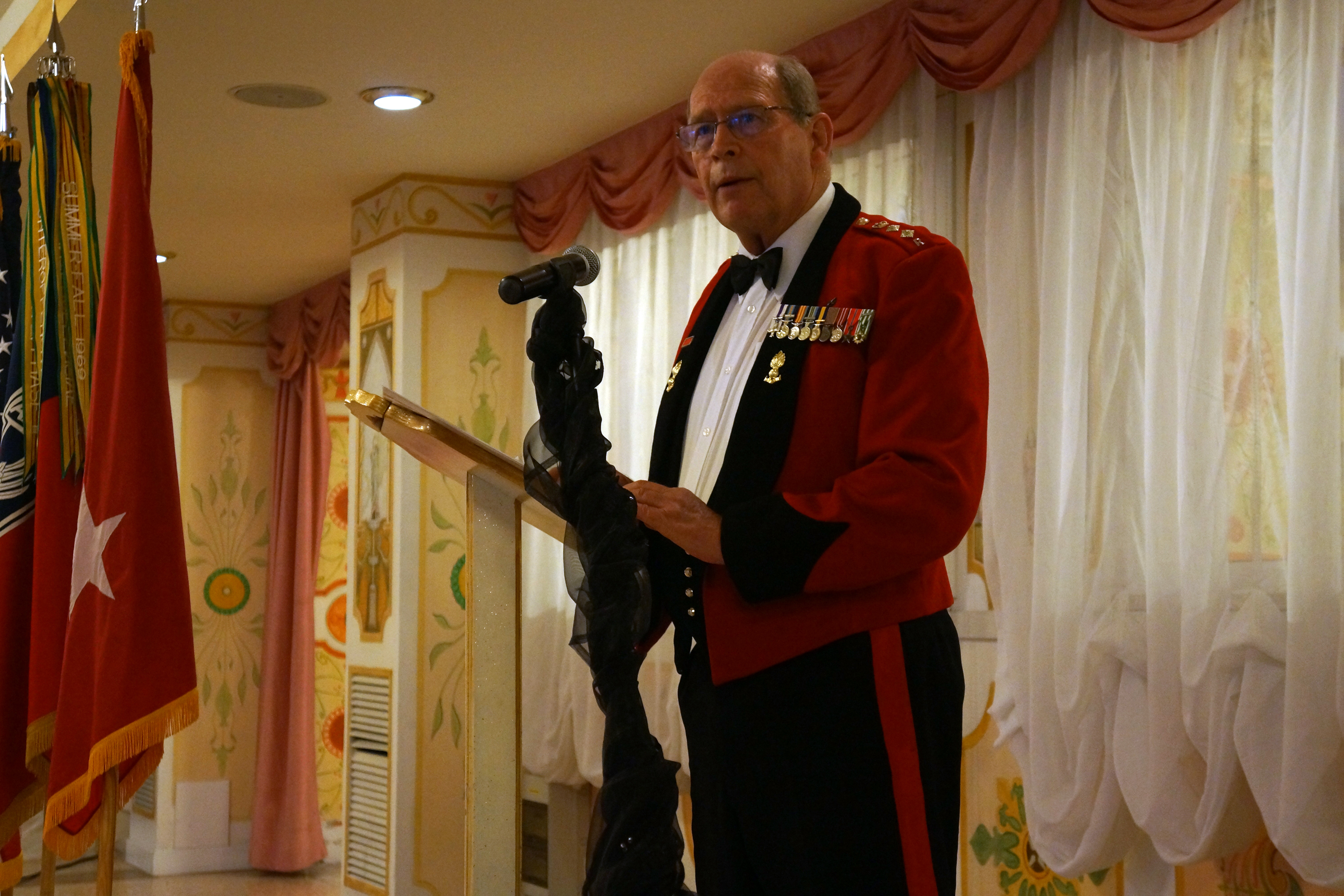
Officer in the winter mess dress of the Royal Australian Engineers in 2014.

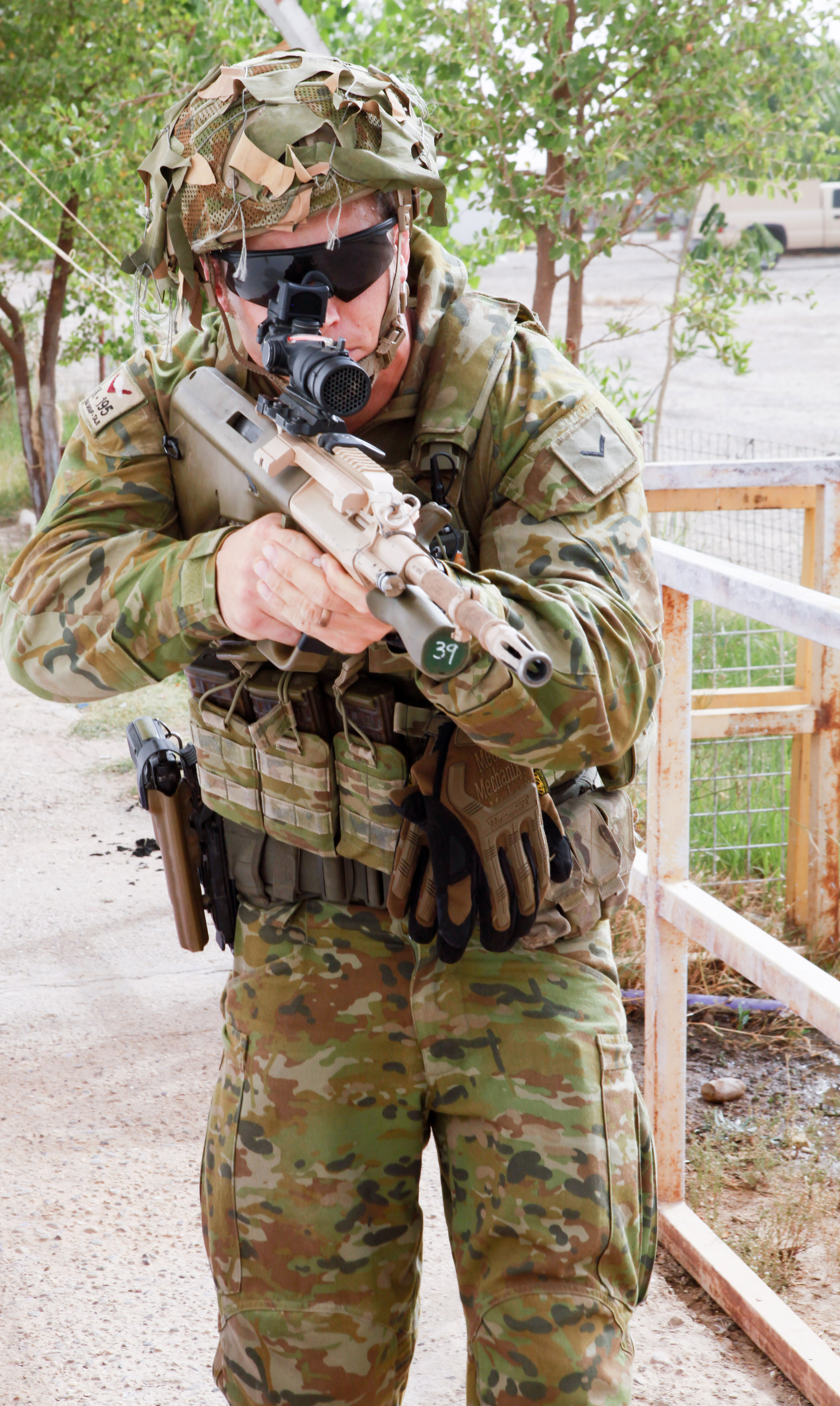
Soldier wearing AMCU combat uniform and equipment in Iraq, 2016

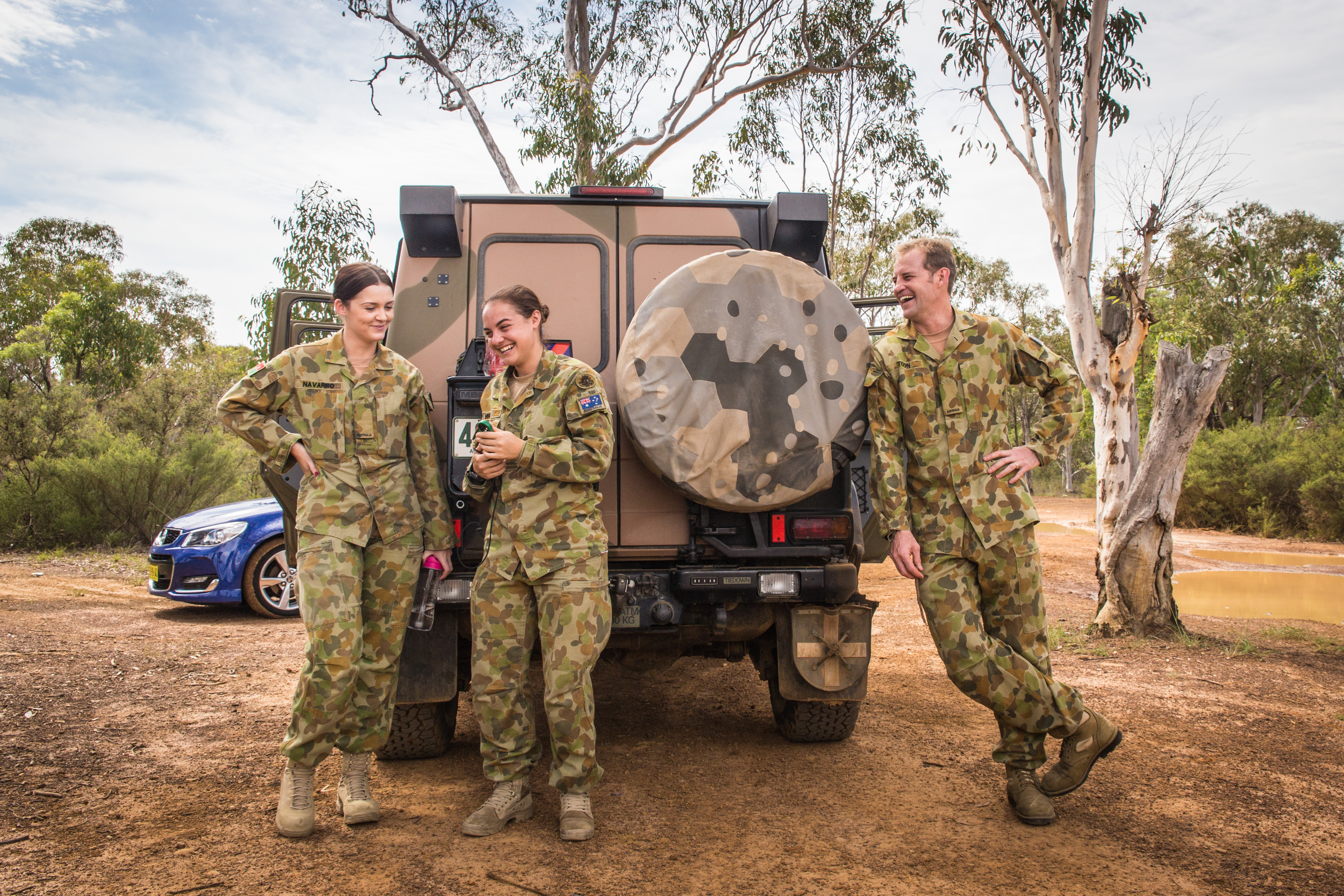
Female and male soldiers wearing DPCU in 2017

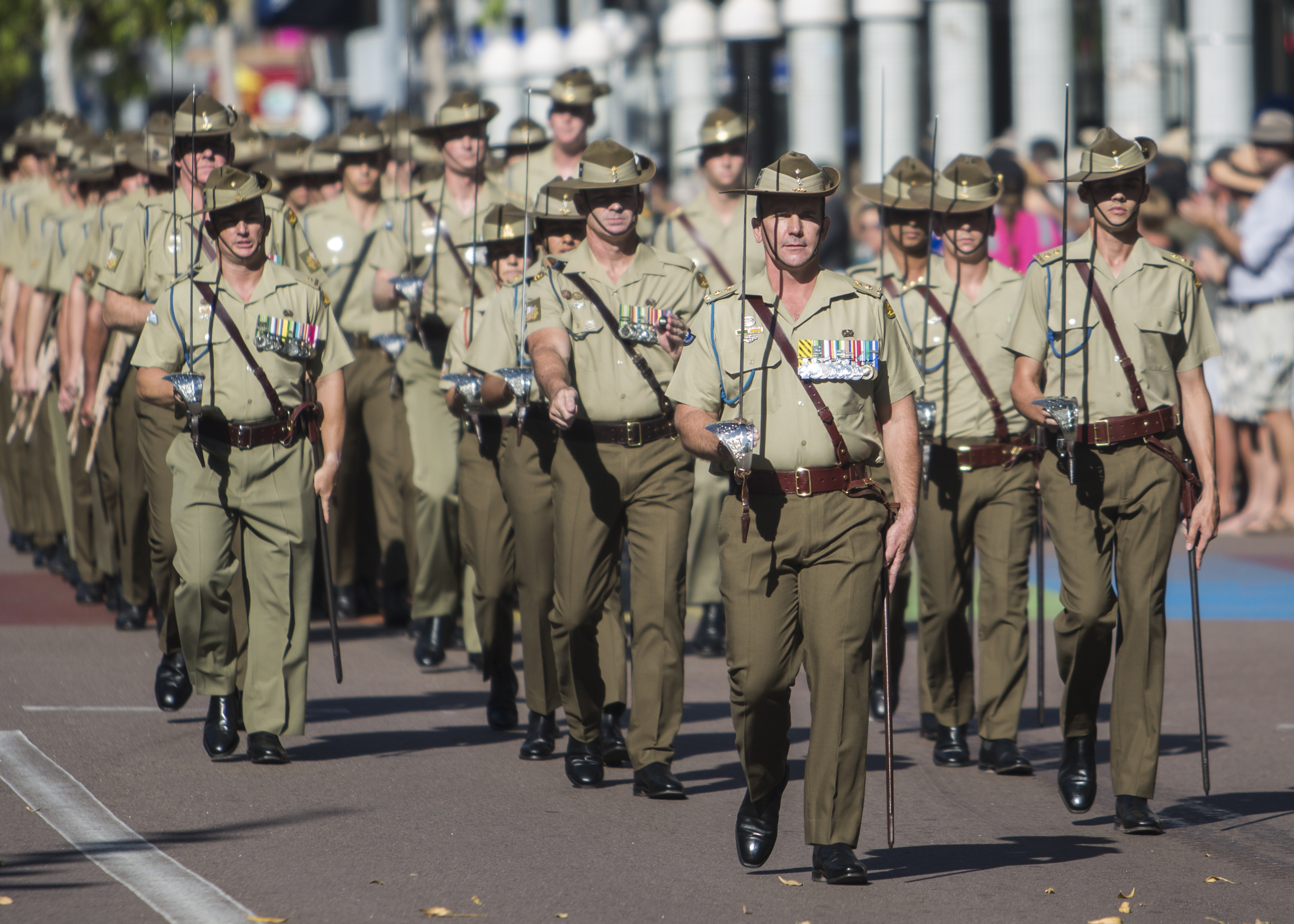
Soldiers on Anzac Day in Darwin, Northern Territory, 2018

== See also ==
- Australian Defence Force ranks
- Australian Army officer rank insignia
- Australian Army enlisted rank insignia
