= Universal Camouflage Pattern =

United States Army pattern (2005–2019)

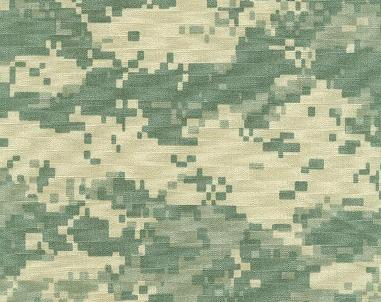
- A sample of the UCP pattern
- Type: Military camouflage pattern
- Place of origin: United States

Service history
- In service: 2005–2019 (U.S. Army) (Note: Some limited usage from 2004 to 2005 for prototype testing.) (Note: Discontinued on uniforms in 2019, now only remains in service in limited capacities such as on some cold weather equipment, overgear, and older body armor.)
- Used by: State Defense Forces; See Users for non-U.S. users
- Wars: (In U.S. service): War in Afghanistan; Iraq War; Operation Inherent Resolve (In Non-U.S. service): Mexican drug war Insurgency in Northern Chad; Second Nagorno-Karabakh War; Syrian civil war Yemeni civil war Myanmar civil war Russo-Ukrainian War: Russian invasion of Ukraine

Production history
- Designed: 2004
- Produced: 2004–present
- Variants: Universal Camouflage Pattern Delta (UCP–D)

Specifications
- Height: 36 in. (Note: +1.25”, -2.5” inch; exactly 1 yard (with some tolerance)) (91.44 cm) (Note: +3.175, -6.35 cm) repeat

The Universal Camouflage Pattern (UCP) is a digital camouflage pattern formerly used by the United States Army in their Army Combat Uniform.

Laboratory and field tests from 2002 to 2004 showed a pattern named "All-Over Brush" to provide the best concealment of the patterns tested. At the end of the trials, Desert Brush was selected as the winner over 12 other experimental patterns. (Note: Desert Brush won over (12) other experimental pattern schemes' terrain categories. List of competing camouflage patterns by scheme (Brush, Track, etc) in terrain categories (Woodland, Desert, Urban, & Desert-Urban), not including Phase III's universal shift. Desert terrain iterations of Brush are more effective universally than the following terrain categories: Shadowline (1)Woodland (2)Desert (3)Urban (4)Desert-Urban Brush (5)Woodland I-II (X)not Desert I-III, it won (including Desert Brush Mod) (6)Urban I (7)Desert-Urban I Track (8)Woodland I-III (including Woodland Track Mod) (9)Desert I-II (10)Urban I, II, & IIIA/B (including Light/Dark Urban Track Mod) (11)Desert-Urban I-II Scorpion (12)Transitional/Multi-Environment I-II (aka Scorpion 'Unmod' and Scorpion Mod, also Scorpion W1) – (dugas.ppt slides 7, 14,15, 19)) (Note: Desert Brush II won over (15) other colorways of camouflage patterns. List of competing camouflage patterns by each colorway Desert Brush beat the following camouflage pattern colorways: Shadowline (1)Woodland (2)Desert (3)Urban (4)Desert-Urban Brush (5)Woodland I-II (X)not Desert I-II, it won (6)Desert III – Desert Brush Mod (7)Urban I (8)Desert-Urban I Track (9)Woodland I-II (10)Woodland III – Woodland Track Mod (11)Desert I-II (12)Urban I-II (13)Urban IIIA/B – Light & Dark Mod Urban Track (both look very similar) (14)Desert-Urban I-II Scorpion (15)Transitional/Multi-Environment I-II(mod vs unmod also look very similar) – (dugas.ppt slides 7, 14,15, 19)) (Note: Desert Brush II won over (19) other standard and experimental camouflage patterns (in colorways). (Or, 20 w/ experimental Urban MARPAT, 19 without it.) List of standard and competing camouflage patterns by each colorway Desert Brush beat the following camouflage pattern colorways: Shadowline (1)Woodland (2)Desert (3)Urban (4)Desert-Urban Brush (5)Woodland I-II (X)not Desert I-II, it won (6)Desert III – Desert Brush Mod (7)Urban I (8)Desert-Urban I Track (9)Woodland I-II (10)Woodland III – Woodland Track Mod (11)Desert I-II (12)Urban I-II (13)Urban IIIA/B – Light & Dark Mod Urban Track (both look very similar) (14)Desert-Urban I-II Scorpion (15)Transitional/Multi-Environment I-II(mod vs unmod also look very similar) Standard (16)US Woodlands (17)Tricolor Desert (18)MARPAT Woodland (19)MARPAT Desert (? 20)MARPAT Urban – (dugas.ppt slides 7, 14,15, 19)) The winning Desert Brush pattern was not used as the final Universal pattern. Instead, U.S. Army leadership utilized pixelated patterns of Canadian CADPAT and U.S. Marine Corps MARPAT, then recolored them based on three universal colors developed in the Army's 2002 to 2004 tests, to be called UCP with significantly less disruptive capability than either of its prior familial patterns. The final UCP was then adopted without field testing against other patterns.

Soldiers serving in Iraq and Afghanistan questioned the UCP's effectiveness as a concealment method. Some felt that it was endangering their missions and their lives. In response, the U.S. Army conducted several studies to find a modification or replacement for the standard issue pattern. In July 2014, the Army announced that Operational Camouflage Pattern would replace all UCP-patterned ACU uniforms by the end of September 2019. However, UCP remains in service in limited capacities, such as on some cold weather overgear and older body armor.

== Selection ==
From May 2001 to June 2004, the U.S. Army universal camouflage trials were held, first to test terrain-specific patterns for woodland, desert, urban and desert urban environments, and later to develop a pattern that would mask the wearer in all environments.

=== Development ===
In 2002, three patterns were developed, called All-Over Brush, Track, and Shadowline. For each pattern, there were four color combinations, which corresponded to a specific type of terrain, however, all four patterns used tan as their base color.

There were 15 evaluations total, which took place at locations across the contiguous United States.

=== Phase I ===
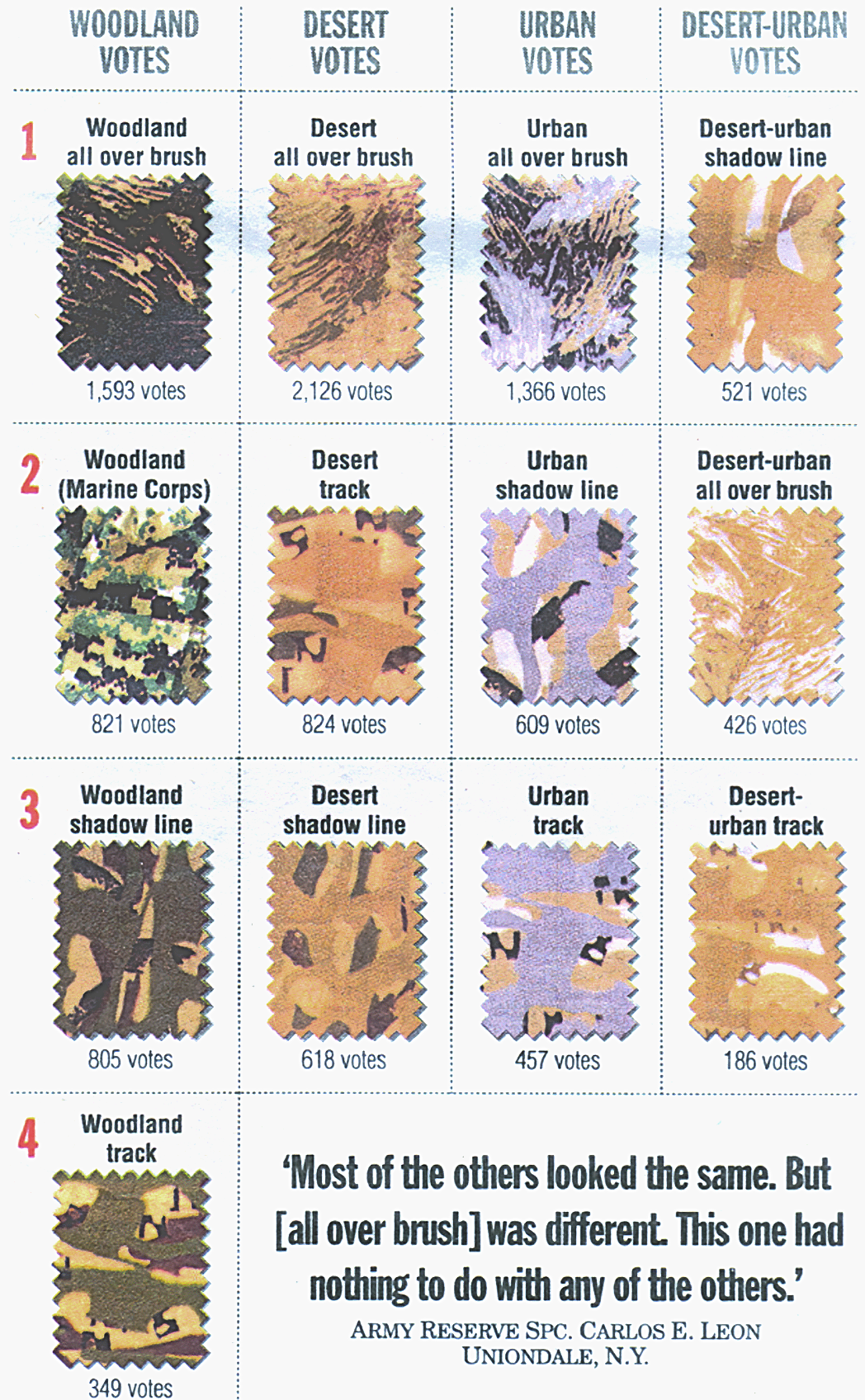
The results of 2002 Army Times poll illustrating the patterns tested in phase I.

In late 2002, the camouflage patterns were rated on their blending, brightness, contrast, and detection by U.S. Army soldiers in daylight conditions. The samples patterns were prepared using inkjet printing for time-efficiency and cost-effectiveness. However, inkjet dyes are highly visible on near-infrared (NIR) night vision devices, so actual NIR evaluations could not be conducted; instead the colors of the patterns were adjusted to simulate how they would be viewed under NIR (Note: "From Phase I to II, inkjets were printed to incorporate NIR attributes." - (dugas.ppt slide 16 in speaker notes)) For the remainder of the phases, production printing with regular dyes and mechanical rollers were used.

Following phase I testing, the Shadowline pattern was eliminated, along with the urban and desert-urban color ways of All-Over Brush. All four of the Track patterns were accepted along with All-Over Brush's woodland and desert colorways.

=== Phases II and III ===
In 2003, the patterns were then modified and tested alongside a "Contractor-Developed Mod" pattern, Scorpion, developed in conjunction with Crye Precision. Phase II's near-infrared nighttime testing determined that black, medium gray, and medium tan were the only colors that gave acceptable performance. (Note: (dugas.ppt slide 16))

=== Phase IV ===
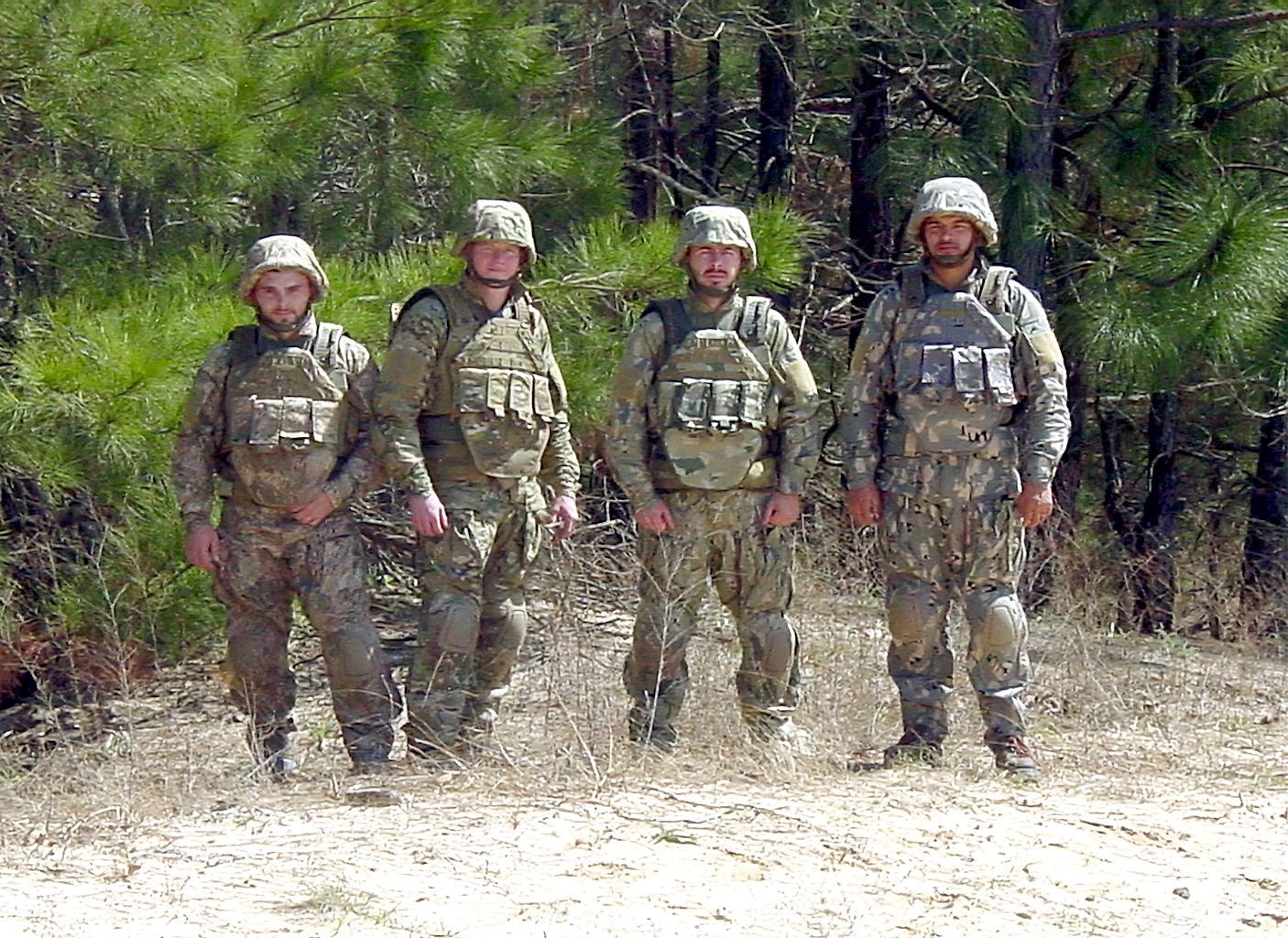
Universal camouflage trials phase four contenders in early 2004. From left to right: Desert All-Over Brush, Scorpion, Woodland Track (modified), and Urban Track

In 2004, all four remaining patterns, Desert Brush, Woodland Track Mod, Scorpion Mod, and Urban Track were then tested alongside each other in two sets of evaluations in woodland, desert, and urban environments. Full Future Force Warrior ensembles were fabricated for testing.

=== Results ===
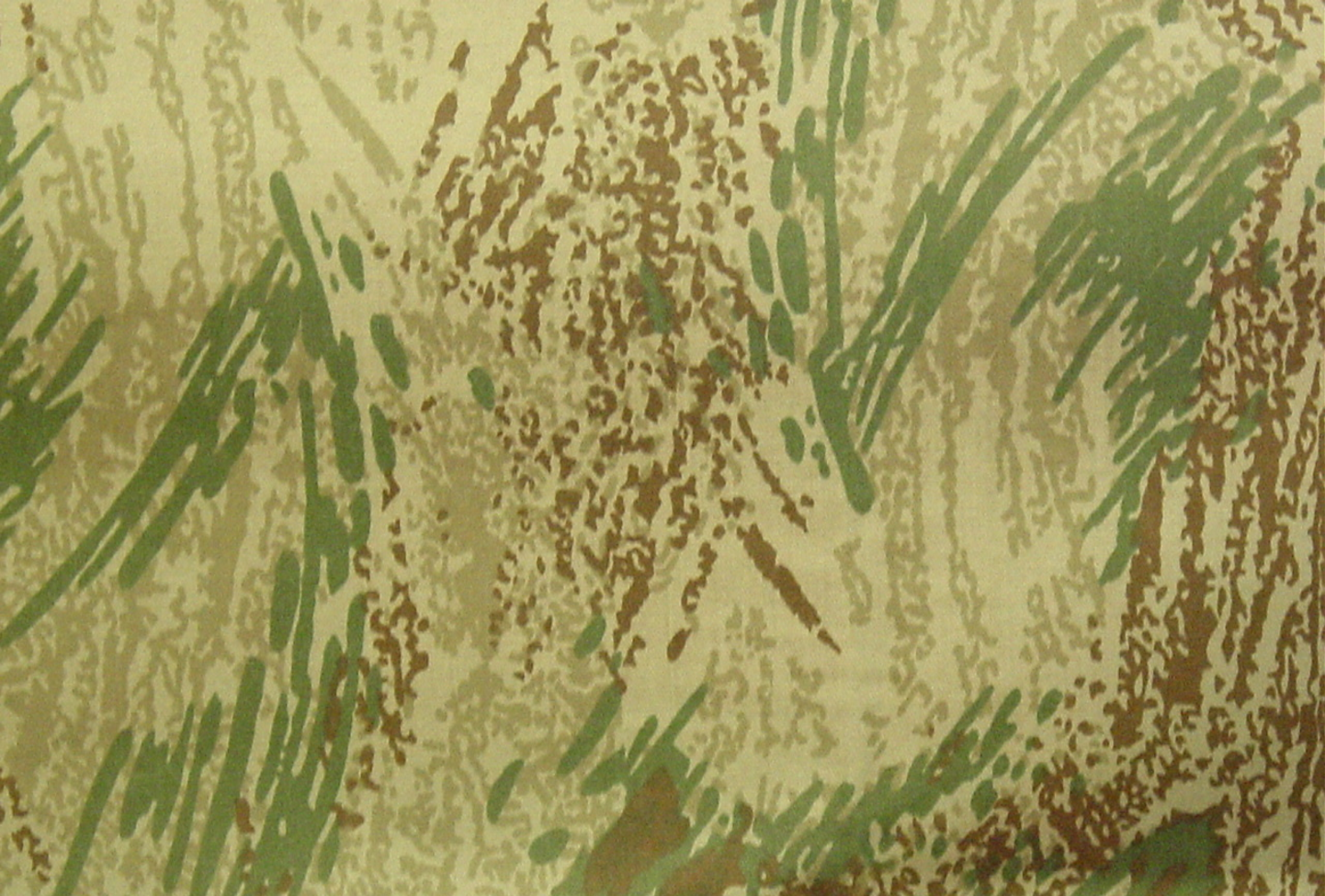
Finalized version of Desert All-Over Brush, which ranked 1st

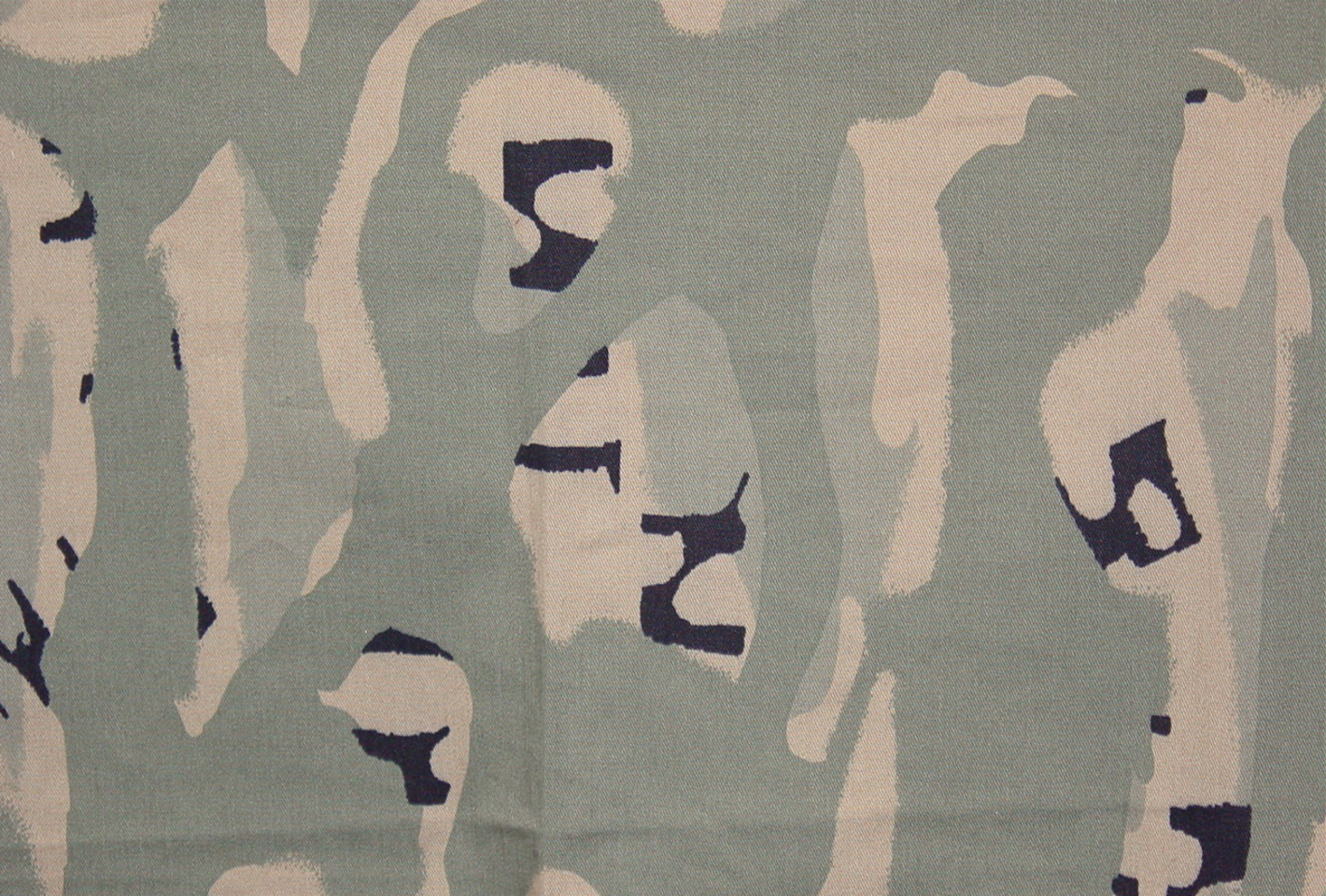
Finalized version of Urban Track which was graded in 4th place

The Desert Brush design received the best overall mean daytime visual rating. The Scorpion pattern received highest rating in woodland environments, but lower ratings in desert and urban environments. Urban Track was generally the 3rd or 4th ranked performer at each site, but was the best performer in nighttime environments. Infrared testing showed negligible differences in the performance of the four patterns. Natick rated the patterns from best to worst as: Desert Brush, Woodland Track Mod, Contractor-Developed Mod (Scorpion), and Urban Track.

== Color selection ==
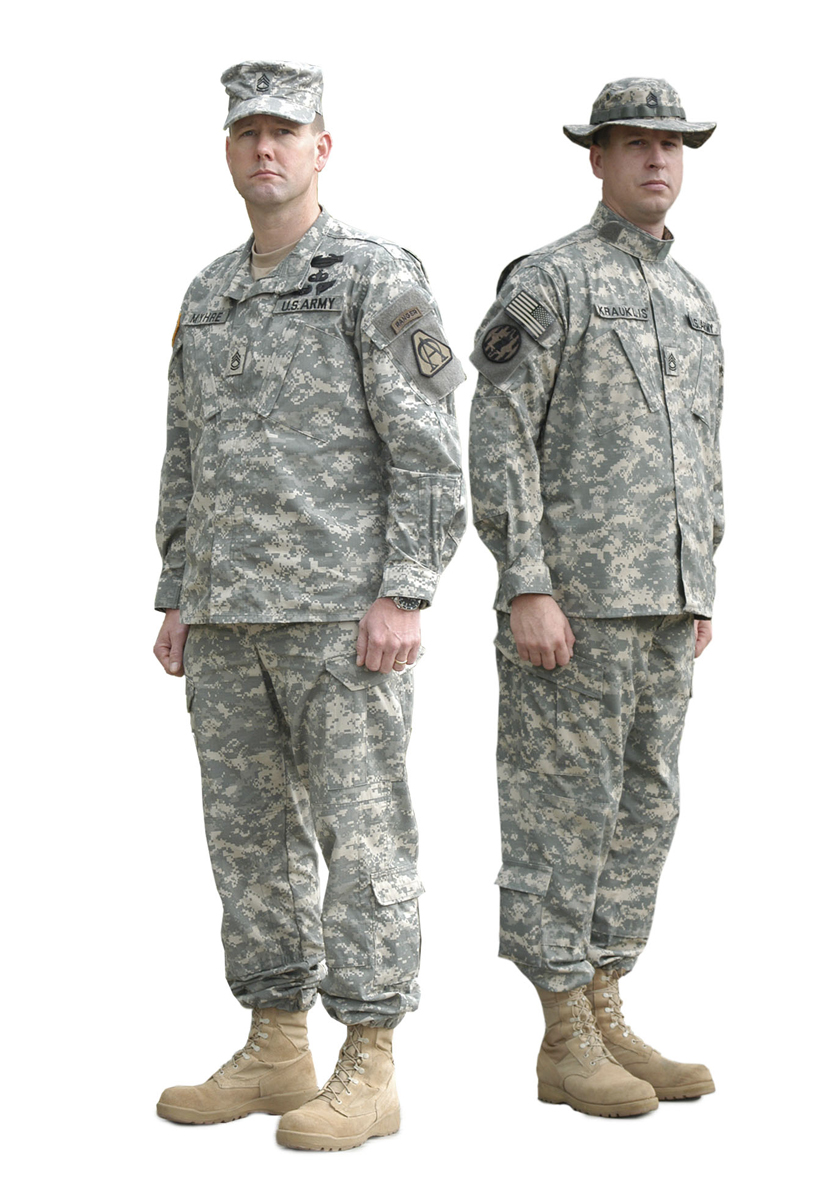
Two soldiers in 2005 wearing the Army Combat Uniform in the Universal Camouflage Pattern

The color scheme of the UCP is composed of tan, gray, and sage green (officially named Desert Sand 500, Urban Gray 501, and Foliage Green 502). The pattern is notable for its elimination of the color black. Justification given for the omission of black was that black is a color not commonly found in nature. Pure black viewed through night vision goggles can appear extremely dark and create an undesirable high-contrast image.

== Controversy ==
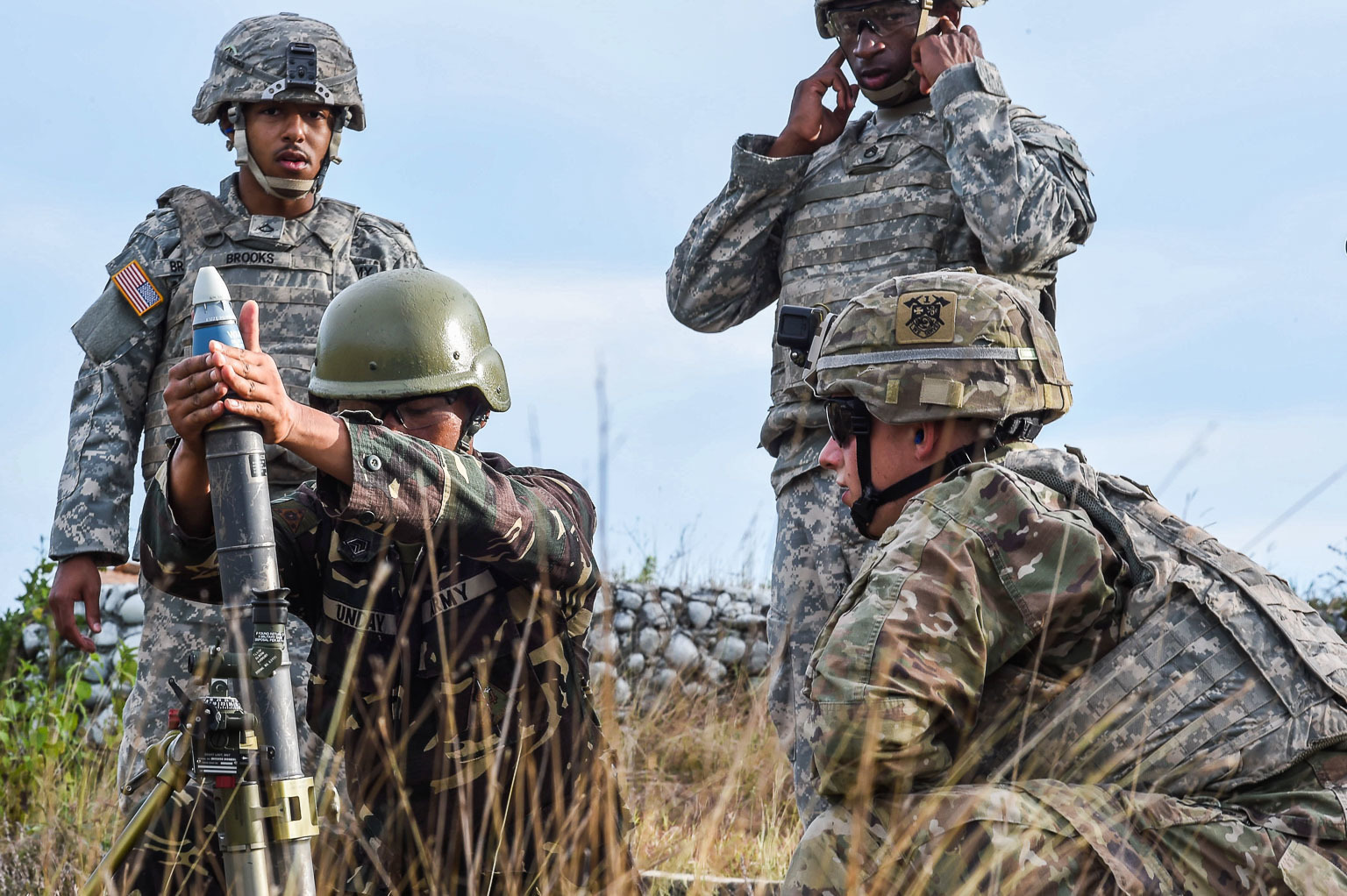
U.S. soldiers in May 2017 wearing the ACU in UCP

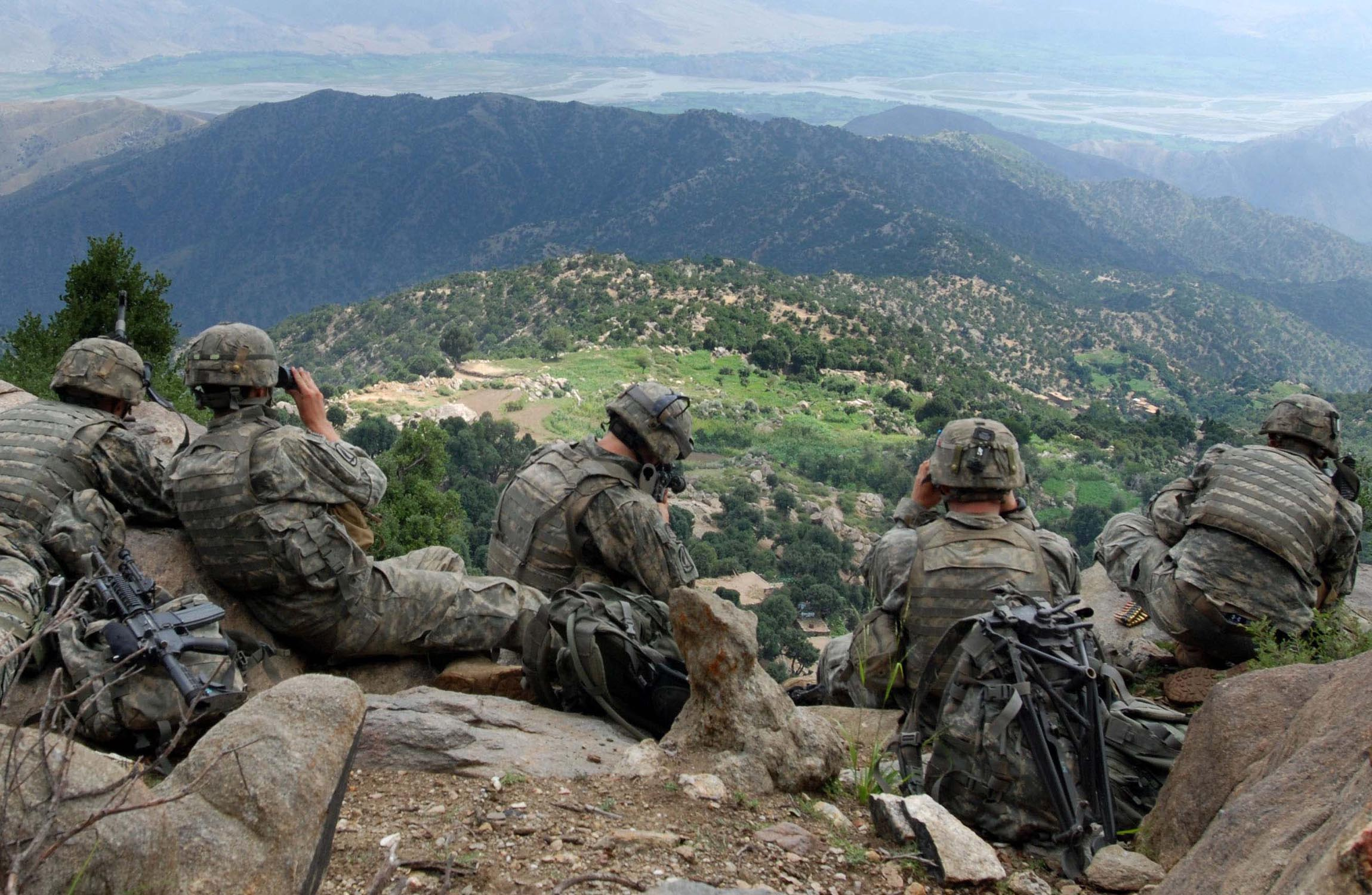
U.S. Army soldiers in May 2006, wearing the Universal Camouflage Pattern in Kunar Province, Afghanistan

The U.S. Army incorrectly reported to the media that the basis for the UCP was the Urban Track pattern, which had been modified through the removal of black from the pattern and pixelated and then reverted in the interest of effectiveness. Pattern comparisons subsequently established that the information provided by the U.S. Army was incorrect, and that the pattern was simply a three-colored version of MARPAT, a derivative of the Canadian CADPAT scheme. No evidence has been presented by the U.S. Army that the new UCP pattern had undergone proper field testing. In later tests conducted by the Natick Soldier Center, results indicated that UCP did not fare well against other multi-environment patterns.

Following building criticism of the poor effectiveness of the pattern in most terrains in the Afghan and Middle Eastern theaters of operations, the use of the pattern was discussed within the U.S. Congress. A bill passed by Congress in 2009 ordered the Department of Defense to "take immediate action to provide combat uniforms to personnel deployed to Afghanistan with a camouflage pattern that is suited to the environment of Afghanistan."

In the interim, the Army conducted a brief in-country test of replacements for use in Afghanistan that included "UCP Delta", a variant of UCP that added coyote brown and was tested with the 4th Infantry and 82nd Airborne Divisions, and the commercial pattern MultiCam, which had been created by Crye Associates and was based on their original Scorpion pattern from 2002. MultiCam was quickly selected and issued to all troops deployed to Afghanistan.

== Replacement ==
In 2014, the United States Army announced the replacement of UCP. On 31 July 2014, the Army formally announced that a modified version of the original Scorpion pattern, Scorpion W2, had been chosen as the new Operational Camouflage Pattern (OCP), which would begin being issued on uniforms in summer 2015. Authorization of UCP uniforms ended on 1 October 2019, though still sees some limited usage on other gear such as some body armor and cold weather overgear.

As the Army began phasing out UCP, many state defense forces began adopting it as their uniform.

== Users ==
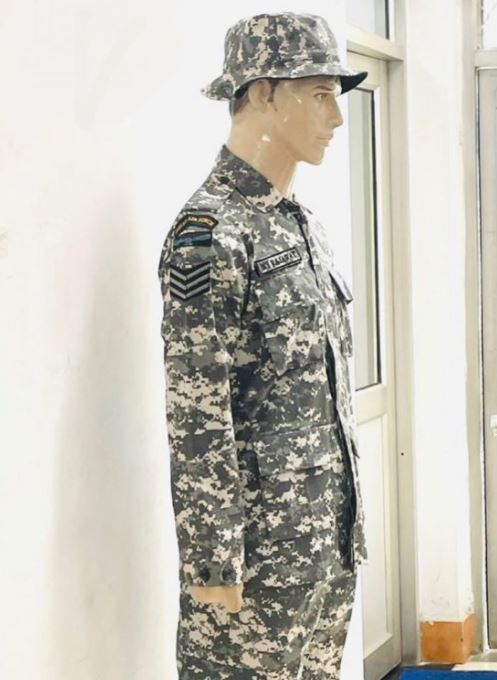
Indian Air Force camouflage uniform adopted in 2022

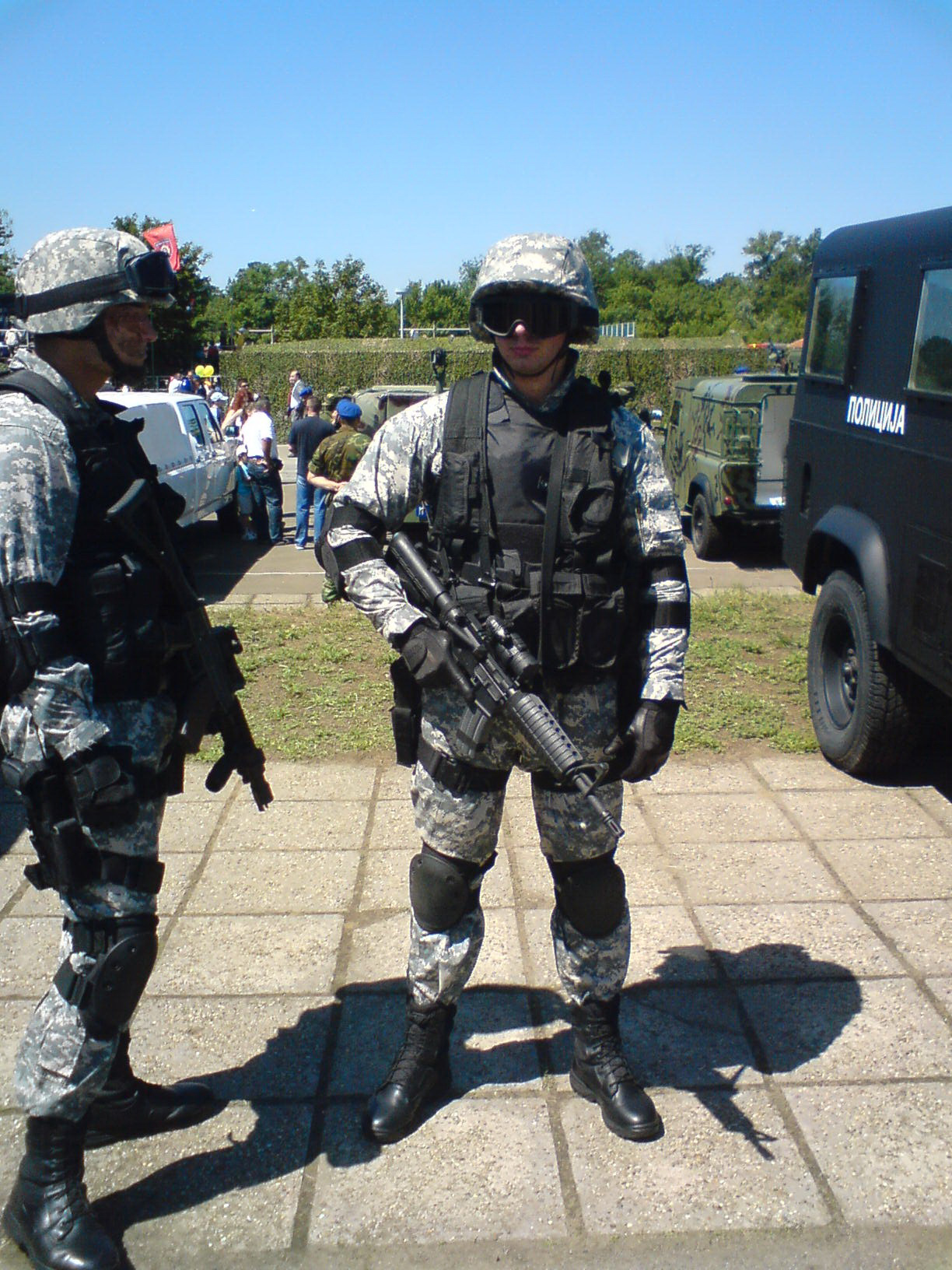
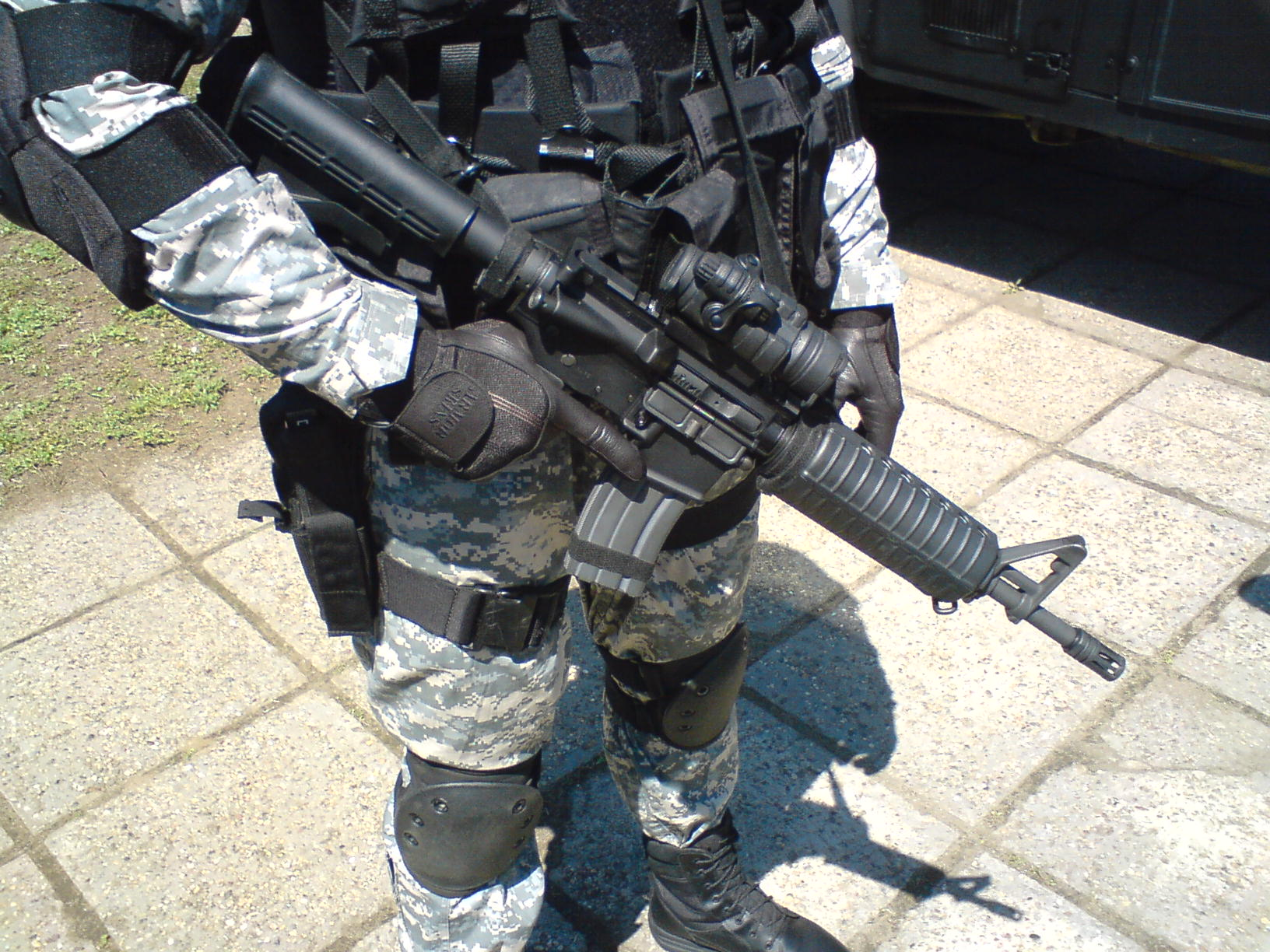
Serbian gendarmes wearing UCP-patterned BDUs

=== Current ===
- Afghanistan: Used by Taliban and Afghan military forces after being captured from Republic of Afghanistan troops.
- Argentina: Used by the Grupo Especial Uno.
- Azerbaijan: Used by the Azeri Ministry of Interior's Kobra Special Group.
- Bolivia: Regular UCP used by the Bolivian Police's UTARC and GICE units; dark UCP used by the UTOP.
- Bosnia and Herzegovina
- Chad: UCP clones used by some Chadian commando units and by Chadian Gendarmerie anti-poaching units.
- Chile: Used by the Chilean Air Force as uniform for airmen.
- Cyprus: Used by Cypriot special forces.
- Hungary: Used by Counter-Terrorism Center operators.
- India: Used for urban operations only by MARCOS commandos and Paras. The Indian Air Force adopted a similar pattern in 2022.
- Iran: UCP clones used by the Islamic Republic of Iran Navy Marine Command and some Basiji special operations forces.
- Kazakhstan: Worn by special forces unit of the National Guard of Kazakhstan.
- Lebanon: Lebanese Marine Commandos use both local copies and surplus UCP ACU uniforms from U.S. Army.
- Malaysia: Supplied and used by the Special Task and Rescue unit.
- Mexico: Used by the Sinaloa State Police's Special Anti-Kidnapping Unit.
- Montenegro: Used by the Montenegrin Special Anti-Terrorist Unit.
- Moldova: Known to be used by operators of the Posebna Jedinica Policije.
- North Macedonia: Used by the Rapid Deployment Unit.
- Paraguay: Used by Paraguayan National Police's Grupo Lince unit with dark colored palettes.
- Peru
- Saudi Arabia: Used by Royal Saudi Air Force personnel, which has a darker color palette.
- Serbia: Used by the Serbian Special Anti–Terrorist Unit only in operations inside cities/towns with UCP-patterned BDUs. Also used by the Gendarmery.
- Tajikistan
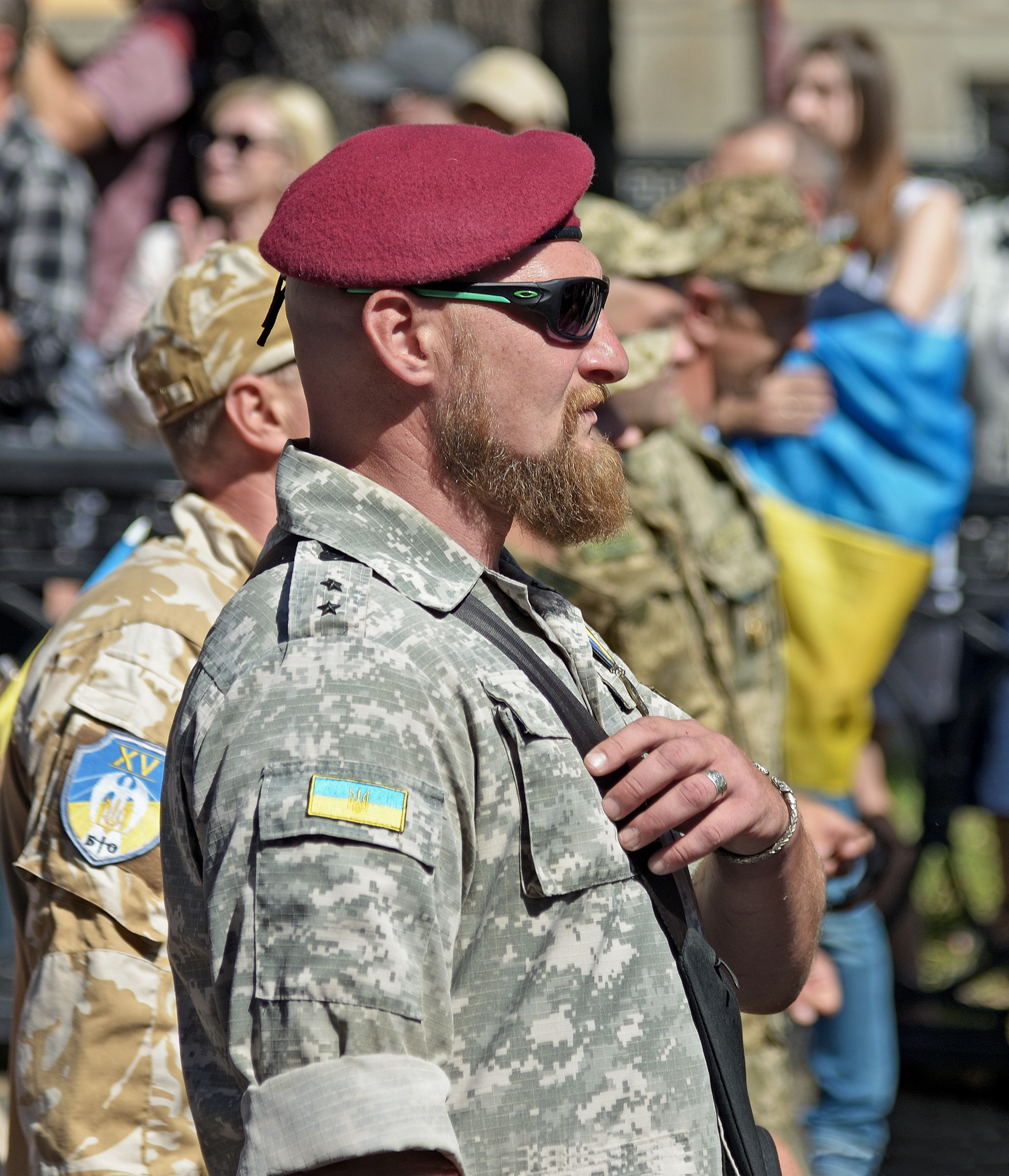
- Territorial defense battalion veteran wearing UCP at the March of Ukraine's Defenders on Independence Day in Kyiv, 2019
  Ukraine: Used by some units of the Armed Forces of Ukraine from special forces to airborne units.
- United States: Used by multiple State Defense Forces. (Note: Some limited usage from 2004 to 2005 for prototype testing.) (Note: Discontinued on uniforms in 2019, now only remains in service in limited capacities such as on some cold weather equipment, overgear, and older body armor.)

=== Former ===
- South Korea: Was worn by KATUSA units.
- United States: Former standard-issued camouflage of the U.S. Army from 2005 to 2019. (Note: Some limited usage from 2004 to 2005 for prototype testing.) (Note: Discontinued on uniforms in 2019, now only remains in service in limited capacities such as on some cold weather equipment, overgear, and older body armor.)
  - United States Army: Vests, webbing, gear and helmet covers remain in use for training reserves.
  - United States Air Force: Utilized helmet covers, vests, armor, webbing and gear from U.S. Army to collaborate with former Airman Battle Uniform.
  - United States Navy: Uniforms and equipment utilized by Navy individual augmentees attached with Army units.
  - U.S. Department of Energy Office of Environmental Management: Used by members of the Federal Protective Forces

== See also ==
- List of military clothing camouflage patterns

Other CADPAT-derived digital camouflage:

- CADPAT
- MARPAT
- NWU/AOR digital patterns
