= U.S. Army universal camouflage trials =

U.S. Army program to find universally effective camouflage

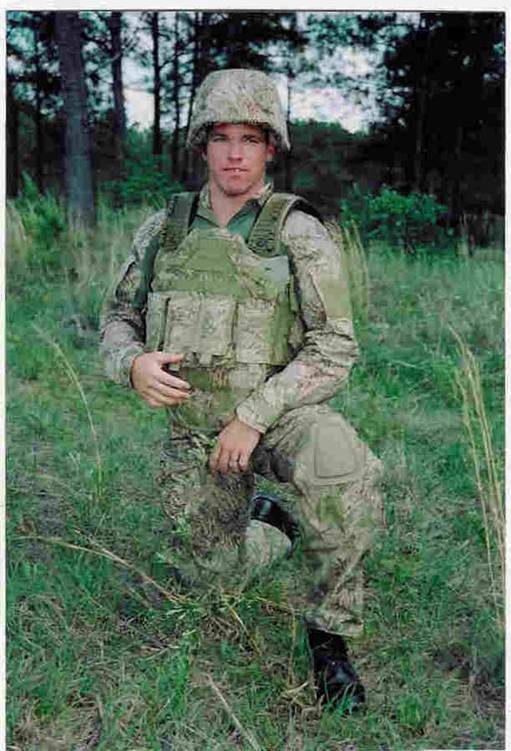
Final variant of Desert All-Over Brush

The U.S. Army universal camouflage trials took place from 2002 to 2004 with the goal of creating a single pattern that would provide adequate concealment in all environments.

Four different patterns in a total of 13 variations were tested during the evaluation: three woodland patterns, three desert, three urban, three desert/urban, and one multi-environment pattern.

The Universal Camouflage Pattern was eventually adopted despite not having been part of the test. Brigadier General James Moran, the director of PEO Soldier, overrode the testing data and directed the adoption of this untested pattern of camouflage.

== Development ==
Six patterns were originally developed in early 2002 and reviewed for effectiveness, with three of the six designs being rejected due to limited effectiveness. The final three patterns were evaluated at the U.S. Army Natick Soldier Center, and four color schemes were created for each pattern. The woodland patterns consisted of tan, green, brown and black; the desert patterns comprised tan, dark tan, khaki and brown; the urban patterns included tan, light gray, medium gray and black, and the desert/urban patterns contained tan, dark tan, light gray and brown. A common ground shade, tan, was selected for all patterns to allow individual equipment to be interchangeable if more than one color scheme were adopted. The patterns were All-Over Brush, Shadowline, Track, and Scorpion, co-developed with contractor Crye Precision. The goal was to develop a single pattern that would perform well in all terrains.

== Patterns ==
=== All-Over Brush ===
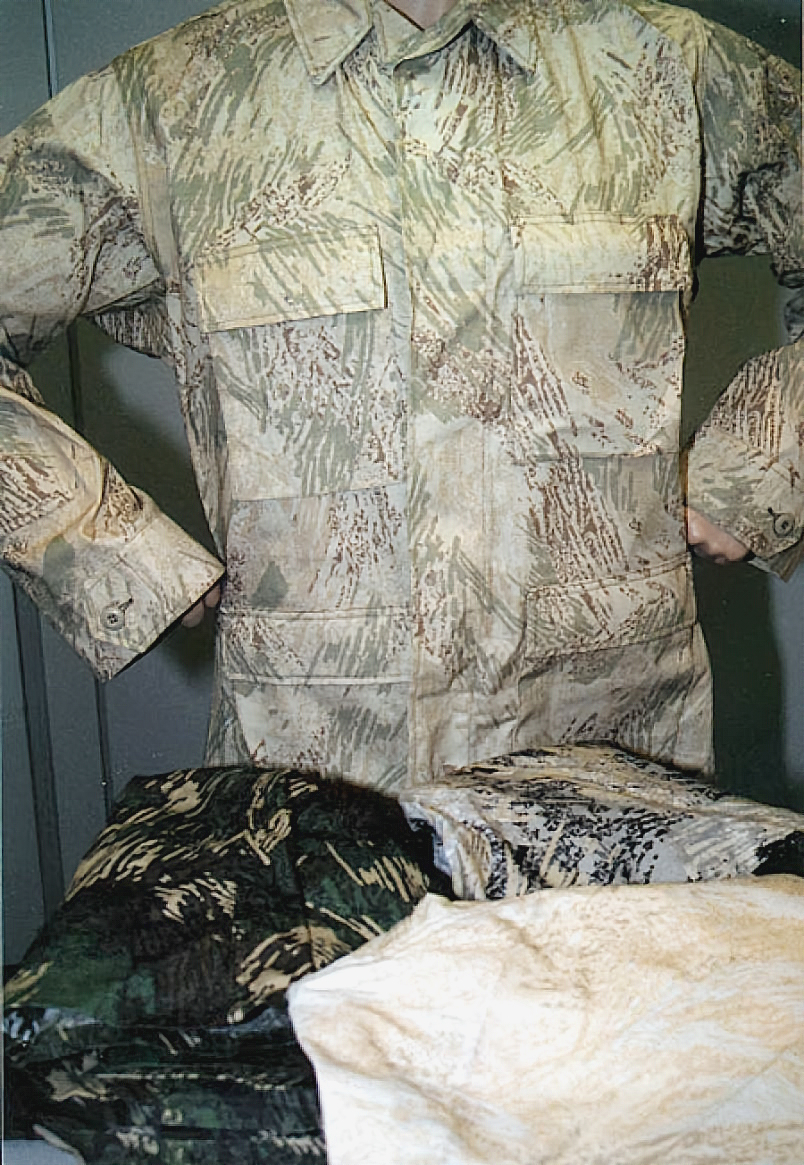
All-Over Brush pattern

All-Over Brush consisted of swirls of colors similar to patches of grass and brush. In a poll from the Army Times in 2002, All-Over Brush was voted the most popular pattern in the woodland, desert, and urban schemes. The urban and desert/urban schemes were eliminated in the first phase of testing, with woodland being eliminated during the second phase of testing. Desert All-Over Brush made it through phase three and four in a modified, more all-environment friendly form.

=== Shadowline ===
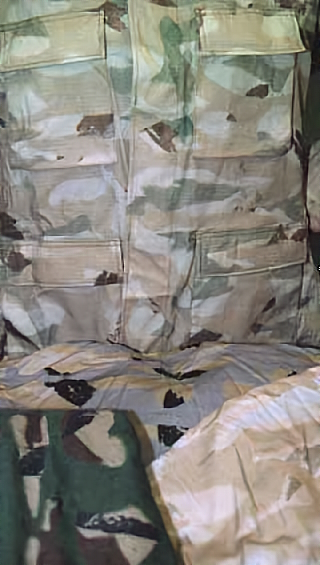
Shadowline pattern

The Shadowline pattern sported horizontal lines with slashes. All four color combinations were eliminated during the first phase of testing.

=== Track ===
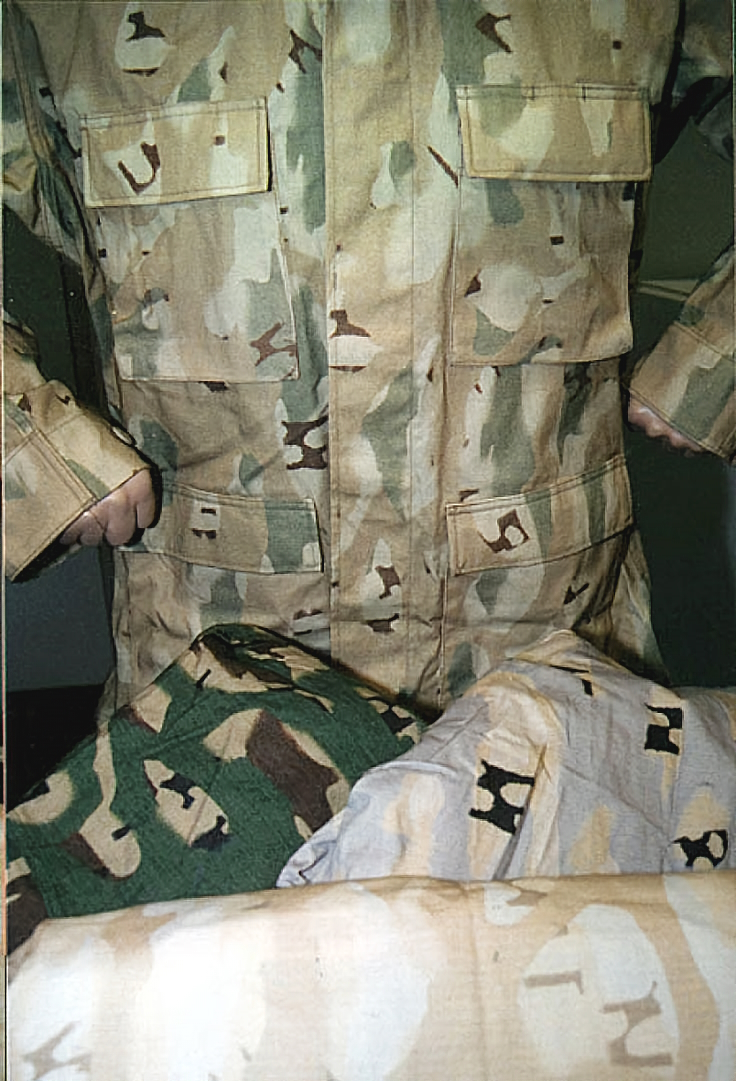
Track pattern

The Track pattern featured vertical lines with small, irregular marks present throughout. All four color combinations made it to phase two of testing, with a modified woodland pattern and modified urban pattern making it through phases three and four.

=== Scorpion ===
Scorpion was developed in conjunction with defense contractor Crye Precision. The pattern consists of six colors with an irregular spread throughout, and was designed to be effective in multiple environments. Following the trials, Crye began producing a slightly altered version for the commercial market as MultiCam.

== Pattern testing ==
Testing occurred in four different phases between August 2002 and March 2004 at Fort Benning, Fort Irwin, Fort Lewis, Fort Polk and the Yakima Training Center. A total of 15 evaluations took place. Trained soldiers rated the patterns based on blending, brightness, contrast and detection. Phase one consisted of only side-by-side daytime testing at distances up to 180 meters (590 ft) with patterns printed by an inkjet printer. Eleven candidates were selected and production printed for phase two of testing, which contained both day and nighttime evaluations at distances no greater than 120 meters (390 ft). Patterns were tested separately in phase two. The modified Desert All-Over Brush, Woodland Track, Urban Track and Scorpion were evaluated in phases three and four. During phase four of testing, the selected patterns were printed on Future Force Warrior ensembles and evaluated from four different angles against woodland, desert and urban backgrounds.

== Testing phase changes ==
=== Phase I (Inkjet Printed) ===
==== All-Over Brush ====
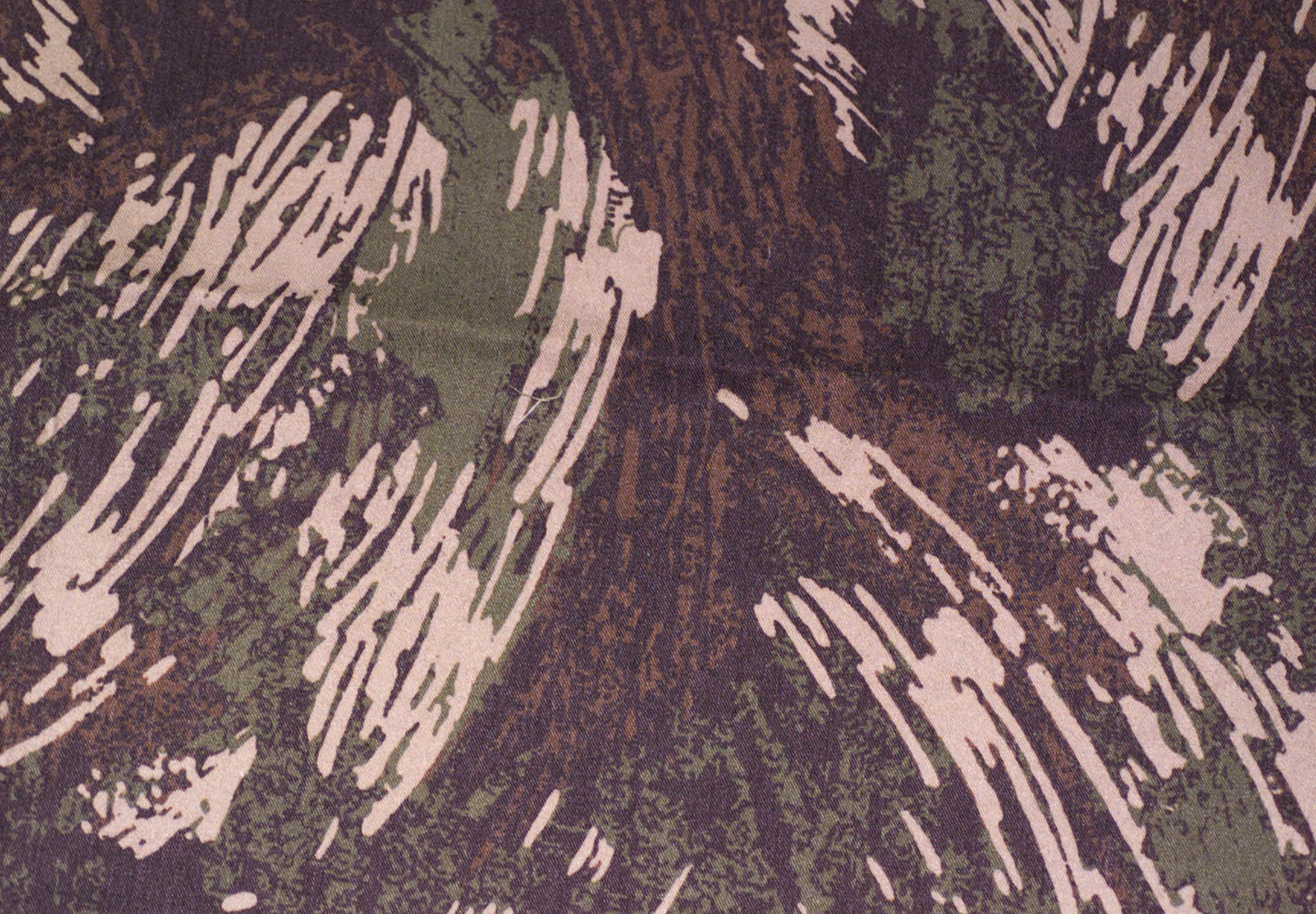
Woodland

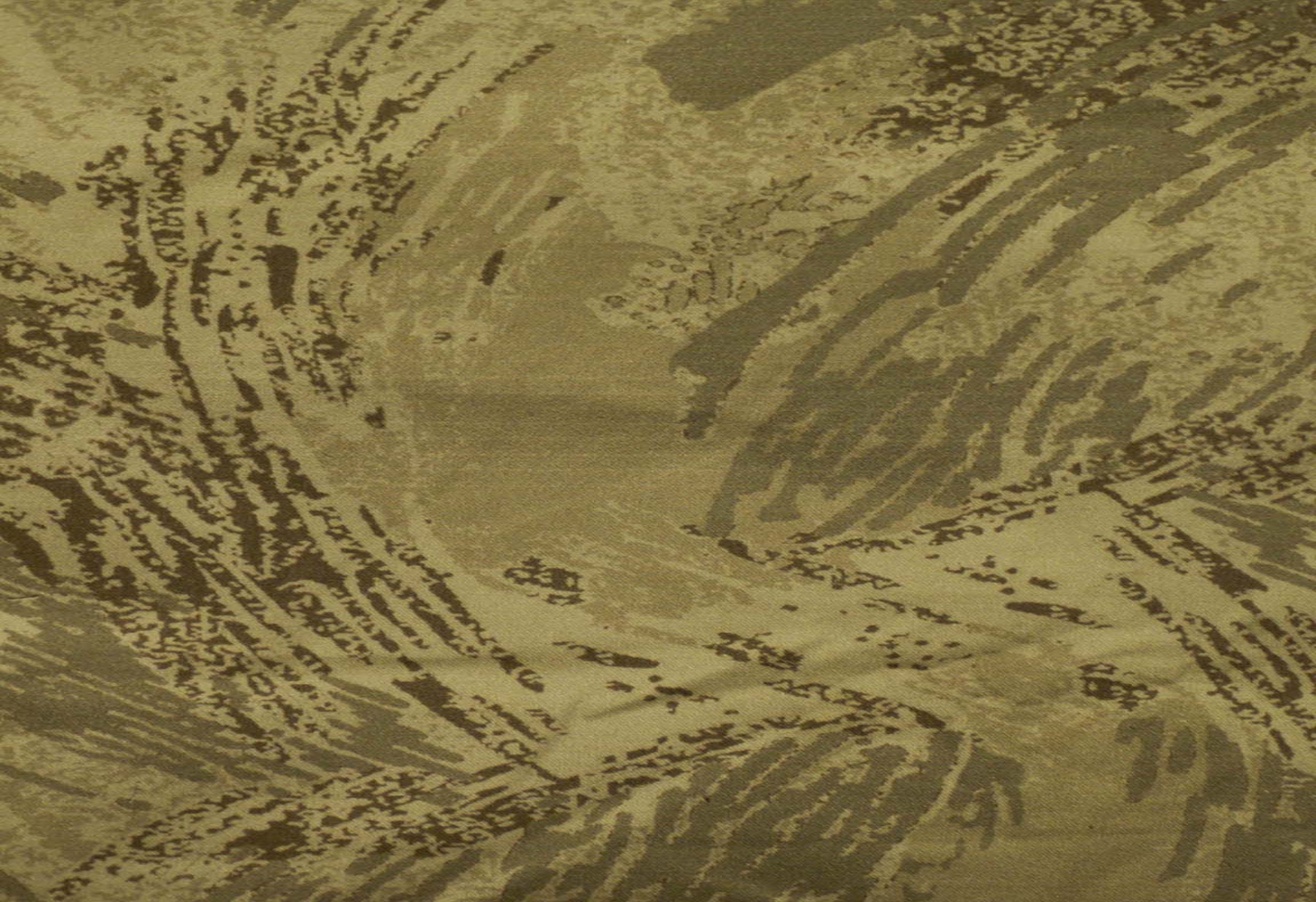
Desert

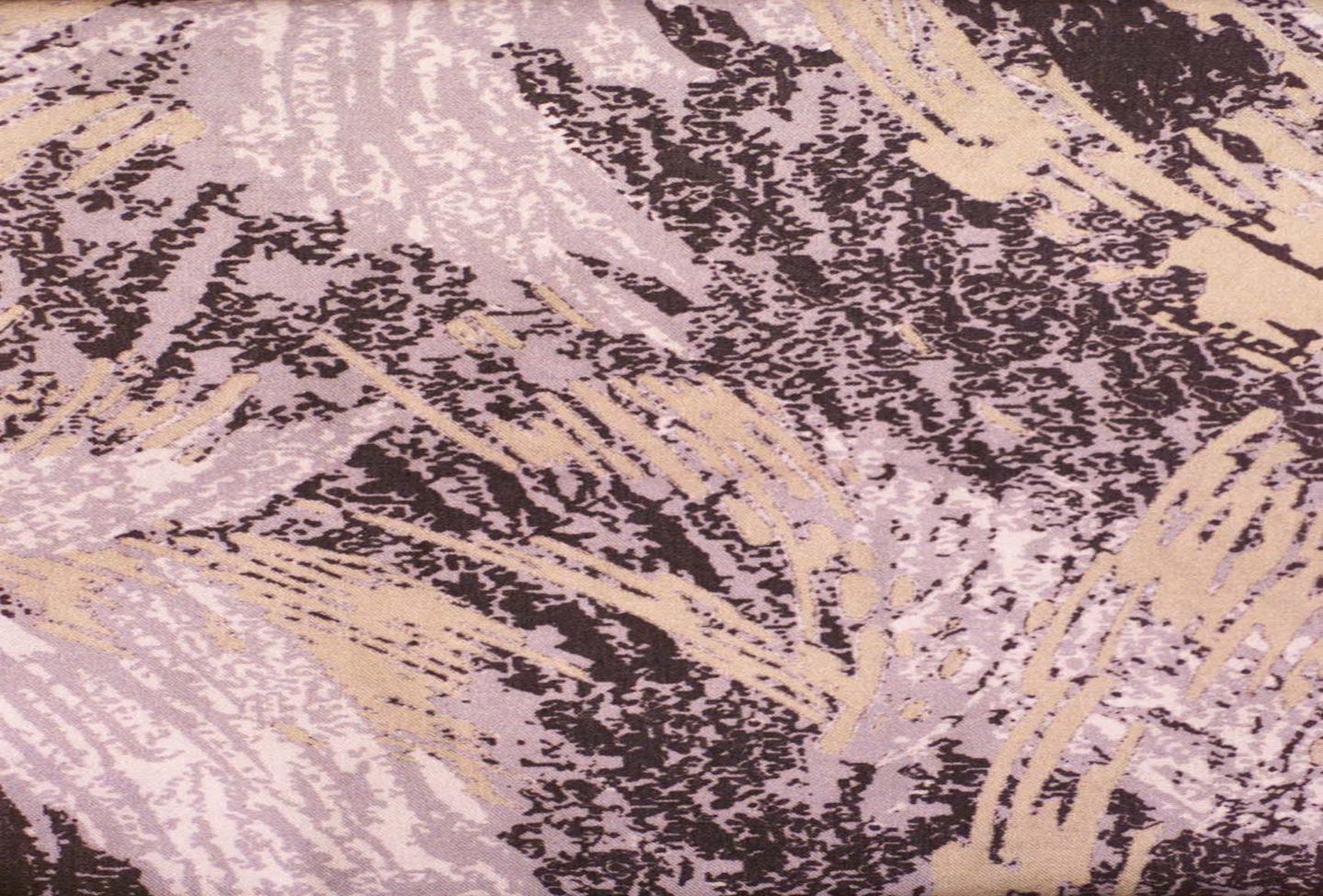
Urban

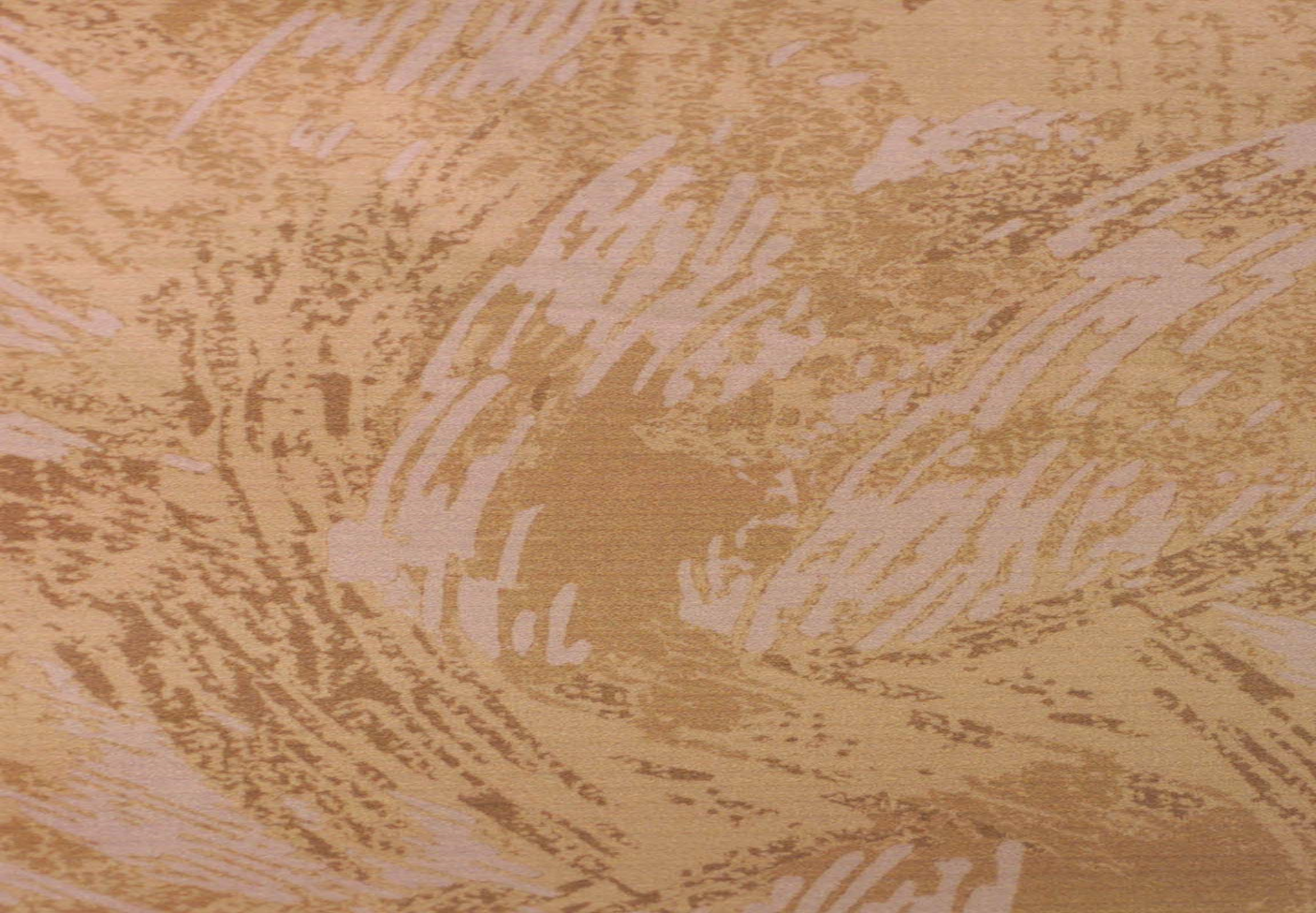
Desert/Urban

==== Track ====
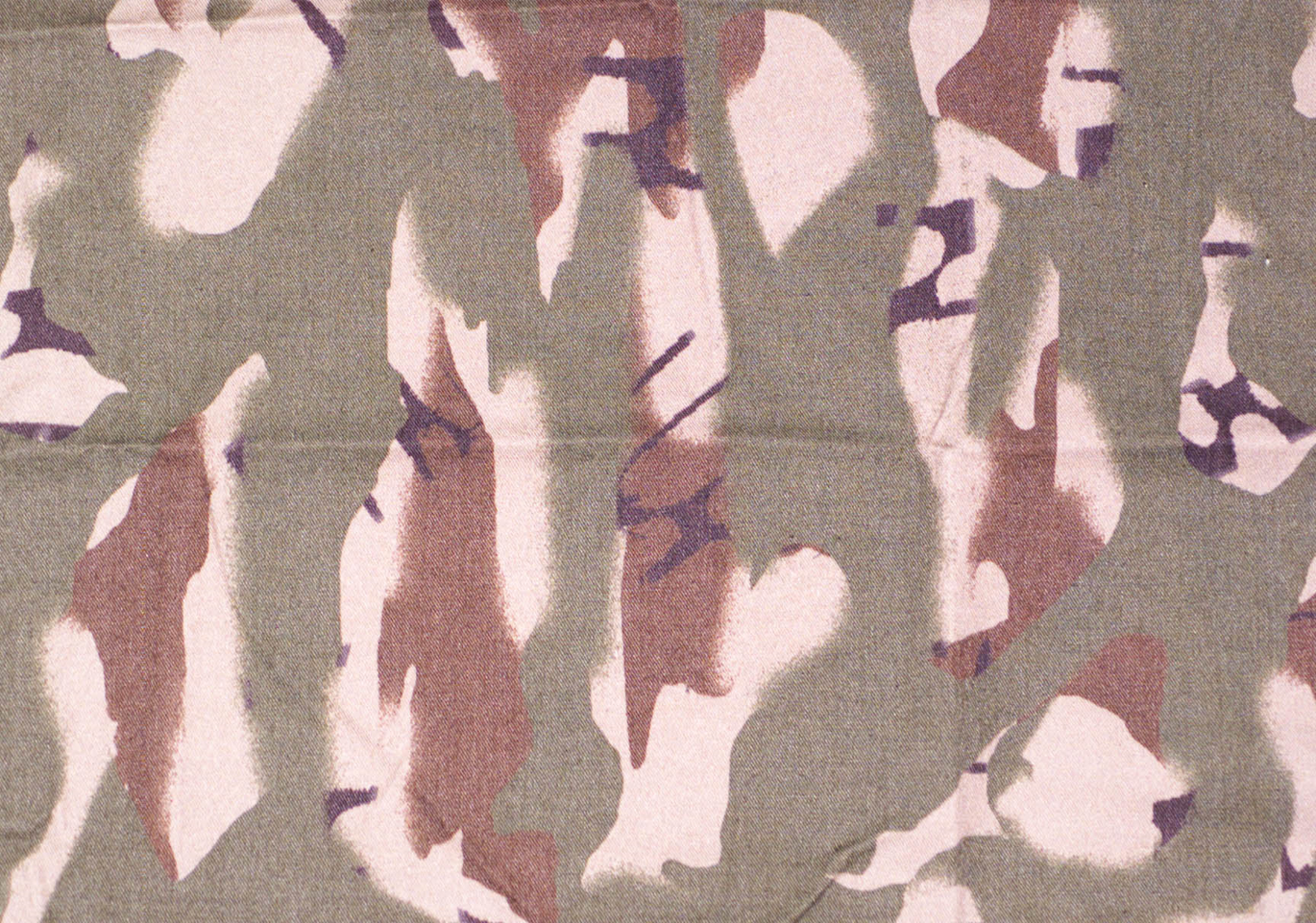
Woodland

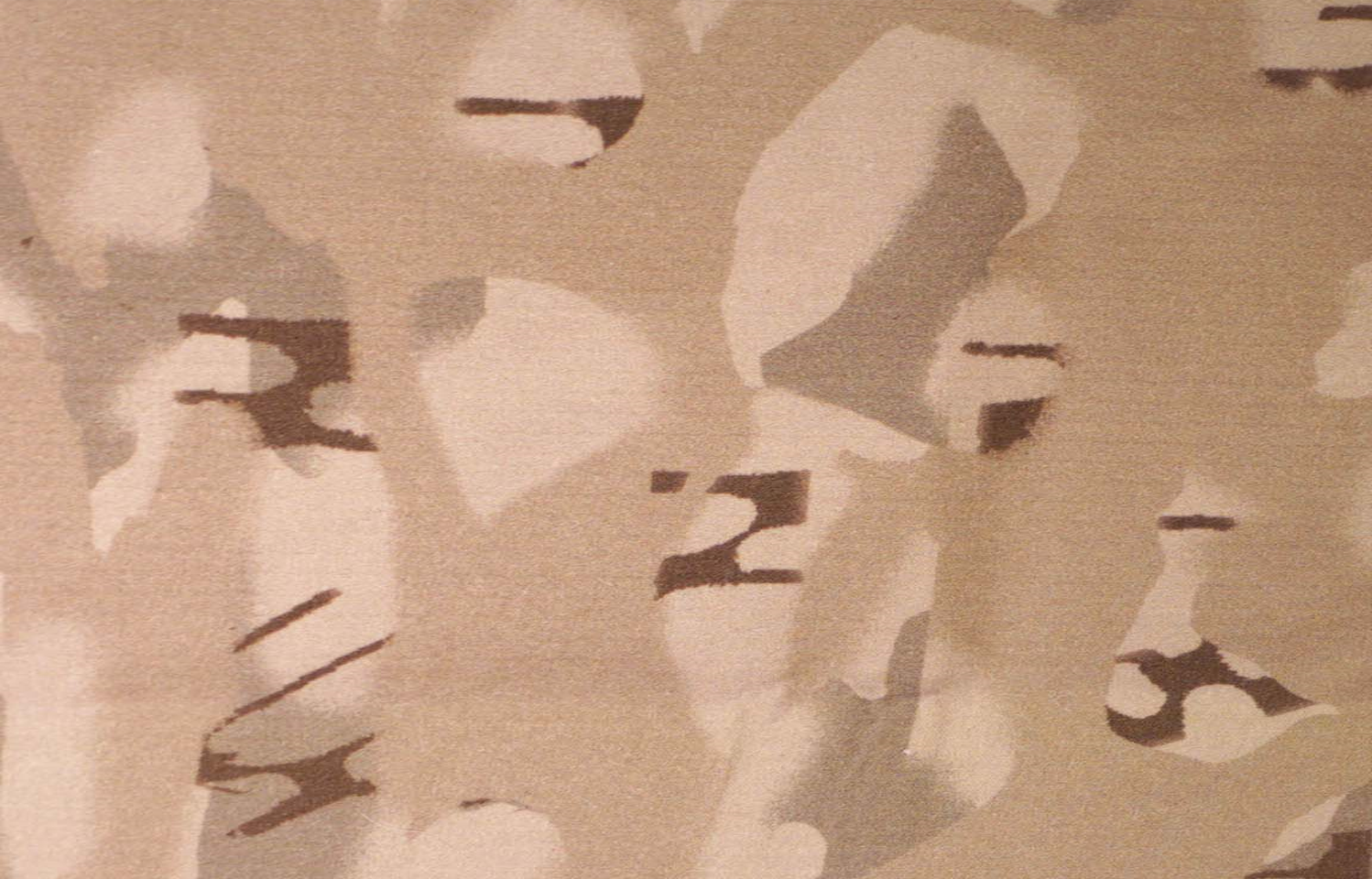
Desert

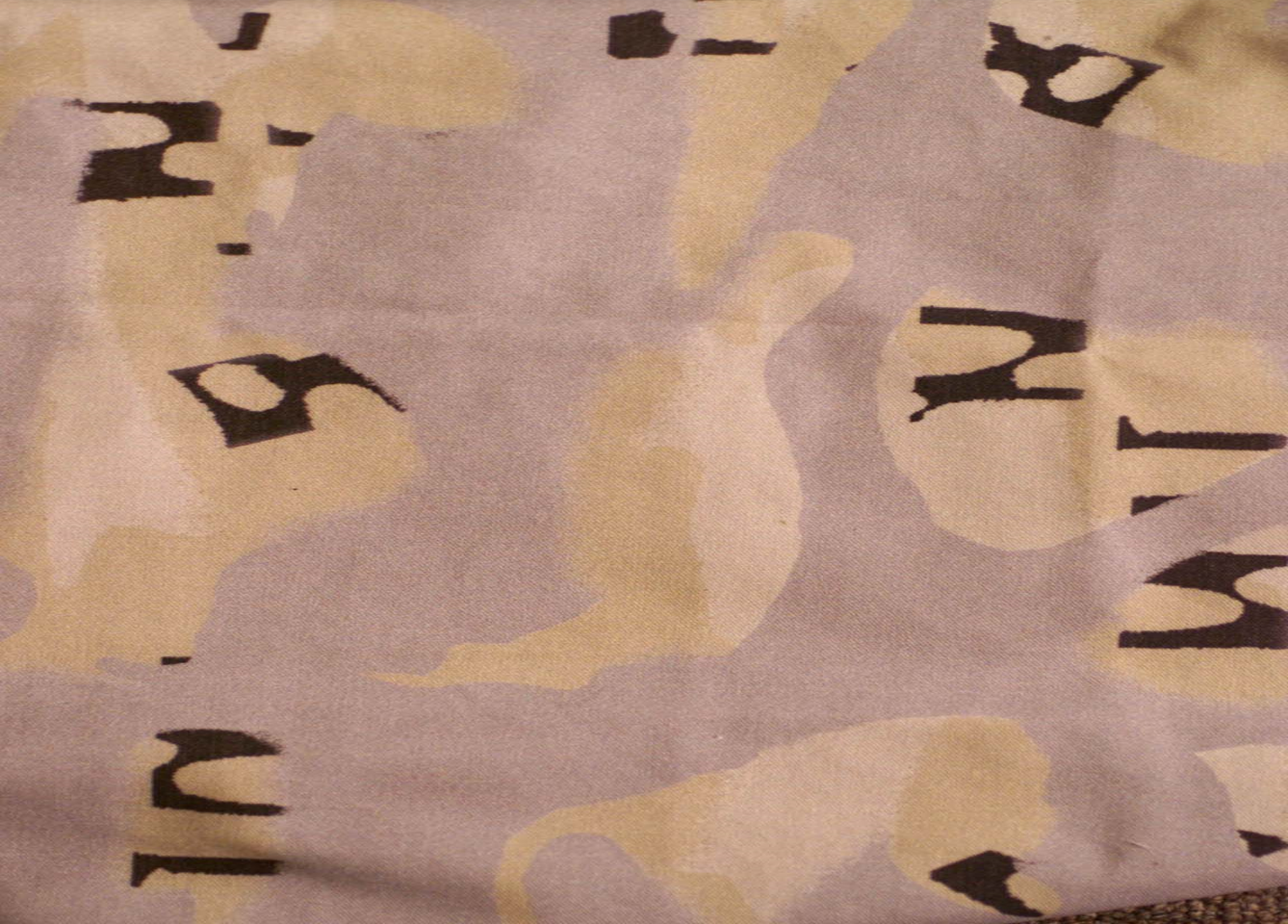
Urban

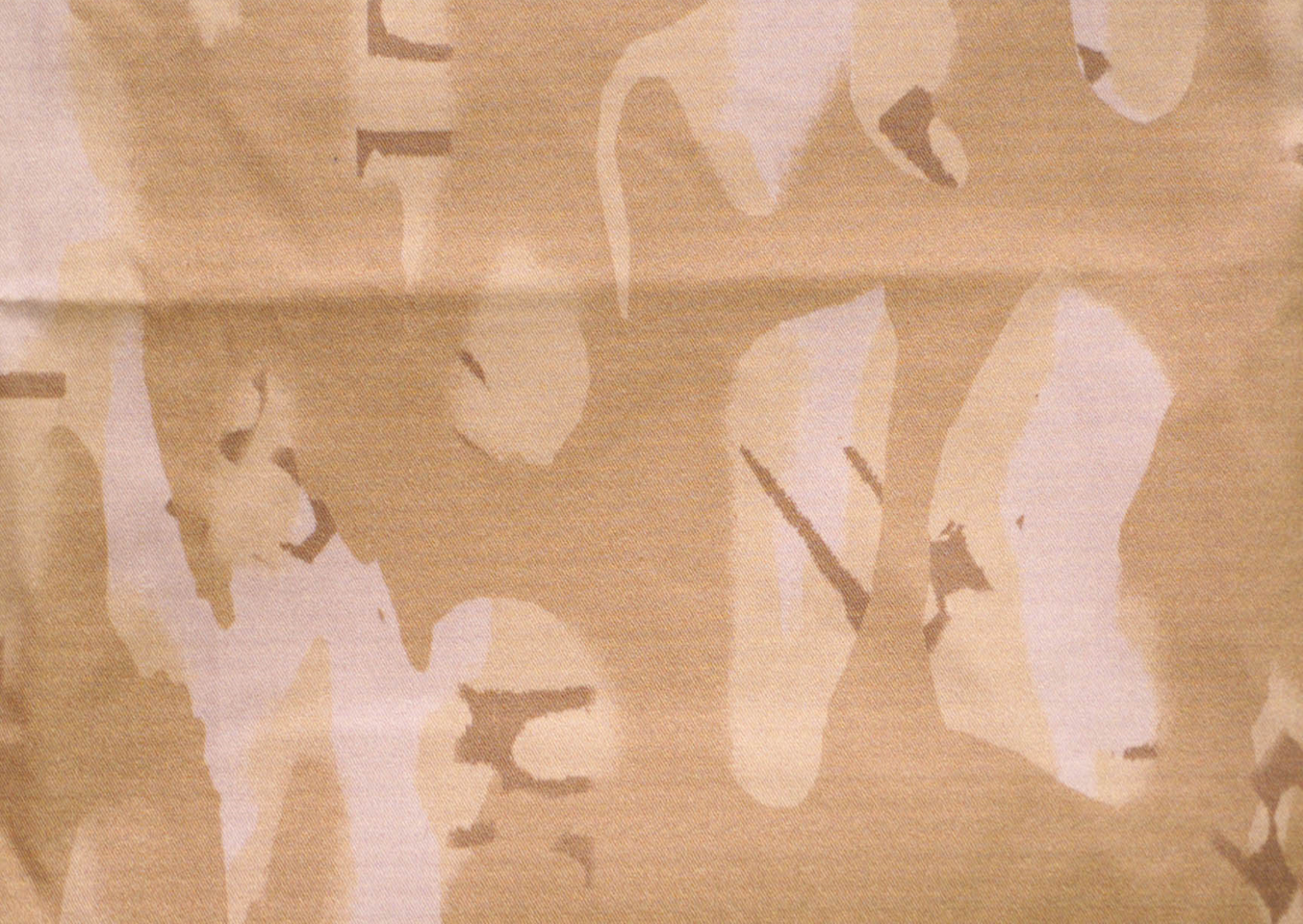
Desert/Urban

==== Shadowline ====
(No Officially Released Swatches)

=== Phase II (Production Printed) ===
==== All-Over Brush ====
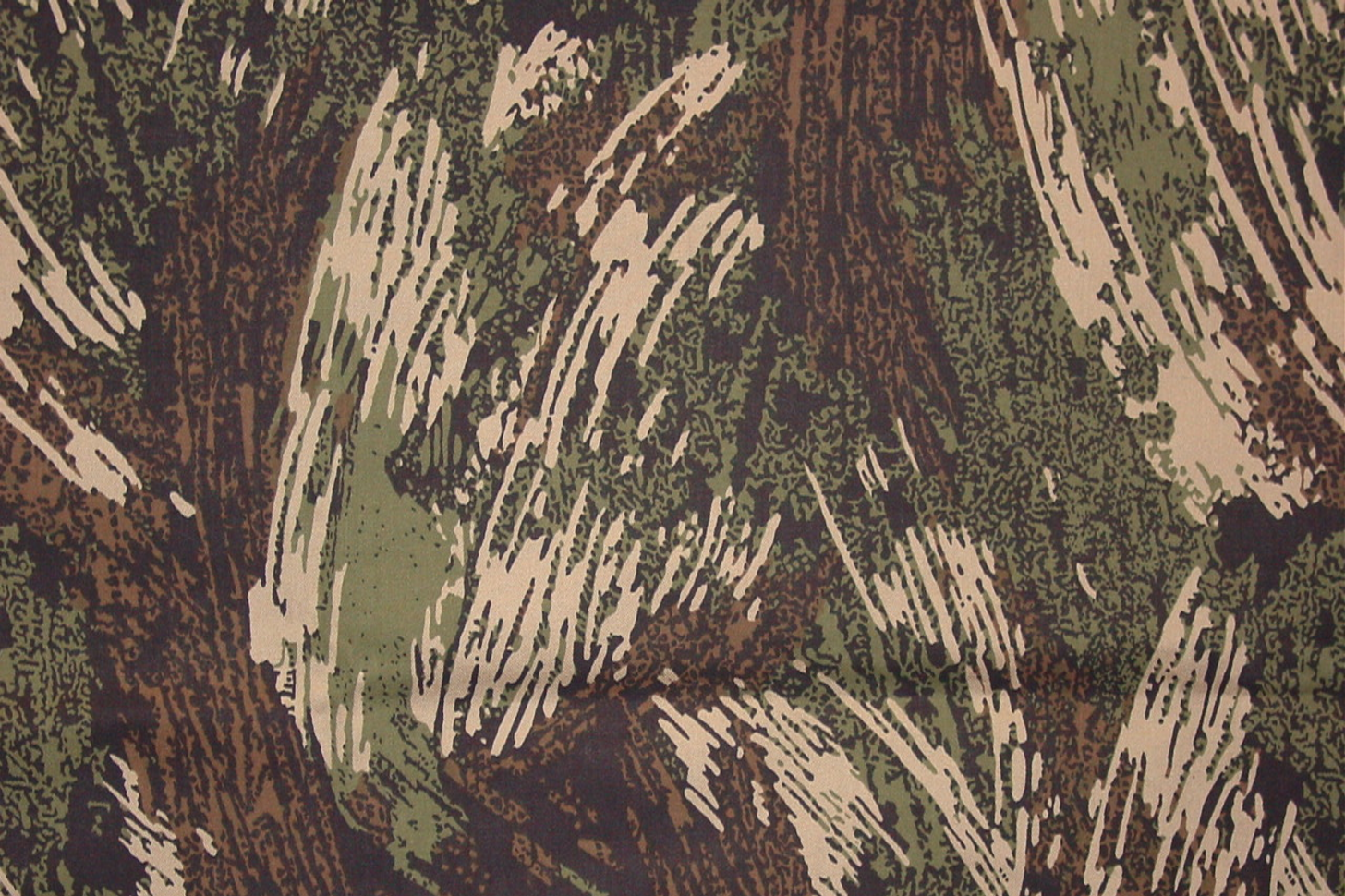
Woodland

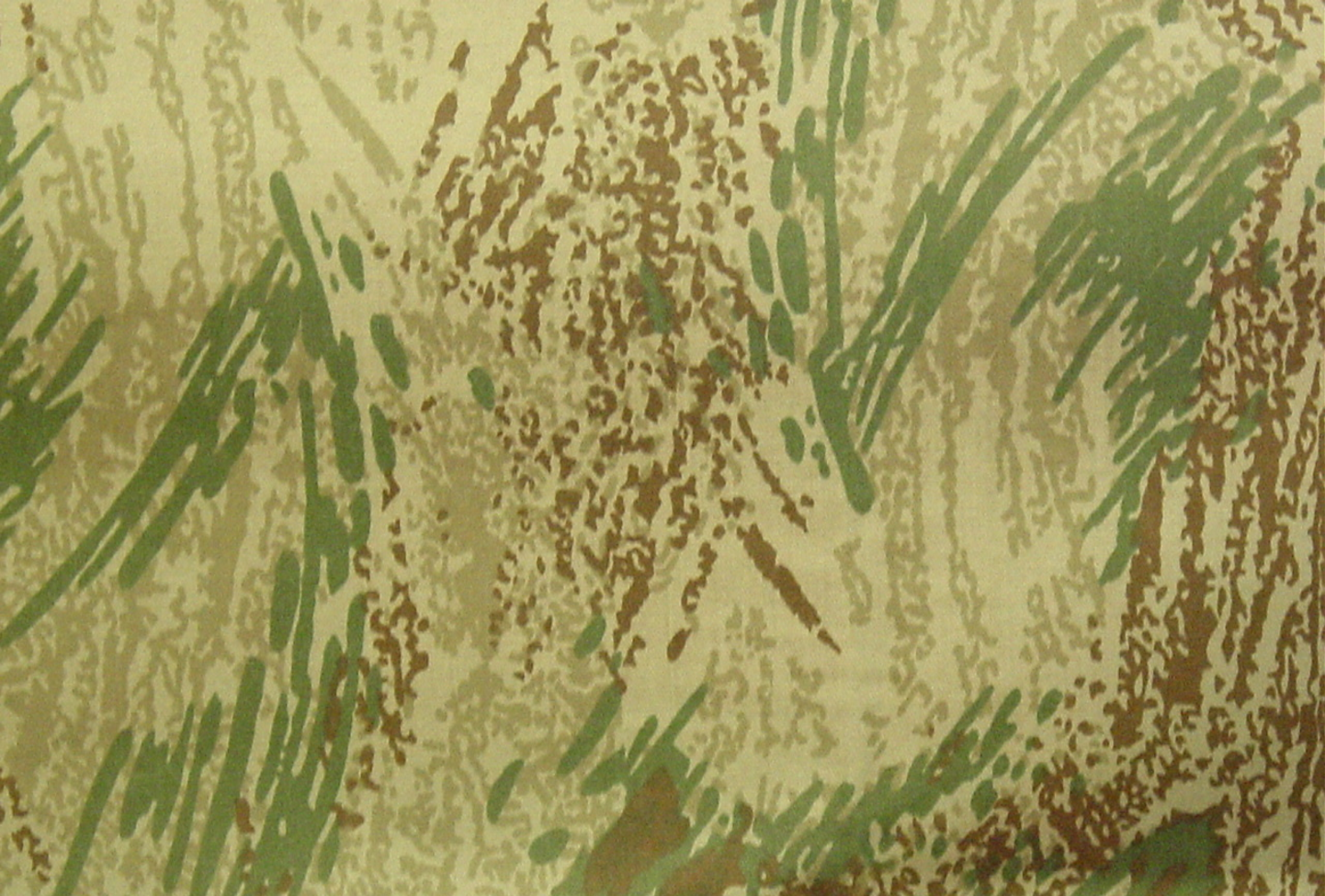
Desert

==== Track ====
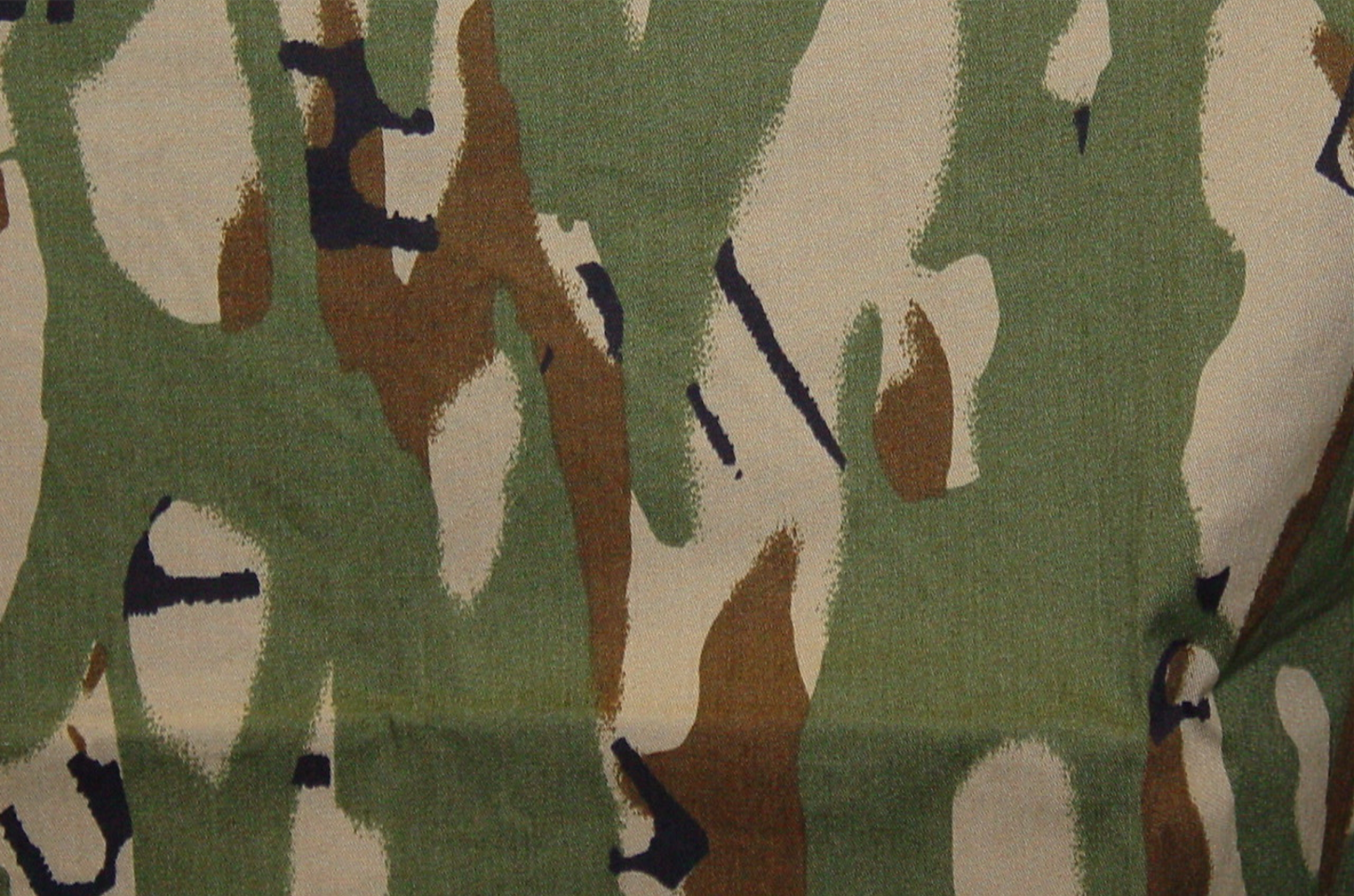
Woodland

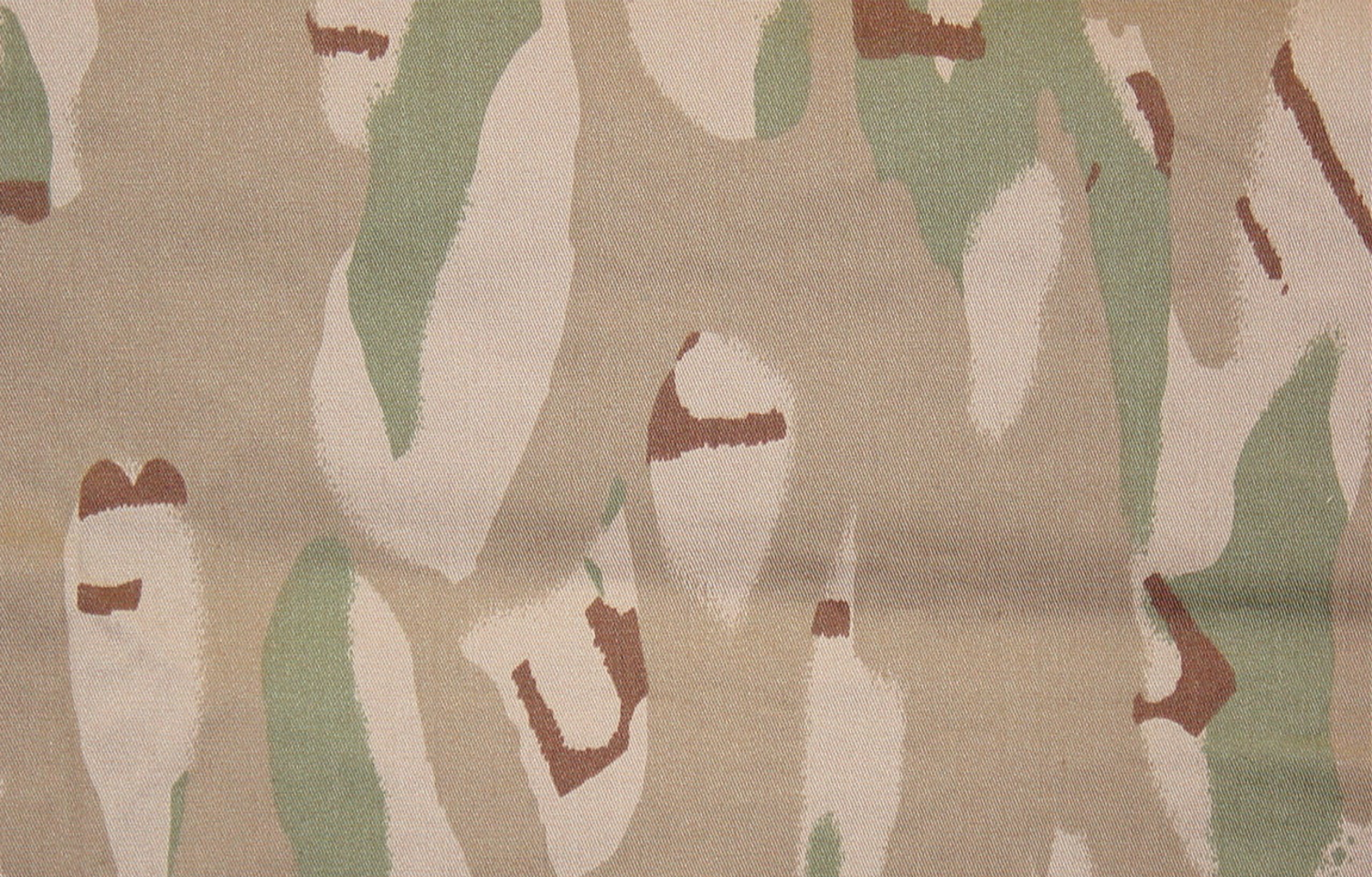
Desert

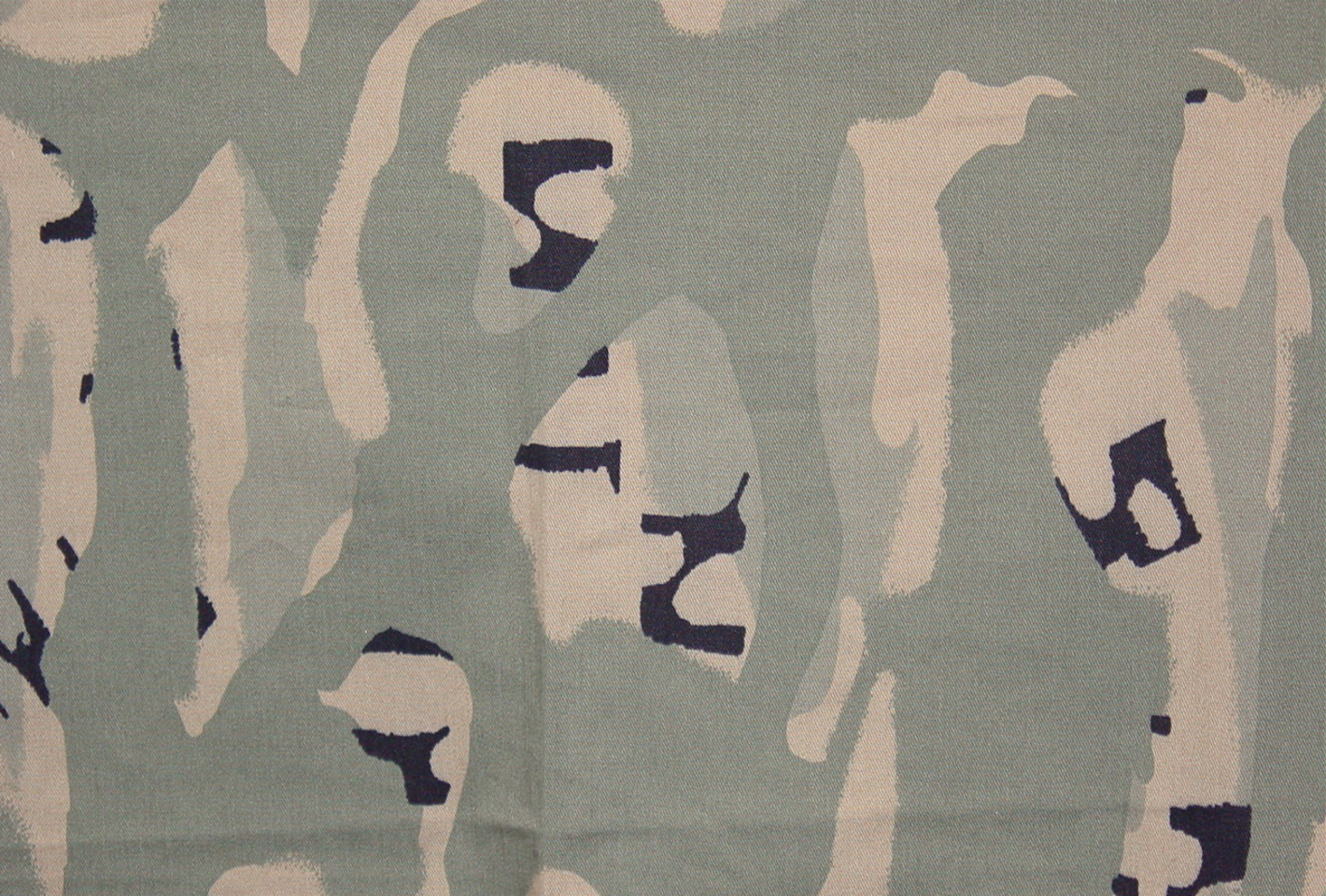
Urban

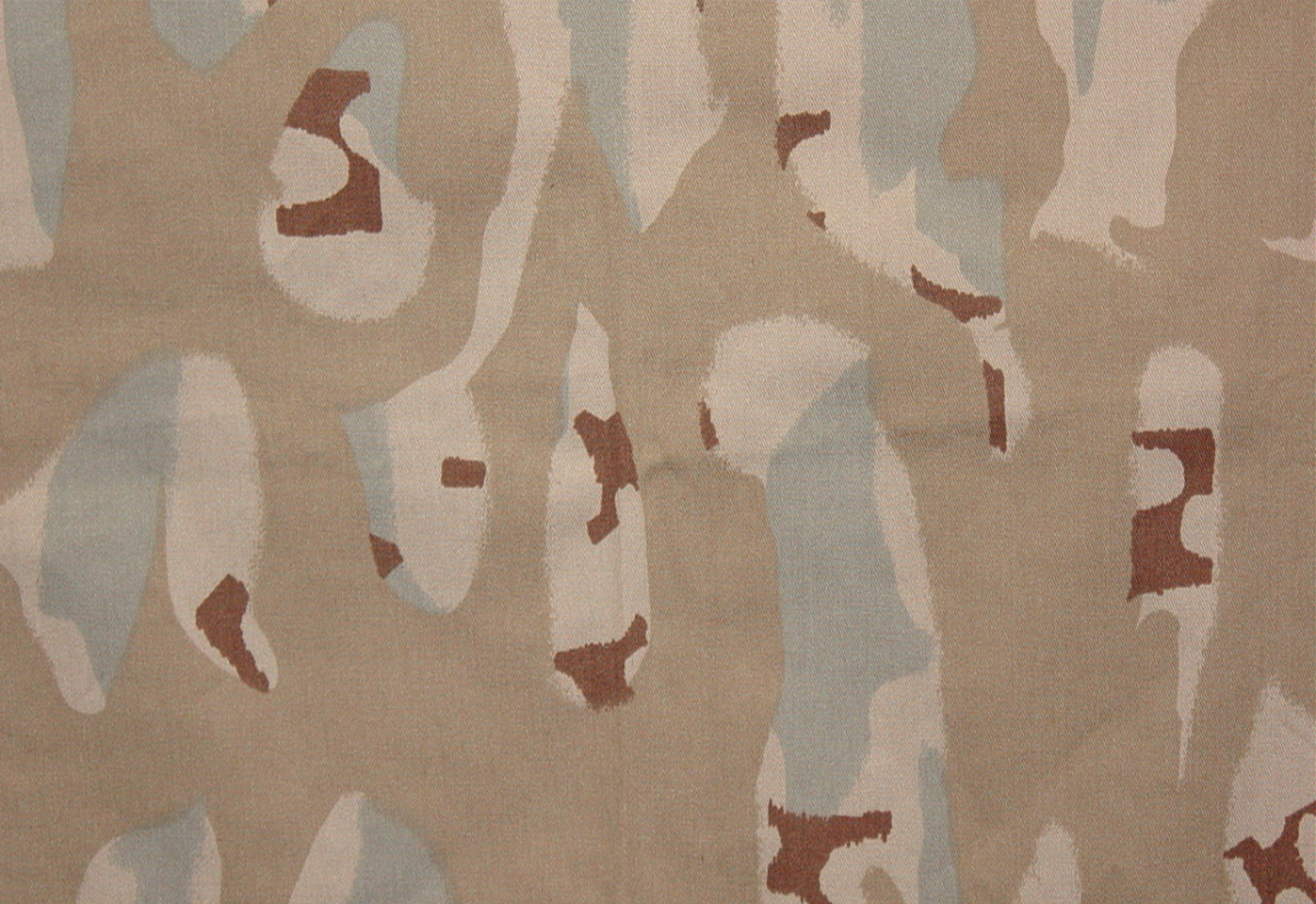
Desert/Urban

=== Phase III (Mods) ===
==== All-Over Brush ====
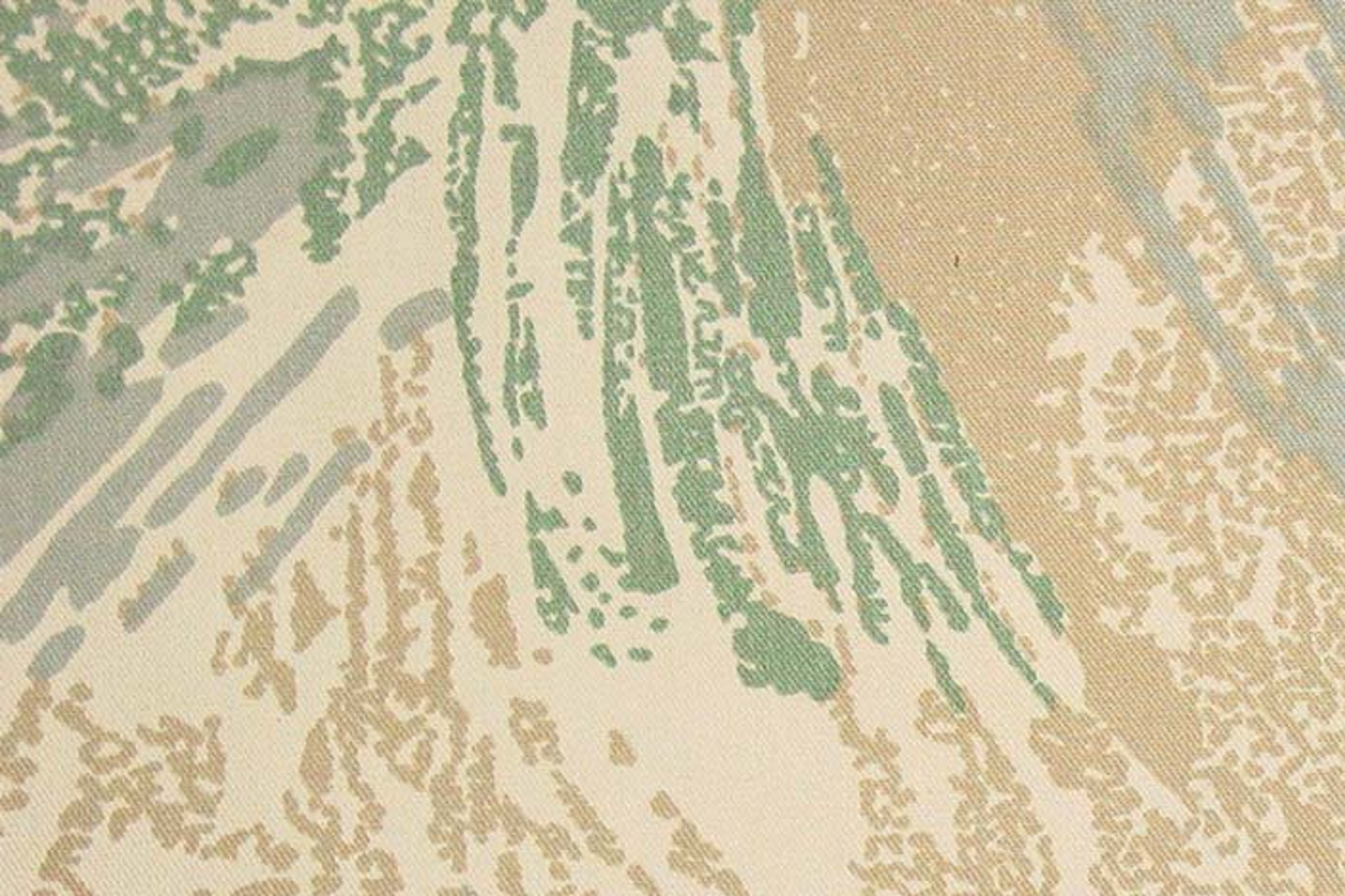
Desert (Mod)

==== Track ====
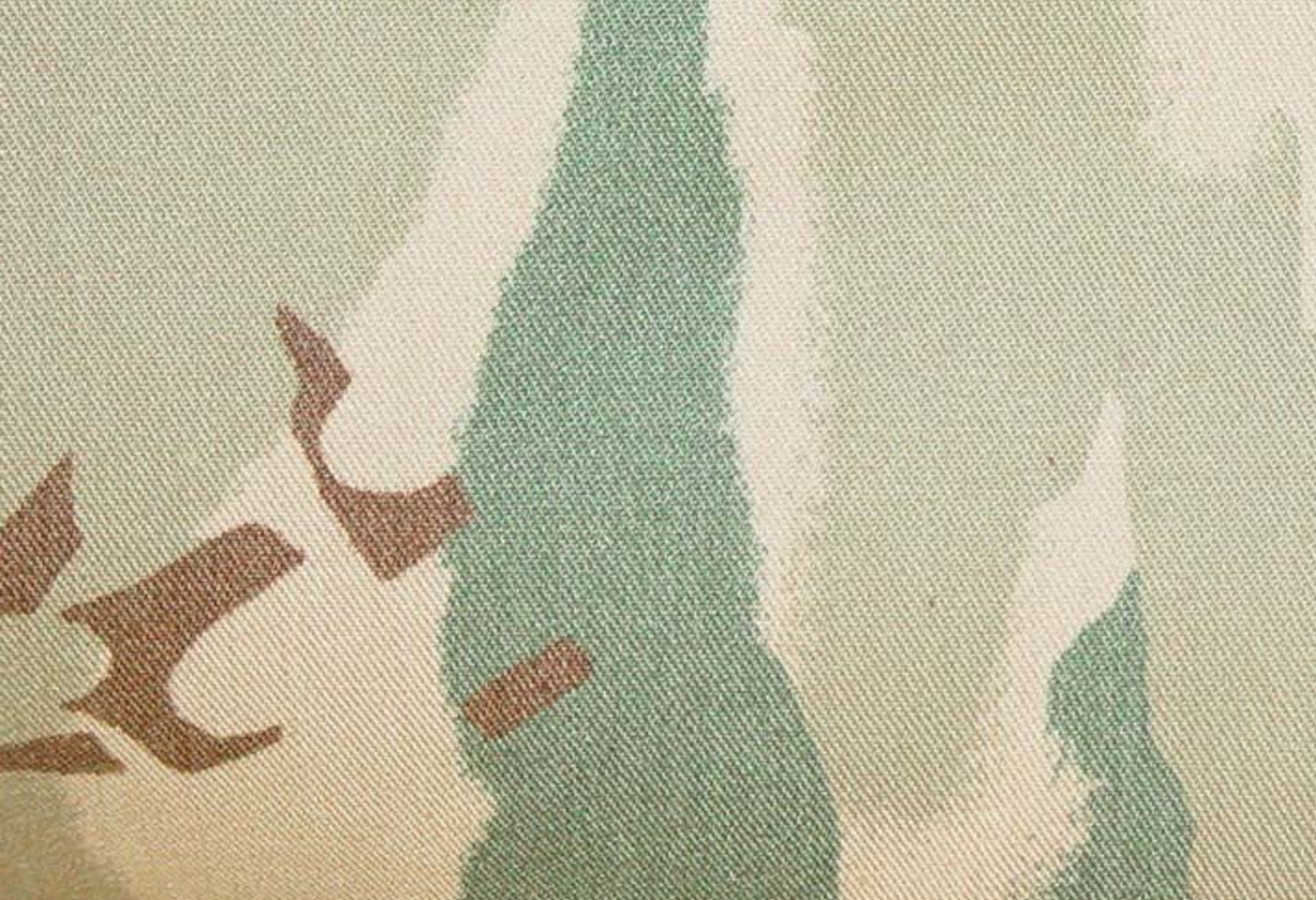
Woodland (Mod)

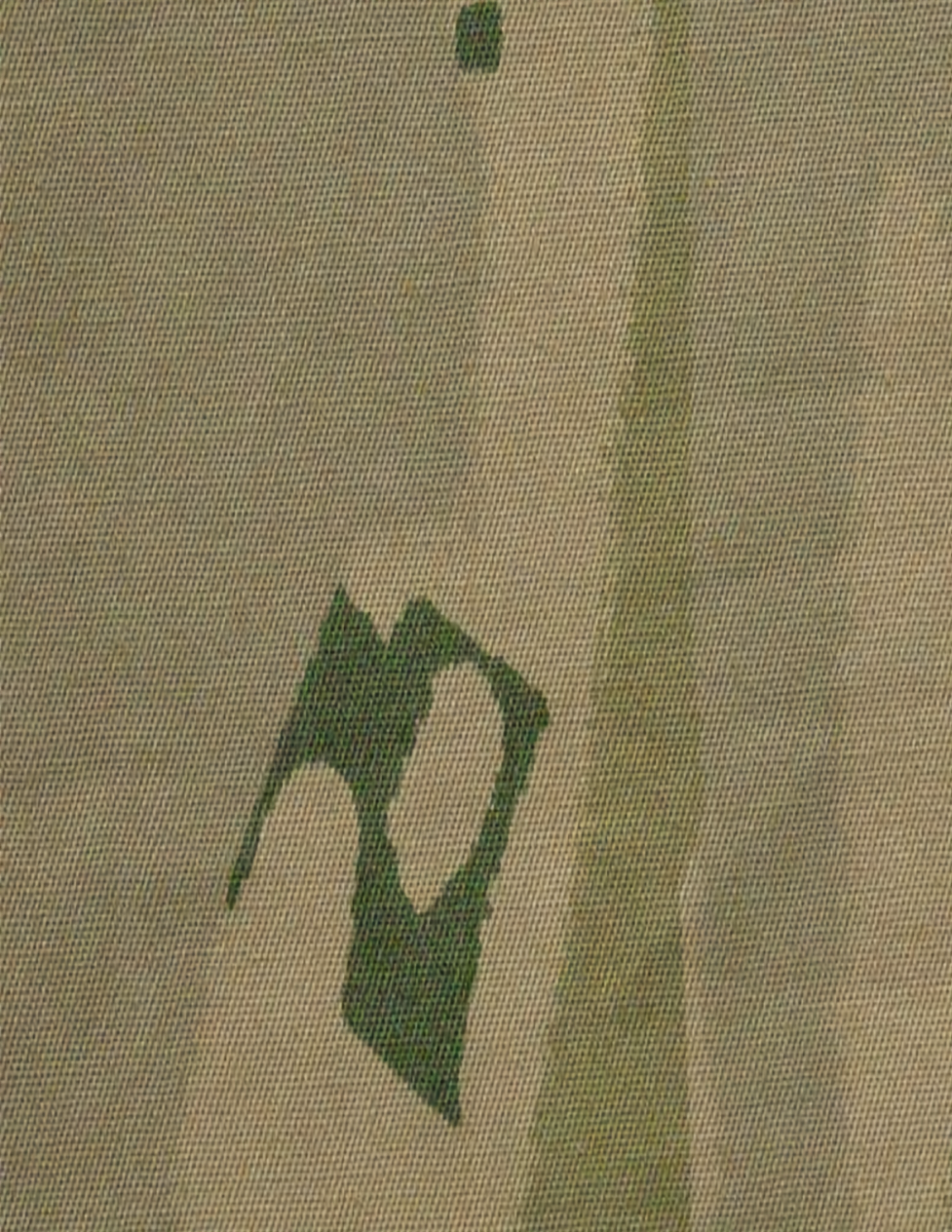
Light Urban (Mod)

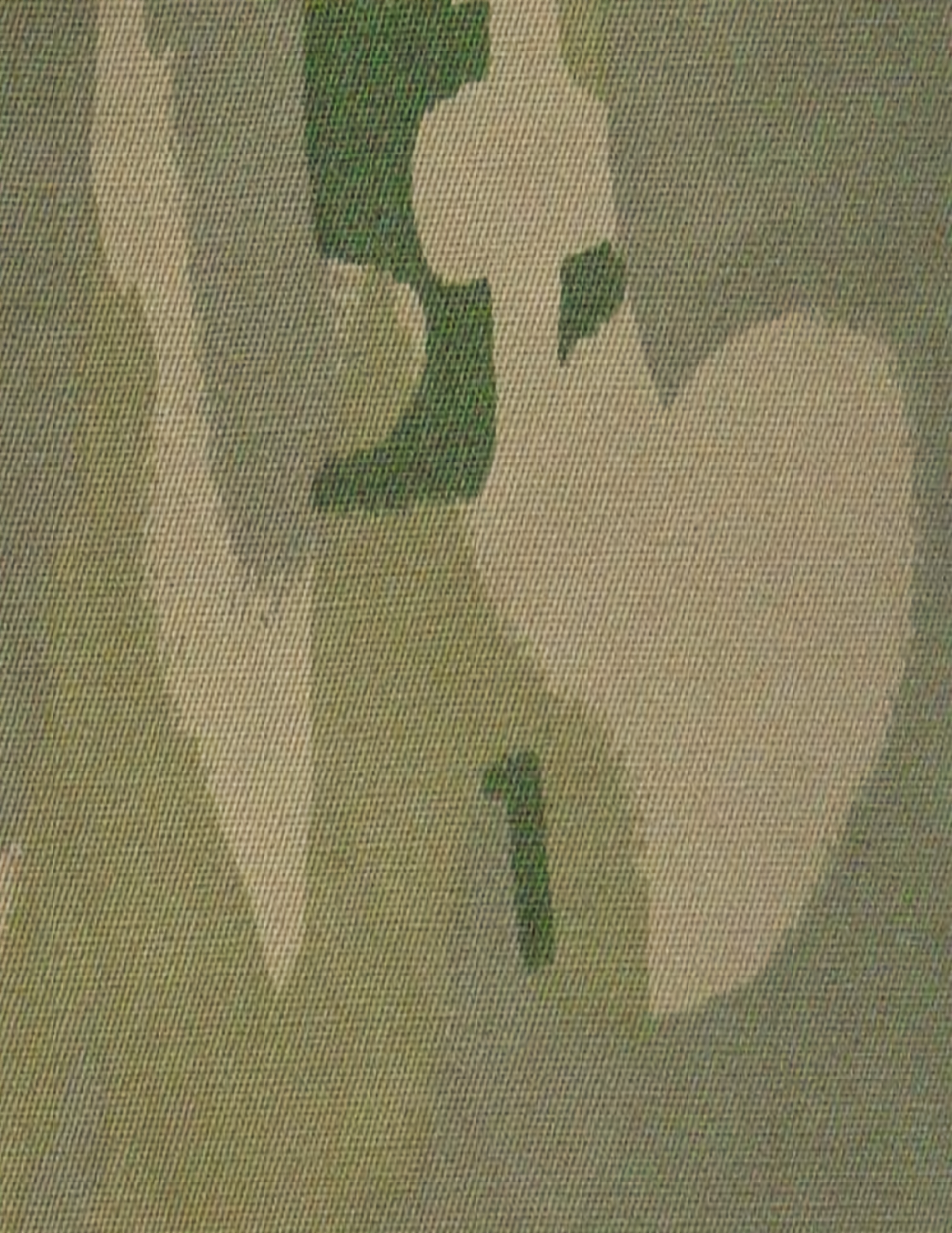
Dark Urban (Mod)

=== Phase IV (FFW System Level) ===
==== All-Over Brush ====
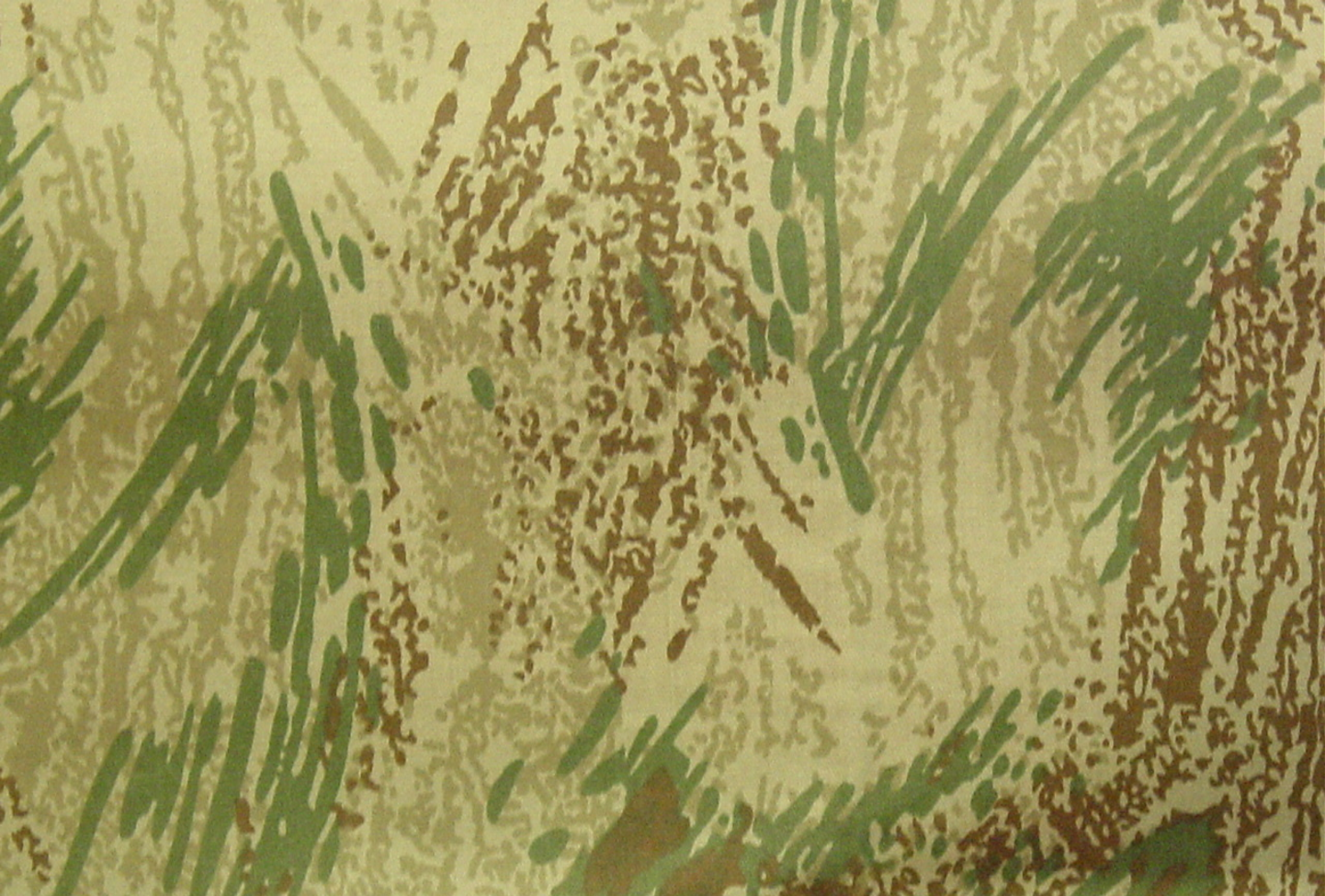
Desert

==== Track ====
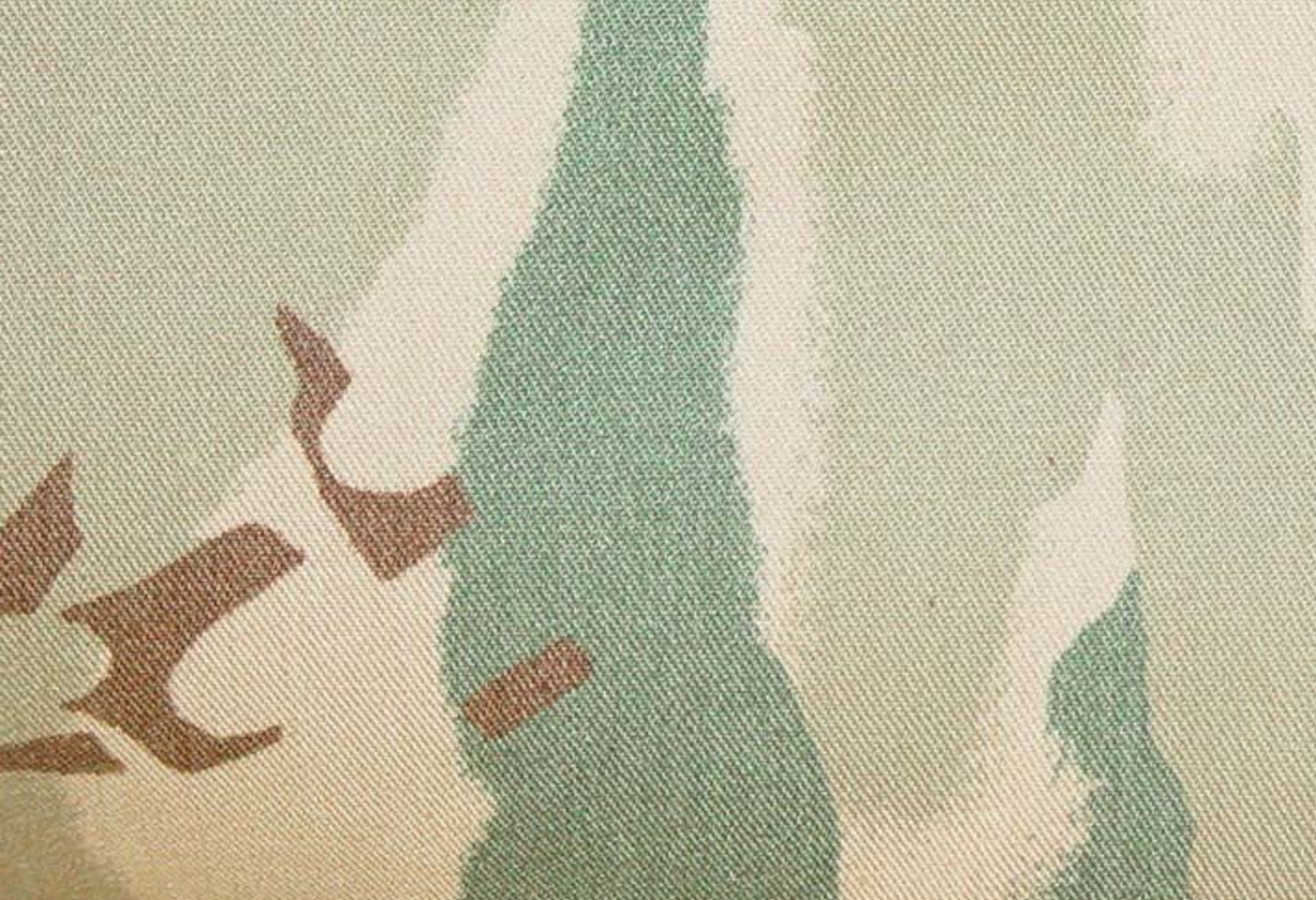
Woodland (Mod)

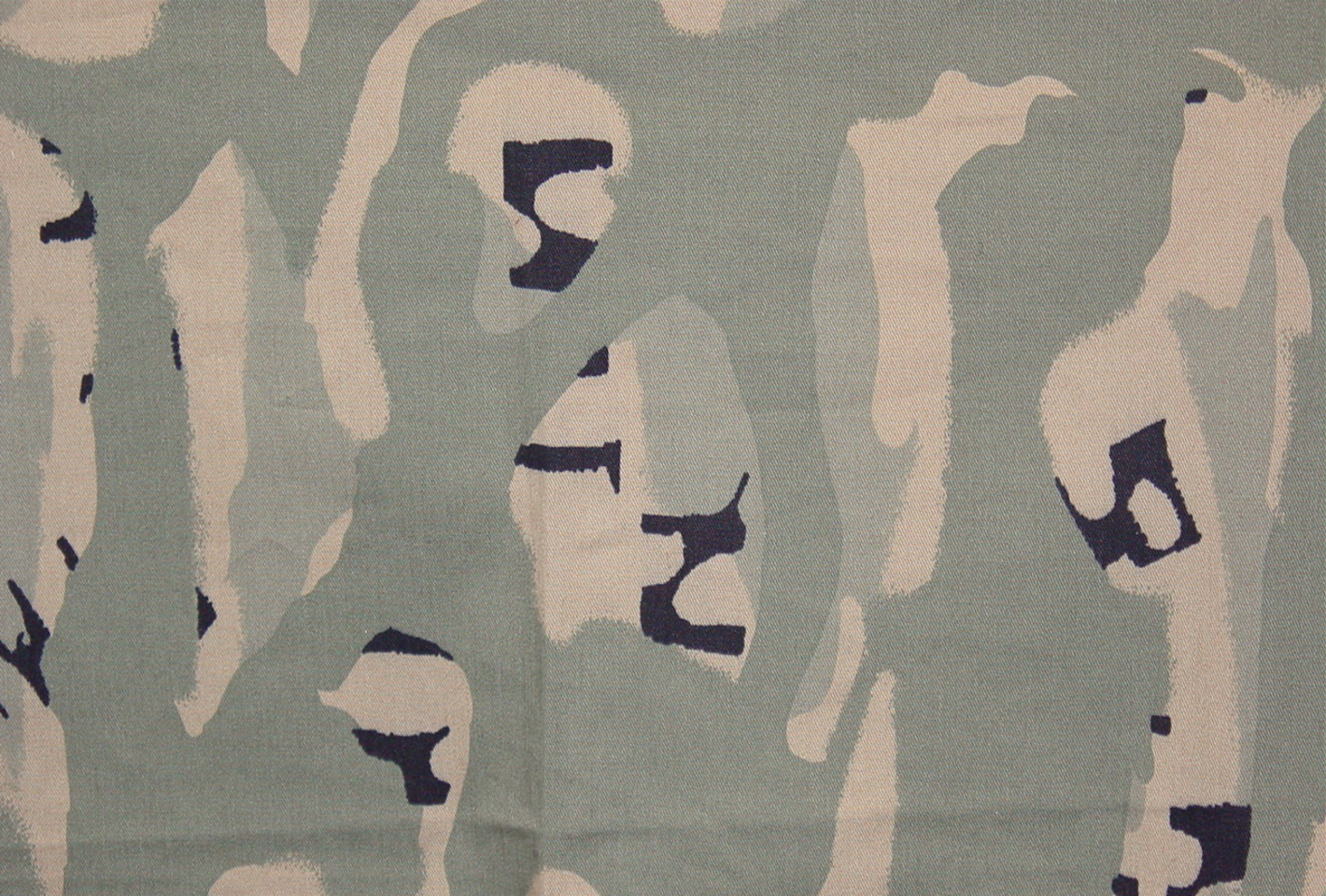
Urban

== Adoption of OCP ==
The Operational Camouflage Pattern, a modified version of the Scorpion pattern from the original trials, has been selected as the new pattern. It has been authorized for wear since 1 July 2015. The Universal Camouflage Pattern was authorized until 1 October 2019.

== See also ==
- List of camouflage patterns
