= Air Force Junior Reserve Officer Training Corps =

Military science elective class

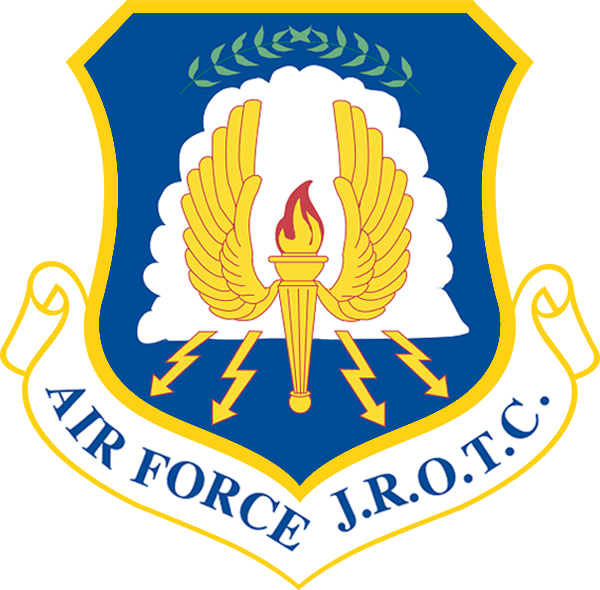
Air Force JROTC emblem

Air Force Junior Reserve Officers' Training Corps (AFJROTC) is an elective class offered in many high schools across the United States. It is the junior division of a U.S. Air Force Reserve Officers' Training Corps (ROTC) program composed of physical training, aerospace science academic classes, and leadership skill creation. Outside of the formal class, there are extra-curricular teams that cadets may participate in to create qualities of leadership and followership. Unlike the collegiate version of ROTC, upon completion of JROTC there is no military service required. This allows the youth of the United States to experience the military without having long-term commitments.

== Mission statement ==
To develop citizens of character dedicated to serving their nation and communities.

== History ==
Air Force Junior Reserve Officer Training Corps was founded in 1911 in Cheyenne, Wyoming, by Army Lt. Edgar R. Steevers. He created the program with the idea in mind to create more enlightened and higher quality citizens for the United States of America as well to educate young people about the military and its functions. AFJROTC is found at approximately 800 high schools across the nation as of 2014 and that number continues to grow.

== Chain of command and classroom procedures ==
AFJROTC is unique in its class procedures than typical classes that one takes in high school. AFJROTC is structured to be run predominantly by cadets, with the supervision of the Senior Aerospace Science Instructor (SASI) and Aerospace Science Instructor (ASI). Every Corps of Cadets has a chain of command similar to that in the actual military. At the top of the chain there is the Corps Commander who has his/her staff of leadership. The senior staff of cadets along with the Corps Commander decides what activities the Corps will partake in and/or sponsor. The SASI (Senior Aerospace Science Instructor) and ASI (Aerospace Science Instructor) oversee the activities and helps the corps achieve their unit and Head Quarter Goals. The SASI is a retired Air Force Commissioned Officer, and the ASI is a retired Air Force Senior Non-Commissioned Officer. The size of the Cadet Corps dictates the number of instructors. At a minimum all instructors are required to have a Bachelor's Degree, and a majority of them have their Master's Degree.

== Curriculum ==
Curriculum in Air Force Junior Reserve Officer Training Corps is spent instructing cadets about leadership, aerospace science, and how to become enlightened citizens. Leadership instruction is achieved by partial study of the matter, but is predominantly experience based. There are multiple leadership positions that cadets can hold that vary from Corps to Corps, but one similarity between all Corps is the chain of command that each one functions by. Cadets can work their way up the ladder of leadership in order to develop their skills, and are incentivized by a cadet rank system, similarly to that of the United States Air Force. Instruction in aerospace science consists primarily of the study of aerodynamics, the history of the Air Force, and the protocol of being a cadet in the Air Force JROTC program.

== Uniform wear ==
AFJROTC cadets wear the same uniform as active duty United States Air Force members, although with some differences in the way that the service dress uniform is worn. The Air Force requires that at least once a week AFJROTC cadets must wear their Dress Blues (Class A or Class B) as well as the ABUs (formally known as OCPs) and be inspected by their cadet leadership for accuracy. Cadets will also wear their uniform to parades, competitions, and ceremonial affairs. Cadets must learn how to properly adorn medals, ribbons, cords, badges, and other items awarded to cadets through their efforts put forth in the Corps.

All cadets wear the Air Force enlisted service dress uniform with an Air Force Junior ROTC patch and unit patch sewn onto the sleeves of the coat and shirt. Cadet officers and cadet enlisted both wear pin-on metal ranks on the lapels of their coats. Cadet officers wear slide-on soft ranks on the epaulets of their shirts while cadet enlisted wear pin-on metal ranks on the collar of their shirts. All Junior ROTC cadets wear the same flight caps as Air Force enlisted personnel with no thread piping, and cadet officers just wear an officer version of the AFJROTC insignia on their flight caps to distinguish themselves from cadet enlisted.

== Physical training ==
Physical training in AFJROTC consists of training the individual cadets to the Air Force’s standards of physical fitness for AFJROTC cadets. The training consists of physical examinations once an academic quarter (2 ½ months) to track progress and increase the physical abilities and limitations of the cadets. The fitness tests consist of flexibility testing, push-ups, sit-ups, pull-ups, sprinting exercises, and cardiovascular endurance via a one-mile run. Each quarter of the academic school year, cadets are tested on these qualities and their progress is tracked. Awards may be presented to cadets based on their ability to perform physically.

== Extracurricular activities ==
AFJROTC requires that cadets wear the uniform, participate in academics, and participate in physical fitness. Cadets do not have to participate in extra-curricular activities, however they are encouraged in order to advance in leadership positions and develop esprit de corps. Extra-curricular activities consist of regulation armed drill teams, regulation unarmed drill teams, exhibition armed drill teams, exhibition unarmed drill teams, the Junior Leadership Academic Bowl (JLAB), cyber patriot (instruction on how to defend against cyber hacking), flag detail, color guard, and raider teams (team that competes in various physical events). All of these teams compete against other JROTC units, and these competitions are sponsored by high schools, the JROTC units themselves, and occasionally Air Force collaborations. The AFA (Air Force Association) is the most notable sponsor of AFJROTC events, and is most famous for hosting drill team meets. In addition to teams, there are many field trips and camps that are available to cadets to get involved in their respective corps. Examples of some of these field trips offered to cadets include aerospace museum visits, KC-135 refueling aircraft trips, and week-long military camps at institutes across the nation such as The Citadel, the United States Air Force Academy, VMI, and Norwich University.

== Future opportunities ==
A Certificate of Completion is presented to Cadets who have completed at least three years of the AFJROTC program and have received a grade of 75% or higher each semester enrolled in the program. If a cadet chooses to enlist in a branch of the military, the Certificate of Completion will allow them to enlist as an E-3 in the Air Force, or as an E-2 or E-3 in other branches, however this and other benefits provided by the Certificate of Completion only apply if the Senior Aerospace Instructor (SASI) endorses the cadet.

A cadet who has been enrolled in AFJROTC for 2 or more years and is a graduating senior may be nominated for a J-100 scholarship by their unit instructor. Of the nominated cadets, 100 are awarded a scholarship. The scholarship includes 100% paid tuition at any university with a AFROTC detachment, $10k yearly allowance for on-campus housing, an annual book stipend, and a monthly cadet stipend. If a cadet accepts the scholarship, they are required to pursue an officer commission through AFROTC.
