= Australian Army Cadets =

Youth Development program of the Australian Army

- Active: 1866–present
- Country: Australia
- Allegiance: Australian Army
- Role: Australian Government youth development program
- Part of: Australian Defence Force Cadets
- Mottos: A Rising Generation, Under A Rising Sun
- Website: www.armycadets.gov.au

Commanders
- Commander: Brigadier David McCammon
- Assistant Commander: LTCOL (AAC) Andrew Hayes
- National Cadet Under Officer: NATCUO Peta Gibson
- National Cadet Under Officer Adjutant: NATCUO Sebastian Hunt
- National Training Cadet Under Officer: NATCUO Nick Thornley
- National Cadet Regimental Sergeant Major: NATCDTWO George Hancock

Insignia
- Unit Colour Patch

The Australian Army Cadets (AAC) is a national youth development program and organisation of the Australian Army, tasked with supporting young Australians from all backgrounds to contribute to society, developing interest and support for the Australian Defence Force. The program has more than 22,000 army cadets between the ages of 12 and 20 based in more than 250 units around Australia. The values of the AAC are "Service, Courage, Respect, Integrity and Excellence".

The cadet program has strong links to the Australian Army and is a part of the Australian Defence Force Cadets. However, its members are not members of the Australian Defence Force by virtue, only of their membership of the AAC.

Activities of the AAC include but are not limited to drill and ceremonial parade, abseiling, seamanship, navigation, handling and use of Australian Defence Force weapons, field exercises and first aid.

The Australian Army Cadets are headquartered at Brindabella Business Park in Canberra. There are also regional headquarters which are directly in command of Army Cadet Brigades/Battalions.

== Background ==
The Australian Army Cadets is authorised under Section 62 of the Defence Act 1903 with lawful policies provided in the Cadet Forces Regulations 2013 (originally authorised under Cadet Forces Regulations 1977). The Australian Army Cadets is a youth organisation that is modelled on the Australian Army. It differs from Scouts Australia and other youth exploration groups as its main focus is that of learning and using military and leadership skills. The organisation boasts a nationwide reach with cadet units in every state and territory in Australia.

Youth must be at least 12 years of age, and not have reached age 17 to be eligible to apply for enrolment into the AAC. Once enrolled, they may remain as a cadet until the last day of the year they reach age 18. Age extensions exist for some positions (Battalion, Regional, National) to the age of 19, but this is a very rare occurrence. A cadet in the AAC is not considered to be a member of the Australian Defence Force, nor are cadets allowed to be a member of the Defence Force or any other cadet service during their time as a cadet. However, members of the Australian Defence Force are attached to AAC units and activities.

Research studies have shown that cadets have performed better than non-cadets in Australian Defence Force Training, and 25.4% of the Australian Defence Force has been in the Australian Defence Force Cadets. From 2001 to 2005, cadets made up 10% of applications and 11% of total Australian Defence Force enlistments.

== History ==
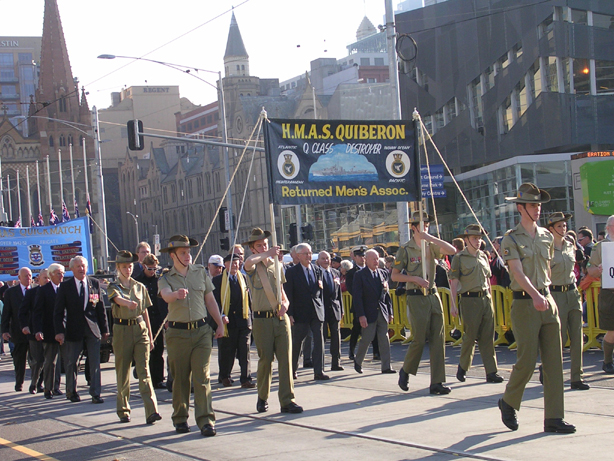
Cadets of 306ACU Monash and Australian veterans parading in Melbourne on ANZAC Day

The King's School and Newington College vie for the honour of having the oldest Cadet Corps in Australia. An embryonic corps was founded by Newington College when a drill master was appointed to staff in 1865. Two years later, a sergeant-major was appointed, muskets and carbines were purchased, and an armoury and gunpowder store were opened at Newington College. The first official unit in Australia was established on 29 March 1866 at St Mark's Collegiate School by Reverend Macarthur. In June 1868, the King's School had closed and did not reopen until January 1869, when it was amalgamated with the St Mark's unit. The unit was renamed the King's School Cadets Corps. In 1869, the Newington College Cadet Corps was formally incorporated by the Governor of New South Wales (Somerset Lowry-Corry, 4th Earl Belmore), and is now believed to be the second oldest continually running corps in Australia, after The King's School Cadet Corps. The first regional unit, and third oldest continually running corps in the country, was established in September 1898 by The Armidale School. With the establishment of many cadet units and corps at numerous boys' schools throughout the Commonwealth, His Majesty King Edward VII established the Commonwealth Cadet Corps in Australia on 16 July 1906.

However, military training to students commenced in 1851 in the Port Phillip Colony of New South Wales, the year Victoria separated from NSW, when Sergeant Major Cleary from the 12th Regiment of Foot, based at Victoria Barracks (Melbourne), commenced drill instruction to students at Scotch College before the establishment of their cadet unit in 1884 when The Volunteer (Cadet) Act 1884 came into effect. A school holiday was proclaimed on 19 November 1886 to mark the occasion of the first public parade of the Victorian Cadet Force at Albert Park. More than 2000 cadets representing the units of 41 state schools, 11 independent or private schools and one Catholic school were inspected by the governor.

In 1910, the Universal Training Scheme was introduced. Under the scheme, all medically fit males 14–20 years of age had to serve in cadets. Boys who did not comply were charged and dealt with by the courts. Training cadets were divided into two groups. Senior cadets between 16 and 18 years of age were attached to militia units (now known as Army reserve units), called regimental detachments, while students between 14 and 16 years of age remained as school cadets. Officers came from teaching staff, and selected cadets were made "Cadet Lieutenants". In 1939, the outbreak of World War II caused the regimental detachments to be disbanded as staff were needed to train soldiers for overseas service. Some school based units closed down while some struggled on. By the end of World War II, regimental detachments had been re-raised. Between 1949 and 1975, school based units were attached to citizen military forces units. The CMF is the precursor of the modern day Australian Army Reserve. Regimental units continued to exist.

By 1951, The Commonwealth Cadet Corps was renamed the Australian Cadet Corps (ACC). On 2 June 1953, The Duke of Edinburgh became the Colonel-in-Chief of the ACC, as a part of the coronation of his wife, Queen Elizabeth II. The Duke of Edinburgh presented his banner as a gift to the Corps on 2 May 1970 at Victoria Barracks, Sydney. At this time, there were 46,000 cadets in Australia.

In 1975, the ACC was disbanded by the Whitlam Labor government and was re-raised by the Fraser Liberal government on 1 October 1976. By 1981, the ACC had 20,650 cadets. As a result of the Beazley Defence review white paper in 1984, full military support was withdrawn from school based cadet units, now classed as limited support Units (LSU). Military support for LSUs was limited solely to the discretionary loan of equipment for annual camps. Uniforms, transport, rations and personal equipment all had to be funded by the school, parents or community organisations such as the RSL. As a result, most government school based cadet units closed between 1984 and 1986. Instead, full military support was provided to cadet units based at existing Army depots, now classified as regional cadet Units (RCU). Some school based units in disadvantaged areas or located some distance from a military depot were given RCU status. Many RCUs attracted cadets from the nearby school based units recently closed down. In NSW, the first RCU formed was 20 RCU Ashfield, originally Punchbowl High School Cadets, and then based at the 2 Construction Group depot of RAE in Haberfield, Sydney in early 1984. By 1998, however, all cadet units again received full support. In 1993, the Australian Cadet Corps was renamed the Australian Army Cadet Corps. Many cadet units were now re-equipped with DPCU uniforms replacing the older green uniforms. In 2001, the Australian Army Cadet Corps was renamed the Australian Army Cadets as part of major reforms brought about with the Topley review. In 2004, the title of regional cadet unit (RCU) was dropped in favour of Army cadet unit (ACU).

Governor-General Michael Jeffery presented a replacement banner on behalf of the Duke to Parade Commander and National Cadet Adjutant CUO Christopher Casey (of 236 ACU Toukley) on behalf of the AAC to commemorate the centenary of the cadets on 24 September 2005, with the old Duke of Edinburgh Banner laid up at the Soldiers Chapel at Kapooka during the 2006 Chief of Army Cadet Team Challenge.

The AAC celebrated its centenary since the establishment of the Commonwealth Cadet Corps on 16 July 2006, as opposed to the centenaries of individual units, with the Victorian Brigade holding a large parade to mark the event.

As of 2026, the largest individual AAC unit is the Knox Ravenswood Army Cadet Unit (KRACU), with 1200 members.

== Structure ==
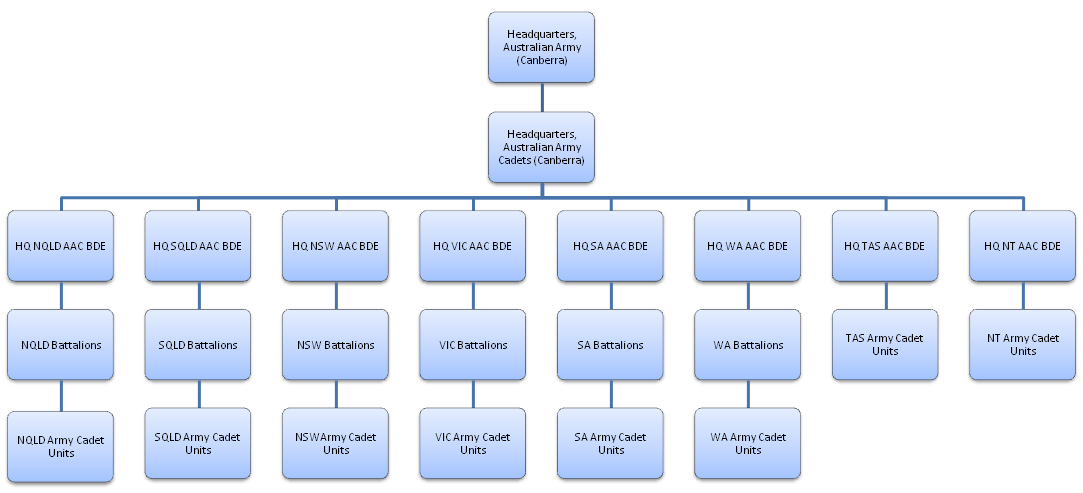
Structure of the Australian Army Cadets

- Headquarters of the Australian Army
- Headquarters Australian Army Cadets (HQAAC)
- Regional Headquarters (brigades or battalions, depending on number of cadets)
  - Headquarters New South Wales AAC Brigade (HQ NSW AAC BDE) (which includes the Australian Capital Territory and Norfolk Island)
  - Headquarters New South Wales 2nd AAC Brigade (HQ NSW 2nd AAC BDE) (Only involves school based units inside of New South Wales)
  - Headquarters Victoria AAC Brigade (HQ VIC AAC BDE)
  - Headquarters North Queensland AAC Brigade (HQ NQLD AAC BDE)
  - Headquarters South Queensland AAC Brigade (HQ SQLD AAC BDE)
  - Headquarters Tasmania AAC Battalion (HQ TAS AAC BN)
  - Headquarters Northern Territory AAC Battalion (HQ NT AAC BN)
  - Headquarters Western Australia AAC Brigade (HQ WA AAC BDE)
  - Headquarters South Australia AAC Brigade (HQ SA AAC BDE)
  - Headquarters Capital & South Coast AAC Brigade ( HQ CSC AAC BDE)
- Brigades are then broken up into battalions.
- Cadet units are usually based on a company structure (the larger units are based on a battalion structure), and are under the control of both the battalion and brigade HQs.

_{Note: Although most regional headquarters are state based, Queensland has been split into North and South due to their combined size. Additionally, most school based units (SBUs) in New South Wales are part of New South Wales 2nd Australian Army Cadets Brigade.}

== Controversies ==
The Australian public generally view the AAC as a positive youth development program. Political views have changed throughout the years. The AAC has been subject to criticism, most notably because of its military uniform, program, discipline and structure in youth training. In the 1970s, under the Whitlam government, the AAC was briefly disestablished from defence force and government control, and support and military-like training was suspended and reviewed. However, many units continued under private operation.

=== Deaths in the AAC ===
==== Nathan Francis (13 years old) ====
In 2007, a Scotch College Cadet Unit cadet, Nathan Francis, died from an anaphylactic reaction to a combat ration pack, resulting in this particular type of rations being withdrawn from use. The cadet's death was caused by significant delays in the administration of an epinephrine autoinjector. Cadets with special dietary requirements are now issued specifically designed and cleared ration packs, and no nuts are permitted on cadet activities.

==== Clare Francis Stokes (18 years old) ====
Cadet Under Officer (CUO) Clare Francis Stokes, a NQLD BDE cadet was killed by decapitation on the 20th June 1997 during transport on a cadet activity at Bulimba Station. The overloaded, unroadworthy Toyota Landcruiser on which they were travelling overturned on a sandy road, carrying 16 people - 14 sitting on their packs in the tray. 5 other cadets were non fatally injured in the incident. Three people were charged with manslaughter following the seven month inquiry into her death, with the Australian Defence Force denying any responsibility.

In 1999, AAC personnel were officially included in the OHS Act 1991, designated as employees of the Australian Government, and subsequently under the jurisdiction of federal Health and Safety practices.

==== Karl Peter Sperling (13 years old) ====
Karl Peter Sperling, of South Burnett Army Cadet Group, died after being airlifted to Nambour General Hospital on the 21st November 2000 after being found submerged and unresponsive in a body of water on an end of year cadet field exercise at Bjelke-Petersen Dam, QLD, 3 days prior. Several attempts were made to resuscitate the Cadet on scene before he arrived at the hospital's Intensive Care Unit (ICU) and was placed on life-support. Despite these measures he was deemed brain-dead and the official cause of death was ruled a drowning.

Sperling’s death influenced numerous changes in the AAC’s guidelines surrounding water-based Cadet activities including:

Adjusting the wearing of Cadet uniforms whilst participating - as Sperling was found to have been wearing boots at the time of drowning, which are thought to have weighed him down;

And minimising the amount of responsibilities that adult supervisors have whilst these activities take place to ensure a quick response time.

== National Cadet Leadership Group ==
The National Cadet Leadership Group (NCLG) are the four most senior cadets in Australia, who provide an experienced Cadet perspective to HQ AAC. These include:

- National Cadet Under Officer (NATCUO)
- National Cadet Adjutant (NATCDTADJT)
- National Training Cadet Under Officer (NATTRGCUO)
- National Cadet Regimental Sergeant Major (NATCDTRSM)

The tenure of these appointments is one year, without a possibility of a consecutive appointment.

The Senior Cadet Leadership Group (SCLG) is a collection of every regional appointment from across Australia.

This includes regional CUOs, regional RSMs, and where applicable, regional ADJTs and TRGOs. The SCLG meets monthly, discussing a range of matters including updates from around the country, and initiatives and taskings passed down from HQ AAC.

The SCLG meets at intervals throughout the year. Items to be discussed are compiled previous to the meeting by the NATCUO and NATCDTADJT. Minutes from each meeting are recorded by the NATCDTADJT and distributed.

=== Members of the SCLG ===
The SCLG is chaired by the National Cadet Under Officer, with the National Cadet Adjutant as Secretary. The Regional Cadet Under Officer and Regional Cadet RSM of each AAC region make up the council, alongside any other regional appointments for which there is some regional variation. The regions are divided as follows: North Queensland, South Queensland, New South Wales, New South Wales 2nd, Victoria, Tasmania, South Australia, Western Australia and Northern Territory.

== Uniform ==
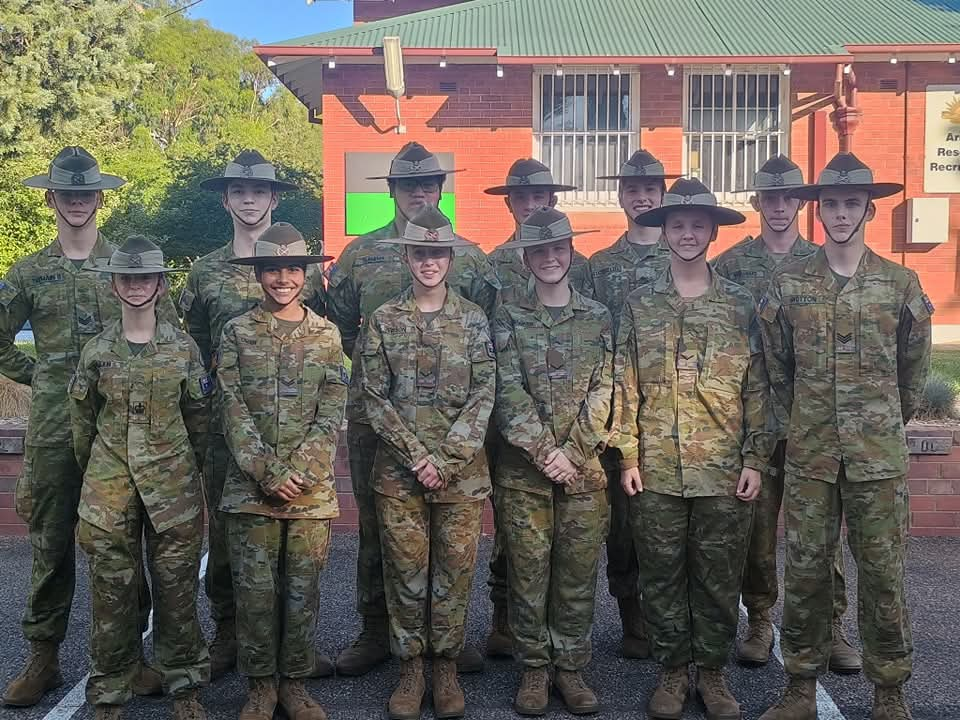
The Australian Army Cadet uniform is AMCU (Australian MultiCam Uniform). Most units use this uniform, however the older DPCU (Disruptive Pattern Camouflage Uniform) is still used in units where AMCU is yet to be issued, or for non-standard duties such as field exercises or ceremonial events. AMCU is increasingly replacing DPCU, and is now used for ceremonial and field activities by some units.

All members of the AAC used to wear "Auscam" DPCU uniforms for all cadet related activities. However, since 2023, the AAC have almost completely replaced this with the newer AMCU model. Some units however do not have complete AMCU gear, usually DPCU rank slides or equipment, particularly webbing. In order to distinguish cadets from Australian soldiers, cadets wear a blue oval patch in a similar shape to the ADF service badges but with the Corps' "sword and torch emblem" on it. Additionally AAC rank slides always have a blue and yellow "Army Cadet" (for cadets) or "AAC" (for instructors) banner added to them underneath the rank insignia in place of the black "Australia" lettering of Australian Army rank slides. Cadets' slouch hats generally have a metal "sword and torch" Corps Badge at the front and a blue and yellow patch on the right side, although some units issue their own badges, notably something the Australian Army does not do, exclusively using Corps Badges.

Previously cadets could also wear ceremonial uniform identical to that of the Australian Army. This is still maintained by a selection of private school units, however its use for non School Based Units (SBUs) is reserved for events of significant importance such as the Tri-Service King's Birthday Parade, in which a small store of 100 uniforms are held and loaned to NSW AAC Bde, for use by all AAC BDE's.

Cadets of more senior ranks may wear additional accoutrements that help to distinguish their rank, such as a red sash for Cadet Sergeants and Cadet Warrant Officer Class Two, and Sam Browne belts for Cadet Warrant Officer Class One, Cadet Warrant Officer and Cadet Under Officers. However, these items are only worn for ceremonial events.

== Cadets rank system ==
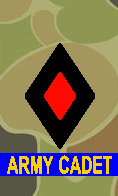
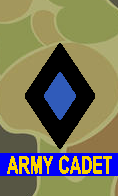
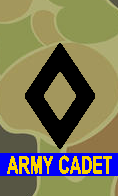
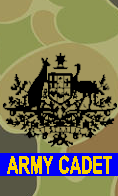
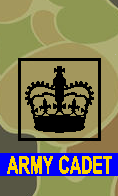
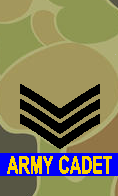
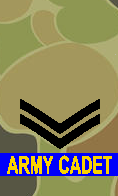
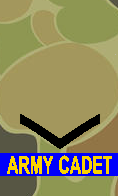
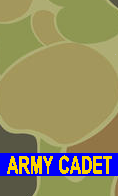
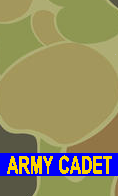
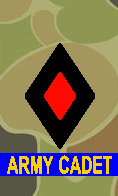
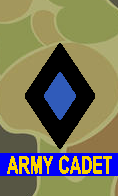
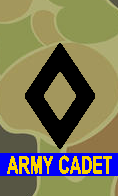
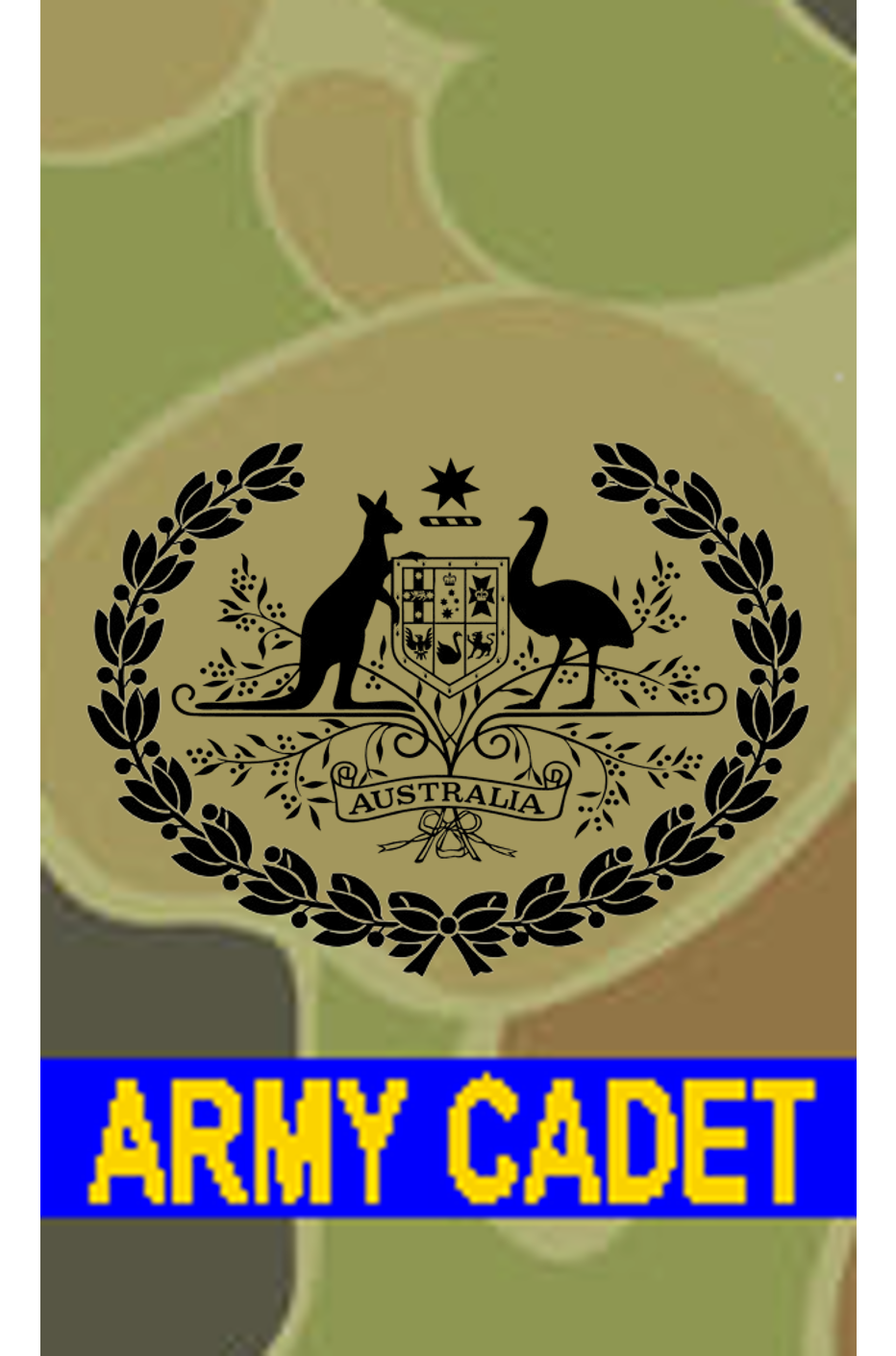
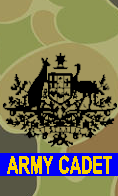
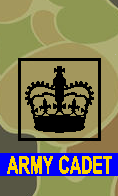
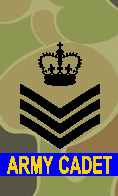
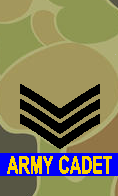
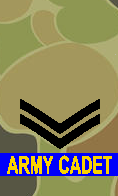
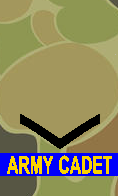
ADFC Cadets	CDT 9 (Special Grade)			CDT 8	CDT 7		CDT 6		CDT 5	CDT 4	CDT 3	CDT 2	CDT 1	CDT (R)
Australian Army Cadets												No equivalent			National Cadet Under Officer	National Cadet Regimental Sergeant Major	Regional Cadet Under Officer	Cadet Under Officer	Cadet Warrant Officer Class One	Cadet Warrant Officer Class Two	Cadet Sergeant	Cadet Corporal	Cadet Lance Corporal	Cadet	Cadet Recruit
Australian Army Cadets		NCUO	NRSM	RCUO	CUO	CDTWO1		CDTWO2		CDTSGT	CDTCPL	No equivalent	CDTLCPL	CDT	CDTREC
Australian Army Cadets (prior to 2012)												No equivalent	No equivalent	No insignia
Australian Army Cadets (prior to 2012)	National Cadet Under Officer	Regional Cadet Under Officer		Cadet Under Officer	Cadet Warrant Officer (RSM)	Cadet Warrant Officer Class One	Cadet Warrant Officer Class Two	Cadet Staff Sergeant (Phased out in 2011)	Cadet Sergeant	Cadet Corporal	Cadet Lance Corporal (formerly Cadet First Class)		Cadet	Cadet Recruit
	NCUO	RCUO		CUO	CDTWO	CDTWO1	CDTWO2	CDTSSGT	CDTSGT	CDTCPL	CDTLCPL		CDT	CDTREC

=== Officer of Cadets (OOC) ranks ===
Officers of Cadets do not typically extend past the rank of "Major (AAC)" and is reserved for Regional Assistant Commanders or those with national posistions with the rank of LTCOL (AAC), and the National Assistant Commander holding COL (AAC). All ranks above Major are usually held by members of the Australian Defence Force who are attached to the AAC.

Insignia								
Rank	Colonel (AAC)	Lieutenant Colonel (AAC)	Major (AAC)	Captain (AAC)	Lieutenant (AAC)	Second Lieutenant (AAC)	Unit Assistant/Trainee Officer of Cadets (AAC)	Regional Assistance; Helper
Abbreviation	COL (AAC)	LTCOL (AAC)	MAJ (AAC)	CAPT (AAC)	LT (AAC)	2LT (AAC)	UA/TOOC (AAC)	DAH

=== Former Instructor of Cadets (IOC) ranks ===
Australian Army Cadets (AAC)
Insignia							
Rank	Warrant Officer Class One AAC (no longer in use as of 2020)	Warrant Officer Class Two AAC (no longer in use as of 2020)	Staff Sergeant AAC (phased out as of 2019)	Sergeant AAC (no longer in use as of 2020)	Corporal AAC (no longer in use as of 2020)	Lance Corporal AAC (no longer in use as of 2020)	Trainee Officer of Cadets (as of 2022, only used in some battalions)
Abbreviation	WO1 (AAC)	WO2 (AAC)	SSGT (AAC)	SGT (AAC)	CPL (AAC)	LCPL (AAC)	TOOC

== See also ==
- Australian Air Force Cadets
- Australian Navy Cadets
- Australian Defence Force Cadets
- Cadets (youth program)
