= Disruptive Pattern Camouflage Uniform =

Five-colour military camouflage pattern

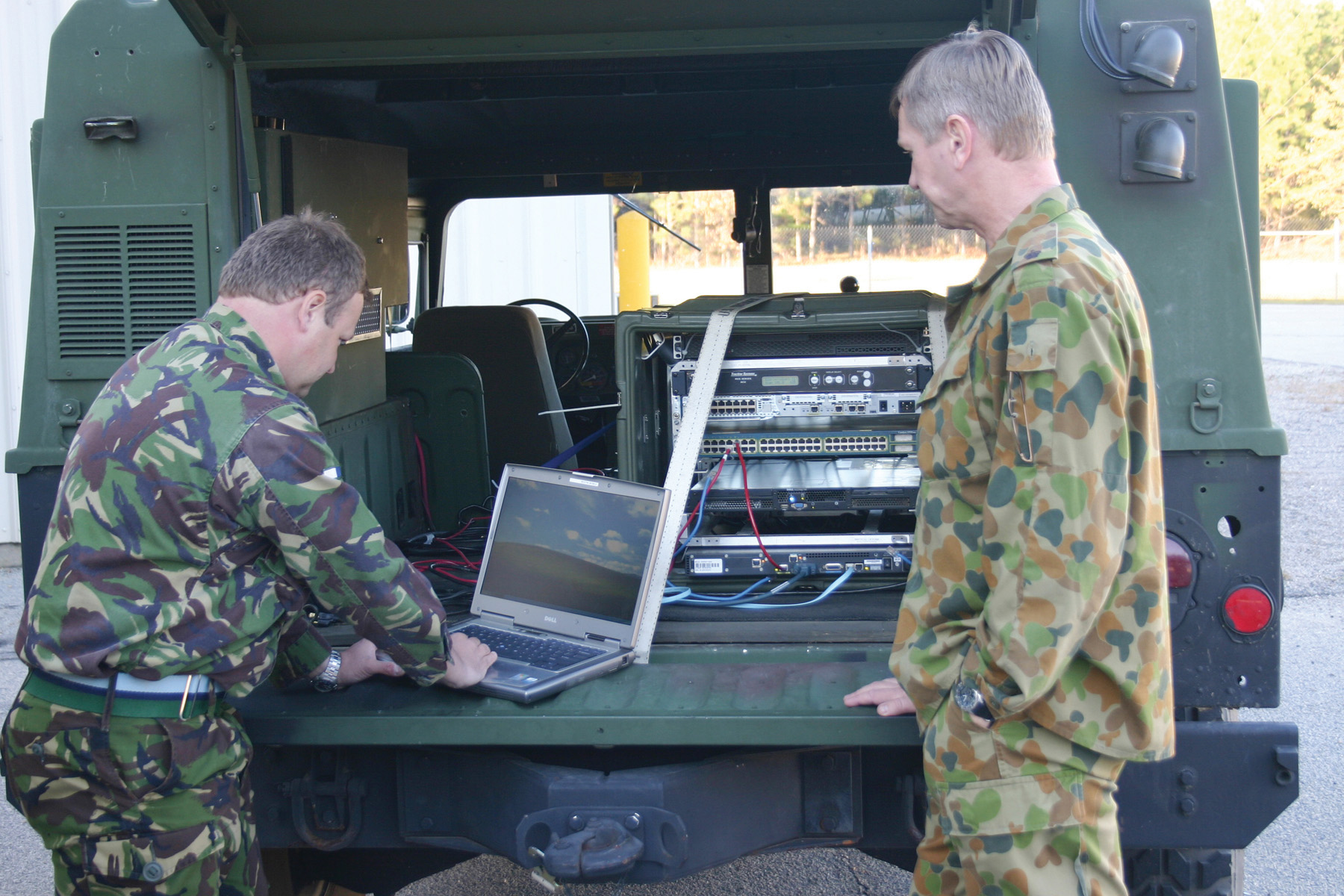
Australian officer on right wearing DPCU in 2005, British officer on left wearing Disruptive Pattern Material

Closeup of the pattern

Disruptive Pattern Camouflage Uniform (DPCU), also nicknamed Auscam, jelly bean camo, or hearts and bunnies is a five-colour military camouflage pattern used by the Australian Defence Force. Replacing the jungle greens used from WWII, it was developed and tested during the late 1970s and early 1980s. The uniform was trialled in 1987, with it being slowly introduced in late 1989, with the last production and discontinuation of the jungle greens being in late 1990. Jungle greens were last issued in late 1991 for Australian Regular Army, and late 1994 for Australian Army Reserve.

The DPCU has mostly been phased out of the Australian Army by the Australian Multicam Camouflage Uniform (AMCU), which uses colour palettes of the DPCU and an Australian-designed multi-camouflage pattern based on MultiCam, following suit to the U.S. Army replacing their Universal Camouflage Pattern for Operational Camouflage Pattern and the British Army replacing their previous Disruptive Pattern Material for Multi-Terrain Pattern. Despite AMCU being the current camouflage pattern of the ADF, DPCU is still worn in service by soldiers and many reserve units in conjunction with the new pattern. Recruits at training establishments during the late 2010s and early 2020s were issued both uniforms during the holdover period before AMCU was officially adopted. 2021 was the last year DPCU was officially issued to recruits.

The DPCU was additionally considered not as effective as AMCU, as it didn't have as good of test scores when finding effectiveness.

As of 2023, the Australian Army Cadets have officially adopted AMCU also, and retaining existing stocks of DPCU field environments. Members of the Australian Army Reserve who are in the Regional Induction Company are still issued DPCU, prior to their basic training at the 1st Recruit Training Battalion, Kapooka NSW.

== Design ==
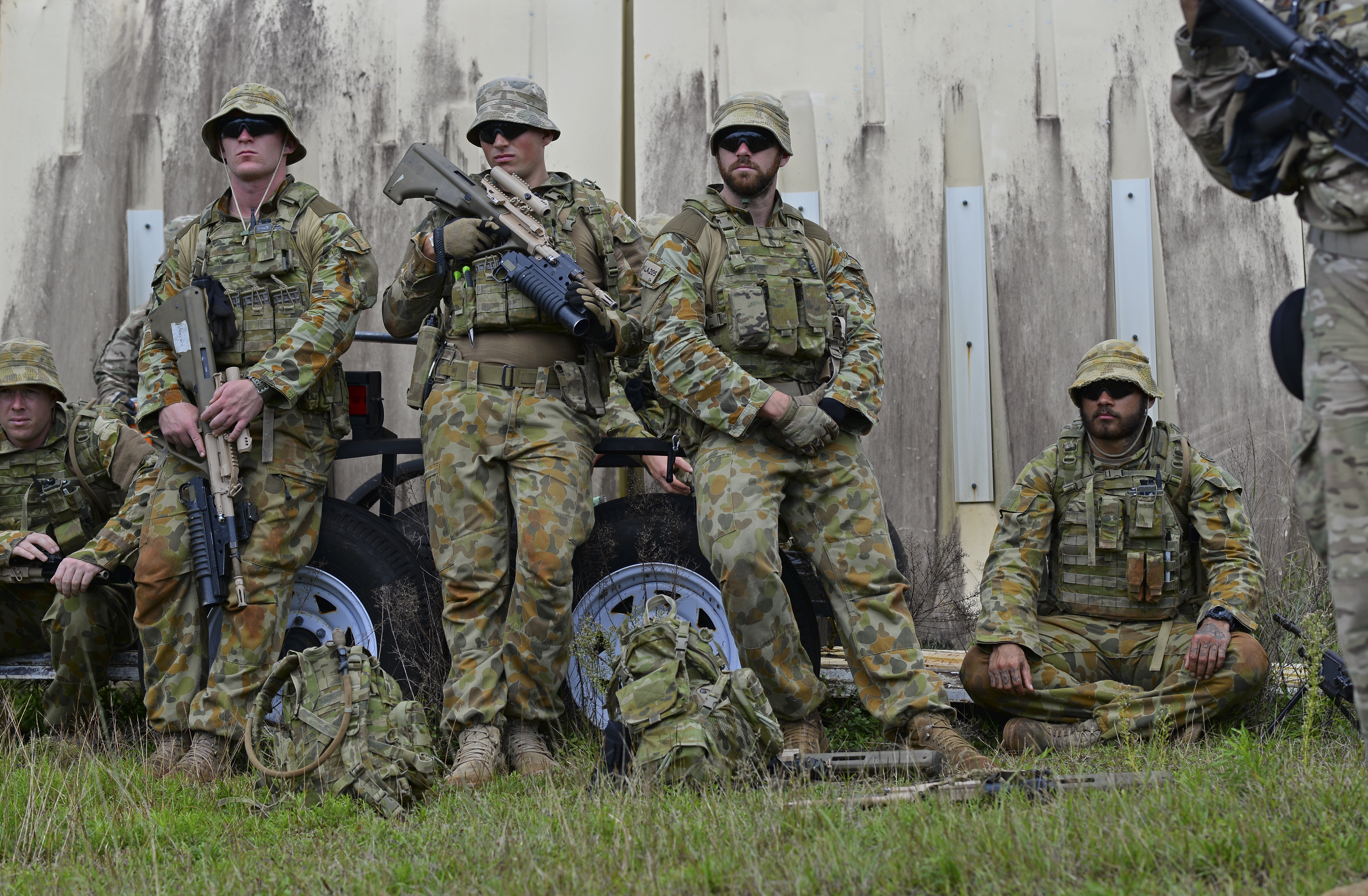
Members of the Royal Australian Air Force on an exercise in Guam in 2017

The first uniforms using the disruptive pattern camouflage (called Disruptive Pattern Camouflage Uniform – DPCU) were issued in 1982. In 1986 the final production version was introduced with a number of changes. It is influenced partly by early US Jungle Camouflage patterns, such as "Duck Hunter"/"Frog-Skin". DPCU was developed following aerial photographs of the Australian terrain to determine which colours and patterns would be most suitable for camouflage uniforms.

The selected five colour pattern consists of a greenish sand coloured background with randomly arranged spots of orange-brown, mid-brown, leaf-green and very dark green overlaid. While a mid-grey tone was included in early test uniforms, this was omitted in later uniforms in favour of a second brown tone.

The standard DPCU works in areas from arid bushland through to tropical jungle all over Australia.

Since the finalisation of the colour scheme, the Army uniform was modified to the standard NATO format, with a single rank slide in the centre of the shirt, zip pockets on the shirt and pants instead of the button-flap original, and larger sleeve pockets to fit unit patches on.

Though outdated and no longer in production, DPCU is still being used in limited numbers in the Australian Defence Force, mostly Royal Australian Navy and reserve formations of the Australian Army (such as the 11th Brigade). In addition to this Australian Army Cadets (AAC) still use older variants of the DPCU uniform as of 2022, but have started the slow shift over to AMCU.

== Variants ==
=== Desert (DPDU) ===
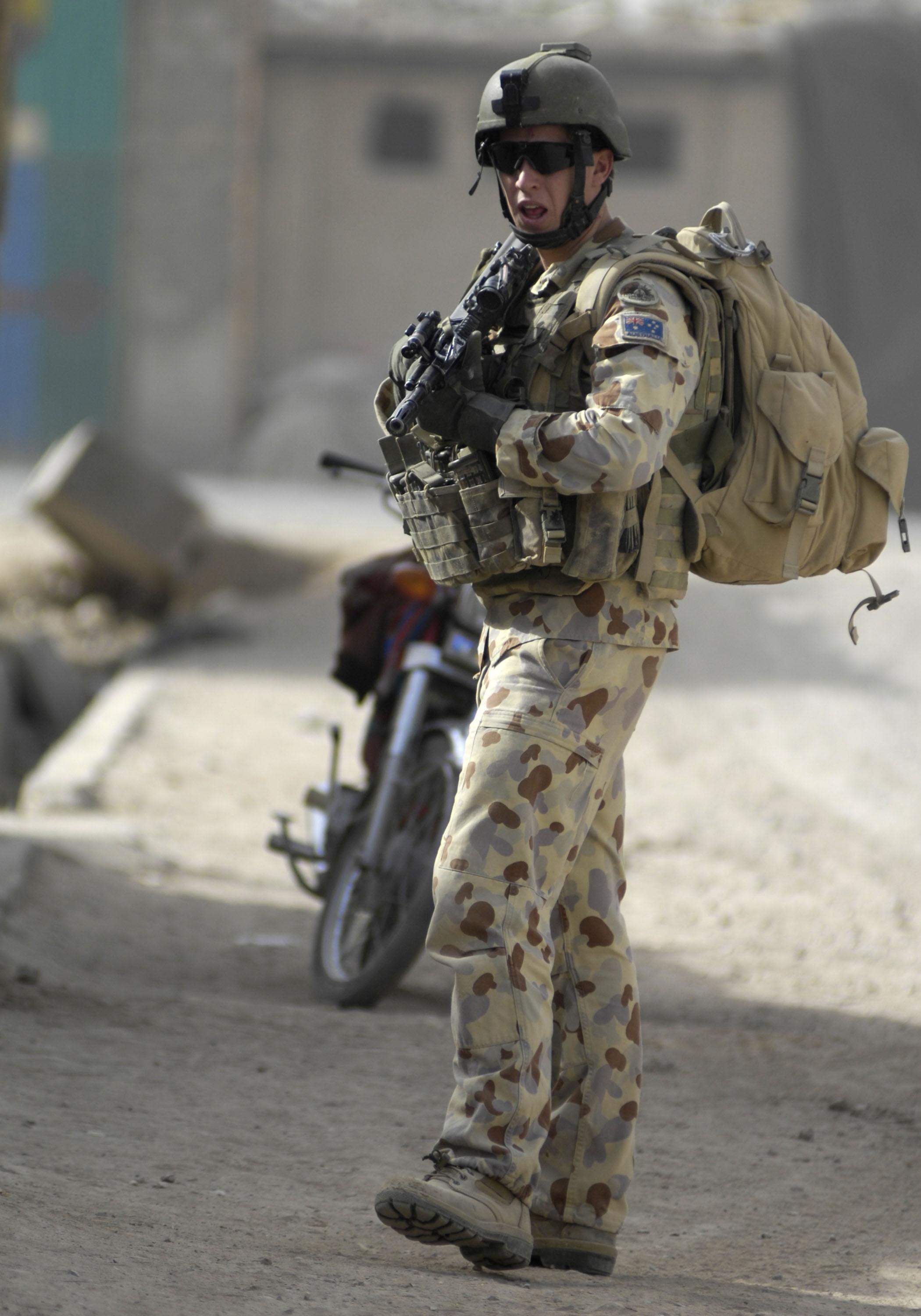
An Australian soldier wearing DPDU in Afghanistan. He utilises the latest version of the DPDU uniform.

Officially named DPDU (Disruptive Pattern Desert Uniform), a DPCU variant designed for desert conditions using different colours, was first tested in 1998 at the Woomera Missile Test Site in South Australia.

The first version, from 2001, was printed in 3 colours (brown and grey on a tan background) with 1/3 of the normal pattern missing and rushed into issue for the Australian Special Air Service Regiment deployed to Afghanistan as part of the International Security Assistance Force (ISAF). A second version from a year later used 5 colours: brown, lime green, grey, and a very light blue on a tan background. This was again issued to SASR in Afghanistan after the first version was found to be too light in colour for the terrain. This was followed by a third issue in: brown, grey, very light blue and purple on a yellow background. The cut was changed in the shirt with the bottom pockets being omitted and placed on the sleeves.

This was replaced in 2006 by the current-issue DPDU. The colours remain the same as the previous DPDU. Changes to the uniform include repositioning of shoulder straps to the chest, the changes of the chest pockets and cargo pockets from the button-fastened flap of the pocket to zips and minor changes to the sleeve pockets. This the current type issued to all ADF personnel serving overseas in arid/desert regions such as Iraq. The Department of Defence retired the pattern in 2010.

==== Midpoint - DPMU (Variant of DPDU) ====
A new DPDU variant known as 'Mid Point", later called DPMU was to be progressively introduced into selected service in Afghanistan (2010). Army chief Ken Gillespie toured Afghanistan showing off the new uniform. The pattern remained the same as that used for the DPCU and DPDU but with a light lime-yellow base colour, light grey, sand, olive-green and red-brown. The new variant was designed to overcome issues associated with operating in and around the "green belt" areas of Afghanistan (particularly in corn fields) where the DPDU was too light in colour but where the DPCU was too green for open areas. Trials however, showed that in most areas the original DPCU performed more effectively than the new Midpoint camouflage and it was not adopted. One criticism was that the new camouflage used colours that were still too biased towards desert operations. Australian special forces operating in Afghanistan have been seen wearing Crye's Multicam camouflage. A trial of MultiCam was undertaken and the decision made to broaden this trial for Australian operations in Afghanistan. In 2011, a contract was awarded to Crye to design a camouflage pattern with Multicam's effective style of pattern but with colours changed to resemble the original DPCU. In October 2012, Australian troops about to deploy to Afghanistan were photographed wearing uniforms in the new pattern. Unlike the UK's MTP camouflage which was also based on the Multicam pattern, the changes have been confined to the darkest and lightest shapes which now mimic the familiar "bunny ears" or jelly bean" shapes of the original DPCU.

=== Naval (DPNU) ===
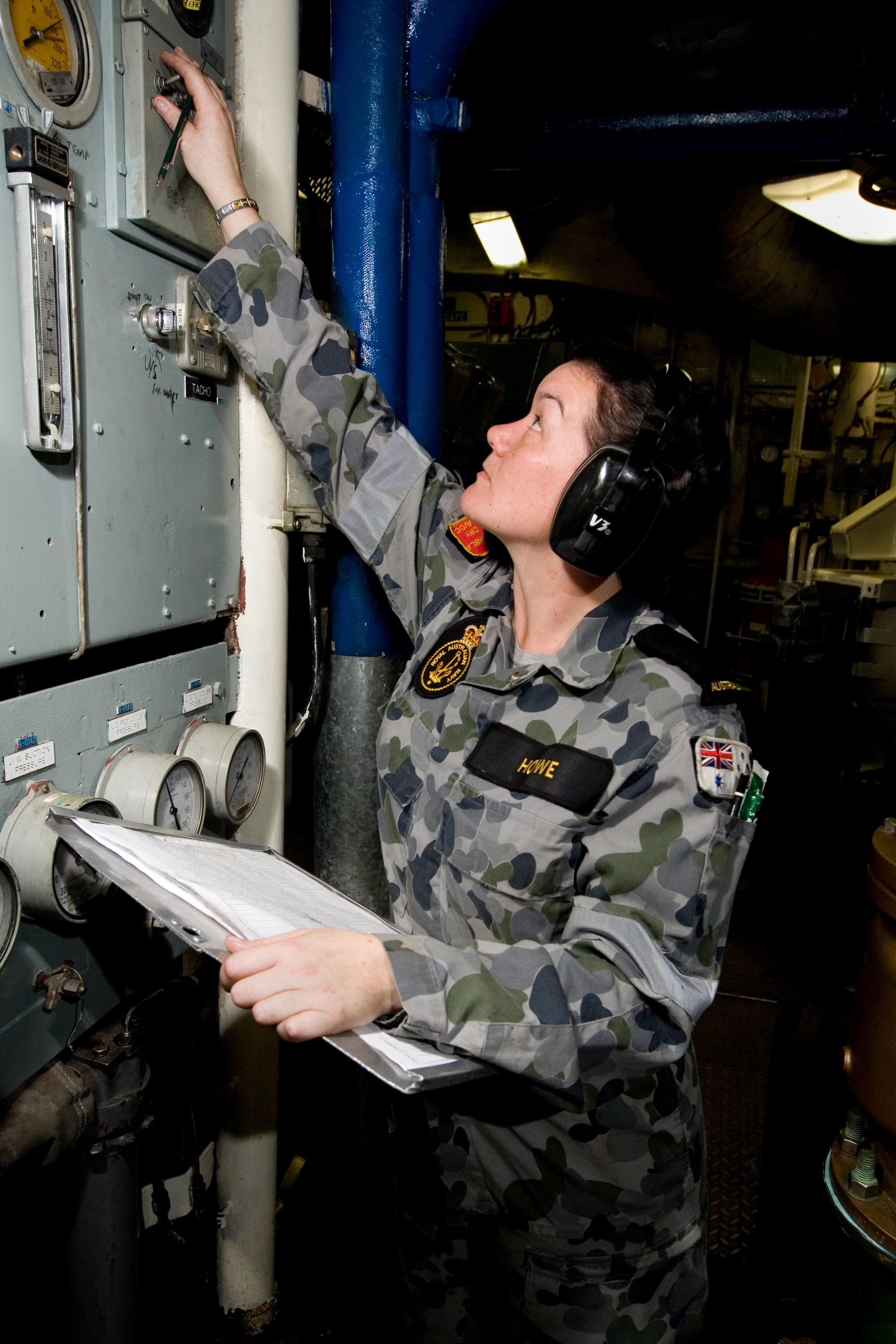
Royal Australian Seaman wearing the DPNU.

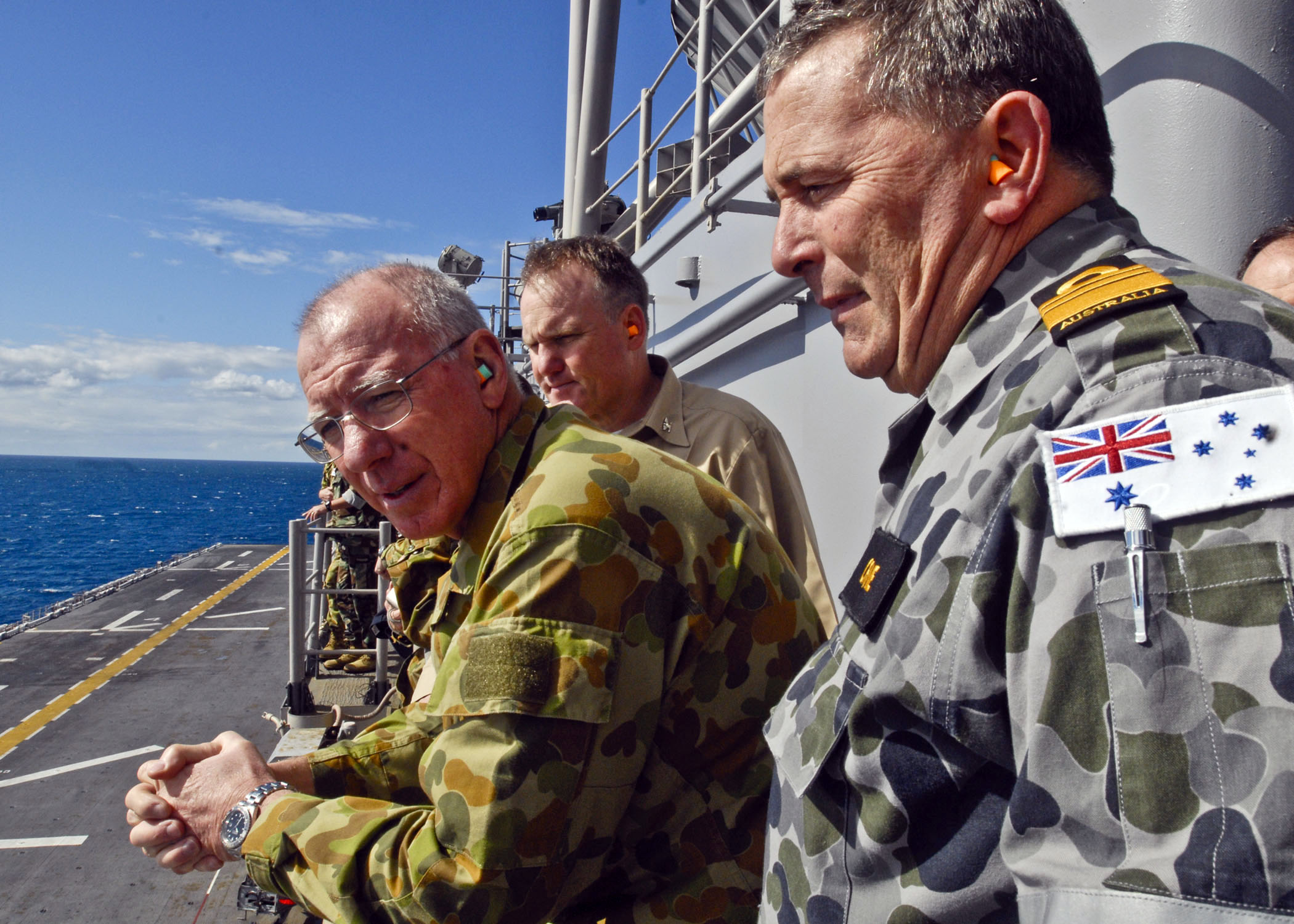
Disruptive Pattern Naval Uniform (grey) on the right, worn by VADM Russ Crane.

A naval version, consisting of the "littoral colours" of various shades of grey with greens, officially named Disruptive Pattern Naval Uniform (DPNU), has been adopted by the Royal Australian Navy. Before the uniform was introduced, there was some confusion as to why a disruptive pattern was used at all, given that the uniform incorporated reflective tape on the upper arms to make the wearer more visible if they should fall overboard, though the reflective tape is placed low enough on the arm to be covered when the sleeves are rolled up. The primary reason for the use of the AUSCAM pattern is not to provide camouflage, but to align with the other services which use the distinctly Australian pattern, making personnel identifiable as Australian, and through the use of the littoral colours as naval personnel. It will replace several sets of other clothing, including the grey fire resistant overalls and the blue Action Working Dress (AWD). RAN personnel previously issued DPCU uniform (such as clearance divers) will continue to be issued DPCU kit in addition to their DPNU uniforms.

=== Opposing Force (DPCU) ===
During the early 1990s a modified DPCU colour scheme was trialled to be used for OPFOR units during force vs force training exercises. This pattern was in the same style as the standard DPCU but in tones of red and brown, supposedly resembling a "Russian" style pattern. Colours used were: dark brown, mid-brown, light brown and blood red, all on a tan background. It was used sparingly during several exercises but not issued widely due to the cost associated with fielding a separate uniform with only minor colour changes solely for use as an OPFOR uniform. Supplies had dried up by 1995 and the pattern was officially taken out of service in 1998. However, the pattern was briefly put back into production in 2007.

OPFOR DPCU was found to be very effective in the red sands of the Australian desert.

=== Air Force (GPU) ===
A variant of the DPCU pattern was proposed for the Royal Australian Air Force as a General Purpose Uniform designated as the Air Force Disruptive Pattern Uniform (AFDPU). This experimental pattern was the same as the DPCU with a colour palette consisting of a light grey background with one of the brown colours replaced by dark grey. It was not adopted, however a new variant (called DPAFU – Disruptive Pattern Air Force Uniform) commenced user trials in late 2013 within the RAAF. This has adopted a more 'digi-cam' style, similar to that of the US, as opposed to the "hearts and bunnies" of the current DPCU format.

In 2014 the RAAF announced the General Purpose Uniform will be issued to all members as the new working dress for non warlike environments.

== Garments ==
Garments issued in DPCU have included uniform jackets and trousers, Howard jumpers with DPCU components, Jump smocks (for Paratroops), a wet weather ensemble and cold weather ensemble under land 125 phase 3C, a pre-land 125 wet weather ensemble and earlier a waxed cotton (Japara) rain jacket, almost always referred to as a Japarra. Common specialist uniforms include tanker, mounted and aviation variants of the standard DPCU uniform jackets and trousers, and flight-suits made in DPCU and DPDU.

Head dress has included bush hats, wide brimmed bush hats ("boonie" hats) and a peaked cap with a fold up neck flap referred to as a kepi cap (worn only by members of units which operate armoured vehicles and by Regional Force Surveillance Units).

Other more niche issued garments include reversible DPCU/Desert Camouflage Uniform jackets for use by SF early in the Iraq war, extreme cold weather uniforms in DPCU (for use in Afghanistan's mountains in winter), Ghillie suit/Yowie suit jackets and field hats made with shredded DPCU material, specialist sniper trousers, as well as specialist sniper boots with DPCU material covering the body of the boot, and the NBC ensemble including jacket, trousers, and boot covers.

Several variants of the DPCU/DPDU uniform (mainly under armour variants) produced by private companies (mainly Platatac) have been trialed and fielded by SF in Afghanistan and Iraq, a DPNU variant was also produced.

Several Australian companies make their own garments in DPCU, DPDU and DPNU, notable companies include Bruck Textiles, Platatac, Sord and TAS.

== Equipment ==
Rucksacks Issued in DPCU include the 'M88' and modified versions, including 'M94' revisions and ALICE modification. Other packs include pre-land-125 Para ALICE packs and Land 125 Alice packs. smaller packs include day-packs, land 125 zip on hydration and daypacks for land 125 vest and Alice packs (slim, large and large divided variants). Specialist packs include older and newer variants Raven radio packs in DPCU, Medical packs, Officers tote bags, and special forces specific packs including the SAS mk6 pack.

The modular belt webbing/load carriage harness system is produced in DPCU, both the '88' version and the '94' revision, and includes steyr, minimi, water bottle, bumbag, grenade, wound dressing, and back pouches in DPCU, as well as a belt and harness in khaki. More specialist pouches include Minimi 'panic' pouches, Browning high power holsters, Medical tri-fold pouches and Steiner radio pouches.

The Land 125 Individual Combat Load Carriage Equipment was produced in DPCU and DPDU including commando and standard variants of a vest with h-harness adapter, padded belt, 2 and 3 mag pouches, horizontal and vertical utility zip pouches, medium and large utility clip pouches, F1 grenade pouches, double and triple 40mm pouches, Entrenching tool pouches, leg panels, Browning high power holster, and pistol magazine double pouches. in addition to this, as discussed earlier hydration/day packs were made to be accommodated by the vest.

Body armour carriers including individual body armour used with the land 125 and older webbing sets and pilot and crew body armours were produced in DPCU and DPDU.

CBAS (Combat body Armour system) version 1 and 2 body armour was made in DPDU, MCBAS (Modular combat body Armour system) was made in DPDU and DPCU. These used the land 125 series of pouches for load carriage.

Personnel Armor System for Ground Troops helmet covers were produced in DPCU, DPNU and early DPDU (1st and 2nd series). Enhanced Combat Helmet (Australia) covers have been produced in DPCU, DPNU and 3rd series DPDU.

Some more niche equipment produced in DPCU includes Browning high power shoulder holsters, pre-land 125 tactical vests, trial chest rigs, SAS patrol chest rigs and vests, SF armour carriers and pouches (early 2000s).

Private companies also produce body armour carriers, pouches, packs etc. in DPCU, DPDU and DPNU, most notably Platatac and Sord.

== See also ==
- Uniforms of the Australian Army
