= Airman Battle System-Ground =

The Airman Battle System Ground uniform (ABSGU), is a utility uniform for the United States Air Force. It was made from 2008 to be issued to combat airmen instead of the Airman Battle Uniform because the ABU lacks flame resistance. By 2011 the Air Force was issuing MultiCam pattern uniforms to combat airmen being deployed to the Middle East in place of the Airman Battle System-Ground.
