= Airman Battle Uniform =

United States military combat uniform

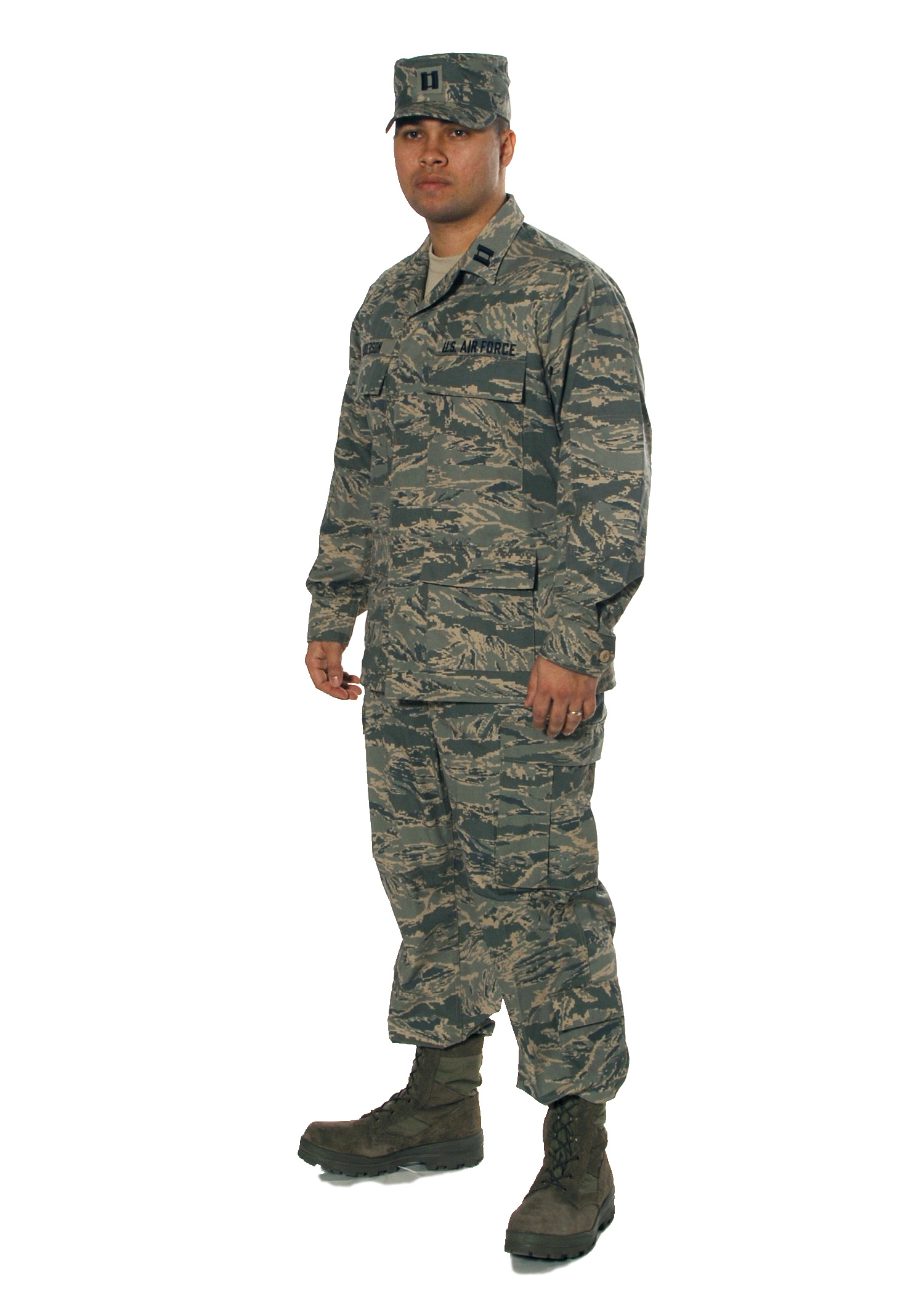
- A captain of the United States Air Force wearing the Airman Battle Uniform
- Type: Military camouflage patterned uniform
- Place of origin: United States

Service history
- In service: 2007–2021 (USAF/USSF) (Note: Formally; limited prototype testing from 2006 to 2007. Used alongside the Battle Dress Uniform (BDU) until 2011. Was discontinued in 2021.) 2016–2028 (Civil Air Patrol)
- Used by: United States Air Force; United States Space Force; See Users for non-U.S. users
- Wars: Global War on Terrorism; Russian Invasion of Ukraine

Production history
- Designed: 2003–2006
- Produced: 2006–present
- Variants: Airman Battle Shirt (ABS); Airman Battle System-Ground (ABS-G)

The Airman Battle Uniform (ABU) is a U.S. camouflage combat uniform formerly worn by members of the United States Air Force, United States Space Force, and some civilian employees of the U.S. Department of the Air Force until April 2021. It replaced the Battle Dress Uniform and Desert Camouflage Uniform on November 1, 2011, after a four-year phase-in period.

On May 14, 2018, The U.S. Air Force announced that all airmen will transition from the ABU to the OCP Uniform. All airmen have been permitted to wear the OCP Uniform since October 1, 2018, and the wear out date for the ABU was April 1, 2021. The ABU is currently worn by the Civil Air Patrol, but is being phased out in favor of the OCP Uniform.

== History ==
=== 2000s ===
==== 2003–2006: Prototypes and testing ====
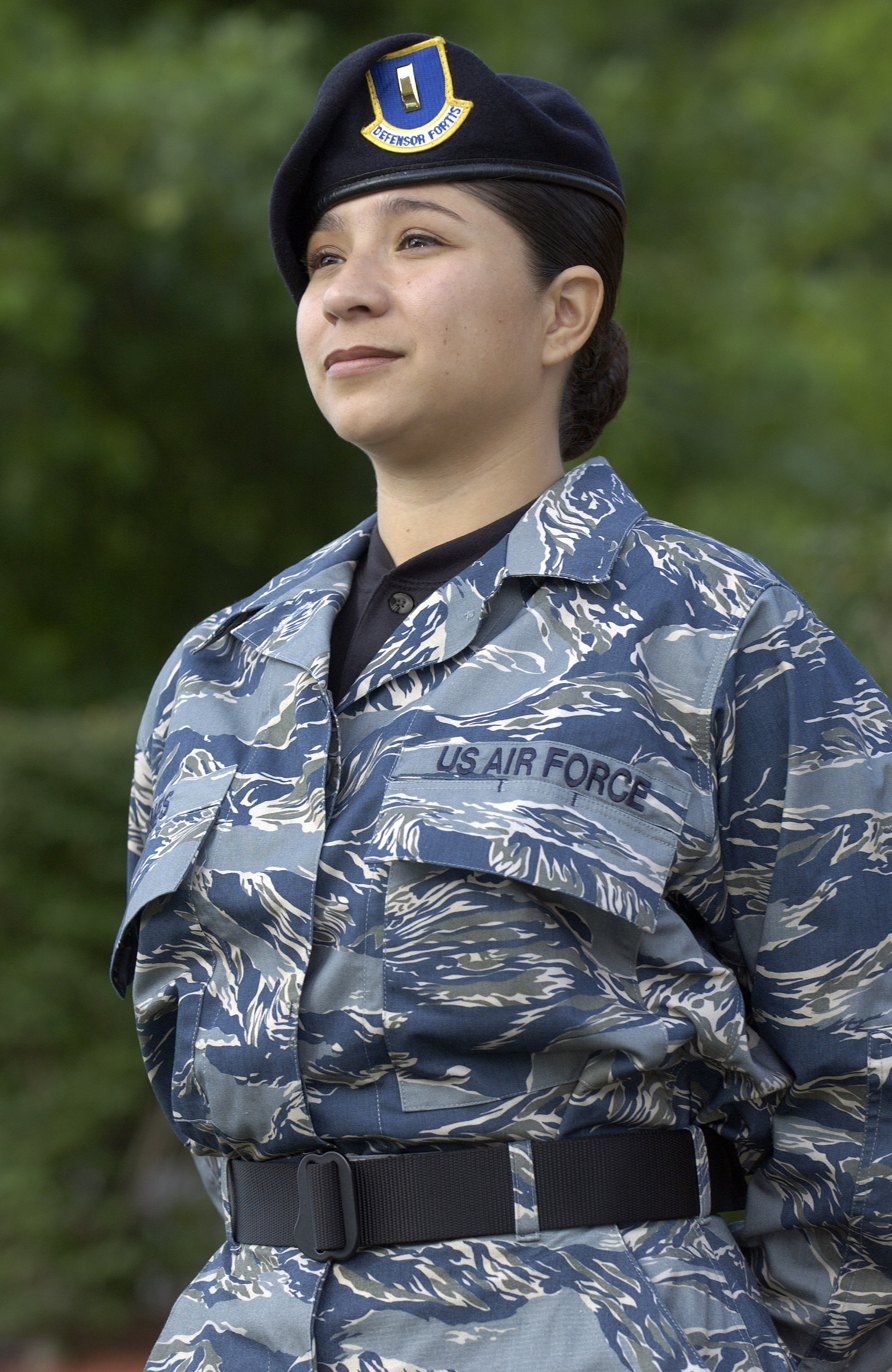
Experimental Blue tiger stripe camouflage

The first prototype of the ABU was unveiled in the summer of 2003. The early uniform prototypes consisted of trousers, an embroidered undershirt, and a blouse. The prototype camouflage pattern was a blue/gray, tiger stripe pattern, based upon the tigerstripe uniforms worn by airmen during the Vietnam War.

After months of wear testing, Air Force officials revised the color scheme and camouflage pattern due to feedback received from airmen. A new semi-pixelated tiger-stripe pattern, with added "ragged pixel-like edges", is introduced as a new "test" pattern.

The new semi-pixelated tiger-stripe pattern would trade its dominant blue overtones for a more subdued palette, similar to the Universal Camouflage Pattern, but with some added slate blue tones. The uniform maintains a similar cut to the previous Battle Dress Uniform, rather than the contemporary Army Combat Uniform. The fabric was made in 50-50 nylon and cotton in order to reduce the need for summer/winter-type uniforms.

==== 2007: ABU Roll-out ====
On October 2, 2007, the Air Force began issuing the ABU to enlisted trainees in Basic Military Training at Lackland Air Force Base, was issued to the Class of 2012 at the United States Air Force Academy on June 26, 2008, and was made available for all airmen. Since September 2007, it had been issued to airmen deploying to locations in the CENTCOM area of responsibility.

==== 2008: Airman Battle Ensemble (ABE) ====
Airmen in non-traditional ground combat roles began to be issued the Airman Battle Ensemble - a coat, pants and battle shirt in flame retardant materials in a tactical configuration. This was not a new uniform, but additional pieces for the ABUs that would help "Airmen who perform their mission outside the wire in close coordination with ground forces."

==== 2009: Airman Battle Shirt (ABS) / Airman Battle System - Ground (ABS-G) introduced ====
Starting in 2009, airmen who were in ground combat roles, such as Security Forces, were issued the new Airman Battle Shirt (ABS). The ABS was based on the Army Combat Shirt (ACS). Like the ACS, the ABS is a stand-alone shirt designed specifically for use with Improved Outer Tactical Vest armor in warm and hot weather. It is intended to greatly increase user comfort through the use of lightweight, moisture-wicking, and breathable fabrics. The ABS features the same tiger stripe pattern on the sleeves. The Airman Battle System - Ground was the successor to the ABE and was an upgrade with more pockets and having been tested by real airmen in battle conditions.

The rollout of the ABE and ABS-G uniform pieces was uneven and not without problems for airmen being deployed as the regulations were often confusing and varied from CONUS commands to deployment commands.

=== 2010s ===
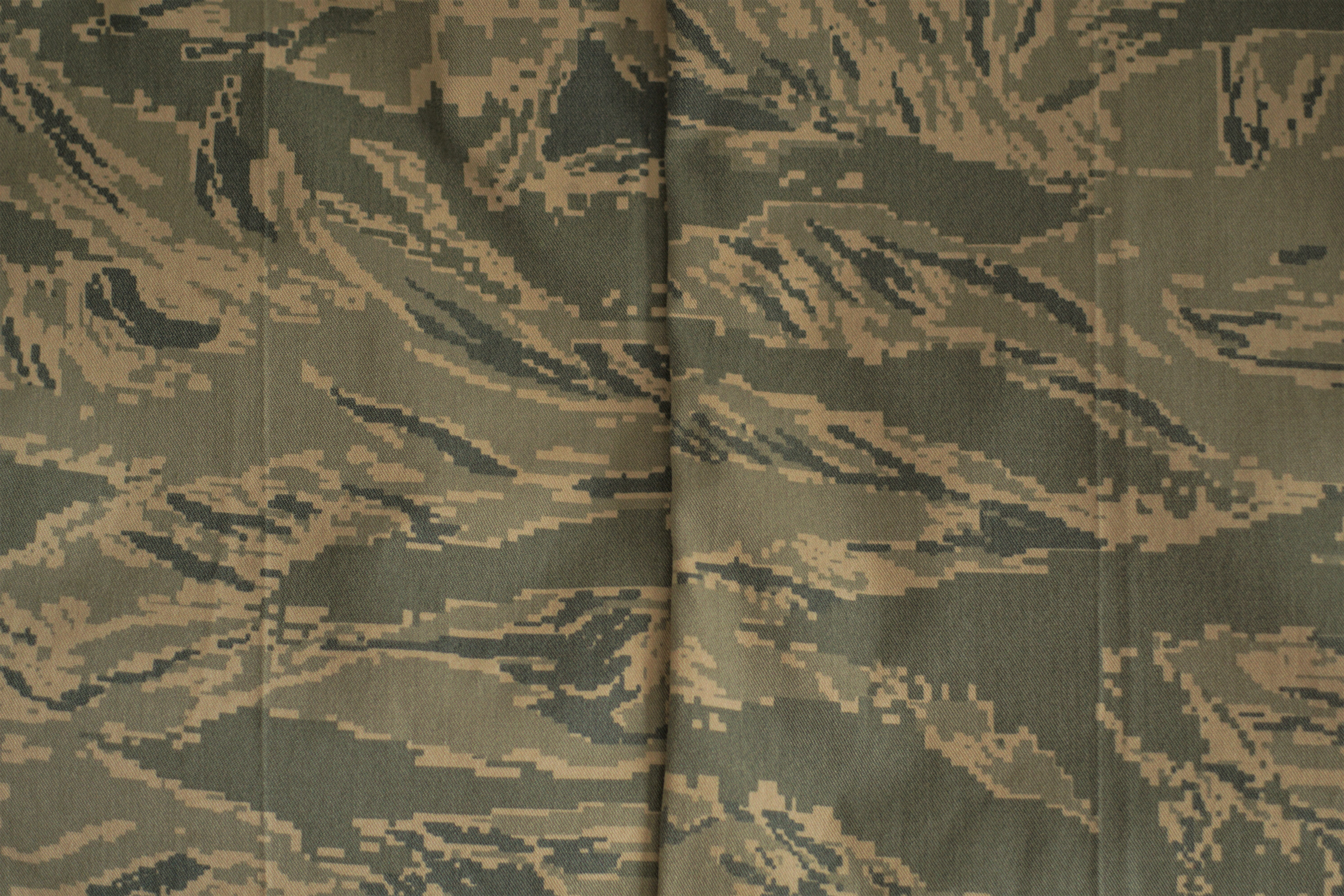
Original-issue 50% nylon–50% cotton twill weave fabric printed with the ABU camouflage pattern. Due to complaints regarding the original fabric's weight and heat-retention, a thinner, ripstop-weave, ABU-patterned fabric in the same 50/50 NYCO blend would be introduced in 2012, known variously as the "Improved ABU," "IABU," "Ripstop ABU," or "RABU."

In 2010, the Operation Enduring Freedom Pattern Army Combat Uniform was authorized to replace the Airman Battle Uniform for airmen in the War in Afghanistan.

In June 2011, The Air Force Times released the announcement of a summer weight ABU to be available in 2012. The Improved Airman Battle Uniform will be made of a 50–50 nylon-cotton blend and was composed of the same material used by the Army for the ACU. Just like the ABU, the IABU is machine washable and also wrinkle resistant. Chief of Staff of the Air Force Gen. Norton A. Schwartz gave approval of the IABU coat and pants which will be available to trainees at Basic Military Training first.

The ABU was fully phased in on October 1, 2011, completely replacing the BDU and DCU though most airmen had been wearing the ABU for several years by that point.

==== 2016: Civil Air Patrol adopts the ABU ====
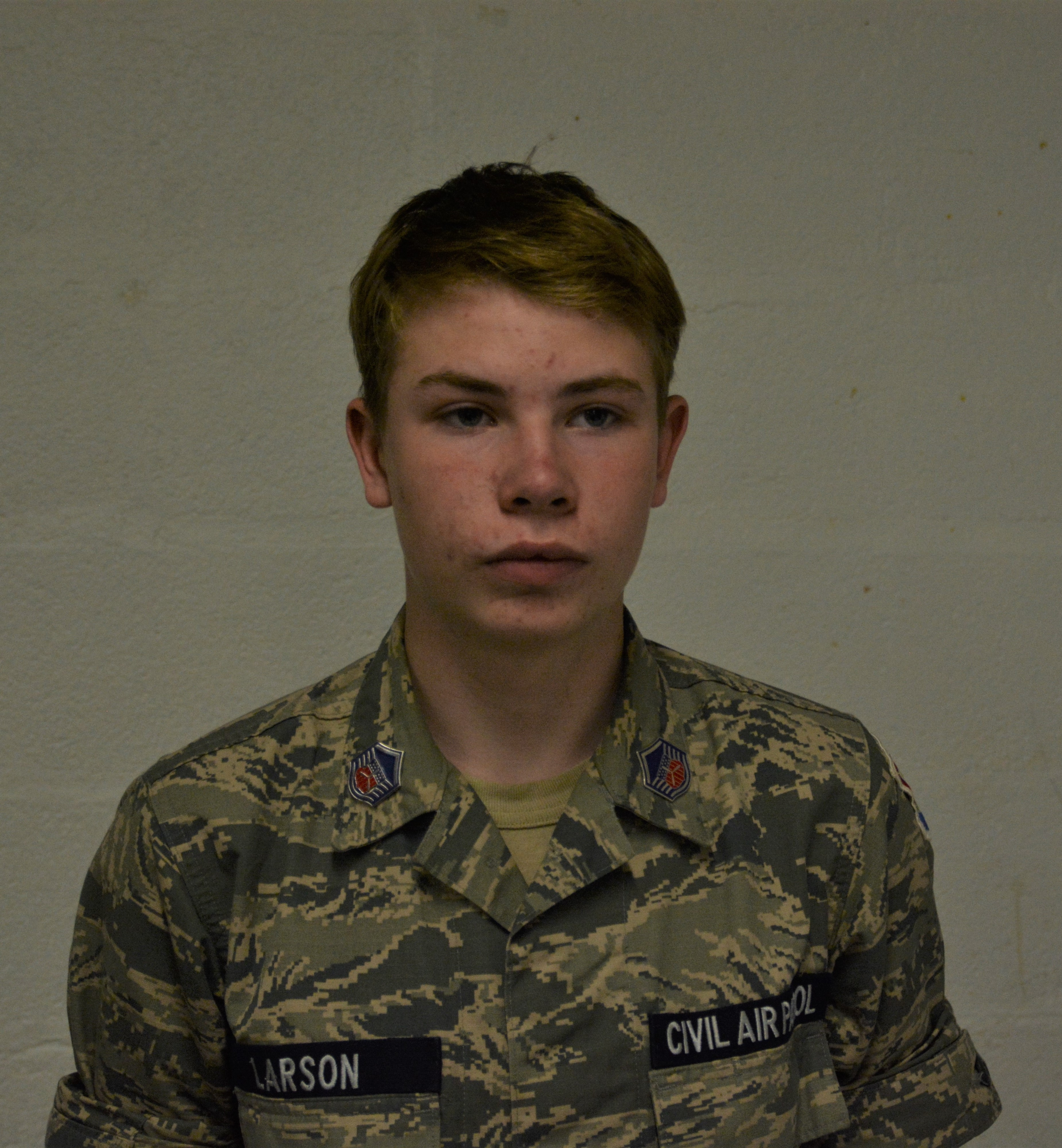
Civil Air Patrol cadet wearing Airman Battle Uniform (ABU)

The Air Force's civilian auxiliary, Civil Air Patrol, wear-tested the ABU in late 2015, and in May 2016, the national commander of the Civil Air Patrol issued a memorandum allowing the wear of the ABU effective June 15, 2016. However, the uniform is worn with dark blue background and light silver lettering name and branch tapes and black boots in order to distinguish CAP personnel. In 2025, a dark blue "tactical cap" style hat was made optional for wear, owing to a shortage of ABU pattern fabric.

==== 2018: Switch to Operational Camouflage Pattern ====
All airmen have been authorized to wear the Operational Camouflage Pattern instead of ABUs since October 1, 2018. Recruits in basic training and cadets in Air Force Reserve Officer Training Corps, and Officer Training School started being issued OCPs on October 1, 2019. The Airman Battle Uniform was no longer authorized to wear after April 1, 2021.

==== 2019: Use by the United States Space Force ====
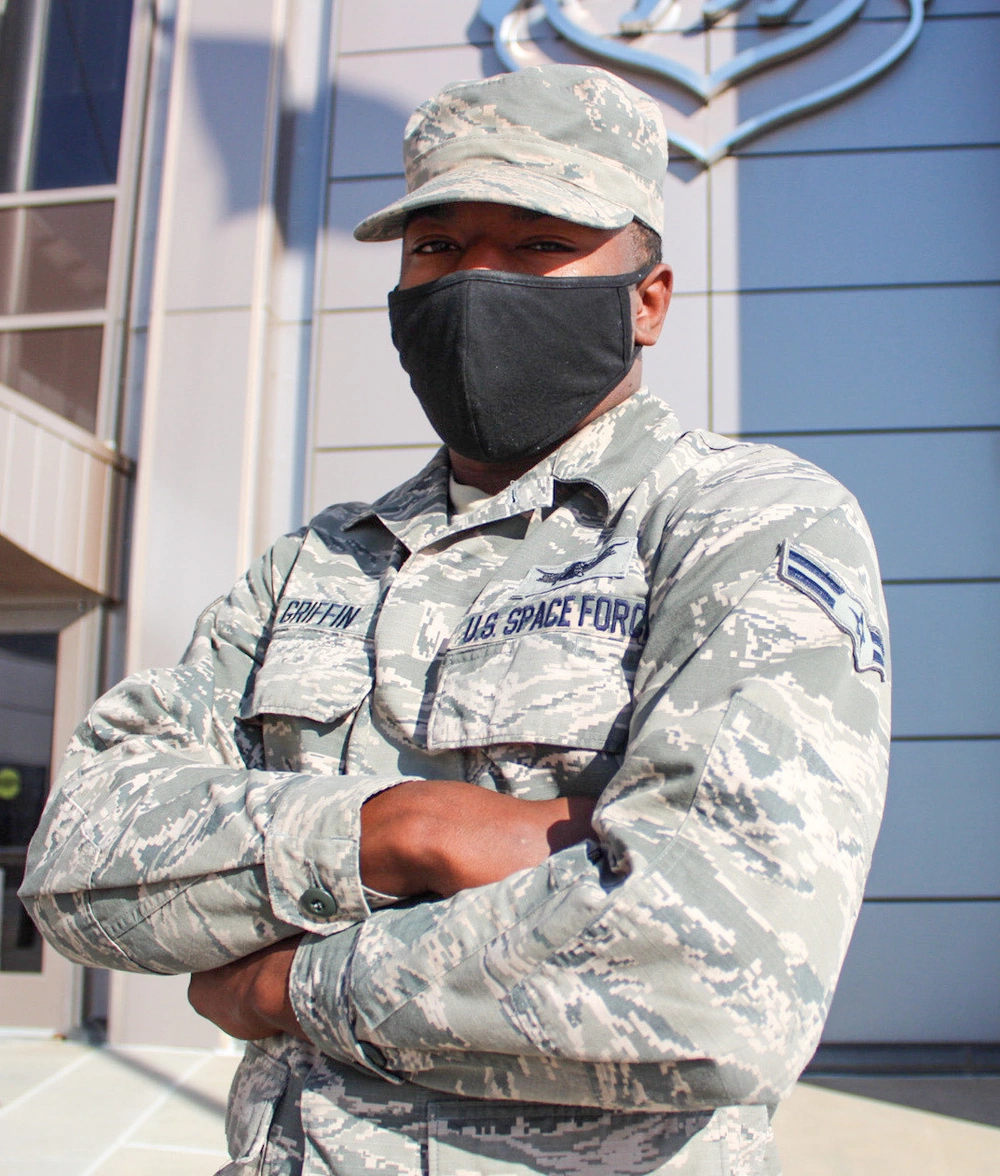
A United States Space Force member wearing the Airman Battle Uniform with appropriate Space Force accoutrements during COVID-19 pandemic in 2020.

From 2019 to 2021, the ABU was authorized for wear, alongside the Operational Camouflage Pattern (OCP) uniform, by United States Space Force (USSF) personnel. USSF personnel replaced the "U.S. AIR FORCE" nametape with a "U.S. SPACE FORCE" nametape, retaining the nametape's ABU-pattern, "midnight blue" block lettering, and position over the left breast pocket. All other aspects of the uniform remained identical to USAF wear. While OCPs were authorized for wear from the 2019 establishment of the USSF, the USAF ABU wear-out date was not until 2021; as such, USSF personnel were permitted to wear the ABU until the official USAF wear-out date.

=== 2020s ===
==== 2022: Use by Ukraine ====
A limited number of Ukrainian Armed Forces personnel have been photographed wearing the ABU during the 2022 Russian invasion of Ukraine.

==== 2025: Civil Air Patrol switches to OCP Uniform ====
On November 4, 2025, the national commander of the Civil Air Patrol issued an interim change letter to the CAP uniform regulations to allow for wear of the OCP uniform. The ABU remains authorized for wear until October 31, 2028.

== Features and attributes ==
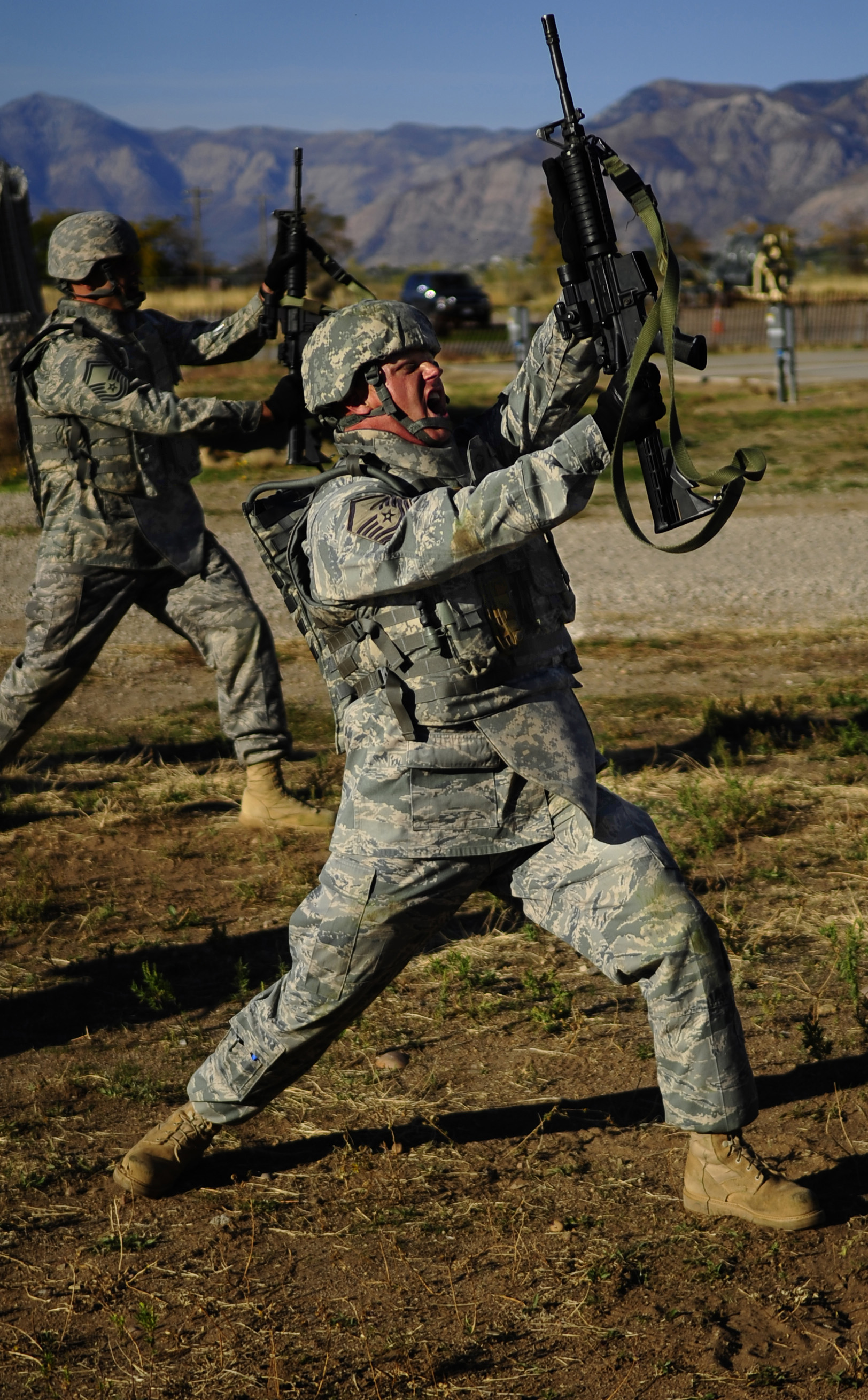
U.S. airmen in 2010 wearing the Airman Battle Uniform

The Airman Battle Uniform is similar to the Universal Camouflage Pattern (UCP) in color, with the inclusion of slate blue, but is otherwise nearly identical to the BDU cut. The ABU was worn with sage green combat boots. The ABU does have essential NIR (near-infra red) qualities, and the sleeves are authorized to be rolled up.

Overview of the Airman Battle Uniform was as follows:

- Headwear
  - Patrol cap.
  - Boonie cover was available for the ABU for use in deployed locations.
  - Organizational ballcaps were authorized for RED HORSE and Combat Arms Training and Maintenance personnel.
  - Berets were authorized for Special Warfare, Security Forces, and Combat Aviation Advisers.
  - Sage-green or black watch cap for cold climate environments with outerwear.
- Sand T-shirt
- Blouse
  - All insignia, including occupational badges (aeronautical wings, occupational badges, etc.), were embroidered in midnight-blue thread with urban-gray background with the exception of rank insignia for 2nd Lieutenant and Major, which incorporated brown thread.
  - Name and service tapes were embroidered in midnight-blue thread on ABU patterned background tapes.
  - Chaplain, aeronautical, space, cyber, missile, occupational badges, duty shields, commander's badge, and weapons school patches were authorized.
- Outerwear such as APECS parka and sage green fleece were authorized for the ABU
- Sand rigger's belt
- Trousers
- Sage green combat boots
  - DLA green socks.

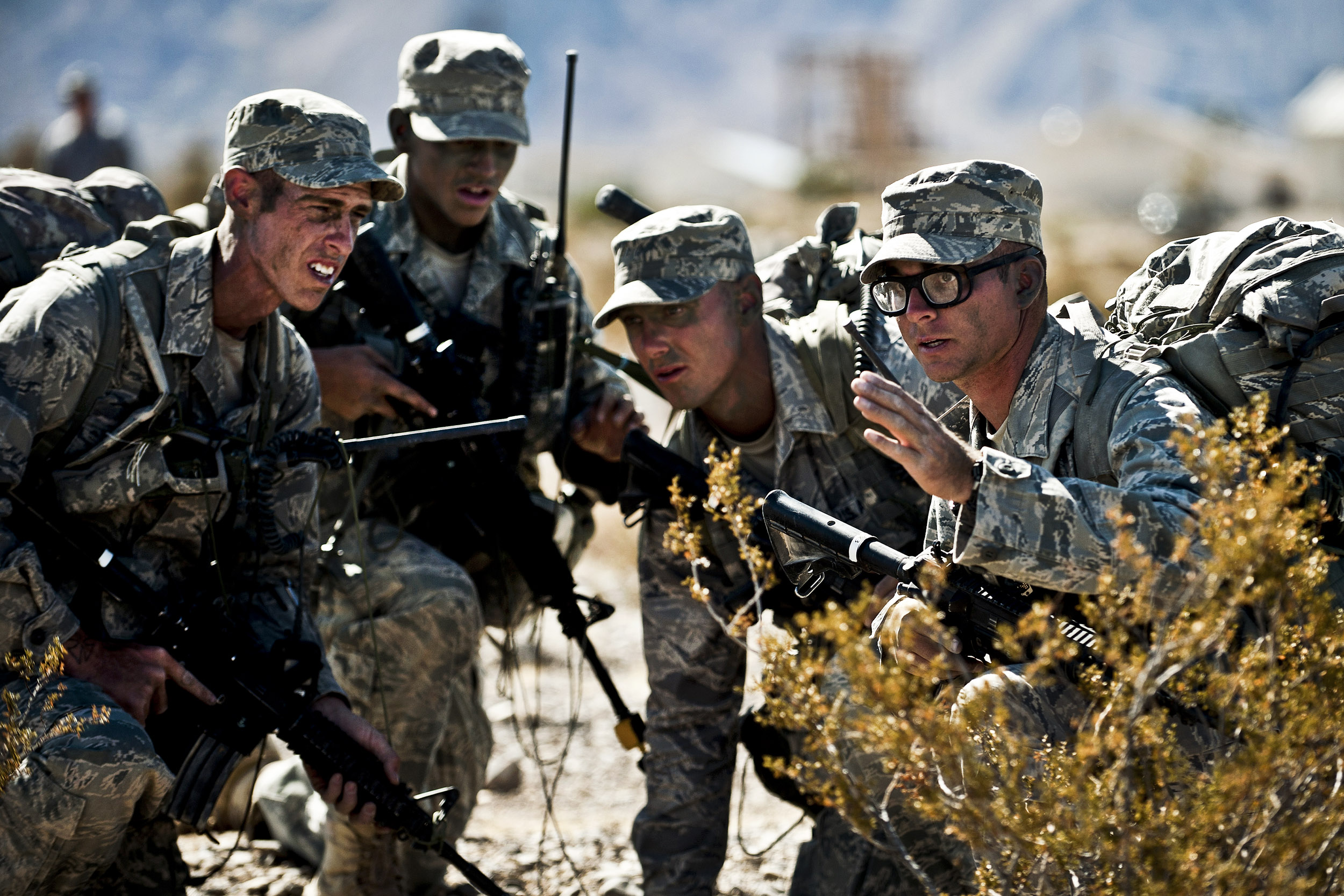
U.S. airmen wearing ABUs on an exercise in 2011

Backpacks and other accessories must be sage, black, or ABU pattern.

== Users ==
- Dominican Republic: Worn by Dominican Air Force.
- Ukraine: In limited service
- United States:
  - United States Air Force: Former standard camouflage uniform of US Airmen from 2007 to 2021. It is still authorized for wear by members of the Civil Air Patrol, the official civilian auxiliary of the U.S. Air Force, until 2028.
  - United States Space Force: Worn from 2019 to 2021.
  - Air Force Junior Reserve Officer Training Corps: Many AFJROTC units/squadrons may use retired United States Air Force ABUs, sometimes with and sometimes without Hook-and-loop fastener places for the cadet's last name to be displayed. Some of the ABUs may say, "AFJROTC" or on rare occasions, "U.S. AIR FORCE", primarily for instructors or teachers.

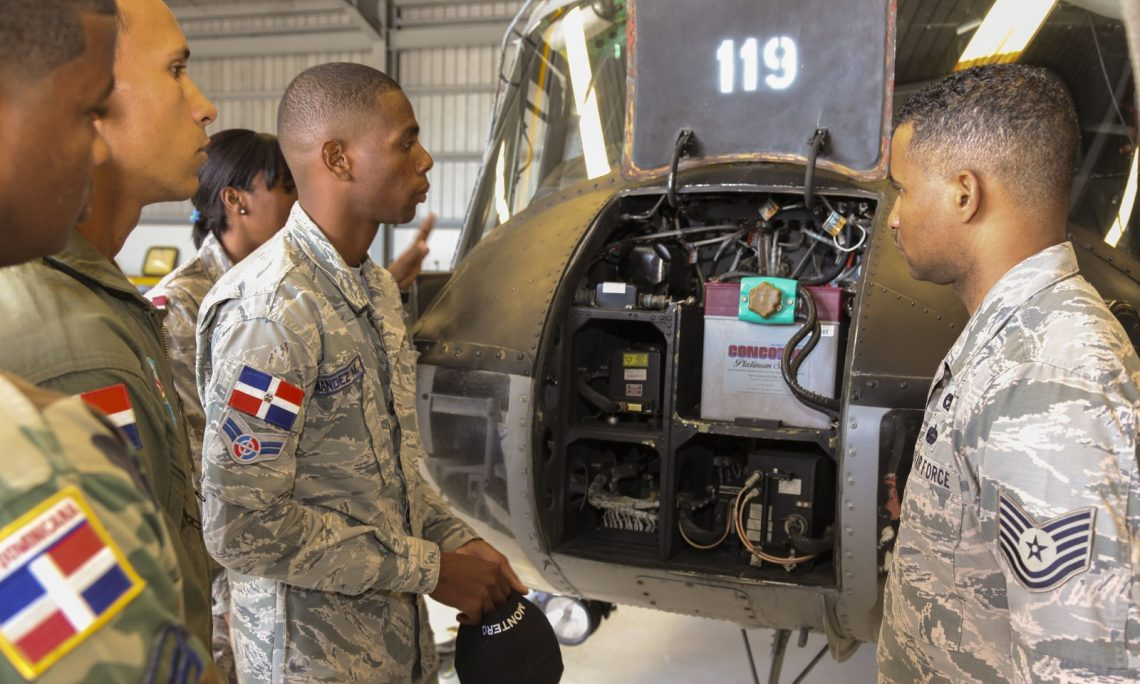
A U.S. airman and Dominican airmen in front of a UH-1N.

== See also ==
=== Current U.S. uniforms ===
- Army Combat Uniform
- Marine Corps Combat Utility Uniform
- Navy Working Uniform
- Operational Dress Uniform (U.S. Coast Guard)

=== Former U.S. uniforms ===
- Battle Dress Uniform
- Desert Battle Dress Uniform
- Desert Combat Uniform
- Desert Night Camouflage
