= General Purpose Uniform =

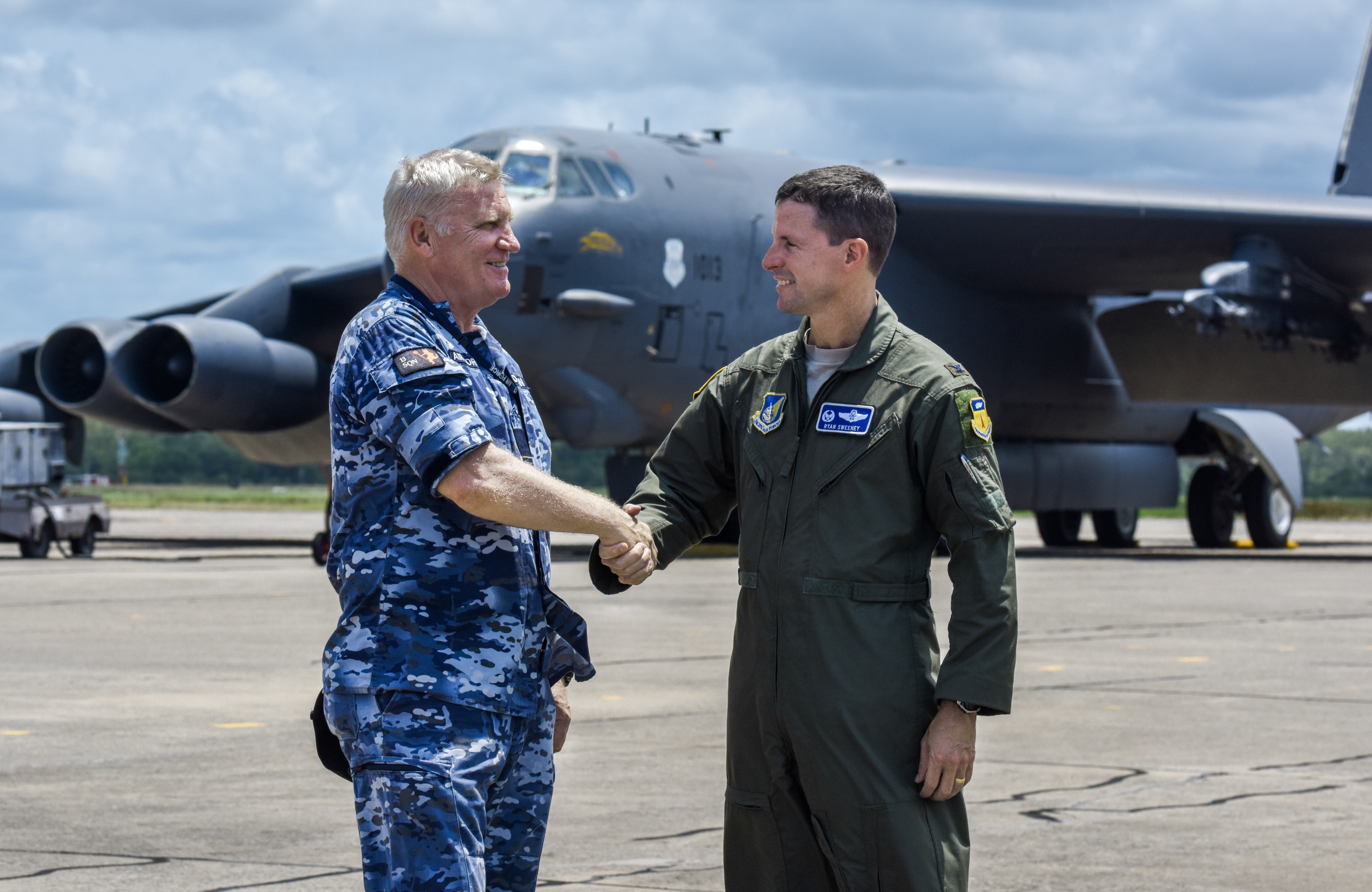
A member of the RAAF (at left) wearing the General Purpose Uniform

The General Purpose Uniform (GPU) is the working uniform of the Royal Australian Air Force. The GPU is to replace the Disruptive Pattern Camouflage Uniform (DPCU), also worn by the Australian Army, for general base duties and in non-warlike environments such as humanitarian tasks and Defence assistance to the civil community.

== History ==
The blue and grey uniform was officially launched in 2014 by then Chief of Air Force, Air Marshal Geoff Brown to give air force personnel a unique and easily identifiable appearance.

In June 2025, it was announced that the RAAF would transition to the Australian Multicam Camouflage Uniform by the end of the year as part of efforts to prepare the force for warfare in Australia's region. The GPU will continue to be authorised for wear on RAAF bases, but not on operations or exercises.

== Design ==
The GPU is a Crye Precision Australian Multicam pattern utilising blue and grey colours selected to reflect Air Force colours. The colours can be found in the Royal Australian Air Force's Service Dress uniform, the RAAF Ensign, and from airframes and airfields. The uniform whilst consisting of a disruptive pattern, is not intended to be used as camouflage in warlike operations or environments.

GPU is notable and controversial for its inclusion of relatively bright, high-visibility shades of blue. As such it cannot serve as tactical battledress, even though the pattern resembles the original Multicam camouflage from Crye Precision. Hence, RAAF commanders have been criticised and queried regarding GPU's lack of functional versatility, across musterings, and a key rationale for the new uniform – the claim that its introduction will be cost neutral.
