= Australian Multicam Camouflage Uniform =

Camouflage pattern of the Australian Defence Forces

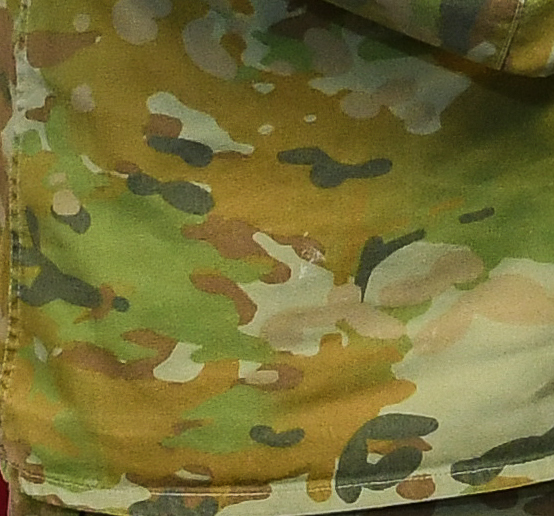
- Closeup of the AMCU pattern
- Type: Combat uniform
- Place of origin: Australia

Service history
- In service: 2014 - present
- Used by: Australian Defence Force

Production history
- Designer: Defence Science and Technology Organisation
- Designed: 2013
- Manufacturer: Australian Defence Apparel; Bruck Textiles

The Australian Multicam Camouflage Uniform (AMCU) is the combat uniform camouflage pattern for the Australian Defence Force, general issued from 2014 onwards. The AMCU replaced the Disruptive Pattern Camouflage Uniform (DPCU) and Australian Multicam Pattern - Operational Combat Uniform (AMP-OCU) camouflage patterns.

The AMCU has the base pattern of the MultiCam camouflage pattern with a colour palette based on the Disruptive Pattern Camouflage Uniform.

The AMCU became the official uniform of the Australian Army in late 2019, with DPCU discontinued and last issued in 2021.

== History ==
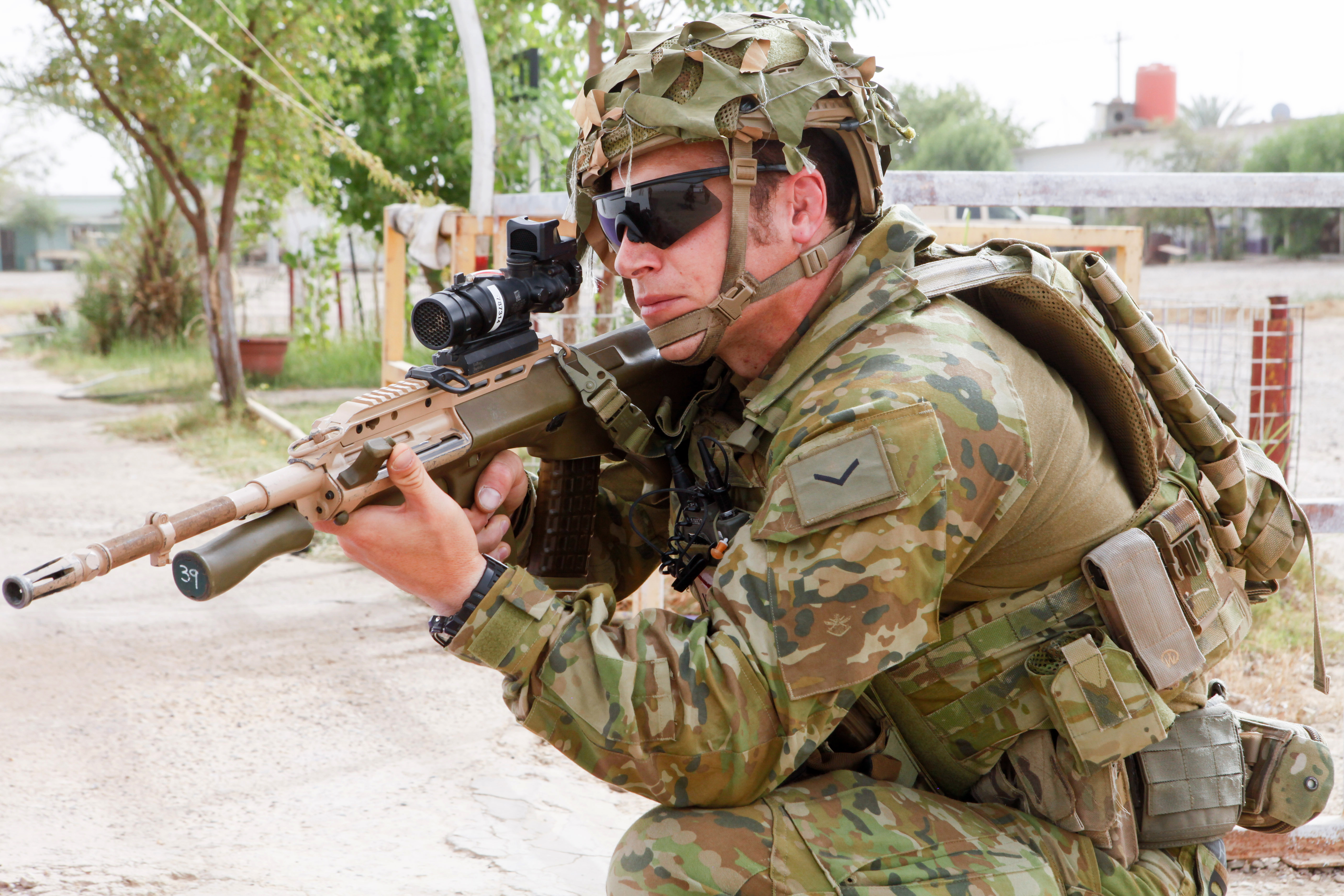
An Australian soldier wearing AMCU in Iraq, 2016

In December 2009, the Special Operations Task Group (SOTG) serving in Afghanistan as part of Operation Slipper, after trialling the Multicam pattern uniform worn by United States and British special forces, recommended adopting the Crye Precision Combat Uniform (CPCU) as their operational uniform. The SOTG trial found the uniform provided better concealment in urban, desert and alpine Afghan terrains over the current issue Disrupted Pattern Desert Uniform (DPDU) and was superior in terms of functionality and ergonomics.

In November 2010, the Minister for Defence Materiel announced that the CPCU would be issued to the Mentoring Task Force close-combatant elements to wear on patrols for a one-year trial. An urgent order for uniforms was placed with the United States manufacturer Crye Precision.

In 2001, the DPDU was designed by the Defence Science and Technology Organisation (DSTO) for the Afghan terrain. The initial DPDU pattern was a three-colour design which was urgently developed in six weeks and was produced with three days to spare. The DPDU was found to be too light and was improved by subsequent five-colour second and third iterations of the colour palette. In May 2010, the Chief of the Army announced that there would be trial of a new uniform: the Disruptive Pattern Mid-Point Uniform (DPMP).

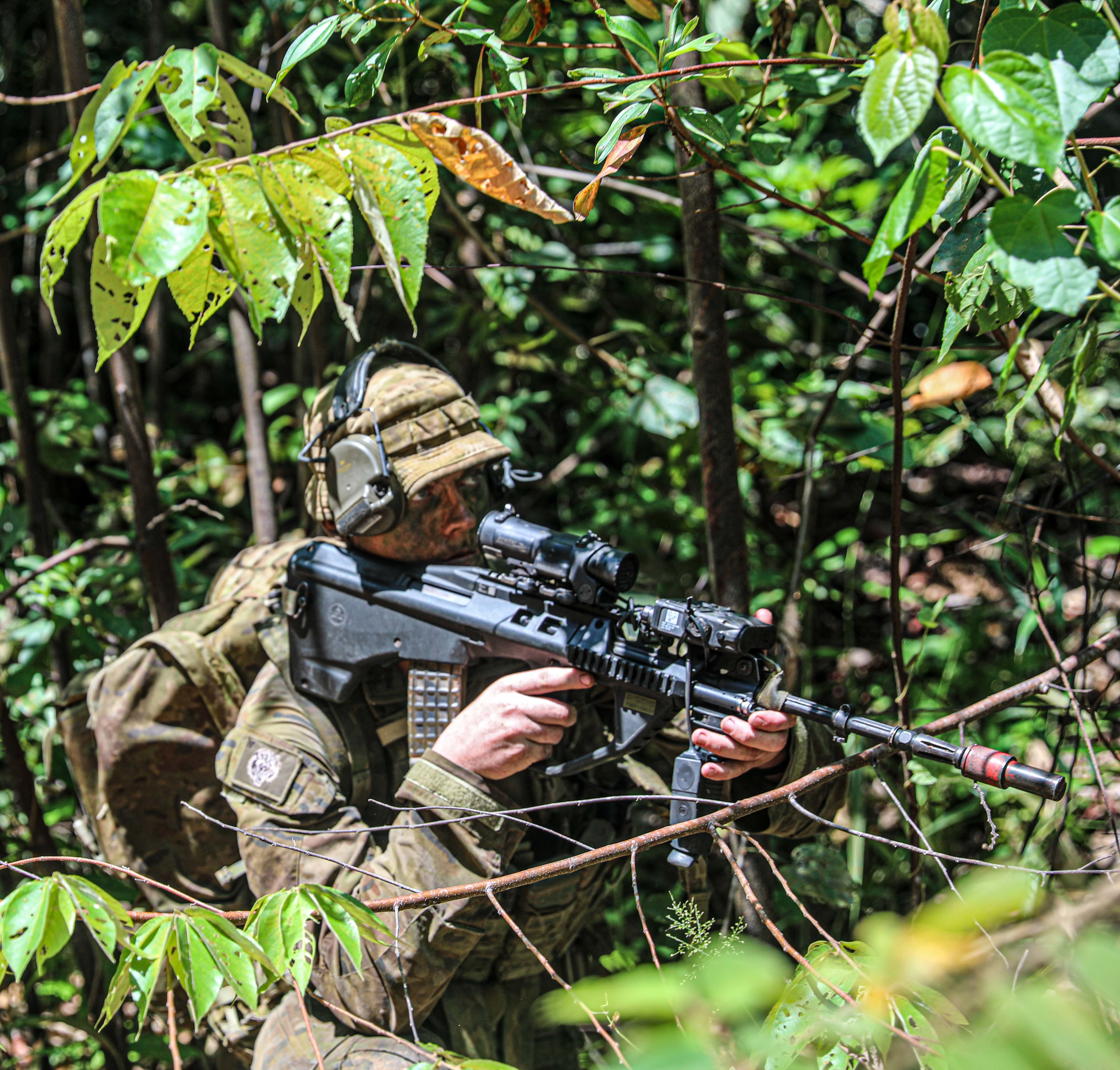
An Australian soldier in an Indonesian forest during the 2022 Super Garuda Shield military exercise

In May 2011, the Defence Materiel Organisation (DMO) purchased a licence from Crye Precision to be able to manufacture uniforms in Australia for US$4.7 million and also paid US$3.1 million for development of an Australian version of the camouflage pattern the Australian Multicam Pattern (AMP).

In 2012, an Australian produced uniform was issued the Australian Multicam Pattern - Operational Combat Uniform (AMP-OCU) based on Crye Precision's G3 uniform, made with a stronger fabric and unique Australian pattern which had been chosen from three test pattern designs. The uniform was produced by Pacific Brands WorkWear Group using camouflage fabric produced by Bruck Textiles.

In 2013, the AMCU designed by the DSTO for terrain types in Australia and the immediate region, was trialled in northern Australia in grasslands, jungle, desert and shrub lands terrains by Diggerworks (part of DMO) and performed as well as or better than the DPCU and the AMP-OCU. The AMCU colour palette uses six colours, five from the DPCU, and has an extra colour to enhance camouflage properties by day.

The AMCU is manufactured by Australian Defence Apparel (ADA) using camouflage fabric produced by Bruck Textiles and has two variants: a field uniform and a combat uniform. In October 2014, the AMCU had an initial release to the Army's 3rd Brigade, which resulted in a number of minor amendments to the design. In January 2016, the final design roll out began.

The introduction of the AMCU coincided with the introduction of the Soldier Combat Ensemble (SCE), which is being procured in AMCU, and consists of five elements: Ballistic Laser Ocular Protection (BLOPS), Tiered Combat Helmet (TCE), Combat Hearing Protection (CHP), Load Carriage Elements (LCE) and Protective Elements (PE).

== Similar camouflage patterns ==
Similar camouflage patterns to the AMCU include the British Army's Multi-Terrain Pattern, and the United States Army's Operational Camouflage Pattern.

== See also ==
- General Purpose Uniform
- Uniforms of the Australian Army
