= Musterings =

Royal Australian Air Force term

The term Mustering is used by the Royal Australian Air Force to describe the trades performed by airmen (enlisted/Non-Commissioned members).
