= Operational Camouflage Pattern =

United States military camouflage pattern

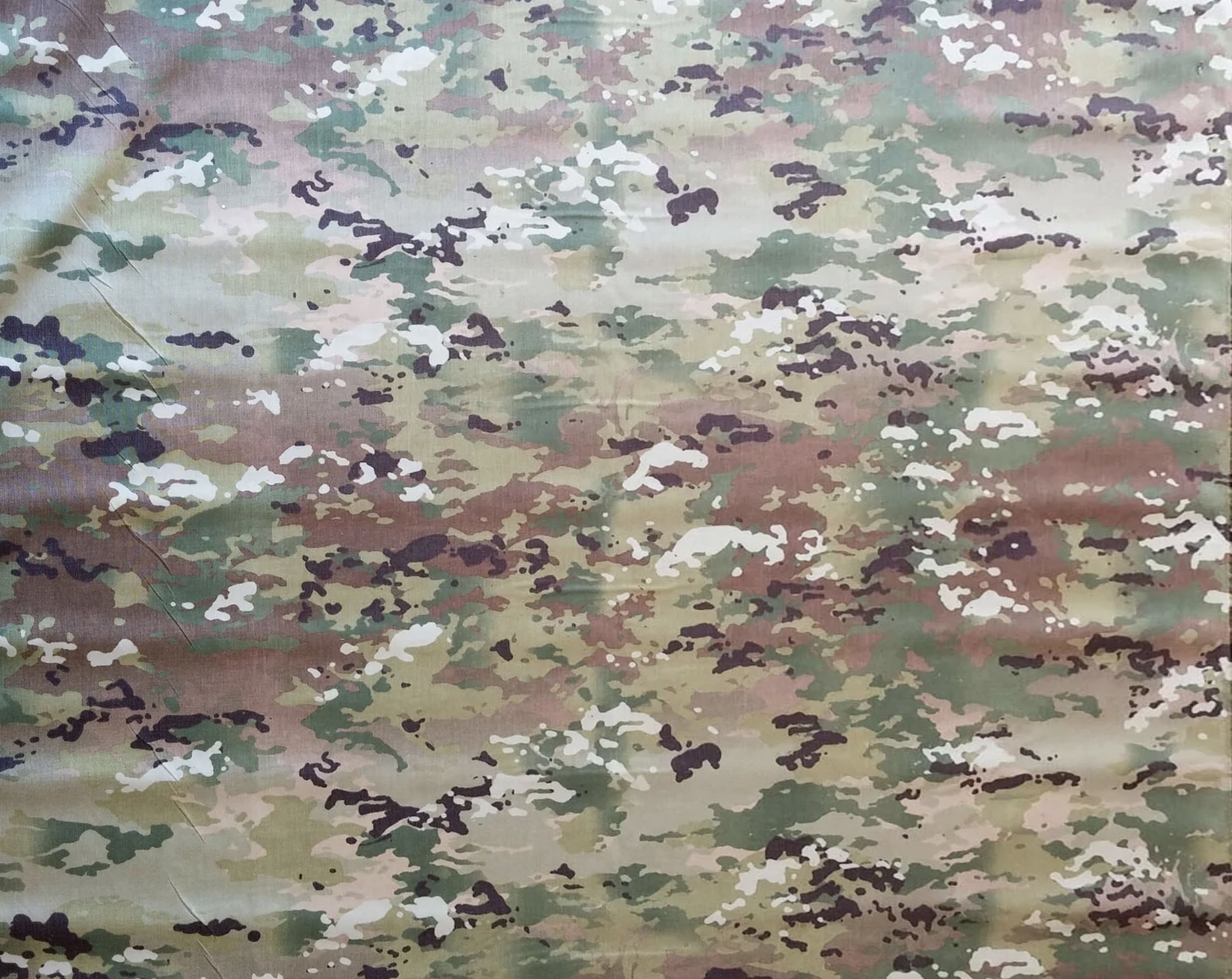
- A swatch of OCP
- Type: Military camouflage pattern
- Place of origin: United States

Service history
- In service: 2015–present
- Used by: United States Army; United States Air Force; United States Space Force; United States Navy (individual augmentees); United States Coast Guard (SMTC/DSF); See Users for non-US users
- Wars: War in Afghanistan; Iraq War; Syrian civil war Russian invasion of Ukraine

Production history
- Designer: Crye Precision and Natick Labs
- Designed: 2002 (Initial pattern); 2009 (Modified by Natick)
- Produced: 2015–present
- Variants: See Variants

Operational Camouflage Pattern (OCP), originally codenamed Scorpion W2, is a military camouflage pattern adopted in 2015 by the United States Army for use as the U.S. Army's main camouflage pattern on the Army Combat Uniform (ACU). This pattern officially replaced the U.S. Army's previous Universal Camouflage Pattern (UCP) as the official combat uniform pattern for most U.S. soldiers at the end of September 2019. The pattern also superseded the closely related MultiCam, a pattern previously used for troops deploying to Afghanistan.

The United States Air Force also replaced their former Airman Battle Uniform (ABU) with the ACU in OCP after positive feedback from airmen who wore the uniform while being deployed to Afghanistan with Army soldiers. In 2019, it also commenced use by United States Space Force personnel who had transferred from the Air Force to the Space Force.

The original "Scorpion" pattern was developed by a joint venture of the Army's Natick Labs and Crye Precision as part of the Objective Force Warrior (OFW) program more than a decade prior. Crye then modified it to create MultiCam for commercial sales. In July 2014, the Army announced that OCP could be used in the field by the summer of 2015.

In early April 2015, Army Chief of Staff Ray Odierno revealed that OCP uniforms were beginning to be issued to deployed soldiers going to Afghanistan, Iraq, Europe, and the Horn of Africa. The OCP ACU became available for soldiers to purchase starting July 1, 2015.

== Background ==
=== Selection process ===
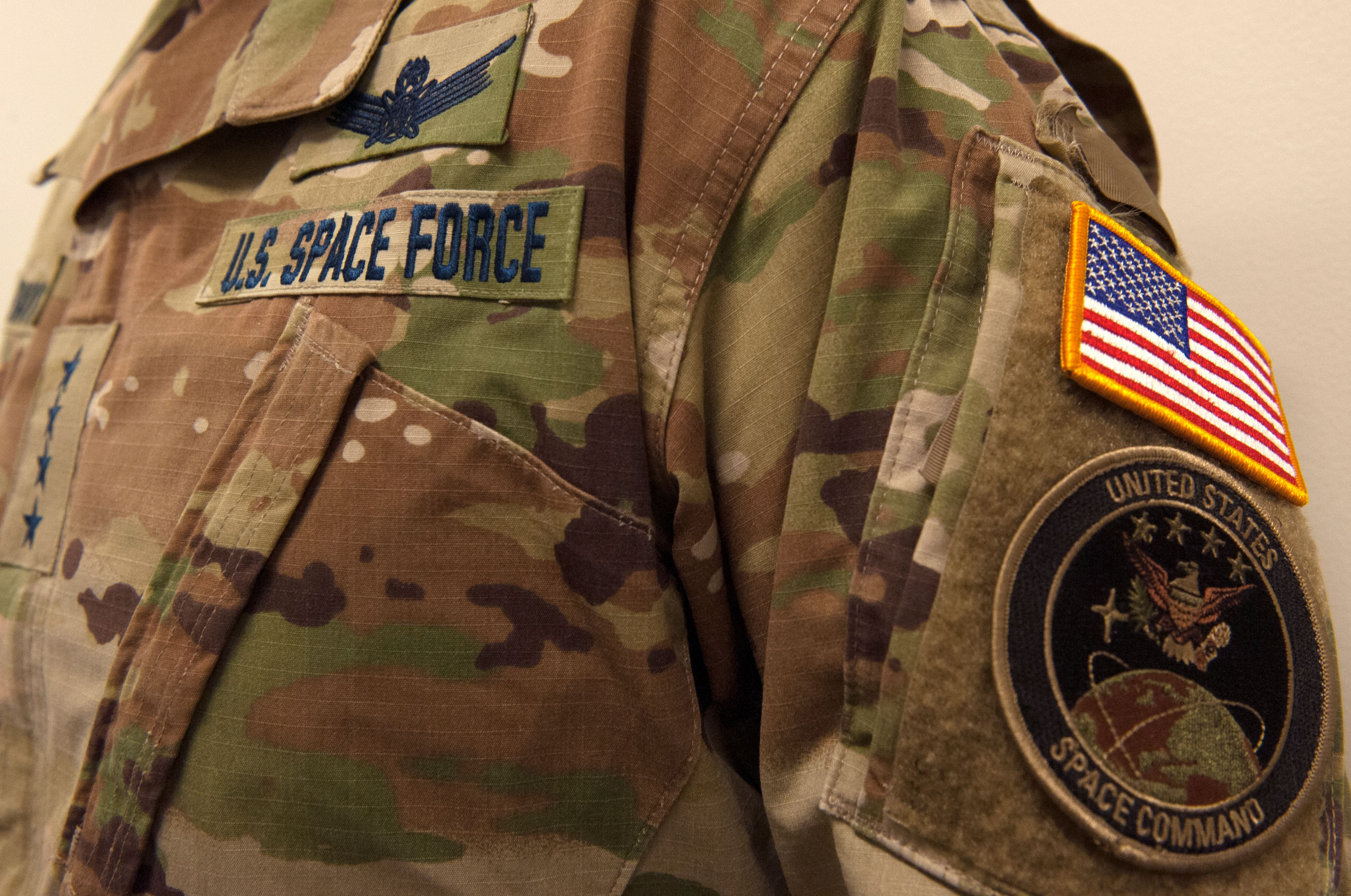
U.S. Space Force OCP uniform

In the early 2010s, the U.S. Army concluded that the UCP did not adequately meet all of the concealment needs for Afghanistan's multiple regions.

In 2010, the United States Army Camouflage Improvement Effort considered 22 entrants. The Army eliminated the patterns down to five finalists who exceeded the baseline patterns and Scorpion W2 was among them in the Army's in-house submission (the Army later withdrew their submission leaving the four commercial vendors). The finalists in the Army's Phase IV camouflage testing were Crye Precision; ADS Inc. and Hyperstealth Inc.; Brookwood Companies Inc.; and Kryptek Inc.

The 2014 National Defense Authorization Act (NDA or NDAA), prevents any service from adopting a new camouflage pattern not already in inventory before the NDA, unless they get all other services to adopt the same pattern. As a result, the Army had to consider existing camouflage patterns within the United States Department of Defense.

Initially, the Army's first pattern choice was the MultiCam pattern developed by Crye Precision, but allegedly due to "printing fees", procurement discussions broke down. Crye Precision developed the original Scorpion pattern under a government contract in 2002. The pattern was modified by the United States Army Natick Soldier Research, Development and Engineering Center in 2009 and named the Scorpion W2 pattern. The Army owns the licensing rights for Scorpion W2, which lowers the overall cost, and allows the Army the option to restrict the pattern to service members only.

=== Rollout ===
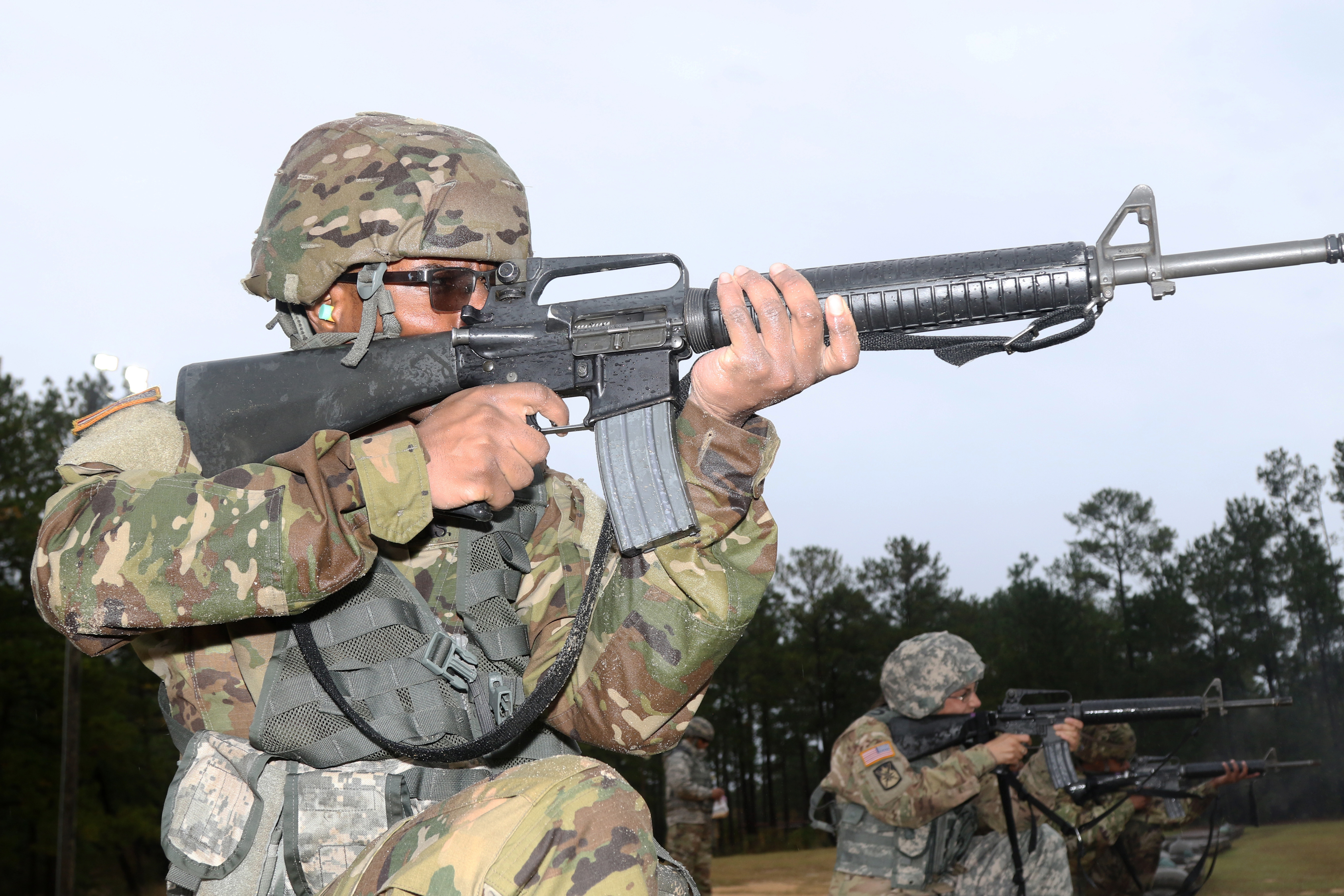
U.S. Army soldiers wearing OCP uniforms mixed with legacy UCP equipment while shooting M16A2s at a shooting range.

The ACU patterned in OCP first became available to U.S. Army soldiers on July 1, 2015, at 20 locations in the contiguous United States and in South Korea, with first-day sales exceeding $1.4 million. More installations began sales later in 2015, although soldiers deploying on real-world missions began receiving uniforms and equipment printed in OCP before that date. The color of the T-shirt and belt worn with the OCP ACU are Tan 499, as opposed to the desert sand color for the previous uniform, although soldiers were allowed to continue to wear the older color T-shirts, belts, and boots until October 2019. Body armor, packs, and pouches in previous UCP and MultiCam patterns will be worn until they can be replaced with OCP.

On May 14, 2018, the U.S. Air Force announced that all airmen will transition from the Airman Battle Uniform to the OCP uniform. Airmen were authorized to wear OCP uniforms beginning October 1, 2018. Recruits in basic training, and cadets in Air Force Reserve Officer Training Corps, and Officer Training School were issued OCPs beginning October 1, 2019. All airmen were required to own OCP uniforms by April 1, 2021. Unlike the Army, the Air Force uses brown thread for name tapes and rank insignia and have a subdued-color flag patch at all times instead of when on deployment.

The U.S. Space Force has also adopted the OCP uniform, but with navy blue thread for ranks and tapes.

The Civil Air Patrol adopted the OCP uniform on November 4, 2025, replacing the Airman Battle Uniform. ABUs are still authorized as a uniform until October 31, 2028. The Civil Air Patrol's version of OCPs has navy blue name tapes and with silver lettering and full-color patches.

== Users ==
- United States: Current standard camouflage of the U.S. Army since 2015 and U.S. Air Force since 2018.
  - United States Army
  - United States Air Force
    - Civil Air Patrol, USAF Auxiliary
  - United States Space Force: SMTC/DSF
  - United States Navy (individual augmentees)
  - State Defense Forces: Using modified OCP uniforms.

== See also ==
- MARPAT, a digital camouflage used by the United States Marine Corps
- Australian Multicam Camouflage Uniform, a similar camouflage pattern issued to the Australian Defence Force from 2014 onwards
- Multi-Terrain Pattern, a similar camouflage pattern issued to the British Army from 2010 onwards
