= Narifuri =

narifuri is a Japanese fashion brand based in Tokyo. Its main concept is "fashion + bicycle," and the product lineup includes a variety of clothes from casual wear and cycling jerseys to formal suits, as well as accessories such as bags, wallets, and belts.

The name narifuri is taken directly from the Japanese term narifuri (Kanji: "形振り"), an expression related to showing how one dresses and/or behaves. In keeping with the bicycle motif in the brand's design, narifuri's logo is a black knock-out of a bicycle pedal.

== Summary ==
narifuri (stylized with a lowercase "n") was founded by Kazumasa Kobayashi in 2007 with the concept of "fashion + bicycle" in mind. Its clothing is designed to be comfortable to wear while cycling, although the biking-compatible functionality of the products has not been excessively promoted so as to attract non-cycling consumers. This dual appeal is reflected by the fact that nearly half of narifuri's suit buyers are not bike riders. narifuri's products include casual wear, cycling jerseys, and formal suits as well as accessories like bags, wallets, and belts. Some of the brand's main items are jackets, pants, and bags.

narifuri's products are sold in bike shops, fashion stores, and department stores. Sometimes exhibitions are open for the public as event-style shows. One example is the invitation of interior stylist Mitsuko Kuroda for an exhibition at Daikanyama T-Site (Tokyo). narifuri regularly collaborates with brands in a variety of other industries.

=== Establishment and ownership history ===
Founder Kazumasa Kobayashi ran narifuri Inc. as CEO from its establishment in 2007 until Hit Union Inc. acquired all of the stock on August 1, 2016, making narifuri a wholly owned subsidiary. Kazumasa left the company at the end of July 2016 and Keiji Tanabe took over the position as the new CEO of narifuri.

== Attributes ==
=== Attributes as a brand ===
narifuri rarely makes big changes to its standard design, instead introducing their regular assortments in each category by updating the functions and design every season. Some of its products have remained almost the same since the brand was established.

The fabric used in many of the products was originally developed to add bicycle-related functionality such as quick-drying, stretch, breathability, and durability to the designs.

=== Attributes in products ===
Aside from bike-friendly clothing, bags are one of narifuri's main products. Many of its bag designs include buckles that have the same pedal shape as the brand's icon.

== Direct Management Stores ==
- narifuri EBISU - 2011, Flagship store, Ebisu, Tokyo in 2011.
- charifuri - 2012, Bikeshop, Ebisu, Tokyo.
- narifuri NYC - 2015, retail store, New York, USA.
- narifuri tokyo - 2017, Flagship store and charifuri (bicycle shop) moves to Sendagaya, Tokyo.
- narifuri kyoto - 2018, retail store, Shijō Kawaramachi, Kyoto.

=== Limited retail stores ("pop-up stores") ===
Pop-up stores, or limited retail stores, are often set up at department stores, bike shops, boutiques, and airports.

== Collaboration with other brands ==
One of narifuri's specialities is regular collaborations with other brands in various industries to produce products. narifuri's collaborations have included:

- Bridgestone Cycle (narifuri x Bridgestone Cycle)
  - HELMZ series (2007〜)
- Fred Perry
  - Polo shirt, Jacket (2009, 2010, 2011, 2012, 2013, 2014, 2015, 2016）
- Disney
  - T-shirt, cycle jersey (2013, 2014)
- Star Wars
  - T-shirt, cycle jersey, bags (2014, 2015)
  - Bicycle (2015 HELMZ STAR WARS COLLECTION)
- PEANUTS
  - Cycle jersey (2016)
- DESCENTE Mizusawa down
  - Down jacket (2014, 2015, 2016)
- LAVENHAM
  - Quilting vest (2014, 2016)
  - Coat（2015)
- New Era Cap Company
  - キャップ（2013)
- SPIEWAK
  - Jacket (2015）
  - Vest (2016)
- HUNTING WORLD
  - Bag (2016)

== See also ==
- HELMZ
- Japanese fashion
