= Spiewak =

Spiewak or Śpiewak ([ˈɕpjɛvak]) is a Polish-language surname, which literally means "singer". It is found across Poland, particularly in central and southern regions. It is related to the Ukrainian surname Spivak. Spiewak may refer to:

- Kacper Śpiewak (born 2000), Polish footballer
- Paweł Śpiewak (1951–2023), Polish sociologist and politician
- Wiesław Śpiewak (born 1963), Polish-born Roman Catholic prelate in Bermuda
- Włodzimierz Śpiewak (1938–1997), Polish footballer
- Jason Spiewak, a founder of Rock Ridge Music
- A short common name for I. Spiewak & Sons
- A brand name for police uniforms by I. Spiewak & Sons
