= Sal Pace (jazz musician) =

Sal Pace

Salvatore Frank Pace (August 10, 1906 – May 13, 1982) was an American jazz clarinetist and saxophonist.

== Life and career ==
Sal Pace was born on August 10, 1906 in White Plains, New York. He began studying the clarinet in 1918. From 1924 to 1928 he was a member of the Crescent City Five dixieland band in New York City. In the 1930s and 1940s he was active in bands led by Louis Armstrong, Joe Haymes (1936), Al Donahue (1940), Bunny Berigan (1941), and Charlie Spivak (1942-1945).

In the early 1940s Pace operated the Music Box nightclub in Valhalla, New York. When dixieland went through a resurgence in the late 1940s and early 1950s, Pace was part of that movement. People he played dixieland with included Billy Butterfield, Yank Lawson, Phil Napoleon (1949), and Jimmy McPartland (1951–1953). He recorded three records with Pee Wee Erwin in 1953, 1955, and 1956; recordings which were later released on the album Complete Fifties Recordings (Lone Hill Jazz records). He also recorded with Billy Maxted in 1955-1956, and performed frequently at Nick's with Maxted in the mid to late 1950s. He also played in Maxted's band for a four month residence at the Napoleon Club in Boston in 1959.

Pace died at NewYork-Presbyterian Queens (then Booth Memorial Hospital) on May 13, 1982 at the age of 75. He had two sons, Gary and James, with his wife Ann.
