= Uniforms of the United States Space Force =

Standardized military uniforms worn by members of the U.S. Space Force

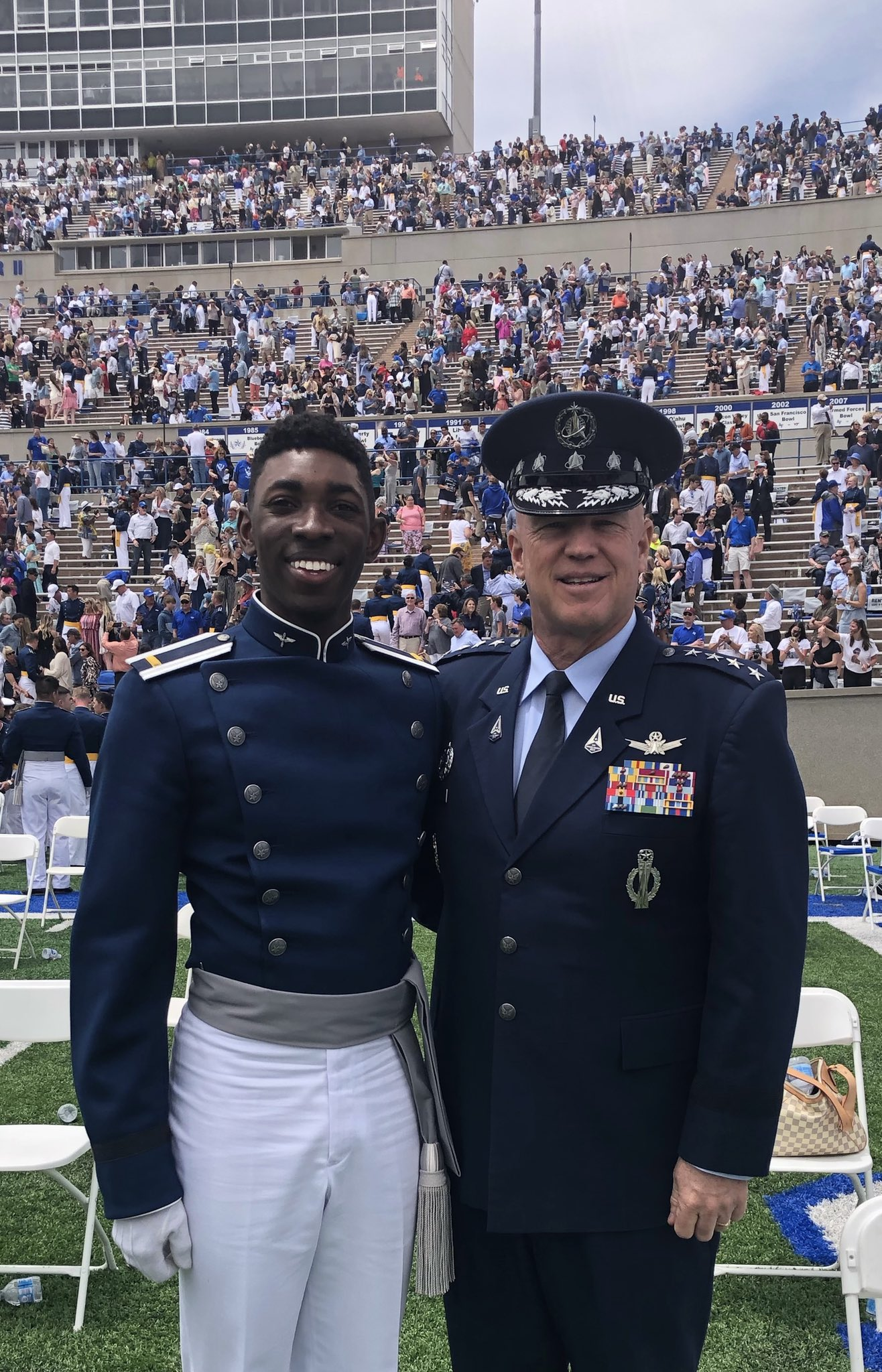
First Chief of Space Operations General John W. Raymond wearing the Space Force's interim service dress uniform with distinctive space force emblems on the service cap and standing next to a new second lieutenant wearing the parade dress uniform with a platinum sash worn by Air Force Academy graduates that are commissioning into the Space Force.

The uniforms of the United States Space Force are the standardized military uniforms worn by U.S. Space Force personnel, known as guardians.

== History ==
Following its institution as an independent service on 20 December 2019, the United States Space Force initially utilised Air Force uniforms adorned with specific Space Force insignia. However, two of its first unique uniforms went through a testing period, with the service uniform planned to be released in 2025. The new uniforms were introduced on January 13, 2026.

== Service dress uniform ==
The Space Force's interim service dress uniform was inherited from the U.S. Air Force, which was adopted by Air Force chief of staff General Ronald Fogleman in 1994, replacing earlier blue service dress uniforms, and will continue to be used until the conclusion of the uniform tests. The Space Force service dress uniform is distinguished from Air Force service dress by a distinctive U.S. Space Force lapel insignia.

The uniform coat is single-breasted with three buttons and has one welt pocket on the upper left side and two lower pocket flaps. The buttons are silver colored, featuring traditional "Hap Arnold wings". Officer coats feature epaulets for the placement of rank. General officers wear a 1 1/2-inch-wide (3.8 cm) blue sleeve braid, while all other officers wear a 1/2-inch-wide (1.3 cm) blue sleeve braid. Like the Air Force, mirror-silver "U.S." insignia are worn on the collars, however Space Force guardians also wear a pair of U.S. Space Force lapel insignia. A silver name tag with blue detailing is worn on the right side of the uniform, while ribbons and occupational badges are worn on the left side of the uniform.

On 21 September 2021, General John W. Raymond, the first Chief of Space Operations, unveiled the prototypes of the Space Force's service uniform. It features a midnight blue jacket with six buttons on the right-hand side, platinum sleeve braids for commissioned officers, a midnight blue necktie that matches the jacket, platinum shirt, mirror-silver "U.S." insignia on the collars, dark grey pants, and black shoes. The new uniform is designed with women in mind to avoid the issues normally related to adapting them for women. The new uniforms will be issued for testing in the following months, before being distributed widely.

On 3 May 2022, General Raymond publicly wore the latest prototype of the service's dress uniform as he testified before a Senate Armed Services Committee hearing to review the Air Force's Defense Authorization Request for fiscal year 2023. Noteworthy changes from the prototype unveiled in September 2021 included: the addition of stripes down the tailored pants, the change of the pocket style, the addition of pockets on the lower half of the jacket, and the decrease of the number of buttons on the interior enclosure of the jacket.

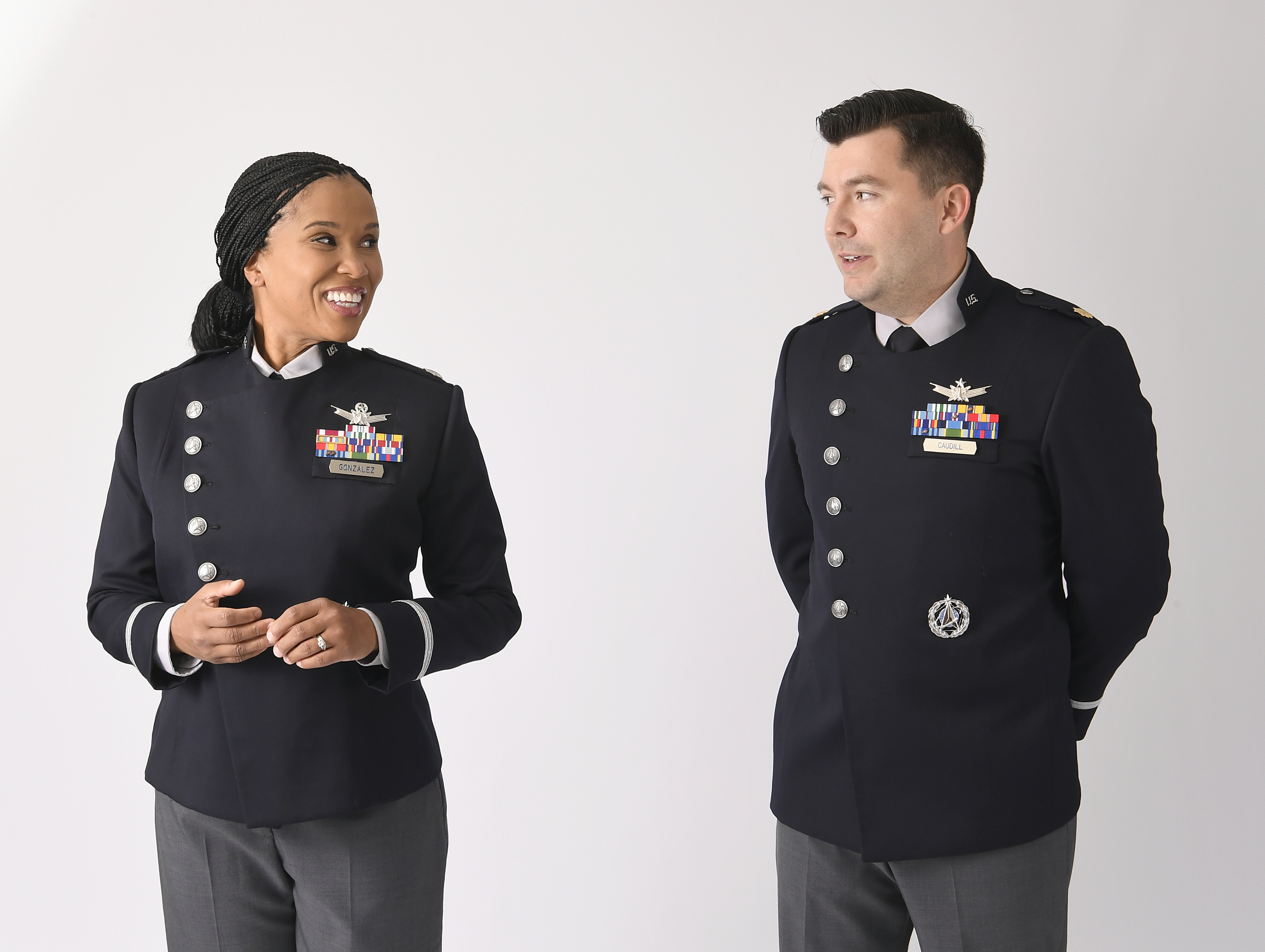
The prototype of the Space Force's proposed service dress uniform being modeled in September 2021.

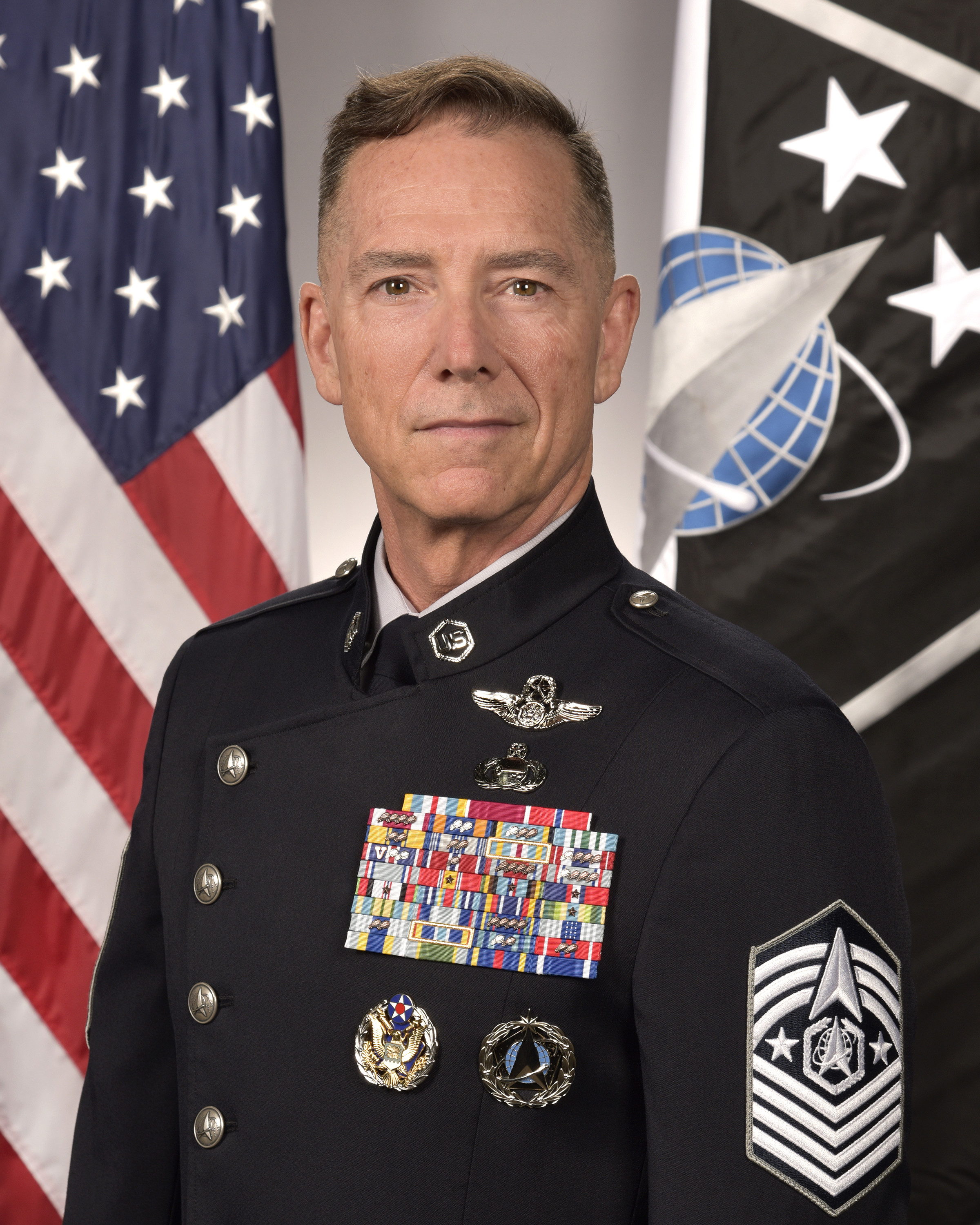
CMSSF Roger A. Towberman wearing the service dress uniform in June 2022.

== Combat utility uniform ==
On 17 January 2020, the Space Force announced that its combat utility uniform would be the same Operational Camouflage Pattern (OCP) uniform as when it was Air Force Space Command. The full-color United States flag is worn on the left side of the uniform. The name tape, branch tape, and rank are embroidered in space blue, distinguishing it from the OCP uniforms worn by the Army and Air Force (the Army uses black thread for embroidery and wears the full-color flag on the right arm, except in combat areas where a subdued black flag is used). The Air Force uses spice brown embroidery thread and wears a subdued spice brown flag on the right arm of the uniform at all times.) The OCP uniform was first introduced by the Army in 2015 and adopted by the Air Force in 2019.

The Space Force also authorized the Airman Battle Uniform as a combat utility uniform, which was introduced by the Air Force in 2007 and was phased out in April 2021.

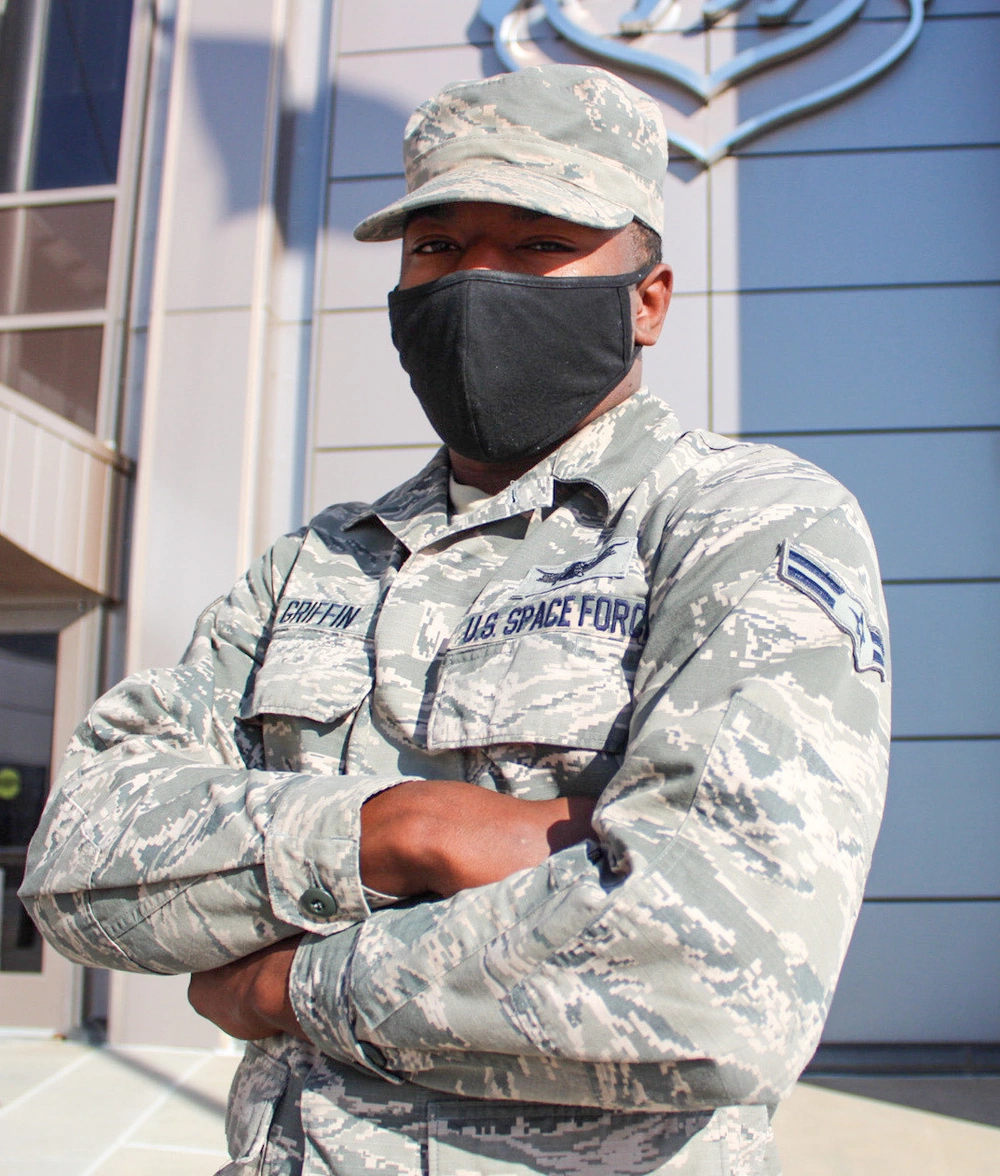
A United States Space Force member wearing the Airman Battle Uniform with appropriate Space Force accoutrements; Wear of the ABU by both the USAF and USSF ceased in 2021 in favor of the OCP uniform.

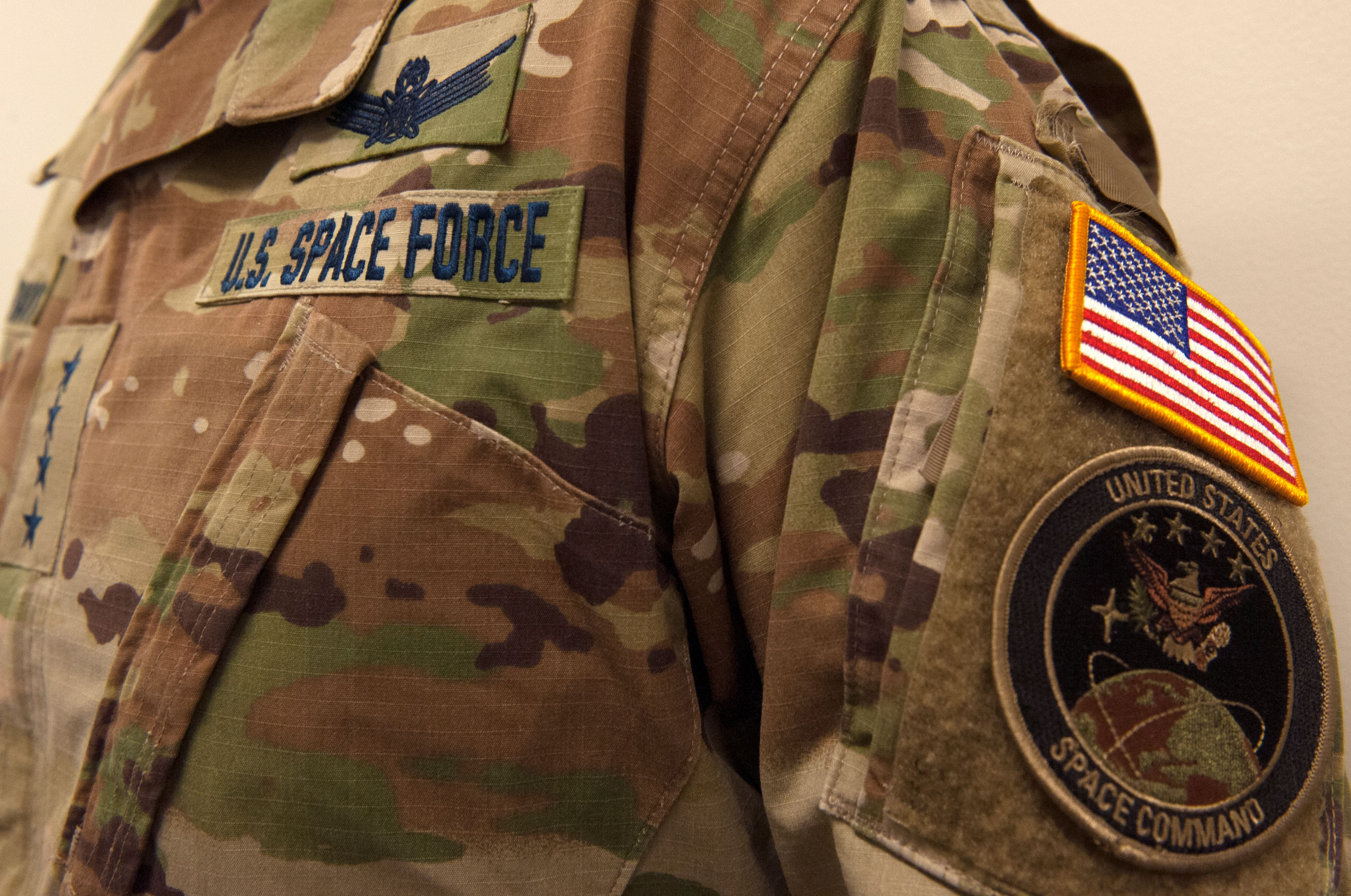
General John W. Raymond, the first chief of space operations, models the service's OCP uniform.

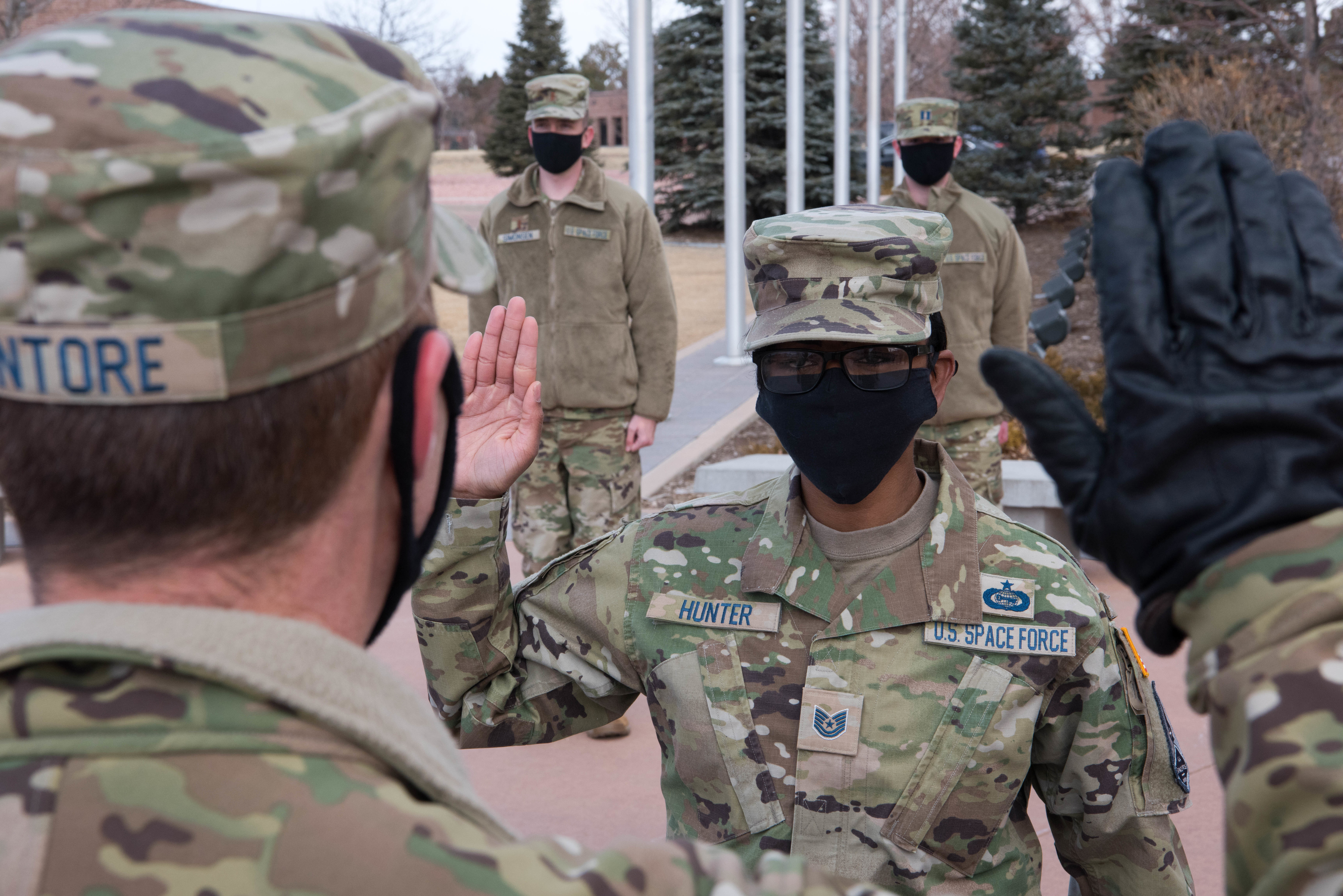
The OCP uniform with a patrol cap and air force rank insignia.

== Physical training gear ==
The Space Force's first unique PT uniform was released in March 2024.

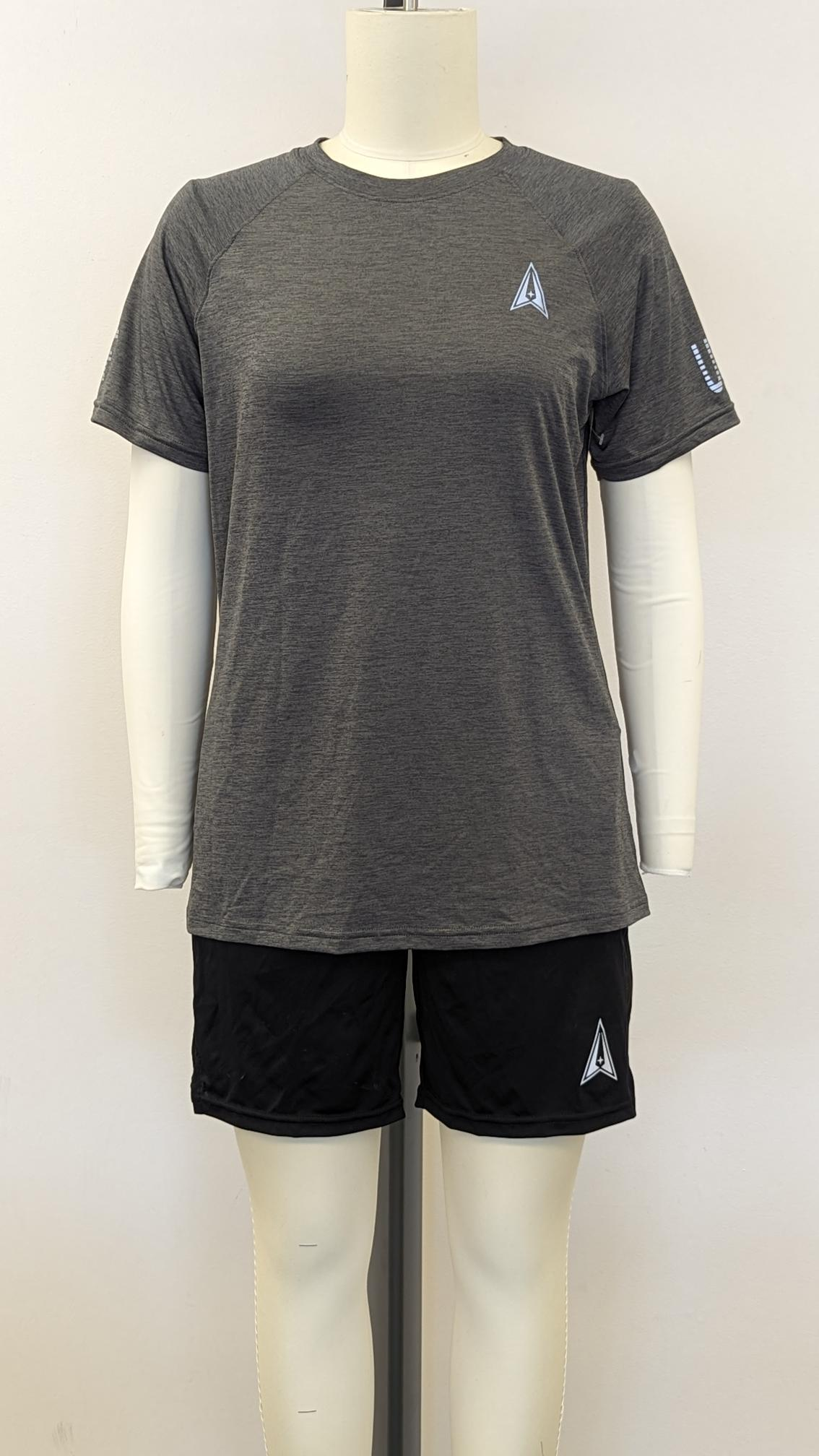
The first prototype of the Space Force Physical Training Gear (SFPTG) in warm weather configuration

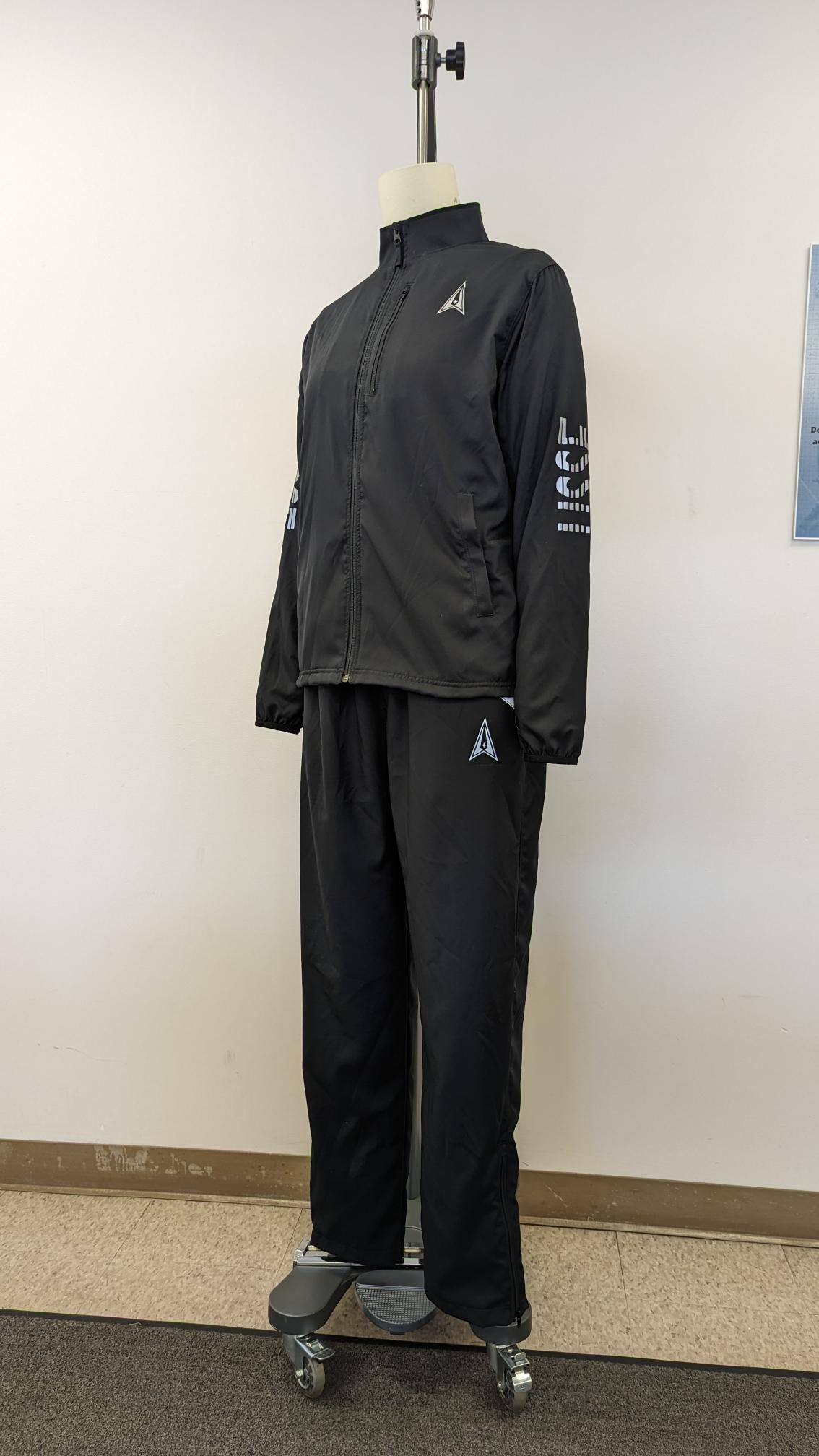
The first prototype of the SFPTG in cold weather configuration

== Cadet uniform ==
Space Force cadets at the United States Air Force Academy wear the standard parade dress uniform with a platinum sash for graduation. Air Force cadets wear the same uniform, but with a gold sash.

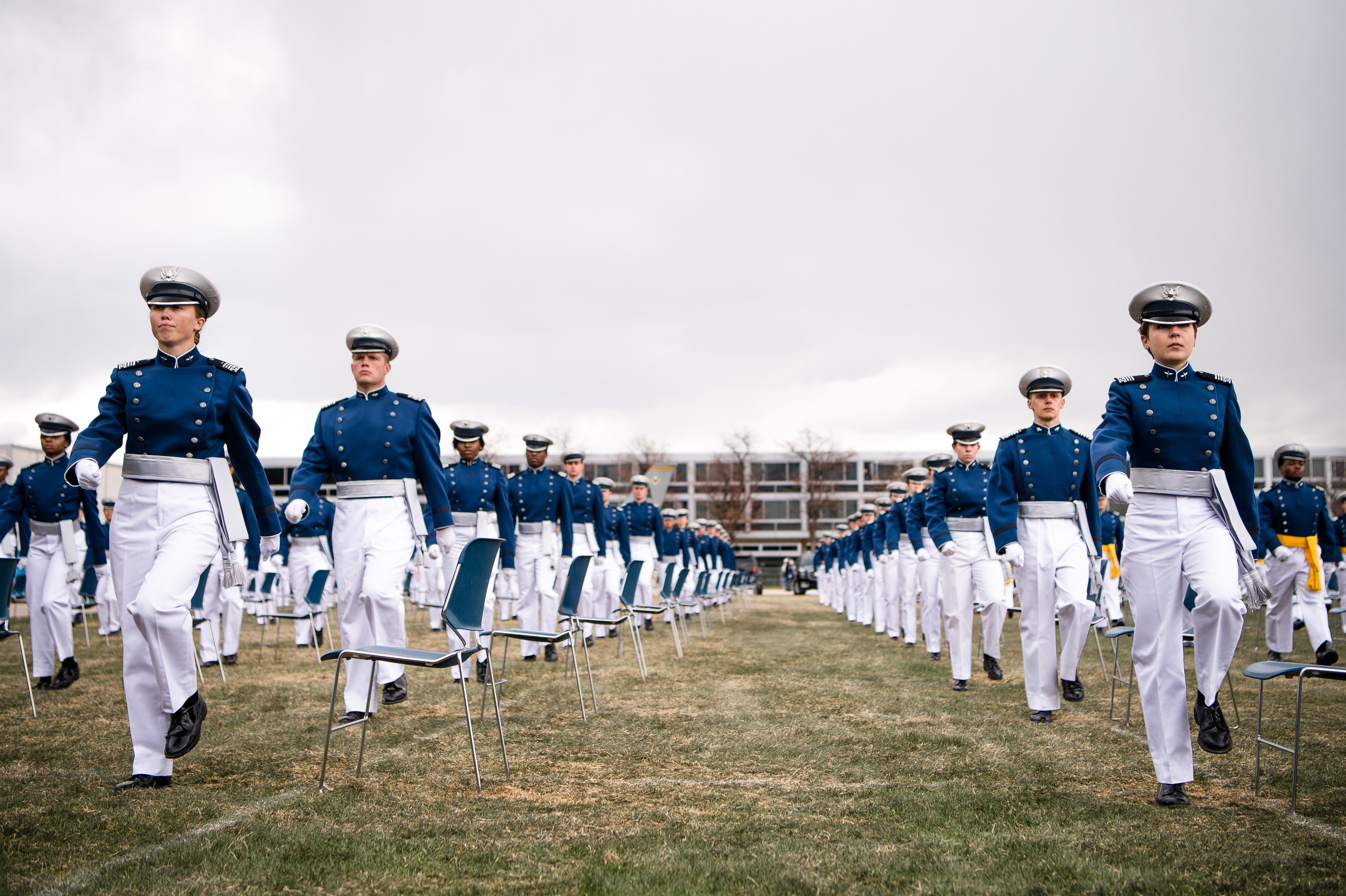
The first Space Force cadets, showcasing their distinctive parade dress at the Air Force Academy's graduation for the class of 2020.

== See also ==
- Uniforms of the United States Armed Forces
