= Uniforms of the United States Armed Forces =

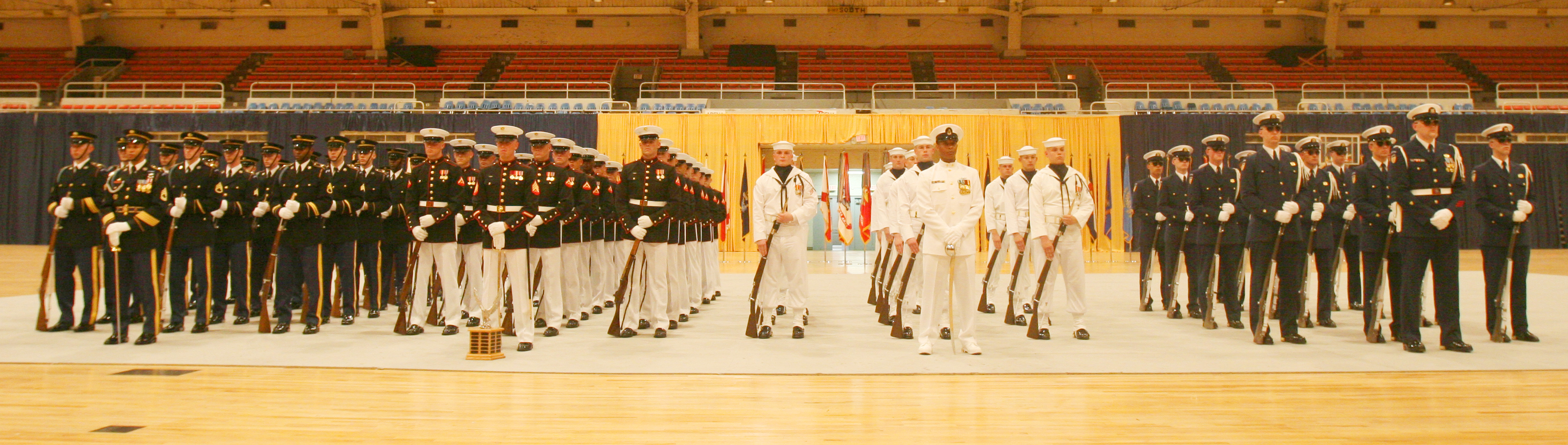
A U.S. Armed Forces Joint Ceremony at the D.C. National Guard Armory in April 2008

Each branch of the United States Armed Forces has its own uniforms and regulations regarding them.

- Uniforms of the U.S. Army
- Uniforms of the U.S. Marine Corps
- Uniforms of the U.S. Navy
- Uniforms of the U.S. Air Force
- Uniforms of the U.S. Space Force
- Uniforms of the U.S. Coast Guard

== Combat uniforms overview ==
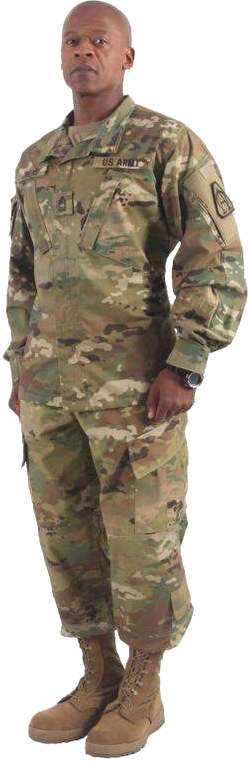
Army/Air Force/Space Force – ACU
Known as the OCP uniform in the Air Force and Space Force

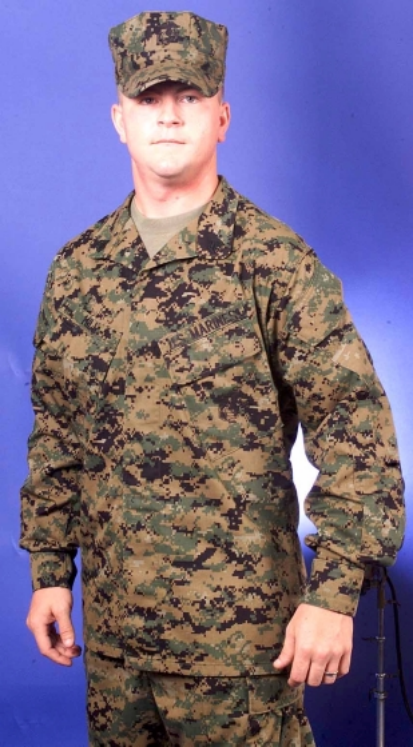
Marine Corps – MCCUU
(woodland and desert variants)

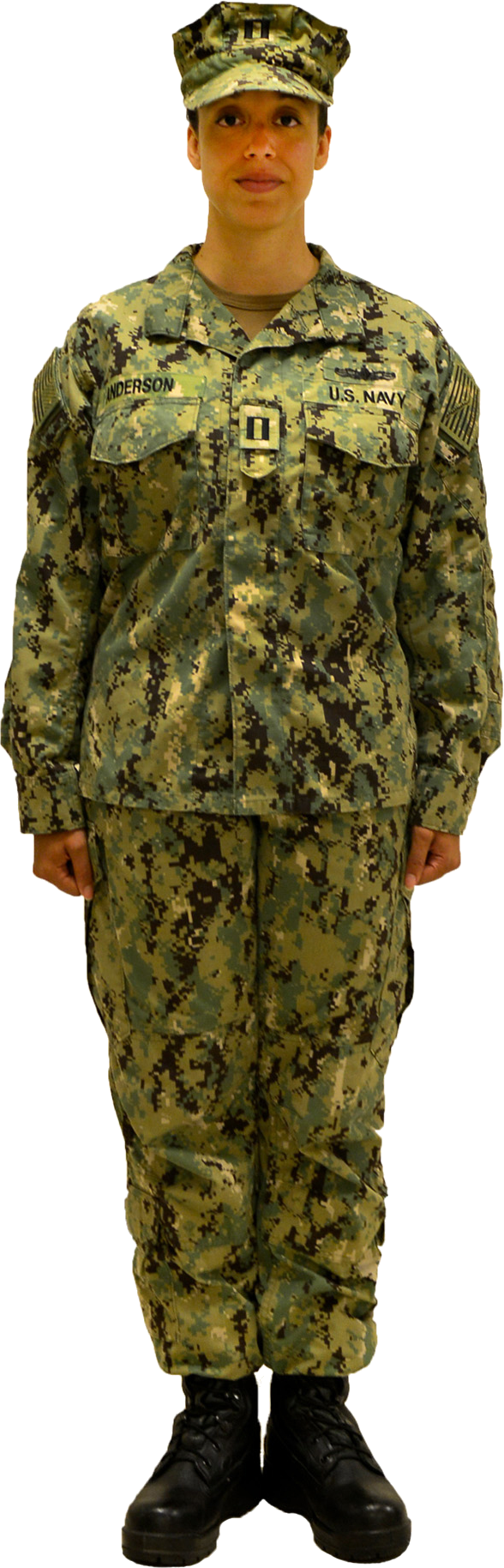
Navy – NWU
Currently, two patterns are in use: AOR-1, which is primarily tan, and AOR-2 (shown above), which is primarily green.

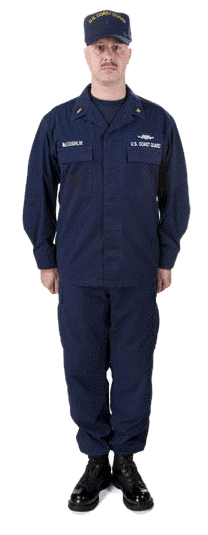
Coast Guard – ODU
Coast Guard members assigned to deployed or deployable units and those cross-assigned to Navy commands wear the NWU.

== United States Military dress uniforms overview ==
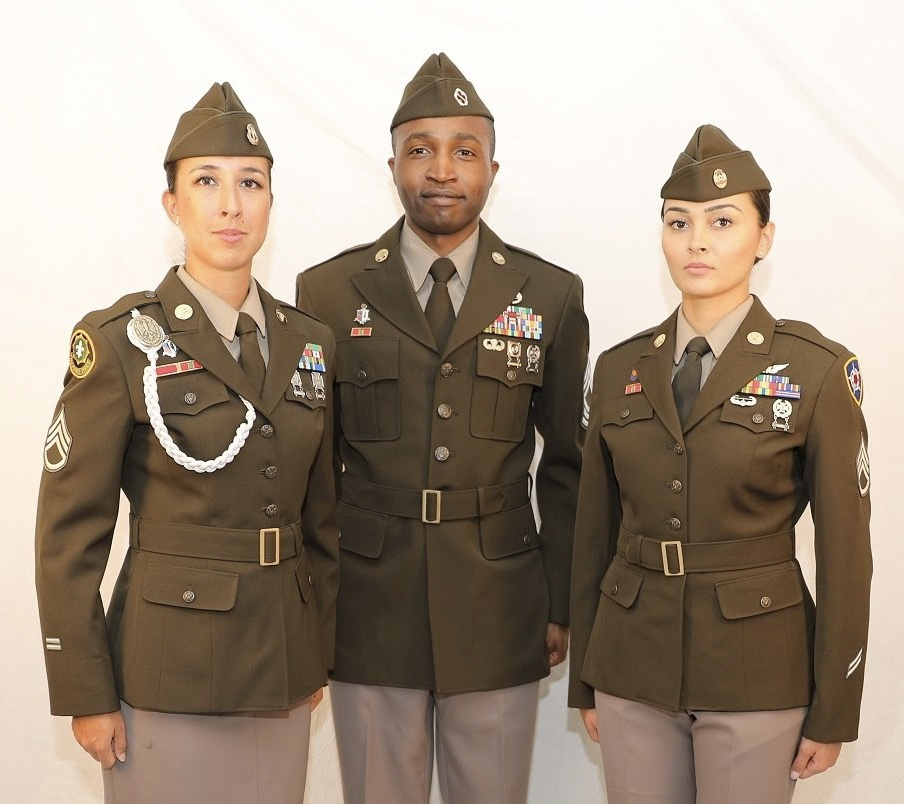
Army – AGSU

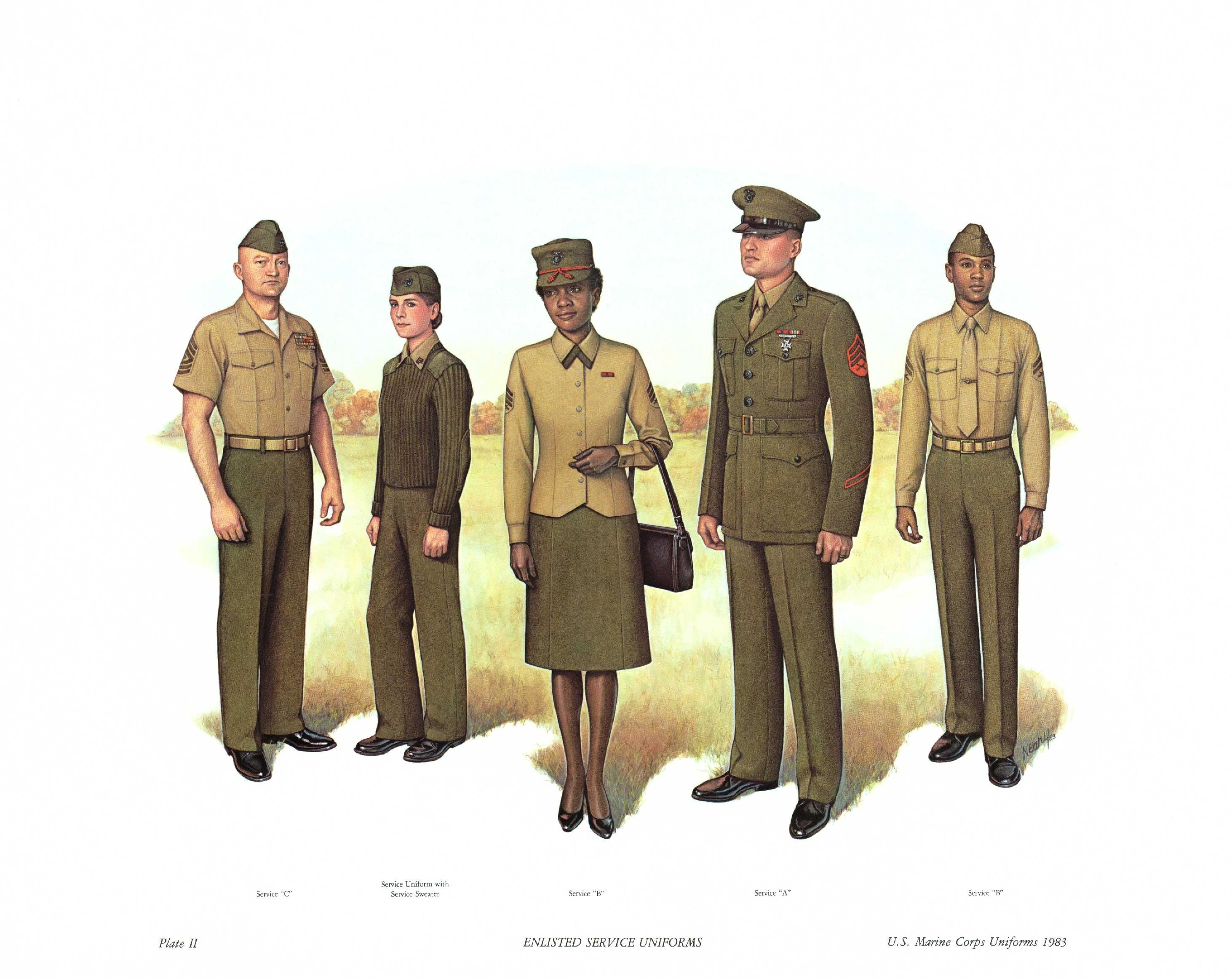
Marine Corps – Service Dress

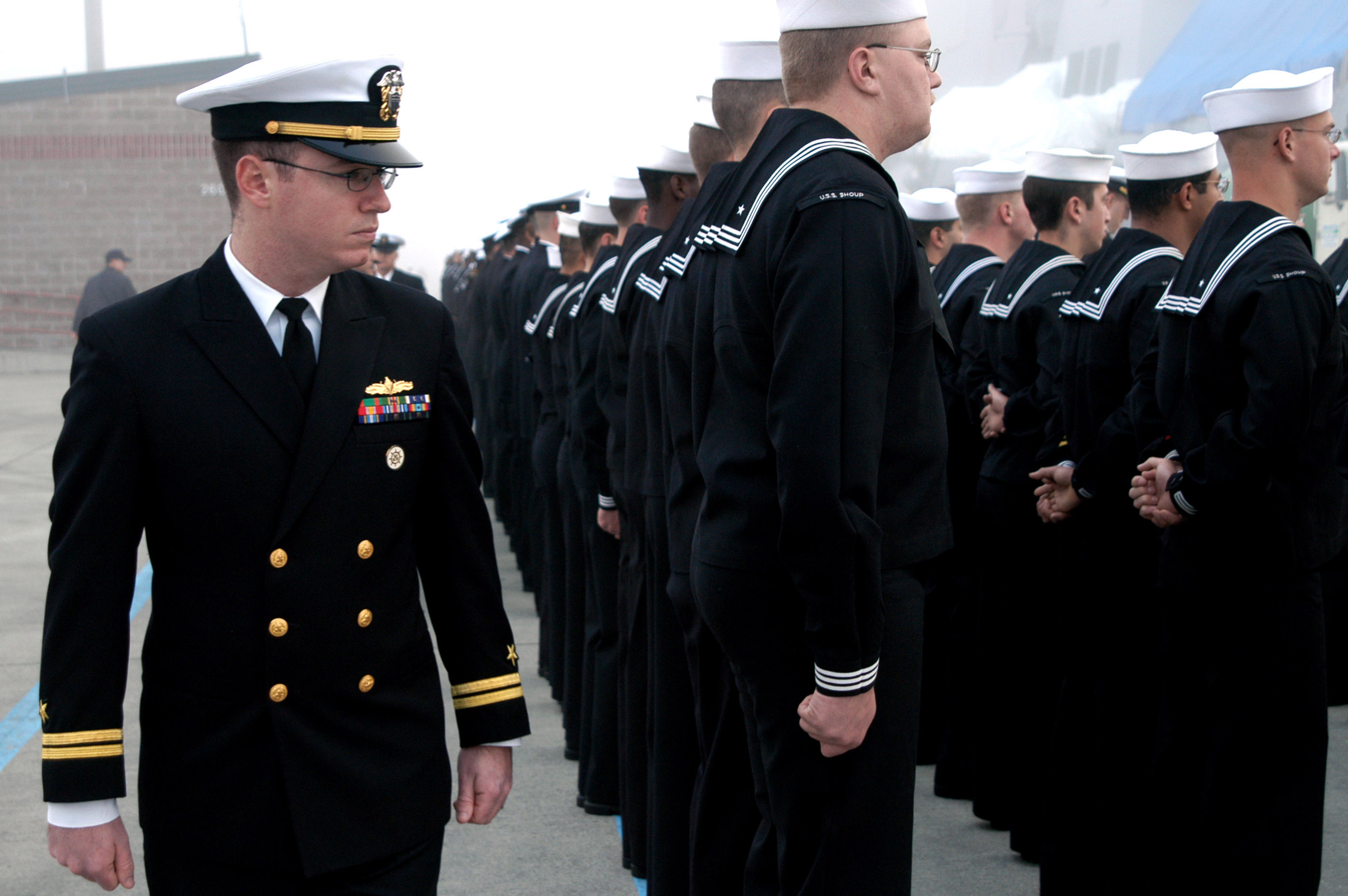
Navy -–U.S. Navy Dress Blues

Air Force – AFSDU

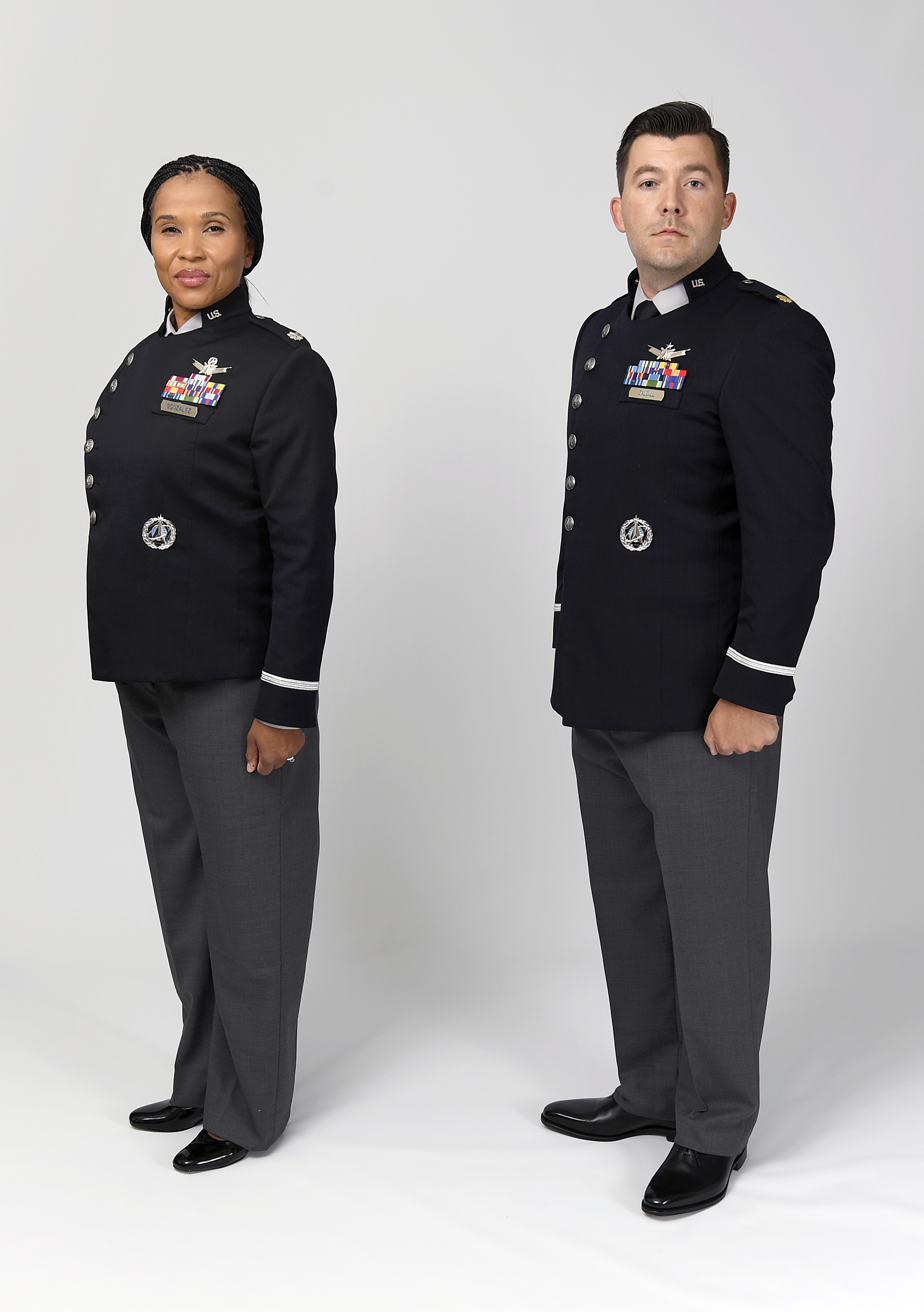
Space Force – SFSDU (prototype)

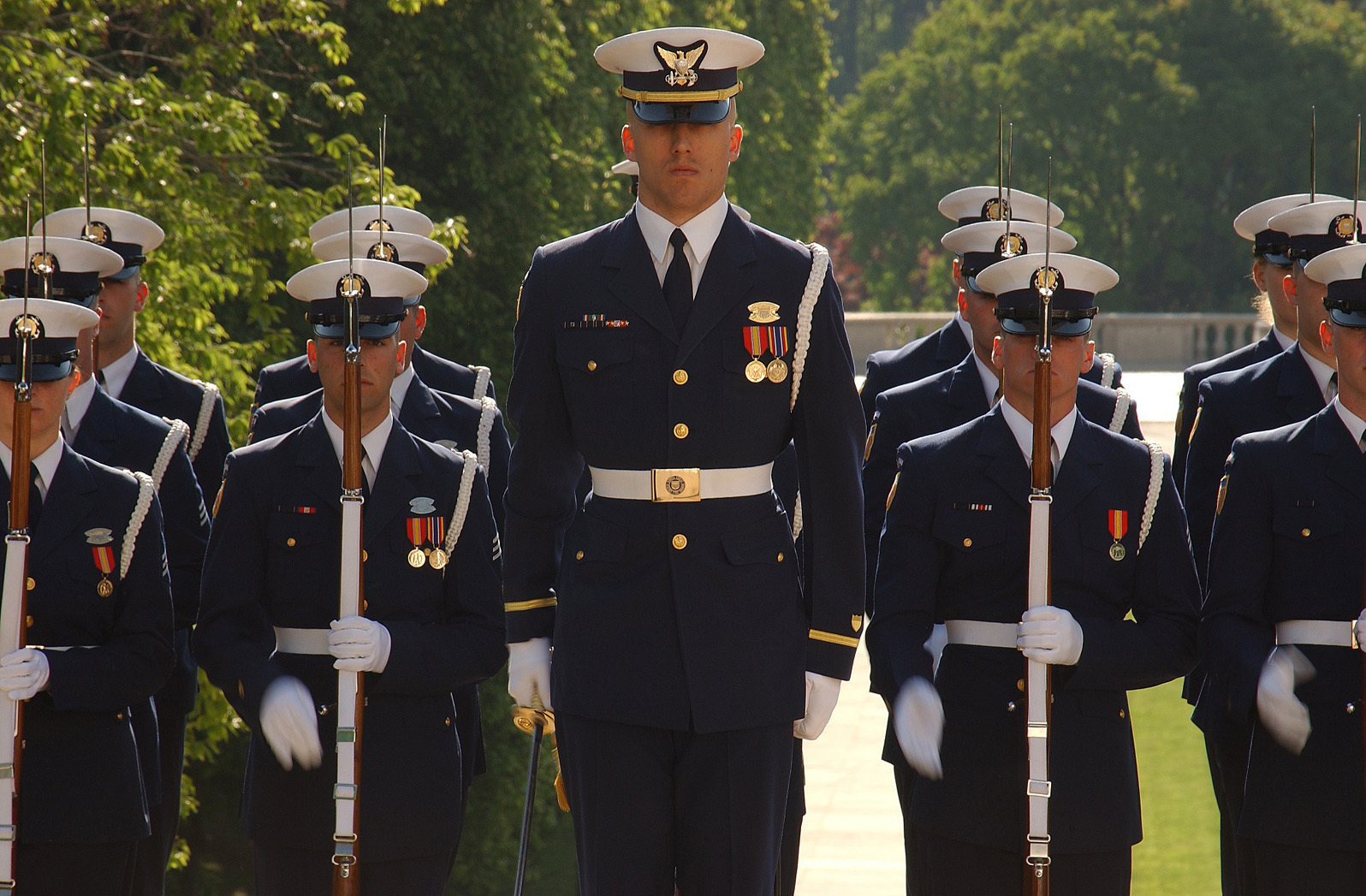
Coast Guard – CGSDU

== Current camouflage patterns ==
List of current camouflage patterns and uniforms
Branch	Camouflage pattern	Image	Notes	In use since
U.S. Army	Operational Camouflage Pattern, used for the Army Combat Uniform (ACU)		The Operational Camouflage Pattern was first issued to deployed soldiers in 2015. OCP uniform uses black thread for rank and tapes. In October 2019 the U.S. Army fully switched to Operational Camouflage Pattern (which is very similar to MultiCam) as the main camouflage for its units.	OCP: 2015
U.S. Marine Corps	MARPAT pattern, used for the Marine Corps Combat Utility Uniform (MCCUU) in two variants, woodland and desert.		The USMC's MARPAT pattern was the first digitalized (pixelated) pattern in the U.S. military, unveiled in mid-2001. It was first available in January 2002 and was mandatory by late 2004.	2002
U.S. Navy	Navy Working Uniform (NWU)		There are two variants of the camouflage. Type II desert variant authorized only for Naval Special Warfare units in desert environments; Type III woodland variant, initially authorized only for specific land based units but subsequently announced as the standard ashore working uniform for all navy sailors from October 2019 onward. Type II and III are similar in hue to MARPAT, with the former lacking the brown hues of MARPAT.	2009
U.S. Air Force	Operational Camouflage Pattern, used for the OCP uniform		Air Force replaced prior Airman Battle Uniform in 2018. Air Force OCP uniform uses spice brown thread for rank and tapes.	2018
U.S. Space Force	Operational Camouflage Pattern, used for the OCP uniform (OCP)		OCP uniform uses space blue thread for rank and tapes.	2019

== See also ==
- Military badges of the United States
- Awards and decorations of the United States Armed Forces
- I. Spiewak & Sons, manufacturers of apparel for U.S. Army, U.S. Navy, and U.S. Air Force during World War I, World War II, and Korean War
- Military uniform § United States
- State defense force#Uniforms
- Physical training uniform
- Military beret § United States
