= Helmz =

Helmz (stylized as HELMS) is a sports bicycle from Bridgestone Cycle Co., Ltd. jointly developed with fashion brand narifuri.

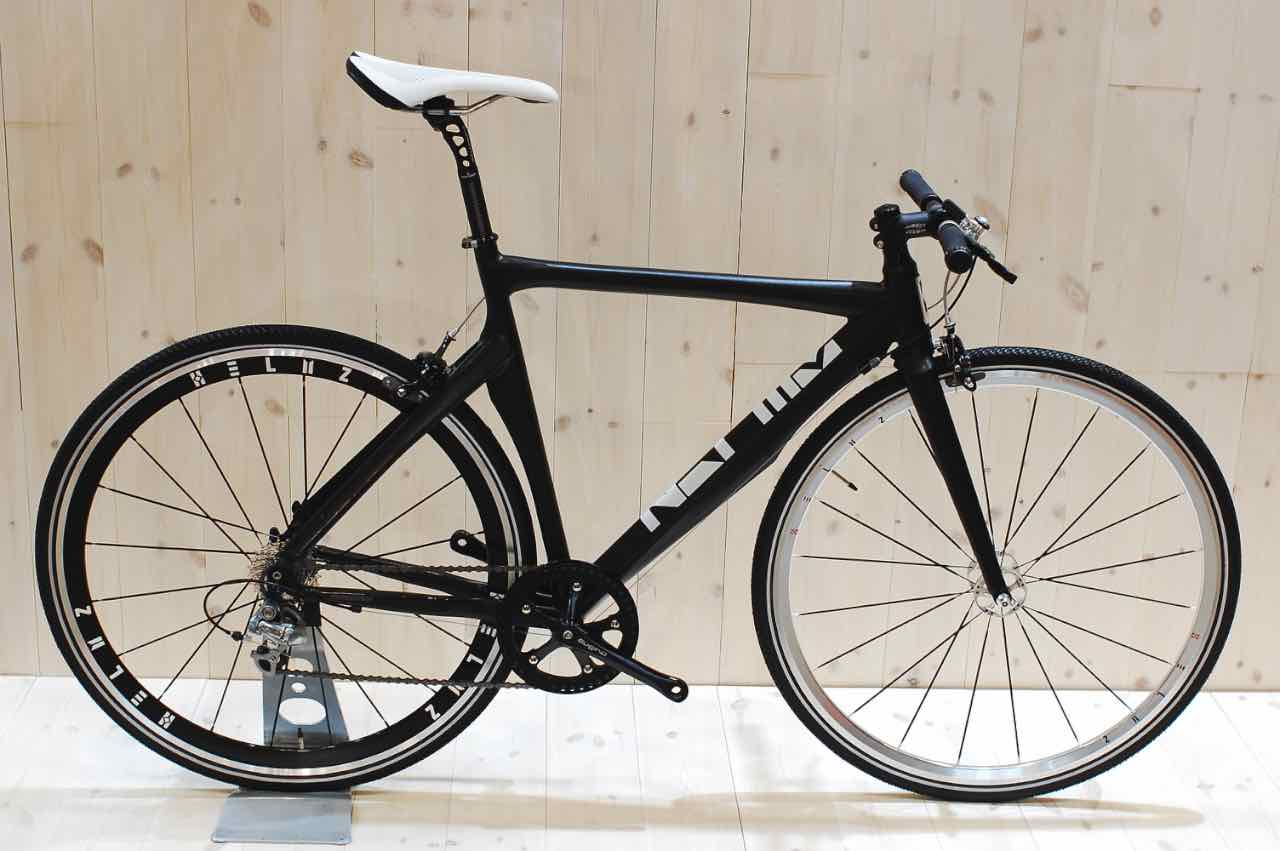
Helmz H1 2009

== Overview ==
Bridgestone Cycle's 60th-anniversary model was developed as a "bicycle to be a part of fashion" with narifuri taking charge in frame design and concept establishment. It was created with a "focus on design." The model was announced in 2009 and was sold starting in 2010.

The name HELMZ is derived from the English term "helm."

Custom-designed original parts were made for HELMZ by Japanese cycle part brands such as NITTO, MKS Pedal, and Sugino. Japanese-oriented brand parts were selected carefully to minimize the use of Shimano parts.

These original parts of HELMZ are sold as aftermarket cycle products. The entire sales plan, including the package design of selling boxes and POP, was awarded the Minister of Economy Award and the Planning Award at the 42nd JPM Creative Design Show in 2012. SR1 received the Good Design award in 2014.

== Technical features ==
=== Air pressure formed aluminum frame ===
The frame was based on a sloped, low-front, top tube design from Narifuri and was manufactured using superplastic forming which molds the frame by inflating high air pressure in the 7005 aluminum pipe. Bridgestone cycle usually used this manufacturing method to improve riding performance, but in HELMZ it was necessary to realize the design.

=== Wheels ===
The texture and rim height differ in front and rear wheels. The front wheel is silver with 35mm rim height. The rear wheel is black with 38 mm rim height. Models with high-performance sports wheels were launched afterward.

=== Thumb shifter ===
For models with gear shifts, a thumb shifter is used. This shifter is operated with the thumb, unlike the typical modern sports bicycle push bar mechanical shift.

=== Original aftermarket parts ===
Helmz's original aftermarket parts were released in 2012. Stem, handlebar, saddle, wheels, gear cranks, and most other original parts were sold on the market as aftermarket parts.

=== Belt drive ===
The belt drive equipped models, SR1 and S10, were introduced in 2013. These models were an update of Bridgestone's belt drive experience from 1980, "SSSD" (Selectable SS Solld Drive). The new belt drives were made out of carbon instead of kevlar making the belts lighter and more flexible.

== Models ==
Frame shape and concepts have not been changed since its first announcement except for the new sizes being set.

Model Name	Model Year	Composition
H1	2010 - 2011	9 speed, flat bar handle
H1X	2011 - 2013	10 speed, bull-horn handle, original design parts, high-quality cyclocross wheels
H10	2011 -	9 speed, flat handle, size 510mm added
H65	2012 -	9 speed, size 650B wheels, flat handle, size 480mm (compact model)
SR1	2013 -	SSSD (Single Speed Solid Drive), high-quality cyclocross wheels, drop handle
S10	2013 -	SSSD (Single Speed Solid Drive), riser bar handle
H2X	2014 -	10 speed, bull-horn handle, original design parts, high-quality cyclocross wheels

== Collaboration ==
=== Star Wars ===
Collaborating with Star Wars, Helmz released two 5th anniversary models in different colors. The Galactic Empire model is black-based with blue, while the Rebel Alliance model is silver based with red. The bikes were hand-painted at the Bridgestone Cycle headquarters factory.

== Awards ==
2013 Planning: JPM Minister of Economy Award in 42nd JPM Creative Design Show for Year 2012

2014 SR1: Good Design award 2014

2016 SR1: Selected as "JAPANESE DESIGN TODAY 100" in Singapore
