= Spivak =

Spivak or Spivack is a surname of Ukrainian language origin, meaning singer. It is also common among Ukrainian Jews, in which case it refers to cantor. The name may refer to:

- Charles David Spivak (1861–1927), Russian-born American medical doctor, community leader, and writer
- Charlie Spivak (1907–1982), American trumpeter and bandleader
- David Spivak (born 1978), American mathematician
- Edith I. Spivack (1910–2005), American lawyer
- Elye Spivak (1890–1950), Soviet linguist
- Gayatri Chakravorty Spivak (born 1942), Indian literary critic and professor at Columbia University
- Gordon Spivack (1928–2000), American antitrust lawyer and Justice Department official
- John L. Spivak (1897–1981), American communist reporter and author
- Lawrence Spivak (1900–1994), American journalist and publisher
- Lori Spivak (contemporary), Canadian jurist from Manitoba
- Lydia Spivak (1925–1984), Soviet soldier. Better known as the "Mistress of the Brandenburg Gate"
- Marla Spivak (born 1955), American entomologist and winner of the MacArthur Fellowship
- Maryana Spivak (born 1985), Russian actress
- Max Spivak (1906–1981), American artist
- Michael D. Spivak (1940–2020), American mathematician and author
- Mira Spivak (born 1934), Canadian politician from Manitoba; member of the Canadian Senate
- Nissan Spivak (1824–1906), Bessarabian cantor and composer
- Nova Spivack (born 1969), American internet entrepreneur
- Oleksandr Spivak (born 1975), Russian-Ukrainian football player of the FC Zenit Saint Petersburg football club
- Sidney Spivak (1928–2002), Canadian politician from Manitoba

== See also ==
- Spivak pronoun, a gender-neutral pronoun named after Michael Spivak
- Śpiewak, Polish surname
