= Robert Christopher =

American journalist

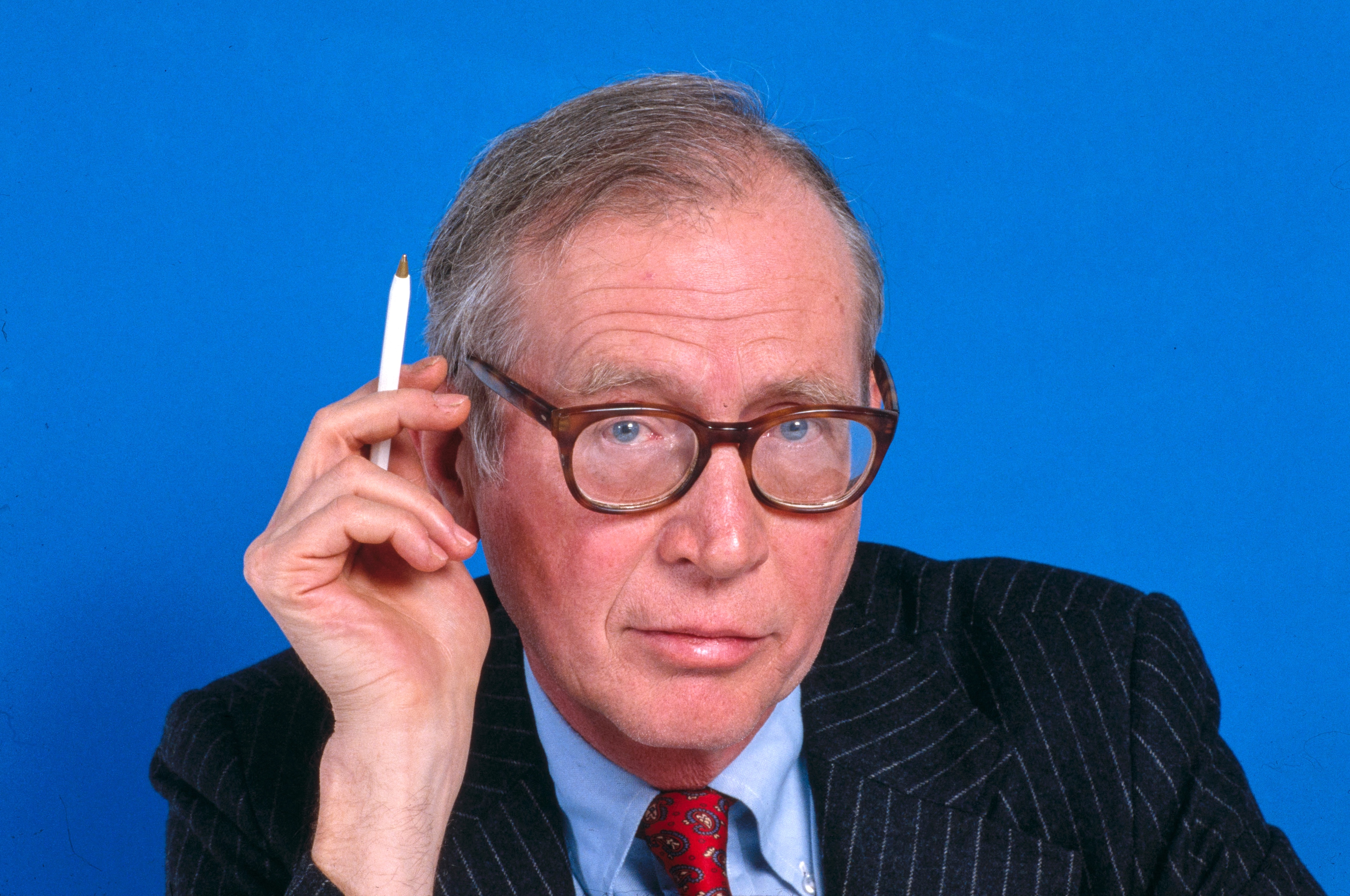
- Born: March 3, 1924; Thomaston, Connecticut, U.S.
- Died: June 14, 1992 (aged 68); New London, Connecticut, U.S.
- Occupations: Journalist, editor
- Relatives: Edith I. Spivack (mother-in-law)

Robert Collins Christopher (March 3, 1924 – June 14, 1992) was an American journalist who specialized in coverage of Japanese business and culture. From 1981 until his death, he served as administrator of the Pulitzer Prizes.

== Early life, military service, and education ==
A native of Thomaston, Connecticut, Christopher served in the United States Army during World War II in an intelligence capacity in the Pacific Theater of Operations (including the Occupation of Japan) from 1943 to 1946. Thereafter, he was graduated from Yale University with a B.A. in Oriental Studies (conferred Phi Beta Kappa with exceptional distinction in the major) as a member of Elihu in 1948. After brief stints with Investment Dealers Digest (1949–50) and Time (1950), he completed a second Army tour as an intelligence officer during the Korean War.

== Career ==
Following the conflict, he returned to Time, where he was promoted to associate editor (1956–1961) and thence senior editor of the United States and world business sections (1961–1963). He held a variety of positions at Newsweek over the next sixteen years, including foreign editor (1963–1969), executive editor (1969–1972), founding editor of the periodical's international edition (1972–1977) and contributing editor (1977–1979). From 1979 to 1981, he was managing editor of GEO.

Christopher served as the secretary of Pulitzer Prize Board and administrator of the Prizes at Columbia University (where he also taught as an adjunct professor of journalism) from 1981 until his death. He was the first Prize administrator to be recruited directly from the profession; both his immediate predecessor (Richard T. Baker) and the inaugural secretary (John Hohenberg) were already tenured members of the faculty of the Columbia University Graduate School of Journalism upon assuming the post. During this period, he wrote several books on international business and contemporary affairs, including The Japanese Mind: The Goliath Explained (1983) and Crashing the Gates: The De-WASPing of America's Power Elite (1989).

He was a member of the Council on Foreign Relations and the Century Association.

== Personal life ==
Christopher resided in Old Lyme, Connecticut. He married his second wife, Rita Goldstein, daughter of lawyers Edith I. Spivack and Bernard Goldstein, in 1970. He was survived by six children when he died from emphysema on June 14, 1992, at the age of 68 in New London, Connecticut.

Upon his death, Pulitzer Prize Board chair Claude Sitton remarked that Christopher was "personally a warm and wonderful fellow who was admired by all."
