= Physical training uniform =

Military/organizational uniform

A physical training uniform is a military or organizational uniform used during exercise, calisthenics, drills, and in some cases, very casual periods of time (off-duty time during Initial Entry Training in the U.S. Army, for example). Most militaries, especially the United States Armed Forces and their auxiliaries (e.g. ROTC and JROTC components) require use of a physical training (PT) uniform during unit exercise (including formation runs, calisthenics, and conditioning exercises). All items worn by military personnel conducting PT as a group are subject to uniformity, at the commander's discretion; however, some U.S. military units produce unique T-shirts with their unit insignia and motto, and for special events, this shirt is part of the uniform. Occasionally, exercise will also be conducted in that branch's utility uniforms, normally with the blouse removed and the undershirt exposed (also known as "boots and utes" ). For unit runs, esprit de corps or special occasions, commanders may have personnel wear unique T-shirts with the distinctive unit insignia and unit colors.

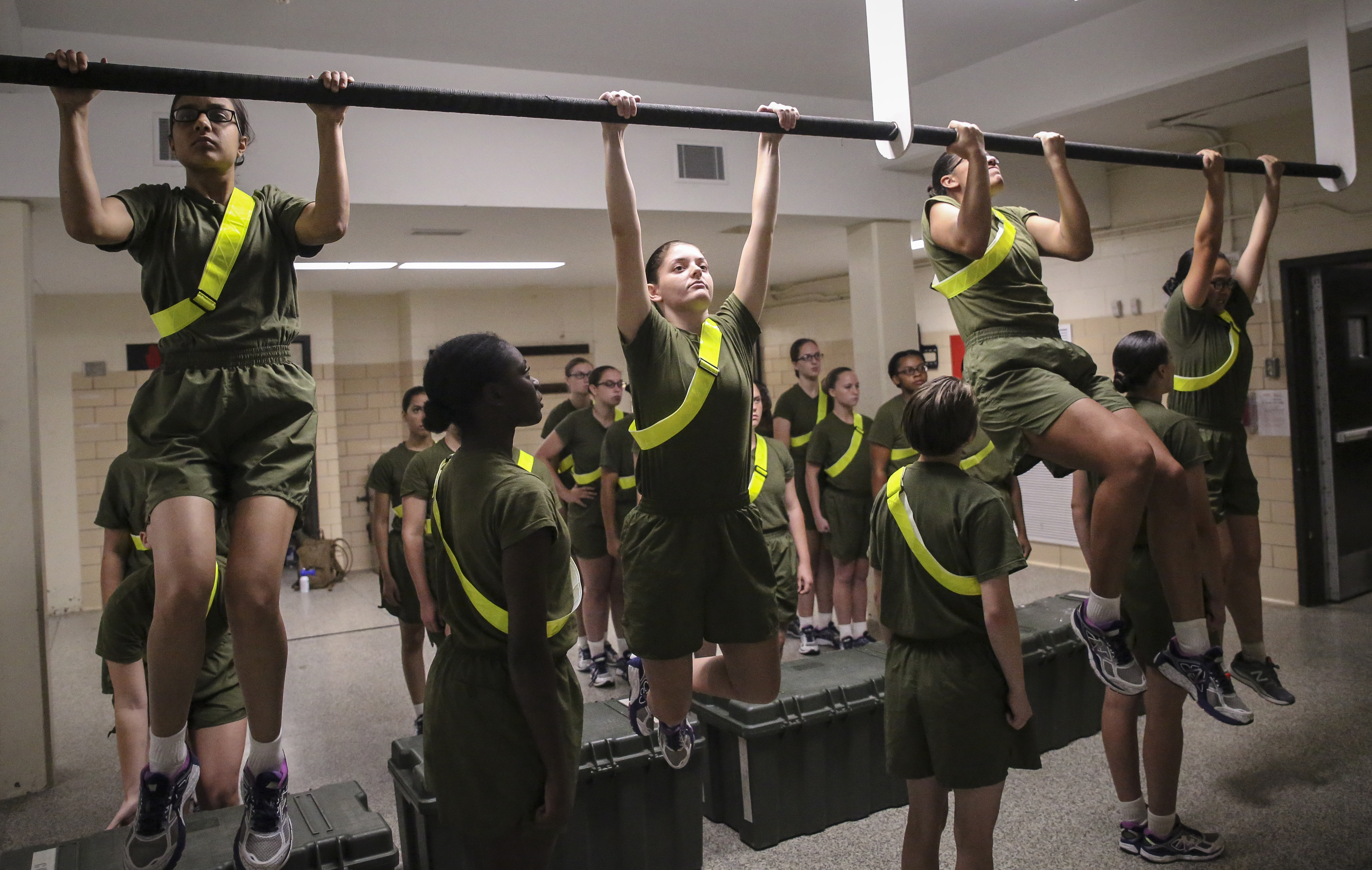
Marine recruits conducting PT with reflective belts

== Physical training uniforms of the United States Armed Forces ==
=== Army ===
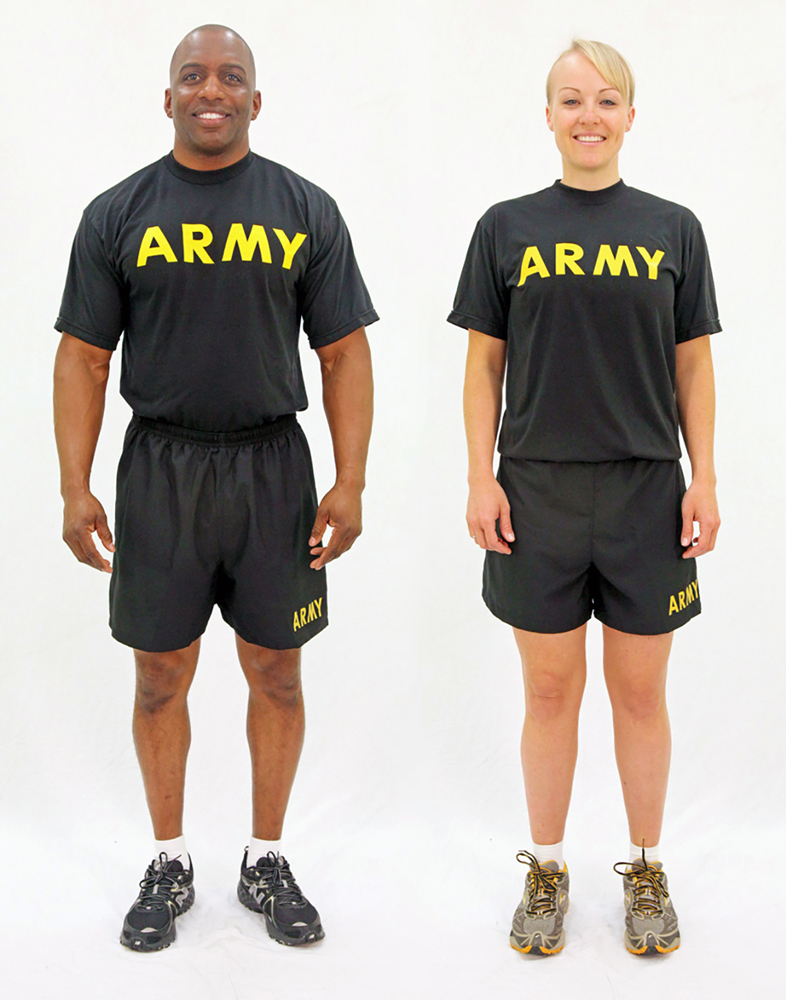
The Army Physical Fitness Uniform (APFU) in warm weather configuration

The Army Physical Fitness Uniform (APFU) consists of:

- Shirts: Black long-sleeve and short-sleeve shirts with gold ARMY lettering on the front.
- Shorts: Black with same gold ARMY lettering on the left leg. Multipurpose: can be worn alone for swimming and exercise, or under the black pants.
- Pants: Black with Army Star logo and lettering on the left thigh.
- Jacket: Black with gold chevron across the front and back and same Army Star logo and lettering on the left chest.
- Socks and shoes: Commercial calf-length or ankle-length, plain white or black socks with no logos, and approved, well-fitting, comfortable running shoes with no color restriction; Five-toed shoes are prohibited.

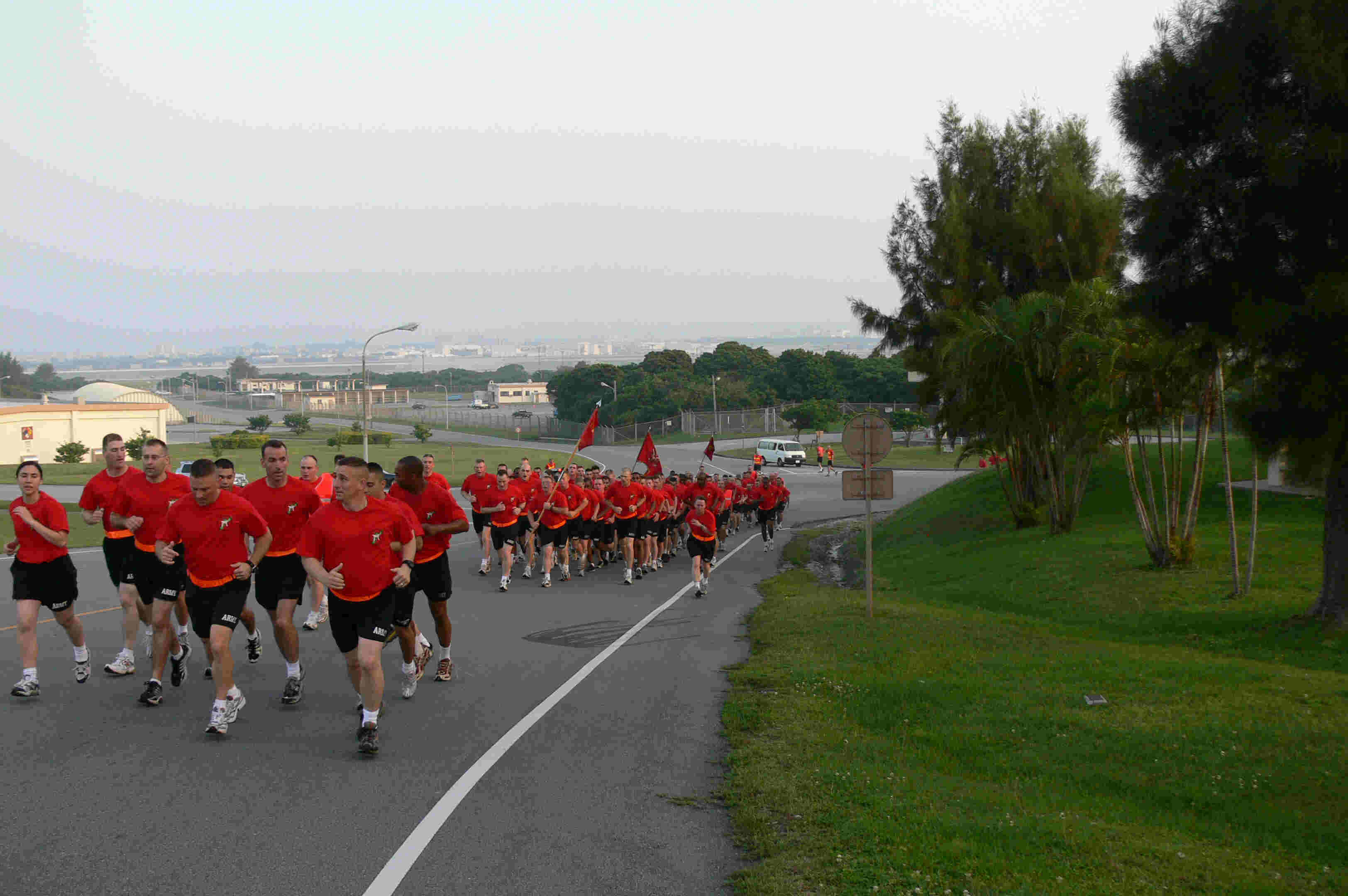
Soldiers wearing special unit T-shirts

=== Marine Corps ===
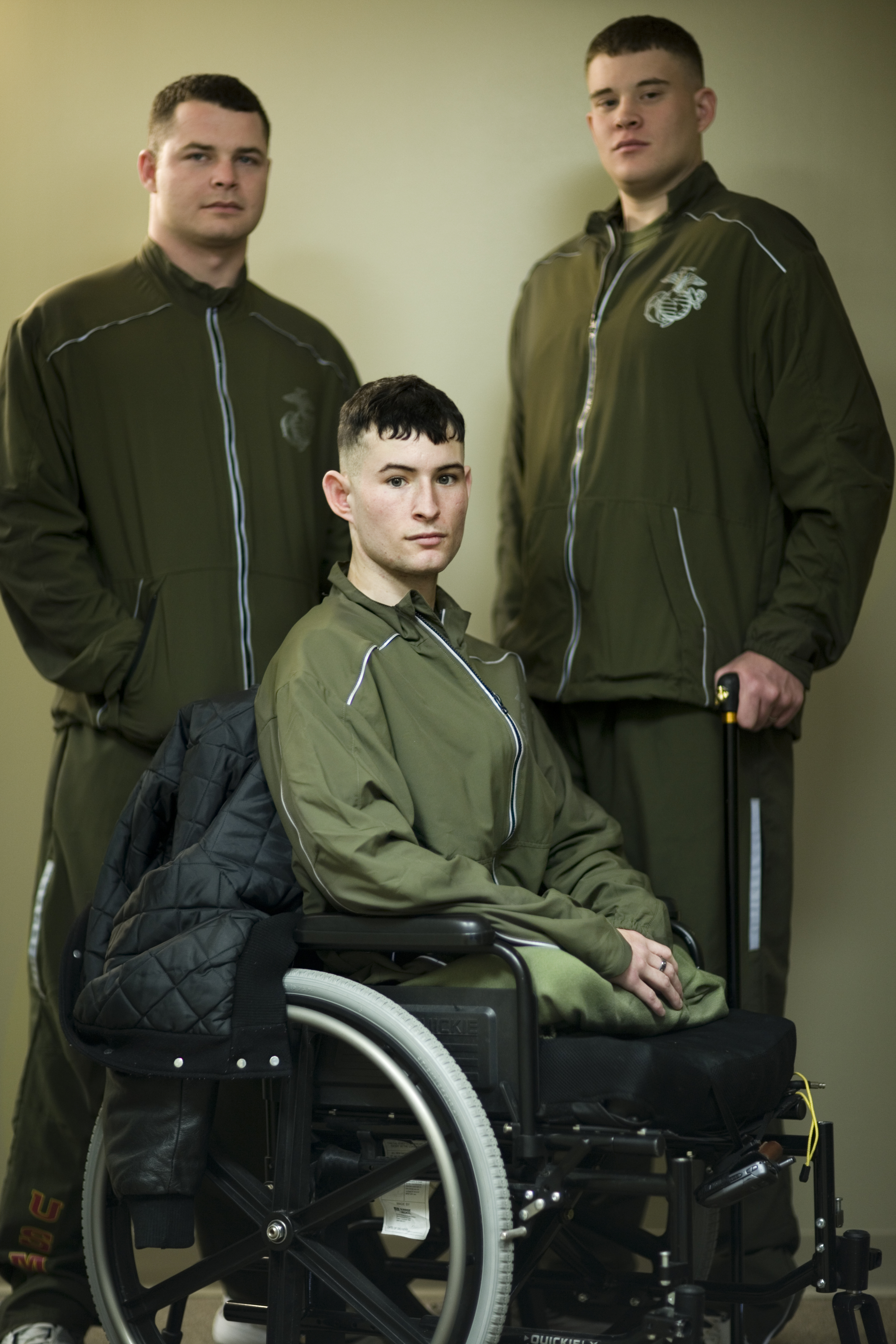
Marines from the Wounded Warrior Regiment wearing the Marine Corps PT tracksuit

The Marine Corps PTUs consist of:

- Shirt: Plain olive-drab green short-sleeve shirt (logos can be authorized.)
- Shorts: Plain OD green shorts (logos can be authorized for this also.)
- Sweatsuit: OD green with black Marines logo and USMC lettering on the left chest of the sweatshirt, and the same design on the left thigh of the sweatpants.
- Tracksuit: OD green with reflective piping, reflective Marines logo on the left chest and MARINES lettering in red with gold outline centered on the back of jacket, and same logo on the upper left thigh and vertical USMC lettering in the same design on the lower right leg of pants.
- Socks and Shoes: commercial calf-length or ankle-length, plain white or black socks with no logos, and shoes with appropriate civilian design; excessively bright coloring or designs are prohibited.

=== Navy ===
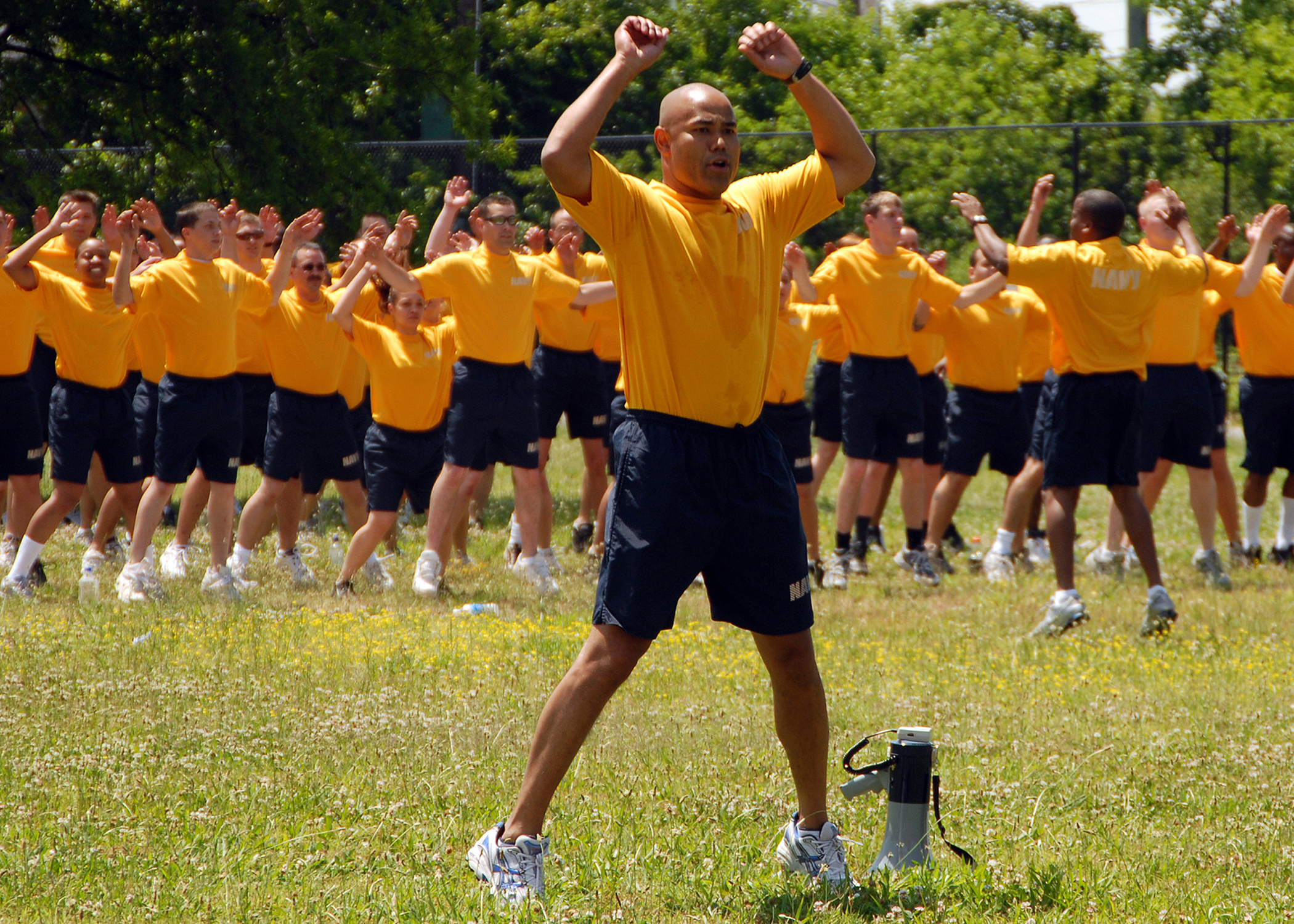
Sailors wearing the Navy's soon-to-be-retired gold-variant PTU

The Navy PTUs consist of:

- Shirt: Navy blue short-sleeve shirt with gold eagle-and-anchor logo on the left chest and the statement "America's Navy: Forged By The Sea" in gold on the back.
- Shorts: Navy blue with gold NAVY lettering on the left leg.
- Tracksuit: Styled similar to the Marines' except dark navy blue with same gold NAVY lettering on the left chest and on the back of jacket, only larger, and styled vertically on the lower right leg of pants.
- Sweatsuit: Navy blue with reflective NAVY lettering on the same areas on the sweatshirt with optional hood, and on the left thigh of the sweatpants.
- Shoes: Approved, well-fitting, comfortable running shoes with no color restriction.

A retirement date for the Navy's gold-shirt PT uniform is planned to take place in 2027, after 20 years of use.

=== Air Force ===
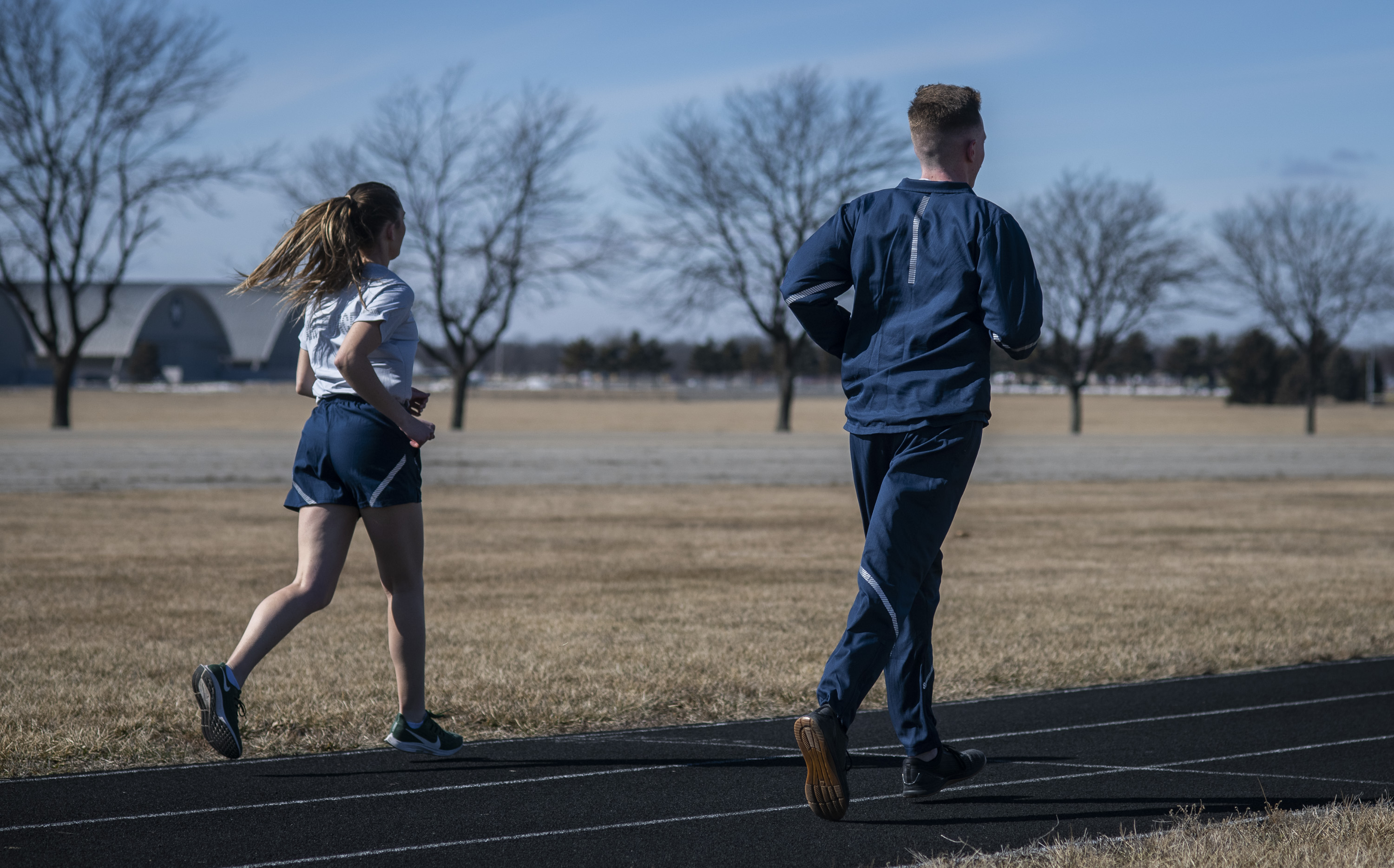
Airmen wearing the Air Force Physical Training Gear (PTG)

The Air Force Physical Training Gear (PTG) consists of:

- Shirts and Sweatshirt: Light-grey short-sleeve, long-sleeve, and sweatshirt with reflective Air Force logo on the left chest, reflective stripes on the sleeves, and reflective AIR FORCE lettering centered on the back. Similar to the Navy, the sweatshirt has an optional hood.
- Shorts: Blue runner and regular-length shorts with reflective stripes on the legs and the same AF logo on the left leg.
- Pants: Blue with same reflective stripes on the lower legs and same AF logo on the upper left leg.
- Jacket: Blue with same AF logo on the left chest, and same reflective stripes on the sleeves and upper back.
- Socks and Shoes: Athletic-style shoes with no color restriction, and white and black socks; small logos are authorized. Additionally, for Air Force training, soft & comfortable shoes are best for walking & running.

A retirement date for the Air Force's Improved Physical Training Uniform is currently pending.

=== Space Force ===
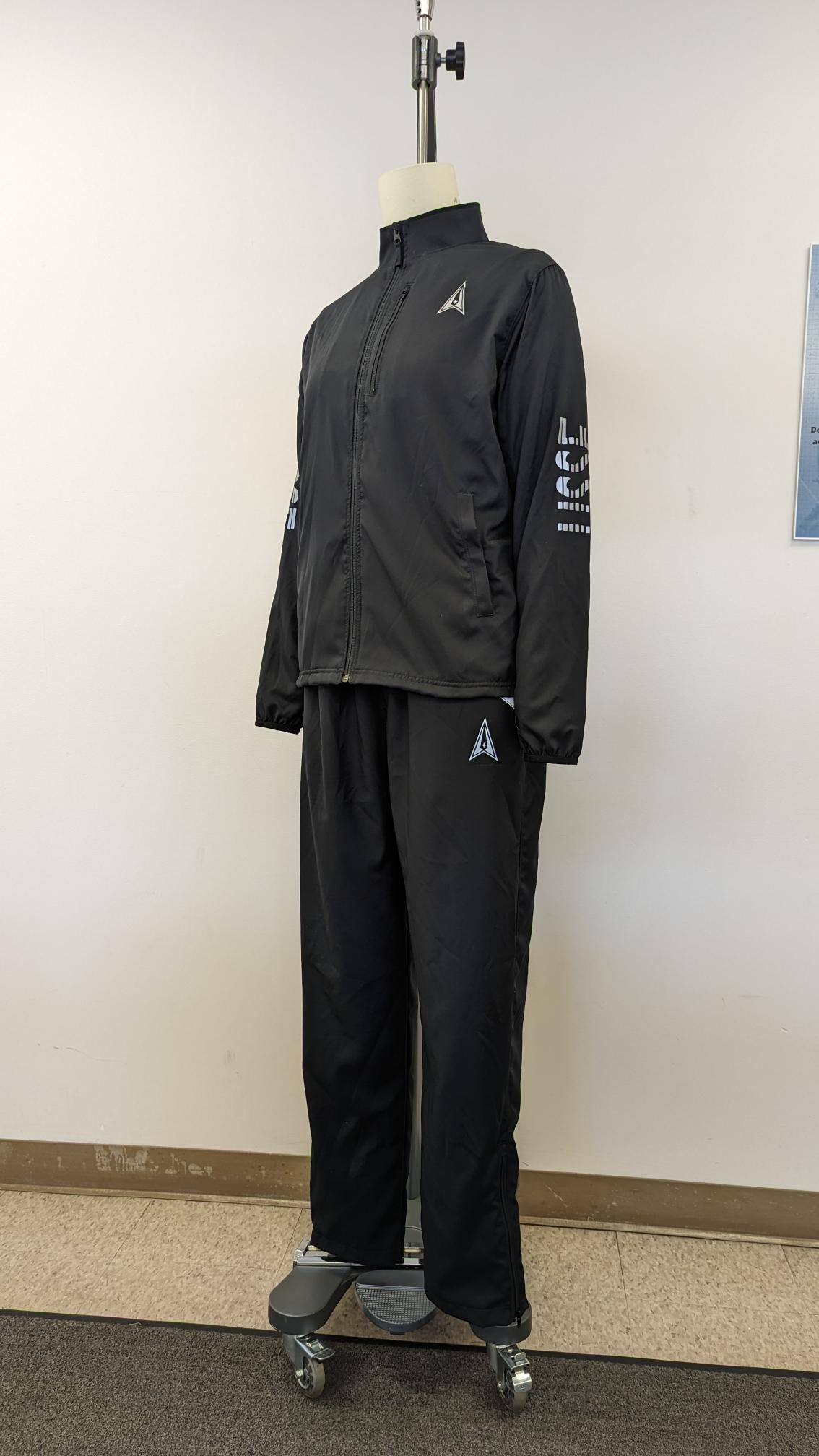
The first prototype of the Space Force PTU in cold weather configuration

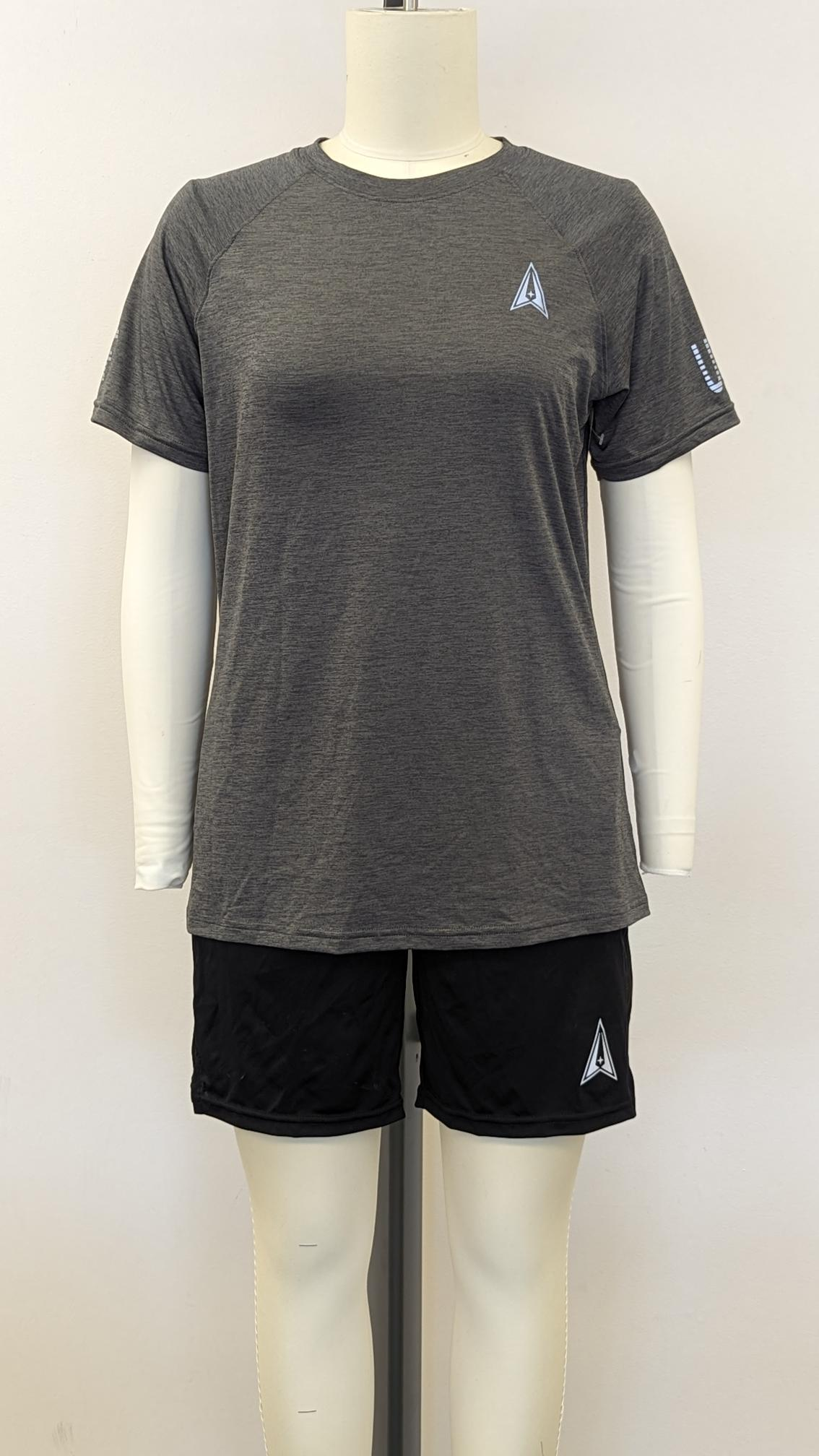
The first prototype of the SFPTU in warm weather configuration

The Space Force Physical Training Gear (PTG) consists of:

- Shirt: Styled similar to the Air Force's except dark grey with Space Force logo on the left chest, reflective USSF lettering on the sleeves, and reflective SPACE FORCE lettering centered on the back.
- Shorts: Similar to the Air Force, black runner and regular-length shorts with the same SF logo on the left leg.
- Pants: Black with same SF logo on the left leg, like the shorts.
- Jacket: Black with the same logo and lettering as on the shirt, but with an additional SF logo on the upper back, only larger.

=== Coast Guard ===
The Coast Guard PTUs consist of:

- Shirt: Grey short-sleeve shirt with navy blue Coast Guard logo with white lettering on the left chest.
- Shorts: Navy blue shorts with white USCG lettering styled vertically on the left leg.
- Sweatsuit: Navy blue with COAST GUARD lettering in orange with white and dark reflective outline centered on the front and 7 dark reflective stripes on the back of the sweatshirt, and USCG lettering in the same design on the sides of both legs of the sweatpants.
- Swimsuits: Plain blue gender-standard swimsuits.
- Socks and Shoes: White and black socks (small logos are authorized), and athletic-style shoes; excessively bright coloring or designs are prohibited.

== Non-military use ==
In many parts of the world outside of use in militaries, physical training uniforms are primarily used in schools, law enforcement academies, and in some cases, scouting, firefighter training and prison systems.

== See also ==
- Uniforms of the United States Armed Forces
- Military uniform
  - Full dress uniform
  - Mess dress uniform
  - Service dress uniform
  - Combat uniform
  - Military beret
- Casual wear
  - Work wear
  - Sportswear
