= Edith I. Spivack =

American lawyer (1910–2005)

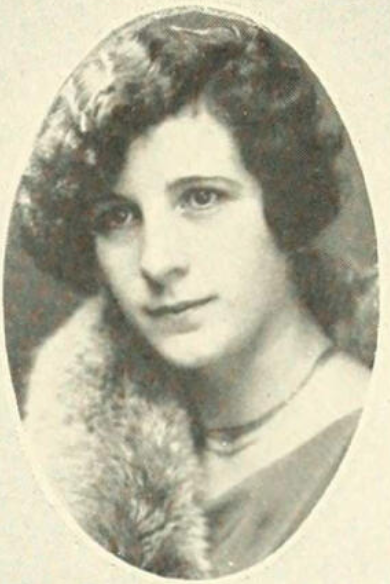
- Spivack, from the 1929 yearbook of Barnard College
- Born: April 19, 1910; New York, New York, U.S.
- Died: July 26, 2005 (aged 95); Manhasset, New York, U.S.
- Occupation: Lawyer
- Relatives: Robert Christopher (son-in-law)

Edith I. Spivack (April 19, 1910 – July 26, 2005) was an American lawyer. She was one of the first women to graduate from Columbia Law School, and she was a lawyer for the City of New York for seventy years, specializing in tax law. She is recognized as New York City's "longest serving civil servant."

== Early life and education ==
Spivack was born and raised in New York City. She graduated from Barnard College in 1929, and earned her law degree from Columbia Law School in 1932, one of the first women to earn a law degree at Columbia.

== Career ==
Spivack worked in the Law Department of the City of New York from 1934 to 1995, and volunteered there after she officially retired. She oversaw the collection of water and sewer fees from consulates and private universities in 1980, during the administration of Mayor Ed Koch. In her eighties, she was fifth-ranking attorney in the Law Department, and she was considered the city's longest-serving civil servant.

The Fund for the City of New York presented Spivack with an award for outstanding public service in 1975. The New York State Bar Association honored her in 1997, and in 1998 the New York County Lawyers' Association named an annual prize for her. She received the Lawrence A. Wein Prize in Social Responsibility in 2002.

== Personal life ==
Spivack married fellow lawyer Bernard H. Goldstein in 1933. They had two daughters. Her daughter Rita married journalist Robert Christopher, executive editor of Newsweek magazine. Her husband died in 1998, and she died in 2005, at the age of 95, in Manhasset, New York.
