= I. Spiewak & Sons =

I. Spiewak & Sons, Inc.
- Company type: Private
- Industry: Apparel manufacturing
- Founder: Isaac Spiewak
- Headquarters: New York City, USA
- Area served: International
- Key people: Roy Spiewak (President and CEO)
- Products: Uniform outerwear
- Website: Spiewak.com

I. Spiewak & Sons, Inc., commonly known simply as Spiewak, is a New York-based apparel manufacturer founded in 1904. Spiewak currently manufactures high-visibility safety apparel, EMS protective gear, and other uniforms for private businesses and government agencies. Spiewak also offers a line of consumer outerwear.

Spiewak uniform products include "VizGuard" safety wear, "WeatherTech" waterproof/breathable outerwear, "Titan" outerwear, and "Golden Fleece" industrial outerwear.

== Customers ==
Spiewak produces uniform outerwear for:

- Federal Bureau of Investigation
- United States Customs
- Bureau of Alcohol, Tobacco, Firearms and Explosives
- United States Secret Service
- Drug Enforcement Administration
- US Postal Service
- California Highway Patrol
- Metropolitan Transportation Authority
- Port Authority Bus Terminal
- New York City Department of Sanitation
- New York City Police Department
- Los Angeles Police Department
- San Francisco Police Department
- Miami Police Department
- Atlanta Police Department
- Chicago Police Department
- American Airlines
- Avis Rent a Car System
- Budget Rent a Car
- Israel Police

The company also offers a line of consumer outerwear constructed with "workwear" values.

== History ==
Isaac Spiewak grew up in Warsaw, Poland and fled to America in 1903. It was there, in Brooklyn, NY, that he started a small family business, making sheepskin vests by hand and selling them on the docks of Williamsburg in 1904. By 1906, Isaac's vests were in sufficient demand around New York for him to establish a small manufacturing space in Brooklyn, calling it "House of the Golden Fleece". The moniker "Golden Fleece" was first branded in 1919.

As his brothers entered into various facets of the outerwear business, the Spiewaks developed different, and sometimes competing, lines and companies to capitalize on prevailing trends and emerging market segments. Among the brands the Spiewaks created were Bronco Manufacturing, Ram Manufacturing, United Sheeplined Clothing Company, Spiewak Brothers, Swiss Blouse, Excalibur, Frost King, Pan-Jac, Trappings, Prince Jason, and Flight Deck USA.

During World War I, Spiewak produced wool coats and breeches for the US Army and Navy, including pea coats, which are still made by the company today. During World War II, jackets and flight coats were produced for the US Military including styles such as B-9/B-11 parkas, A-1/A-2, B-10/B-15 flight jackets, B-3/D-1/D-3 flight suits, M-41/M-43 field jackets/N-1 deck jackets, N-2/N-3 snorkel parkas, and T-1 tanker jackets. During the Korean War, Spiewak continued to make WWII styles for the military, and added G-8WEP flight jackets and M-52 field jackets.

Michael Spiewak, the longtime face of Spiewak Clothing, died in October 2007.
