= MultiCam =

Camouflage pattern

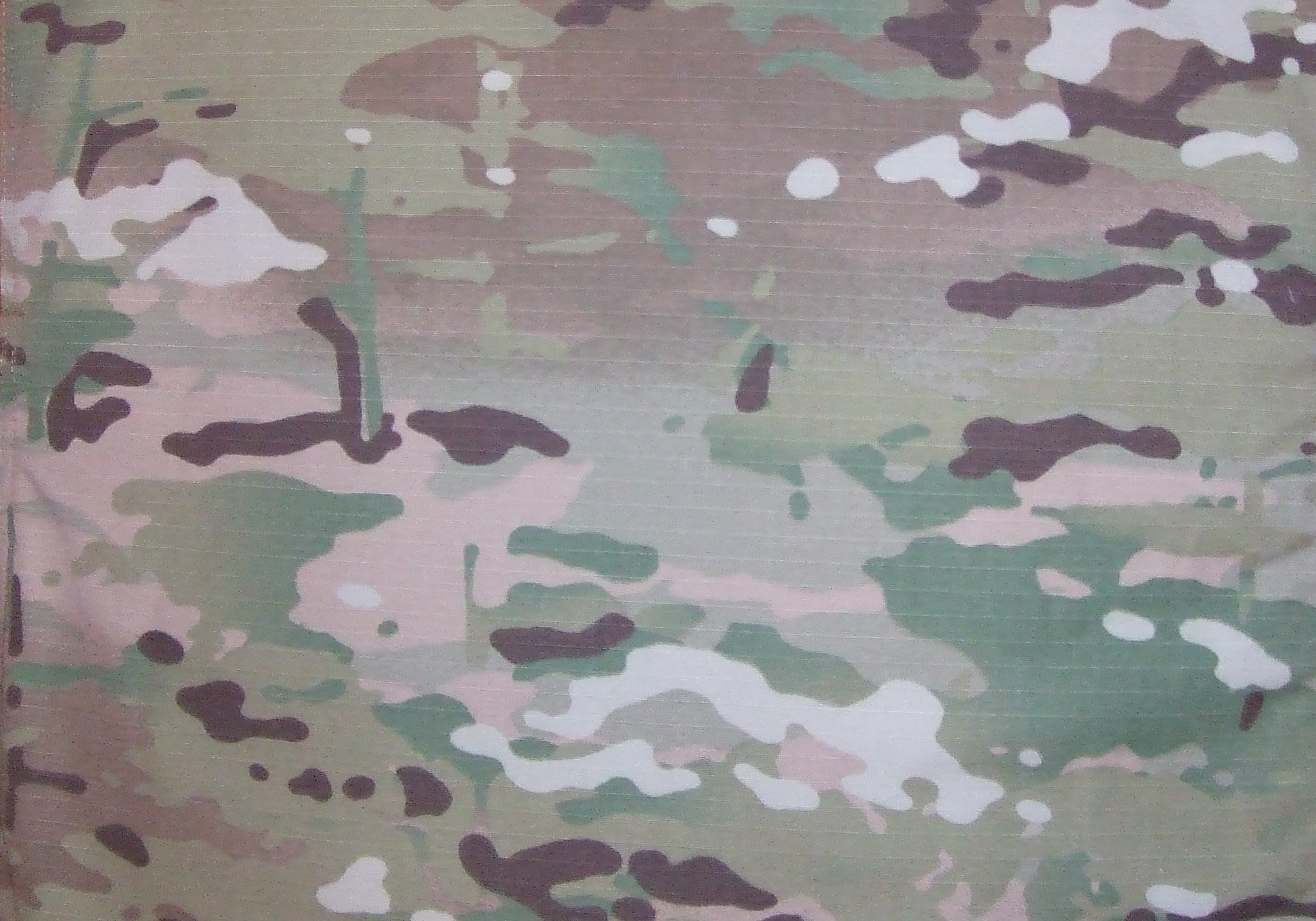
- MultiCam swatch
- Type: Military camouflage pattern
- Place of origin: United States

Service history
- In service: 2004–present
- Used by: See Users
- Wars: War in Afghanistan; Iraq War; Syrian Civil War; Mali War; Papuan Insurgency; Russo-Ukrainian War; War in Donbas; Russian invasion of Ukraine

Production history
- Designer: Crye Precision
- Designed: 2002
- Manufacturer: Crye Precision; MultiCam variants made in other countries
- Produced: 2002–present
- Variants: Arid, Tropic, Alpine, Black; See Variants for MultiCam patterns made in other countries

MultiCam is a camouflage pattern designed for use in a wide range of environments and conditions which was developed and is produced by American company Crye Precision. The pattern has found extensive adoption globally. Variants of it, some unlicensed, are in use with militaries worldwide, particularly with special forces and special operations units.

The pattern is also available for purchase for civilian usage. Derived from the original standard pattern, additional specified variants were developed and later introduced in late 2013, those are "Arid", "Tropic", "Alpine" and "Black".

== History ==
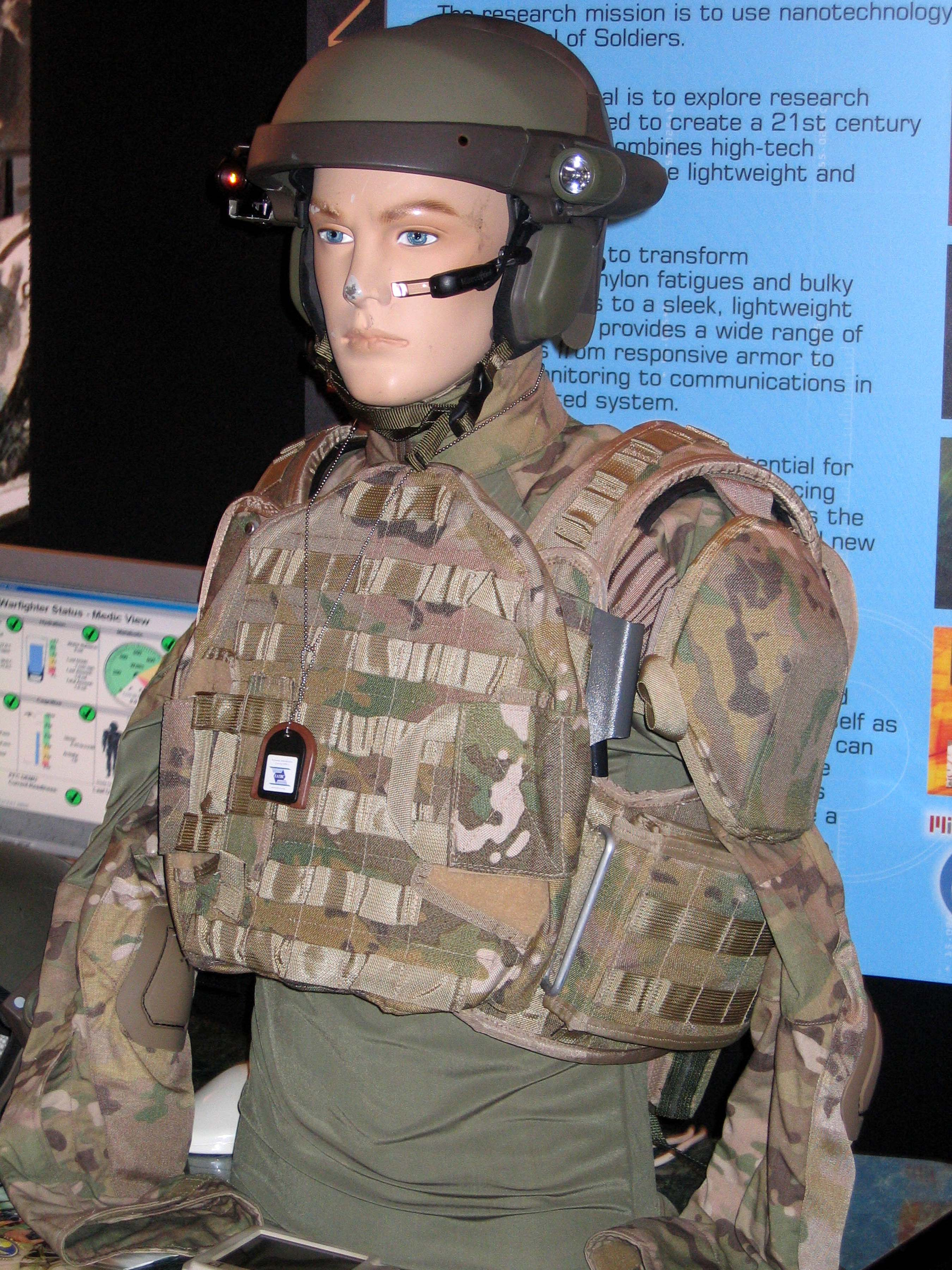
A mannequin wearing an early prototype of a MultiCam combat shirt in July 2004

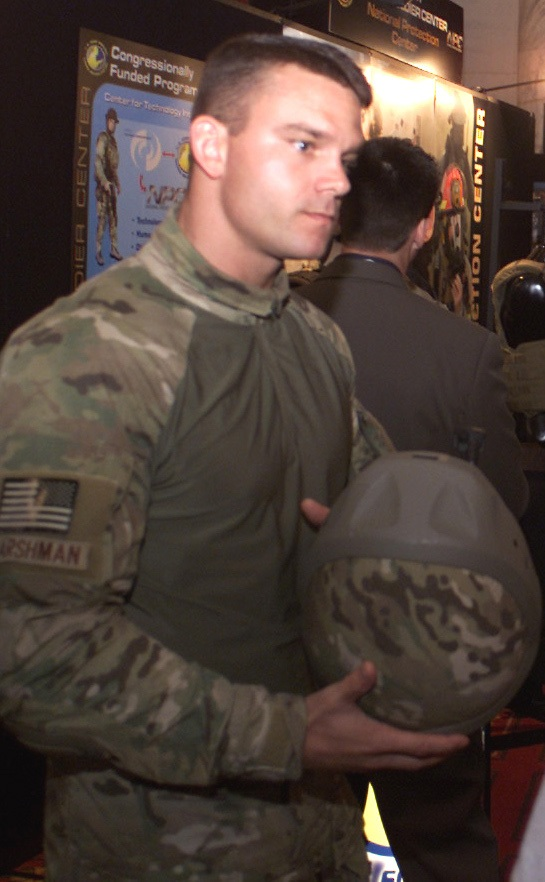
A U.S. Army soldier at the U.S. Capitol in June 2005, modelling an early prototype MultiCam combat shirt at a military technology convention

First designed and unveiled in 2002, MultiCam was designed for the use of the U.S. Army in varied environments, seasons, elevations, and light conditions. It is a seven-color, multi-environment camouflage pattern developed by Crye Precision in conjunction with United States Army Soldier Systems Center.

The pattern was included in the U.S. Army's move to replace the 3-Color Desert and Woodland patterns, but in 2004 the U.S. Army chose the Universal Camouflage Pattern that came to be used in the Army Combat Uniform. Nonetheless, it remained in limited use by the U.S. Army special forces in the mid-to-late 2000s in Iraq and Afghanistan. MultiCam was also continually trialed for its "Future Force Warrior" program demonstrations.

== Development ==
On 25 November 2013, Crye Precision unveiled a family of MultiCam variants, which they claim can reduce the visual and near-IR signature of a person operating in different environments.

== Appearance ==
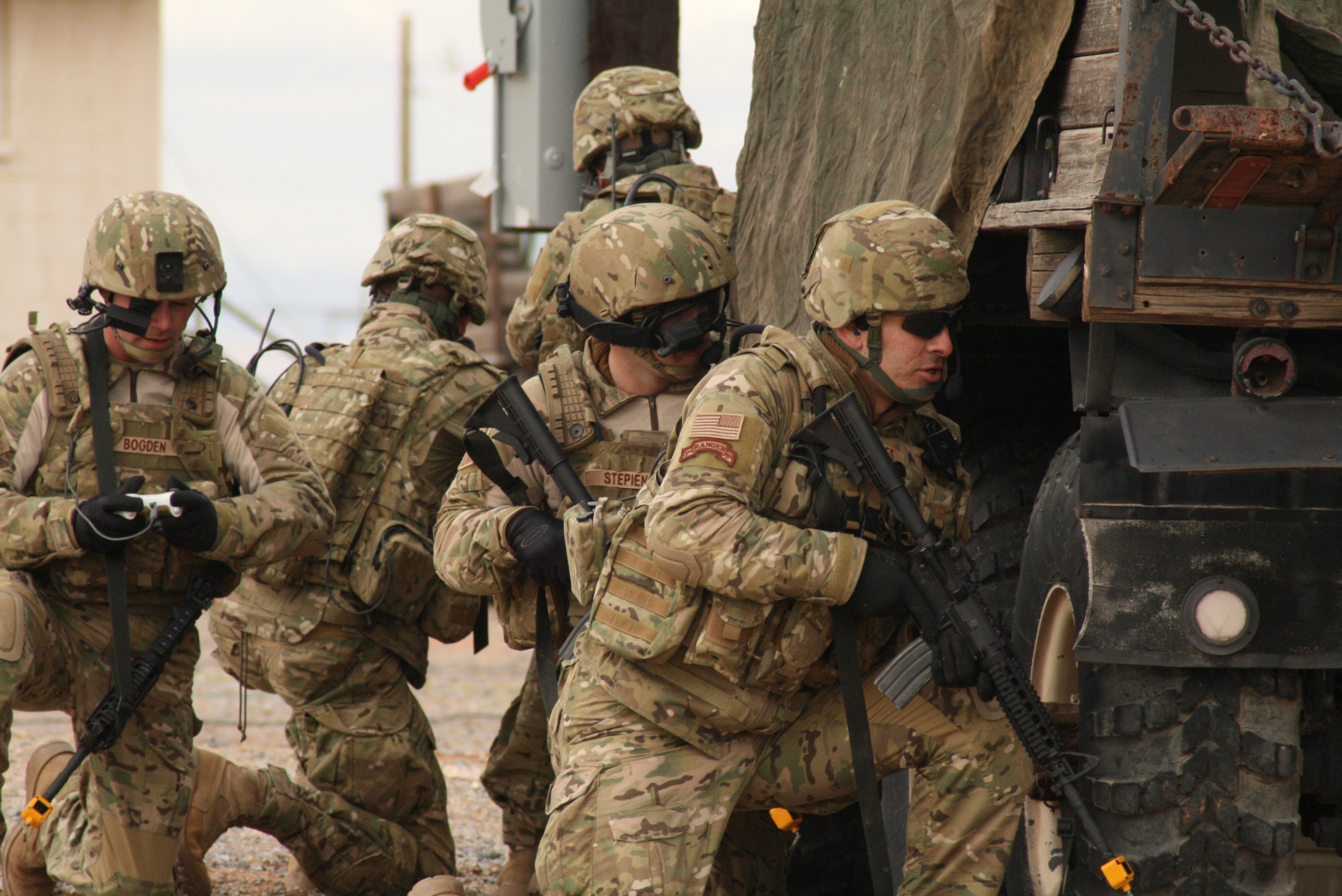
U.S. Army Rangers of 3rd Battalion, 75th Ranger Regiment wearing MultiCam while demonstrating the Future Force Warrior project at Fort Bliss, Texas, in February 2007

MultiCam has a background of a brown to light tan gradient, overprinted with a dark green, olive green, and lime green gradient and a top layer of opaque dark brown and cream-colored shapes spread throughout the pattern.

This allows for the overall appearance to change from predominantly green to predominantly brown in different areas of the fabric, while having smaller shapes to break up the larger background areas.

The MultiCam color scheme in hex triplet is as follows:(i) Cream 524 B8A78B; (ii) Dark Brown 530 48352F; (iii) Tan 525 967860; (iv) Brown 529 6F573F; (v) Dark Green 528 5A613F; (vi) Olive 527 8C7D50; and (vii) Pale Green 526 85755C.

MultiCam is available for commercial sale to civilians.

=== Variants ===
There are 4 variants from the original MultiCam.

==== Arid ====
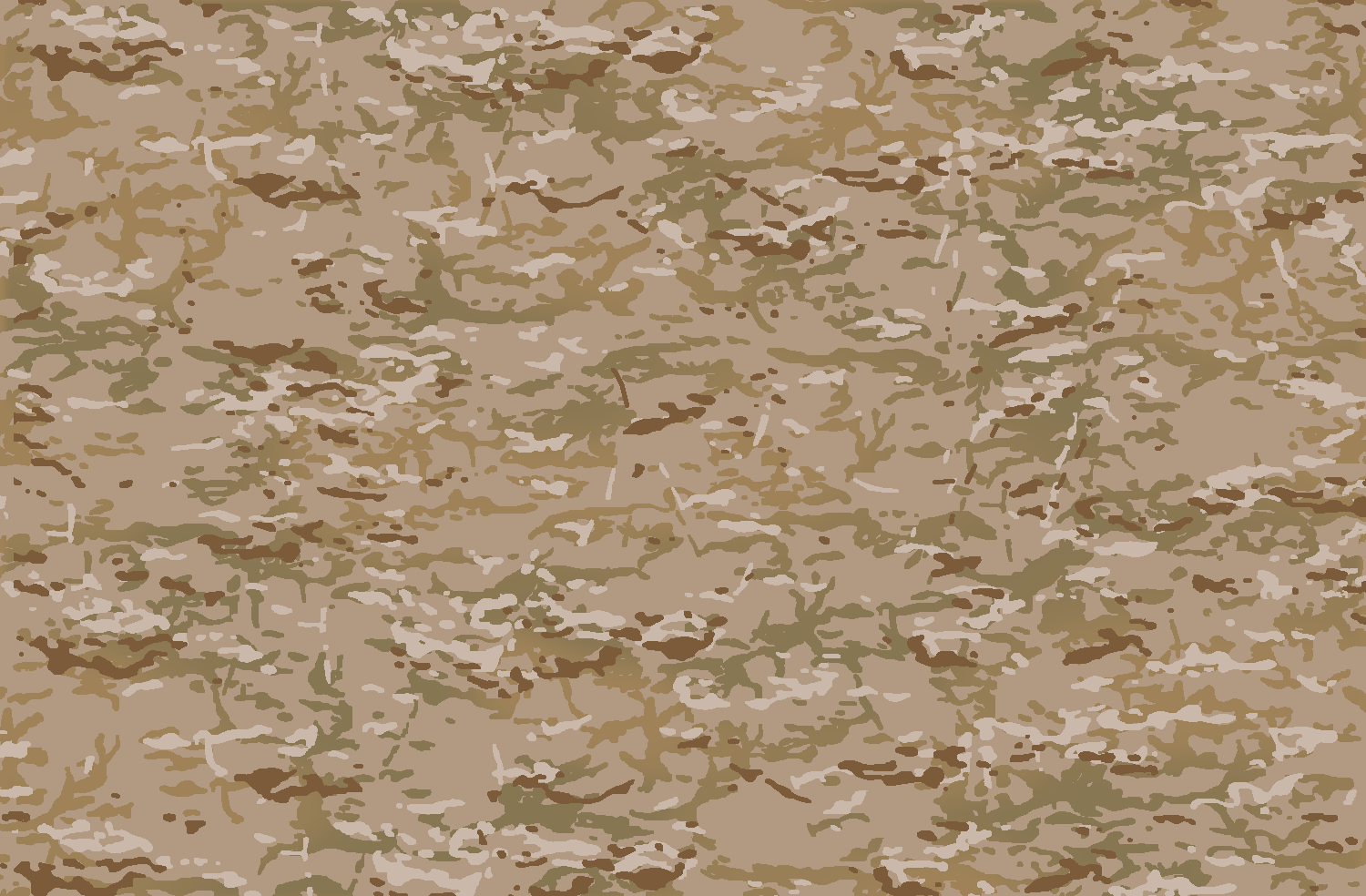
Arid MultiCam

For users operating in desert environments.

==== Tropic ====
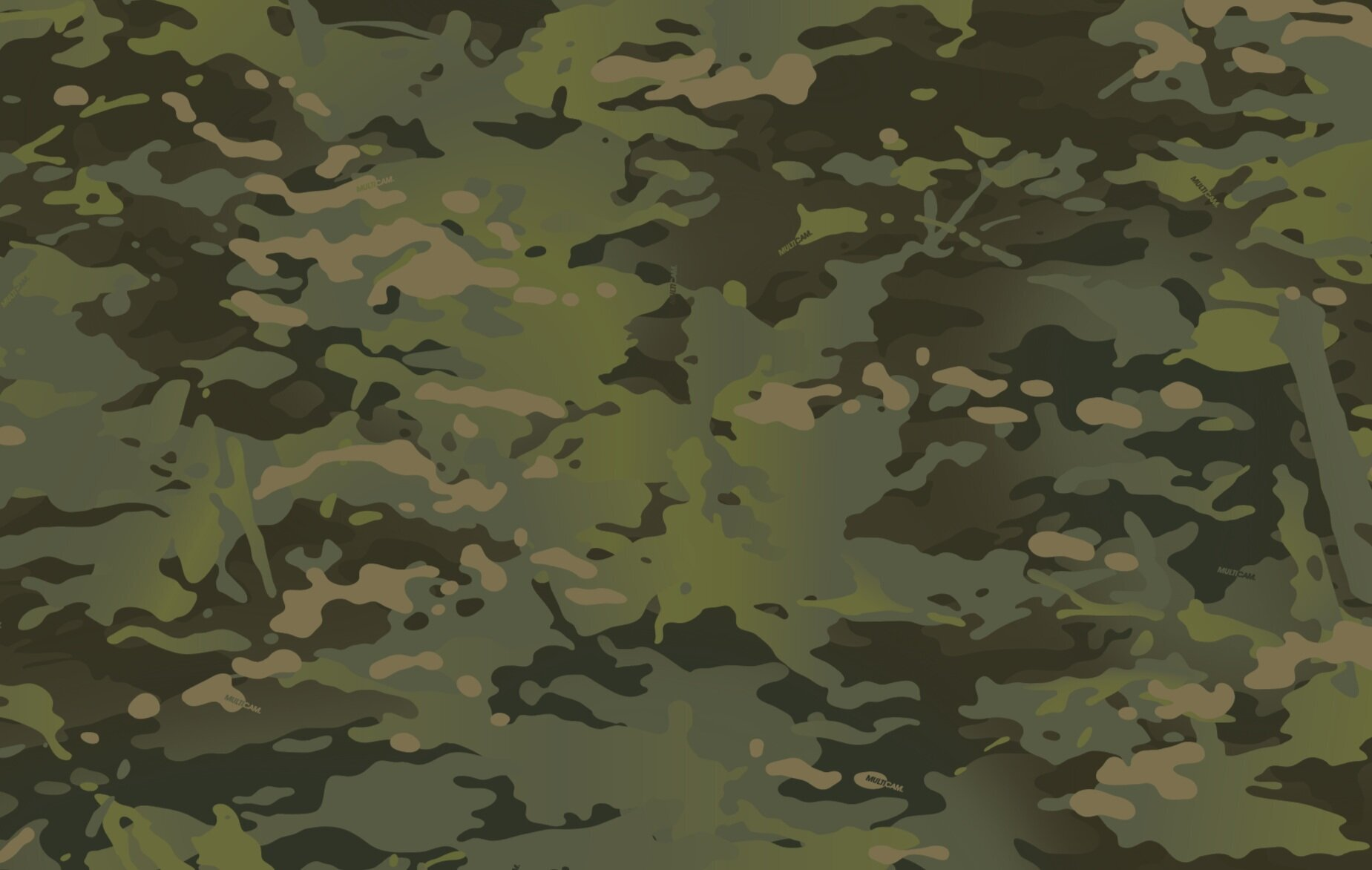
Tropic MultiCam

For users operating in dense jungle environments and areas that predominantly consist of lush vegetation that remains relatively unaffected by seasonal changes.

==== Alpine ====
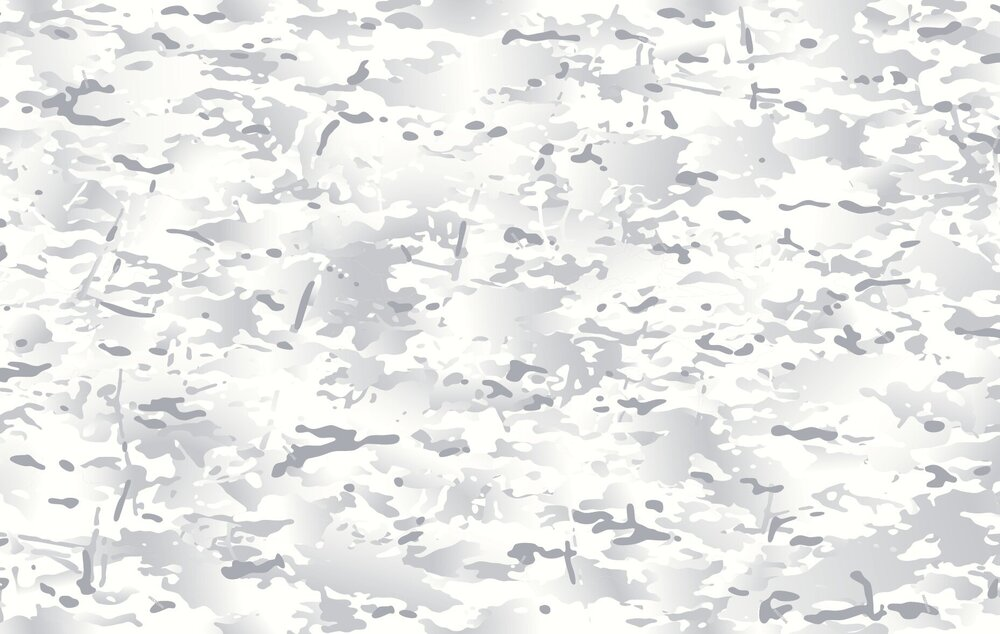
Alpine MultiCam

For users operating in snow-covered environments and intended to be used in every area of operation that receives significant snowfall.

==== Black ====
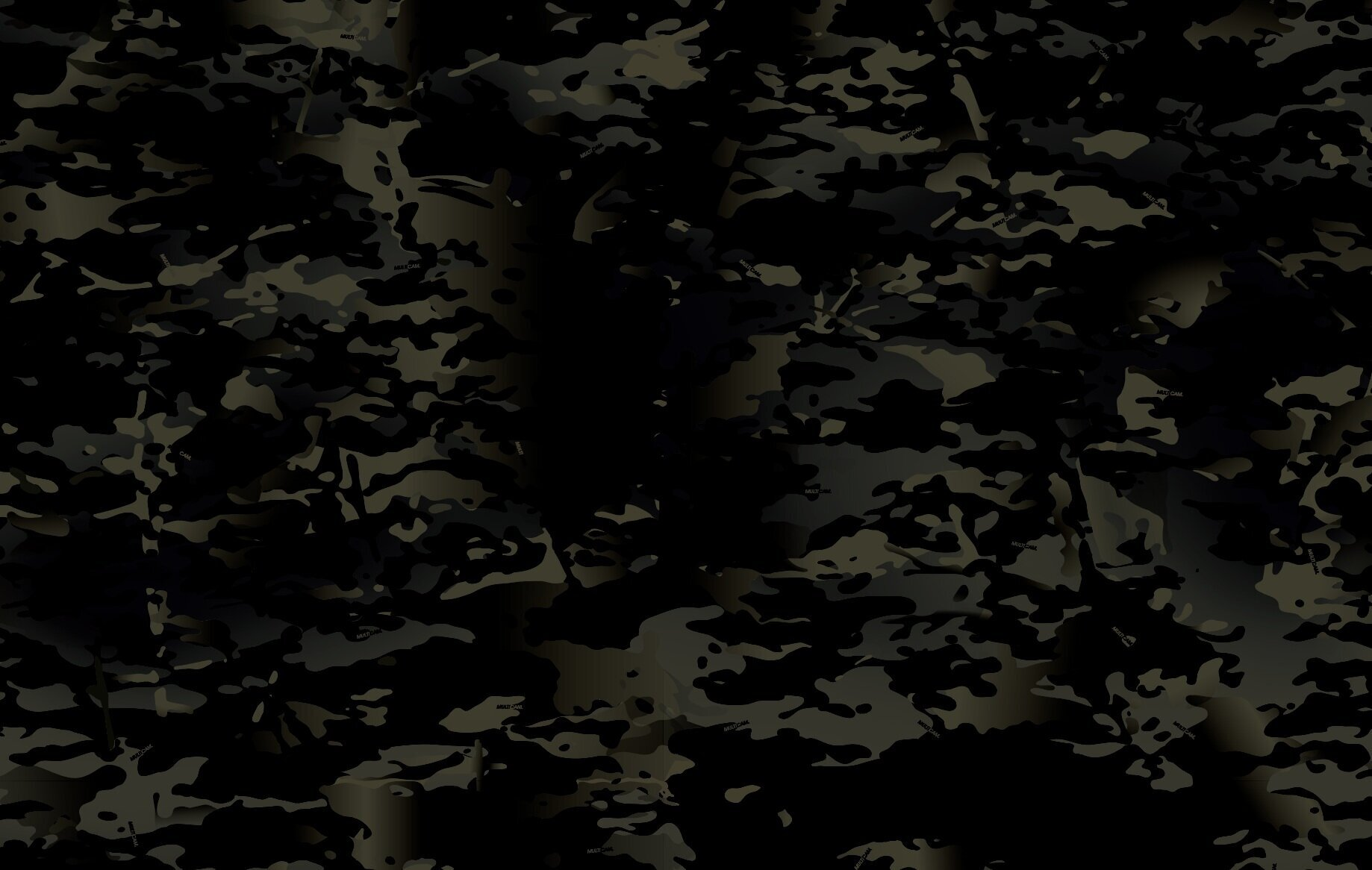
Black MultiCam

The black-patterned variant is intended primarily for police tactical units and other law-enforcement personnel operating in high-risk environments. Unlike camouflage patterns designed chiefly for concealment, its dark coloration is also intended to provide a distinctive and readily identifiable appearance during domestic tactical operations.

== Adoption ==
=== Australia ===
==== Army ====
On 19 November 2010, after trials by Australian special operations forces, the Australian Defence Force announced that MultiCam will be standard for all regular Australian Army personnel in Afghanistan. MultiCam, it is said, provided "troops with greater levels of concealment across the range of terrains in Afghanistan – urban, desert and green." Previously, depending upon the terrain, Australian troops had to transition between green and desert colored Australian Disruptive Pattern Camouflage Uniforms (DPCU or AUSCAM).

On 30 May 2011 the Defence Material Organisation announced that they had obtained licence to produce MultiCam in Australia for US$4.7 million and Crye would also design a new uniquely Australian pattern for another US$3.1 million.

The Australian Army decided to standardize MultiCam-patterned uniforms starting in October 2014 called the Australian Multicam Camouflage Uniform (AMCU). The Australian derivative retains colour and pattern elements of the previous DPCU pattern.

The AMCU is manufactured domestically by Australian Defence Apparel and Pacific Brands Workwear Group and comes in two variations, field and combat, using a tested Australian Multi-Camouflage Pattern that can operate in bush, desert, and jungle conditions. Previous DPCU Uniforms and Australian MultiCam Pattern Operational Combat Uniforms will be worn until all Army personnel have been issued with the AMCU.

==== Air Force ====
In 2014 the Royal Australian Air Force began fielding a new MultiCam-based uniform to replace the DPCU, called the General Purpose Uniform (GPU), using the blue-and-grey colours of the RAAF. The uniform is not intended to be used as camouflage in warlike operations or environments.

In June 2025 it was announced that the RAAF would transition to the Australian Multicam Camouflage Uniform by the end of the year as part of efforts to prepare the force for warfare in Australia's region. The GPU will continue to be authorised for wear on RAAF bases, but not on operations or exercises.

==== Navy ====
In 2015, the Royal Australian Navy began their own testing of a new MultiCam uniform with a blue colourway, calling it the Maritime Multicam Pattern Uniform (MMPU).

The new uniform and pattern were intended to replace the Navy's grey-and-green Disruptive Pattern Naval Uniform (DPNU) by 2017.

In 2019, the Navy announced that it was fielding a variant of the new AMCU including the design and cut of the uniform itself, and reverting to the grey-and-green colours of the DPNU.

=== United Kingdom ===
The colors of the MultiCam pattern were used in the development of the British armed forces Multi-Terrain Pattern (MTP).

British forces deployed in Afghanistan used MTP uniforms from March 2010 onwards, with these uniforms replacing all Disruptive Pattern Material (DPM) uniforms by 2013.

The colors used in Crye's MultiCam technology were determined to be the best performing, across the widest range of environments (by a significant margin) when compared with the two existing DPM designs in use at the time and was subsequently selected as the basis for the new MTP camouflage, combined with the existing DPM base pattern.

In June 2020, the Royal Marines announced the adoption of a new uniform made by Crye which uses the original MultiCam pattern instead of MTP, though the compatibility of the two designs means that items of load carrying equipment produced in MTP continue to be on issue; prior to this, usage of original MultiCam as an issued uniform (as opposed to items privately purchased by individual personnel) was limited to United Kingdom Special Forces units.

=== United States ===
MultiCam is currently in use by the U.S. Special Operations Command, and some private military contractors. Several members of the U.S. Army's Charlie Company, 2nd Battalion, 12th Infantry Regiment were also seen wearing MultiCam when followed by ABC News.

In 2010, U.S. soldiers deployed to Afghanistan were issued MultiCam versions of the Army Combat Uniform, as the existing Universal Camouflage Pattern (UCP) was found to be inadequate for the terrain, under the designation Operation Enduring Freedom Camouflage Pattern (OEF-CP or OCP).

The U.S. Army discontinued the use of UCP in October 2019.

In May 2014, the Army selected a pattern similar to MultiCam called Scorpion W2 to replace UCP, naming it the Operational Camouflage Pattern (OCP). The original Scorpion pattern was jointly developed by Crye Precision and the Army for the Objective Force Warrior program in 2002, and Crye made small adjustments for trademark purposes to create MultiCam. Because Scorpion is similar to MultiCam, the same color Velcro, buttons, and zippers can be reused. OCP resembles MultiCam with muted greens, light beige, and dark brown colors, but uses fewer beige and brown patches and no vertical twig and branch elements.

On 31 July 2014, the Army formally announced that OCP would begin being issued in uniforms in summer 2015. Soldiers were allowed to continue wearing uniforms and field equipment patterned in MultiCam until they could acquire OCP, which was allowed until the MultiCam uniforms' wear-out date on 1 October 2018.

The U.S. Air Force also subsequently adopted OCP uniforms, starting 2018 with full phase-on April 1, 2021, replacing the previous Airman Battle Uniform.

Some local, state and federal law enforcement agencies also make use of the pattern, including the Drug Enforcement Administration's Foreign-deployed Advisory and Support Teams (FAST) teams operating in Afghanistan as well as the U.S. Immigration and Customs Enforcement's Special Reaction Team, the Spokane, Washington Police Department, and the Oregon State Police SWAT team.

=== Ukraine ===
The first use of MultiCam in Ukraine was done by the "Ukrainian Volunteer Battalions": militias and paramilitary groups formed to fight separatists, which were largely self-funded and bought their own equipment.

Ukraine first adopted MultiCam officially for their special forces units as part of a larger NATO training and modernization program, together with a new digital camo for regular units. However, some regular Ukrainian Armed Forces and the National Guard of Ukraine units have been issued MultiCam uniforms as well.

Due to the widespread use of MultiCam in the war, Ukrainian soldiers have resorted to using tape for identification purposes.

Territorial Defense Forces volunteers, are sometimes issued or buy their own MultiCam uniforms. Members of the special police unit Rapid Operational Response Unit (KORD) of the National Police of Ukraine also use MultiCam.

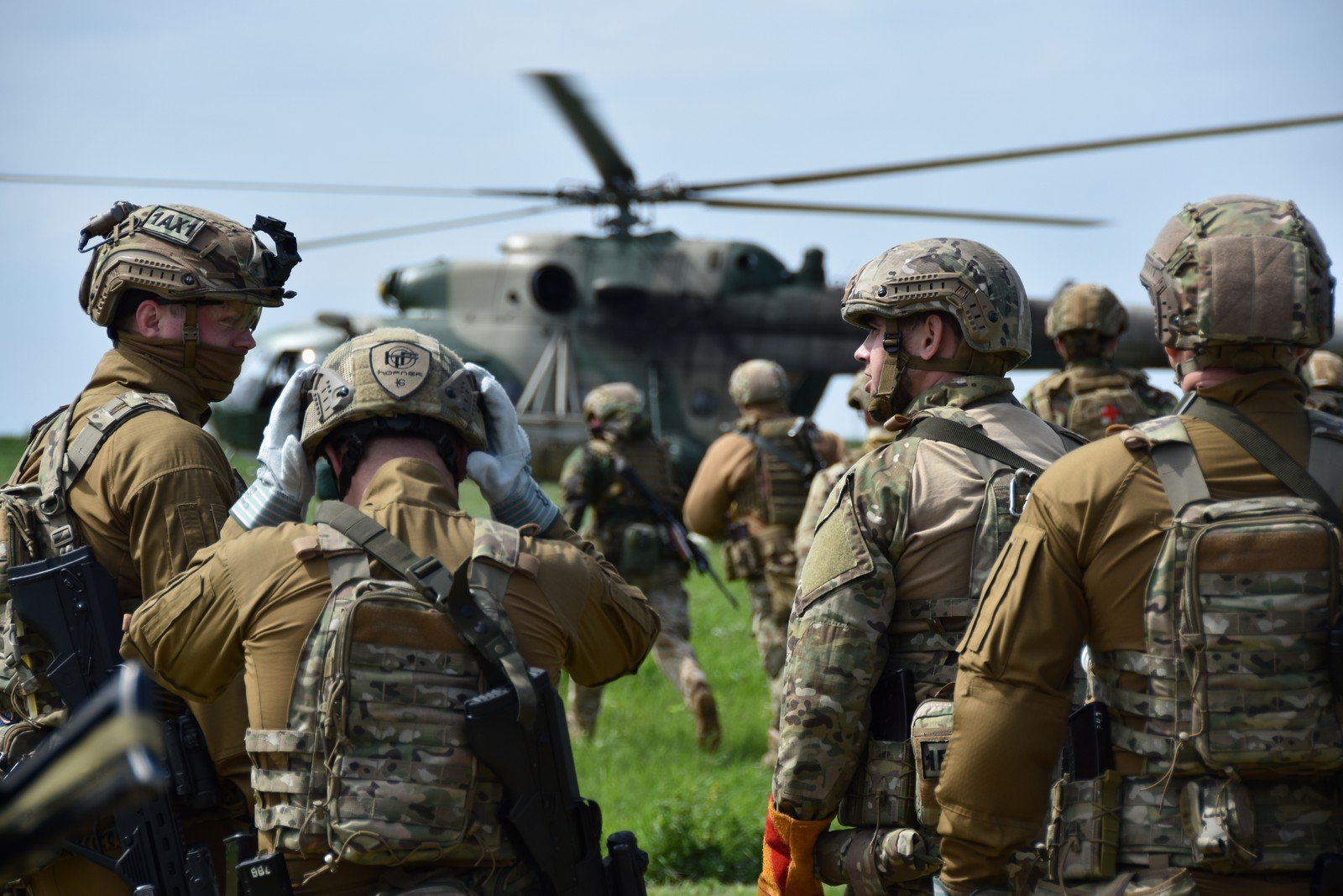
Operators of the SSO wearing MultiCam

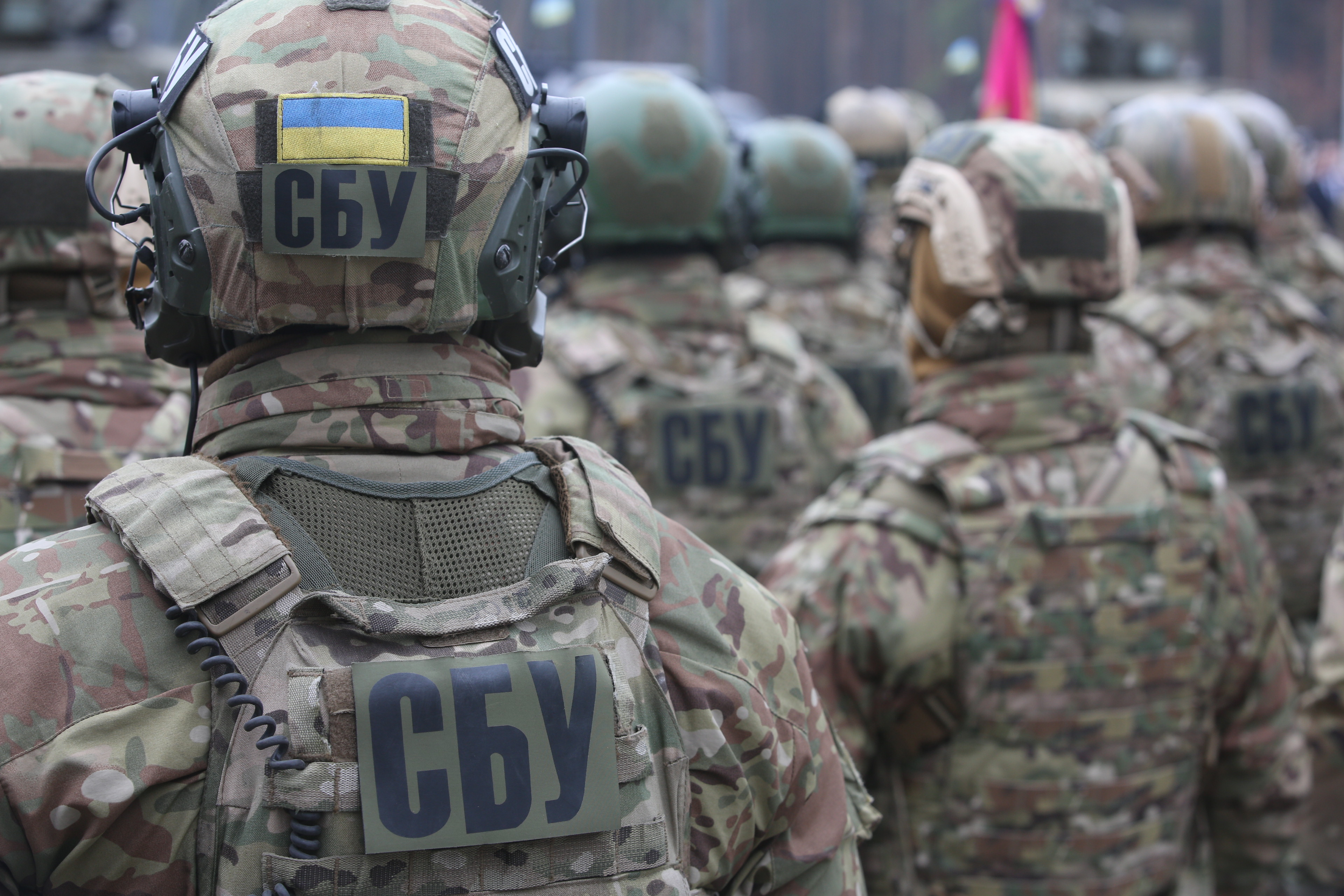
Operators of the SBU Alpha Group wearing MultiCam

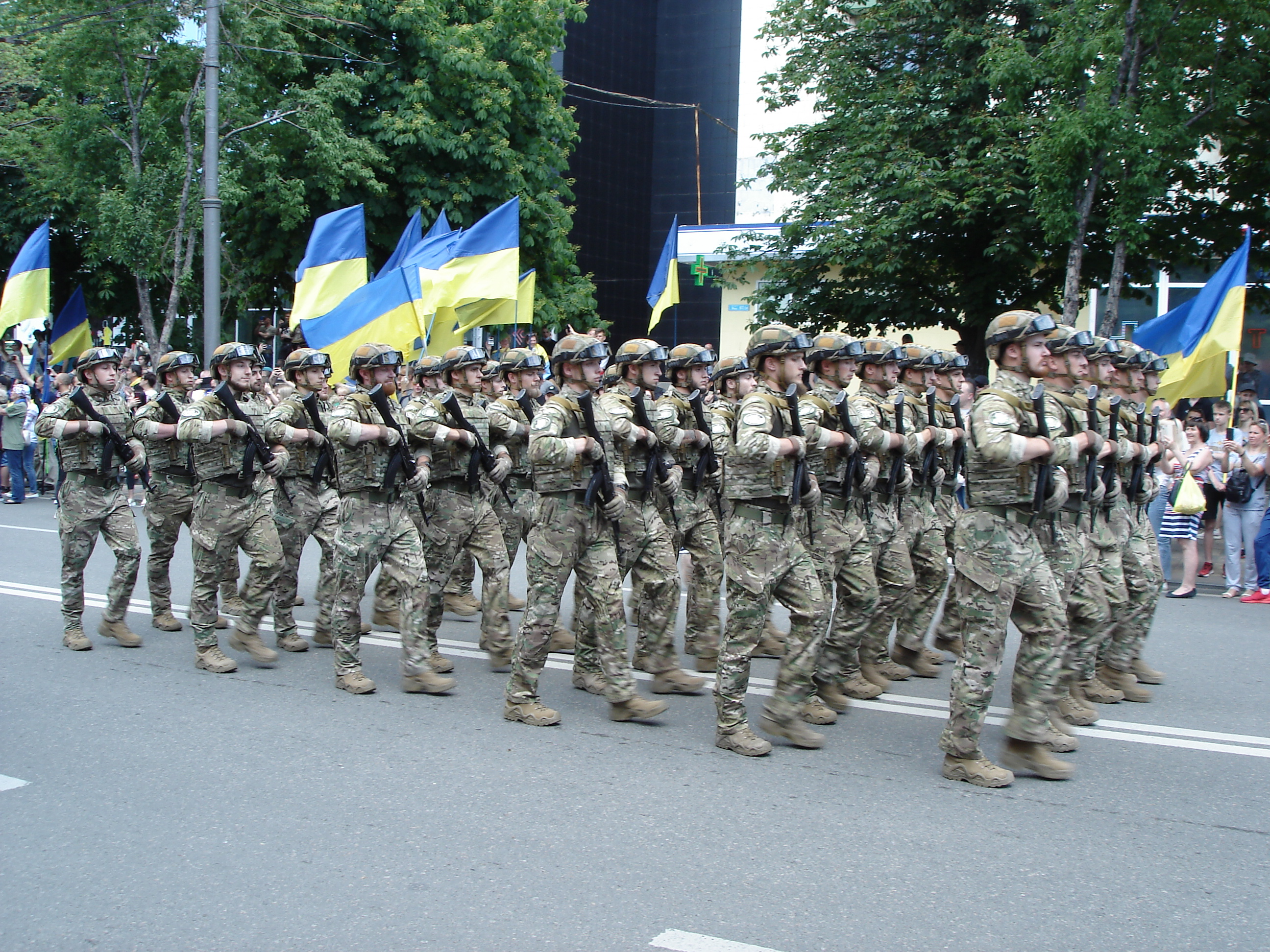
Soldiers of the National Guard of Ukraine wearing MultiCam in a military parade

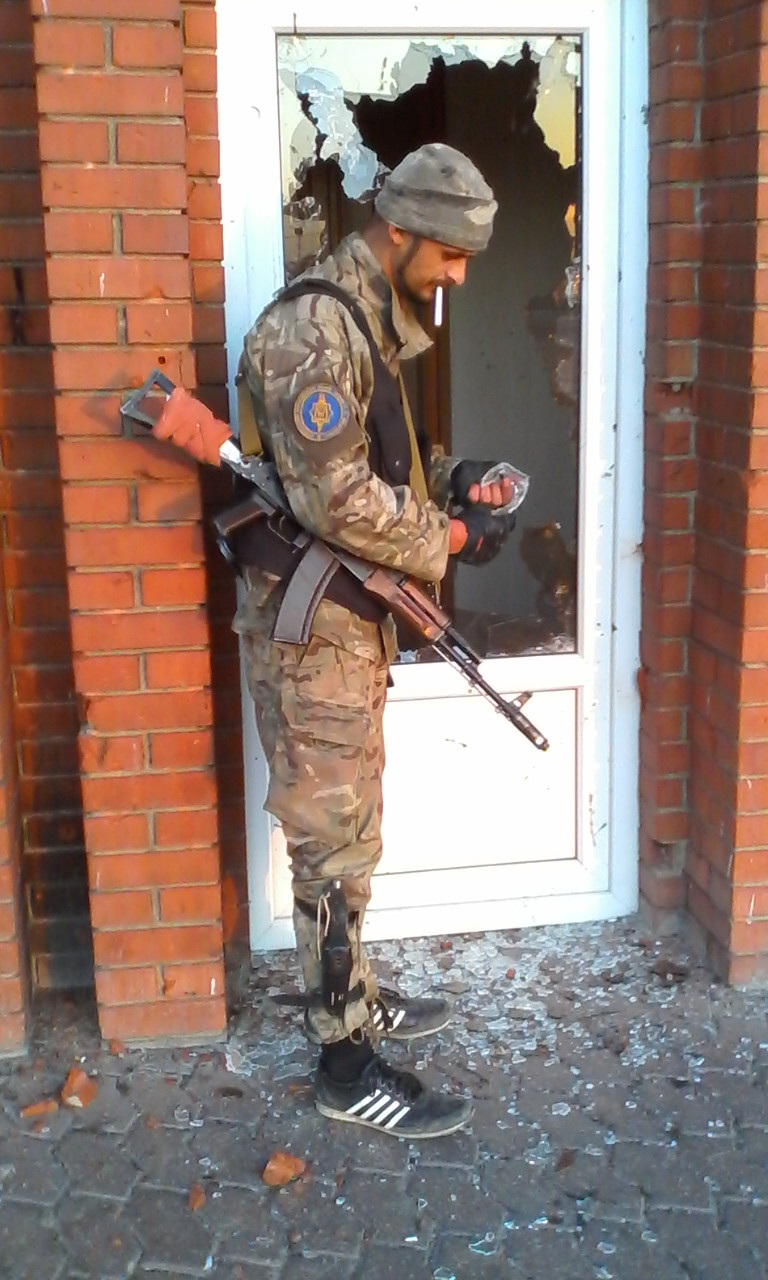
Soldier of a "Volunteer Battalion" militia in 2014 during the war in Donbas

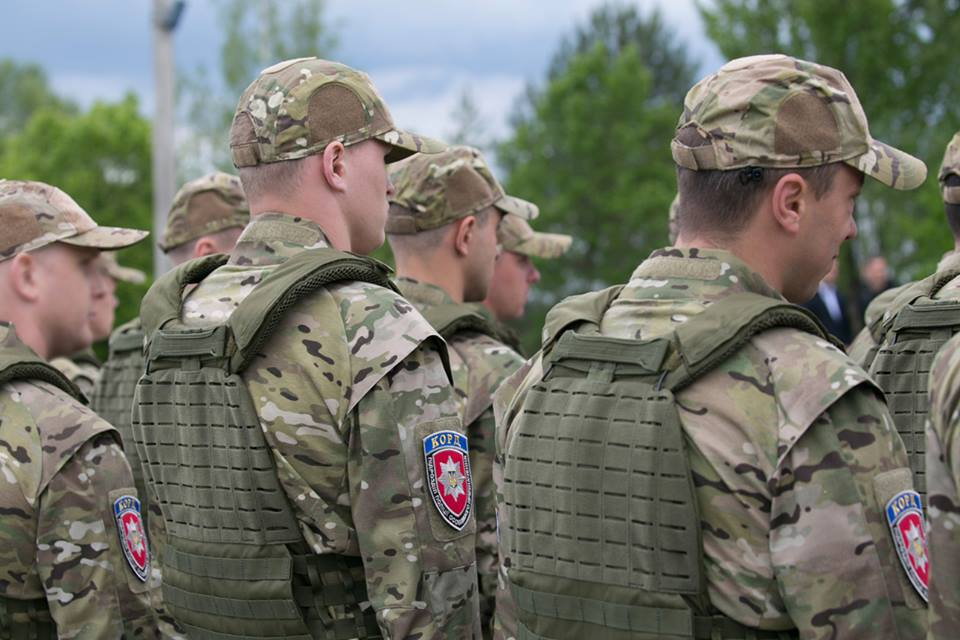
Members of KORD wearing MultiCam

== Variants ==
=== Australia ===
The fabric for the AMCU, the MMPU, and the GPU are produced in Australia by Bruck Textiles Pty Ltd.

=== Canada ===
In 2021, a CADPAT variant similar to the MultiCam pattern, called "multi-terrain pattern" or simply "MT," was announced as the replacement the TW and AR patterns.

The rollout began in February 2024 for high-readiness units first; and scheduled to fully replace all older variant of CADPAT by 2026.

=== China ===
An "all-terrain" MultiCam-influenced pattern camouflage that debuted during the 2015 Victory Day Parade.

It was intended to replace the Type 07 uniform; ultimately it was not adopted by the PLA.

=== France ===
A French-developed camouflage inspired by MultiCam, called Bariolage Multi-Environnement (BME), is due to become the standard camouflage pattern of the French Armed Forces from 2024 onwards.

=== Georgia ===
A domestic variant of MultiCam is in use with the Georgian Defense Forces as standard issue for the military as well as special units of the MIA and State Security.

The pattern was adopted initially in 2009, replacing the DWC and MARPAT and since has been produced in a slightly altered version that fits better to the local environment.

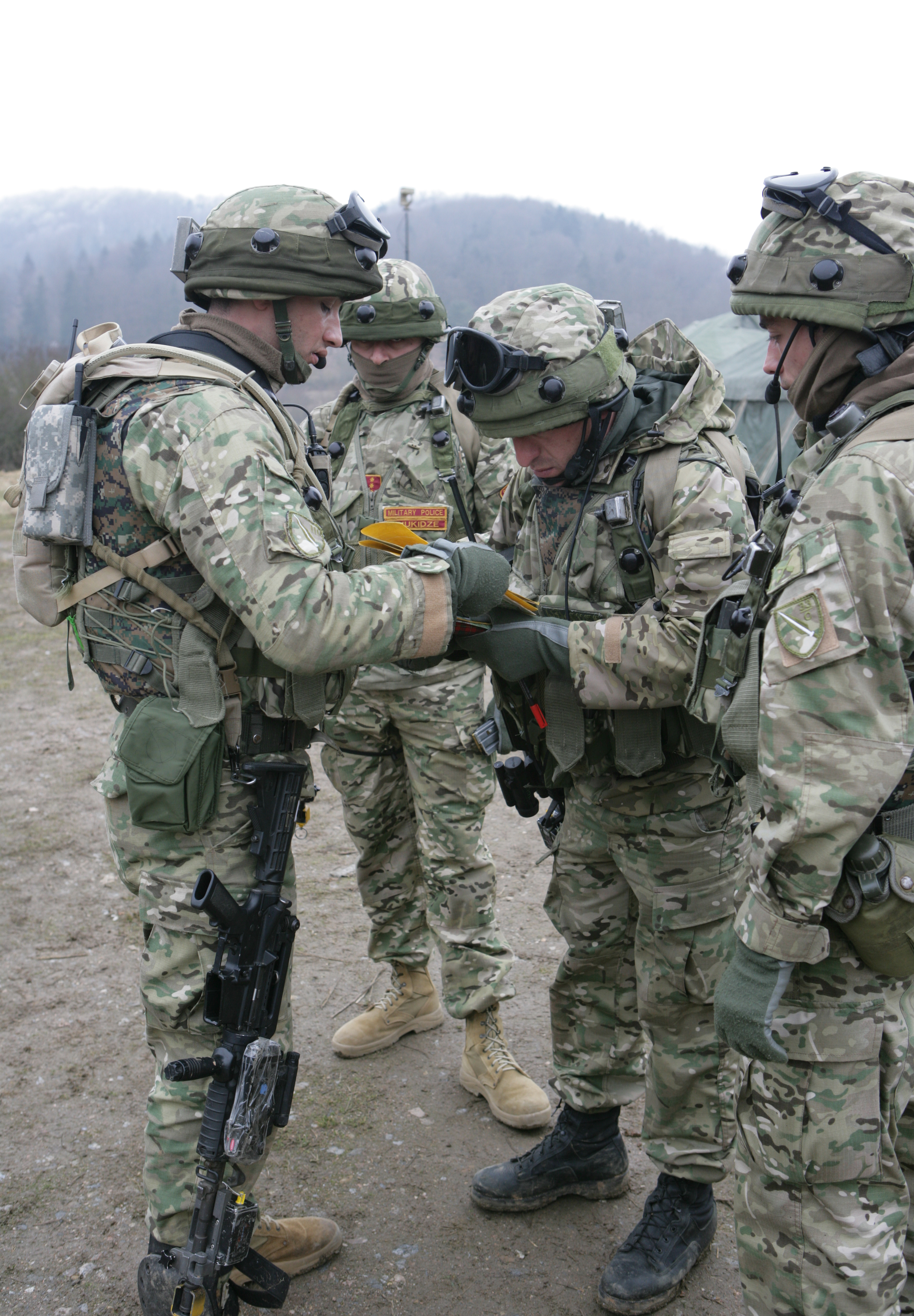
Infantrymen of the Georgian 33rd LIB during a mission readiness exercise

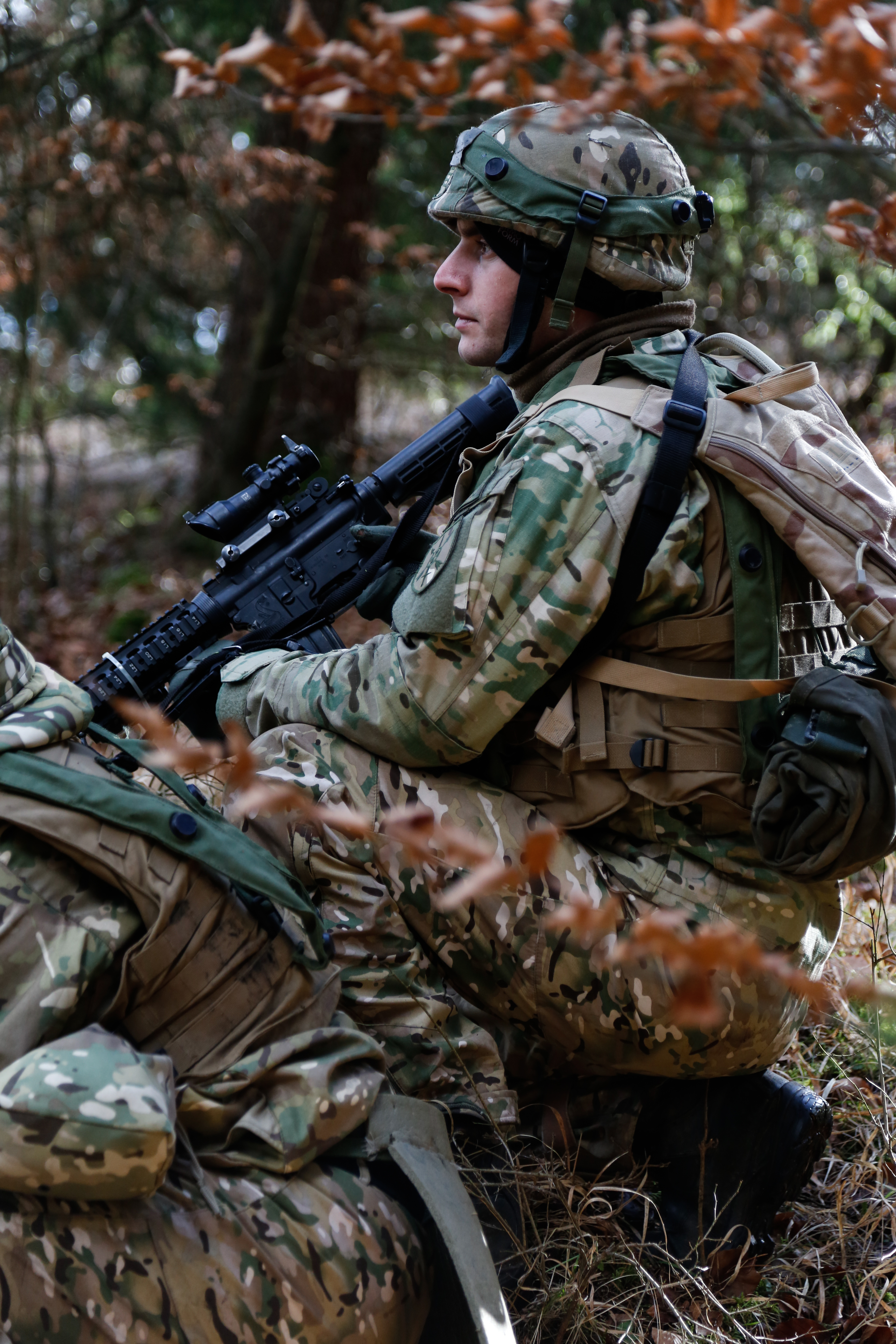
A Georgian ranger during mission rehearsal for Afghanistan deployment

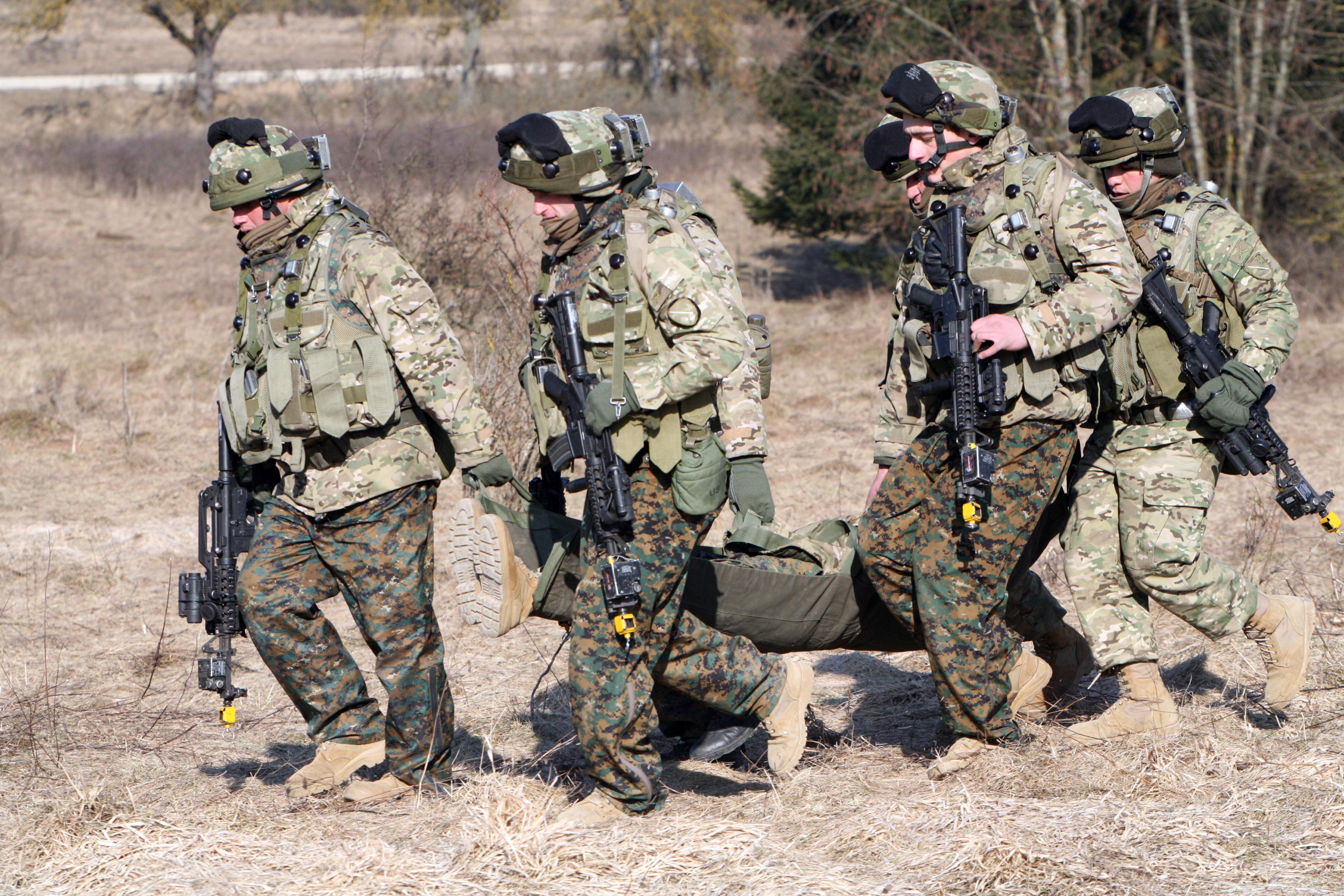
Georgian troops wearing a mix of MultiCam and MARPAT

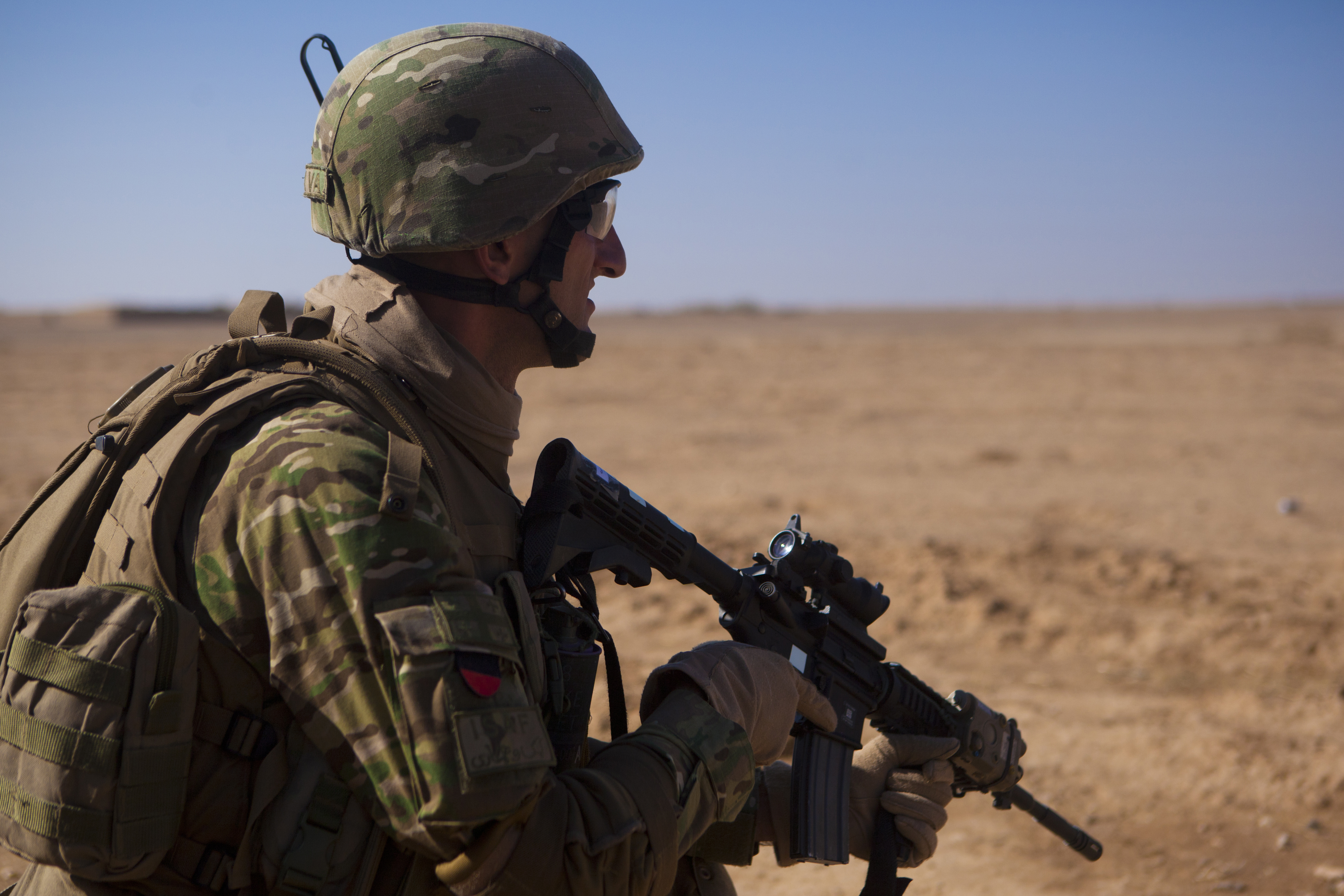
A Georgian officer of the Batumi Separate Light Infantry Battalion in Afghanistan

=== Hungary ===
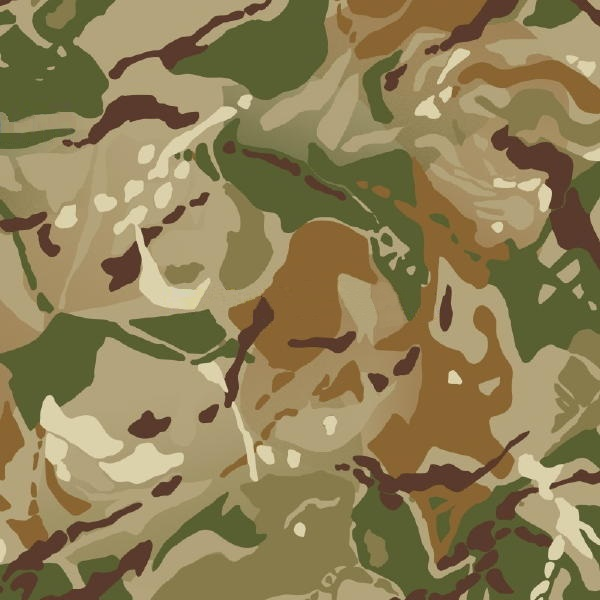
The Hungarian Army's 2015M pattern

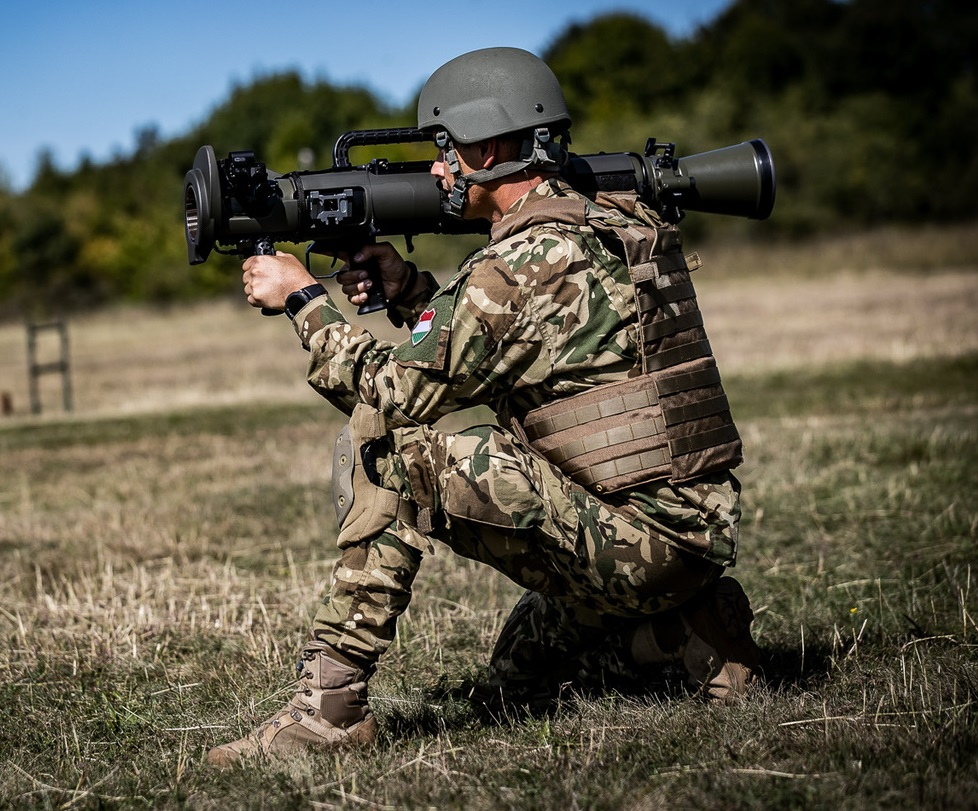
Hungarian soldier wearing 2015M pattern uniform

=== Indonesia ===
On 2 March 2022, the Army unveiled their field uniform with a new camo pattern known as "Army Camo Pattern" (Indonesian: Loreng Angkatan Darat) or "Army Camo" (Indonesian: Loreng TNI AD, officially as the "PDL (Field Service Uniform) Typical of the Army" (Indonesian: PDL (Pakaian Dinas Lapangan) Khas Matra Darat). This camo is a variant of Multicam based on US Army OCP with local DPM color palette. A Desert/Arid variant intended to replace the older local Desert DPM variant is also present. Some Kopassus unit are also present with tropical and black variant.

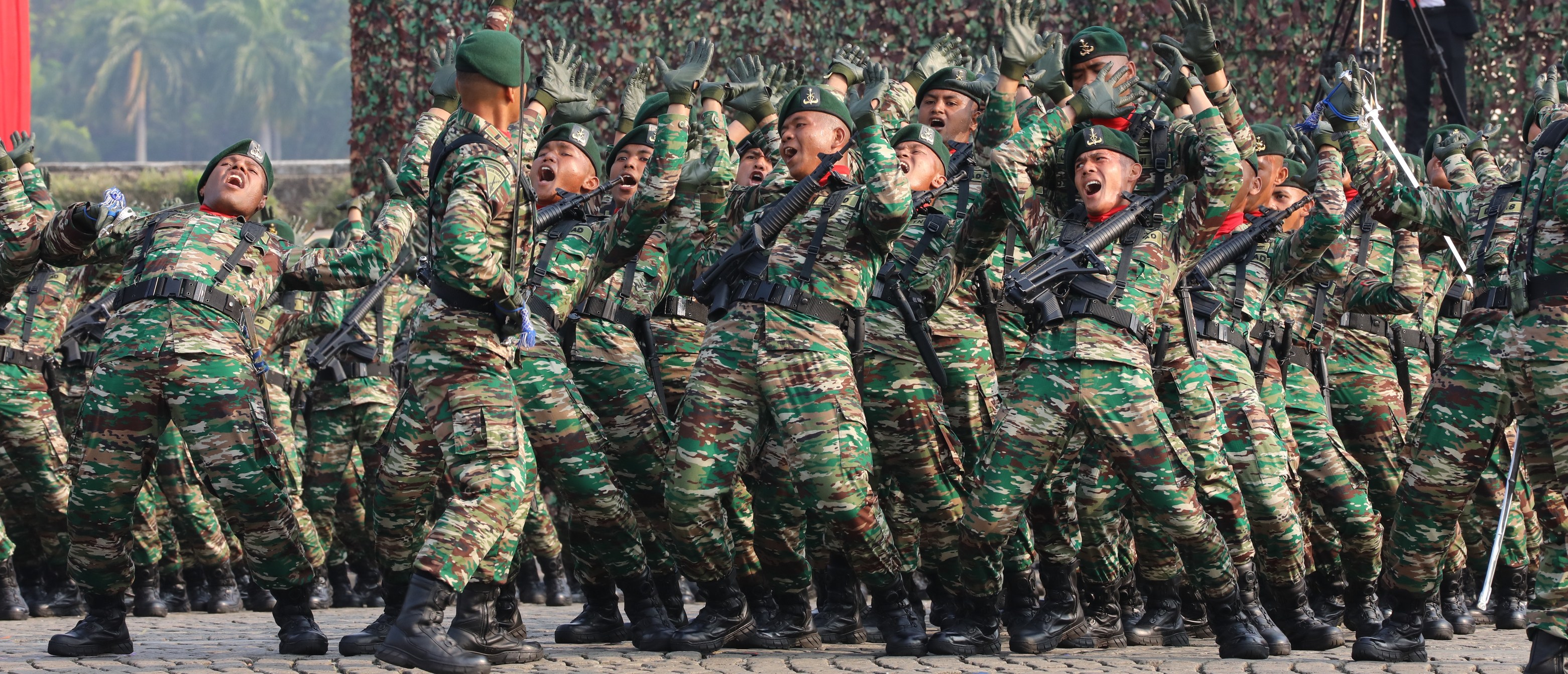
Indonesian Army infantry 1st Mechanized Infantry Brigade with the 'PDL Khas Matra Darat' camo

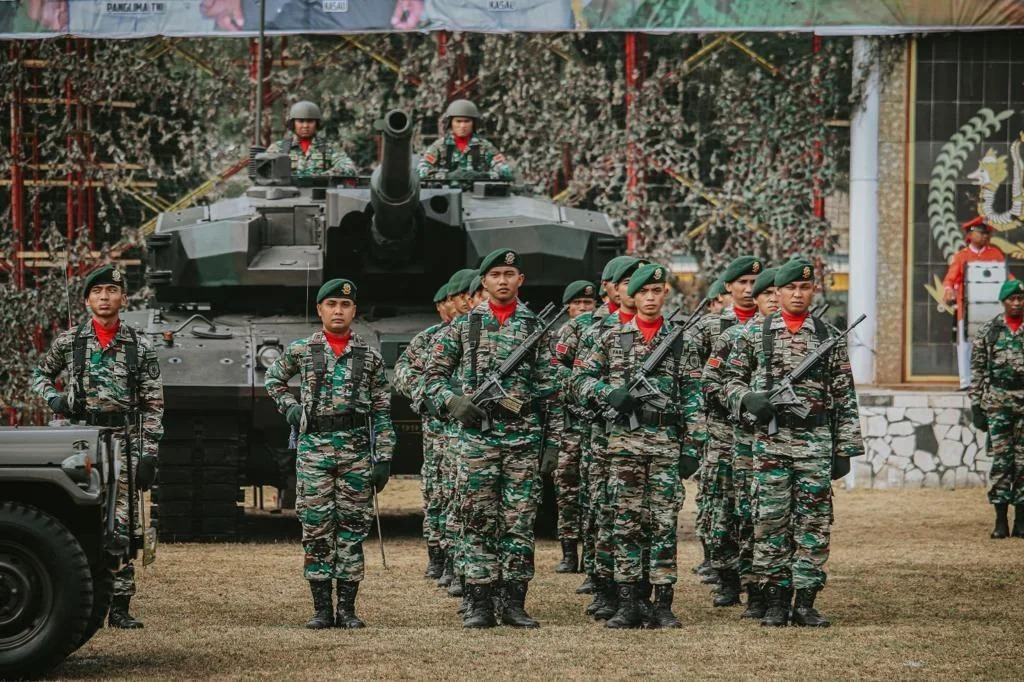
Indonesian Army Kostrad 2nd Infantry Division with the Indonesian MultiCam camo pattern

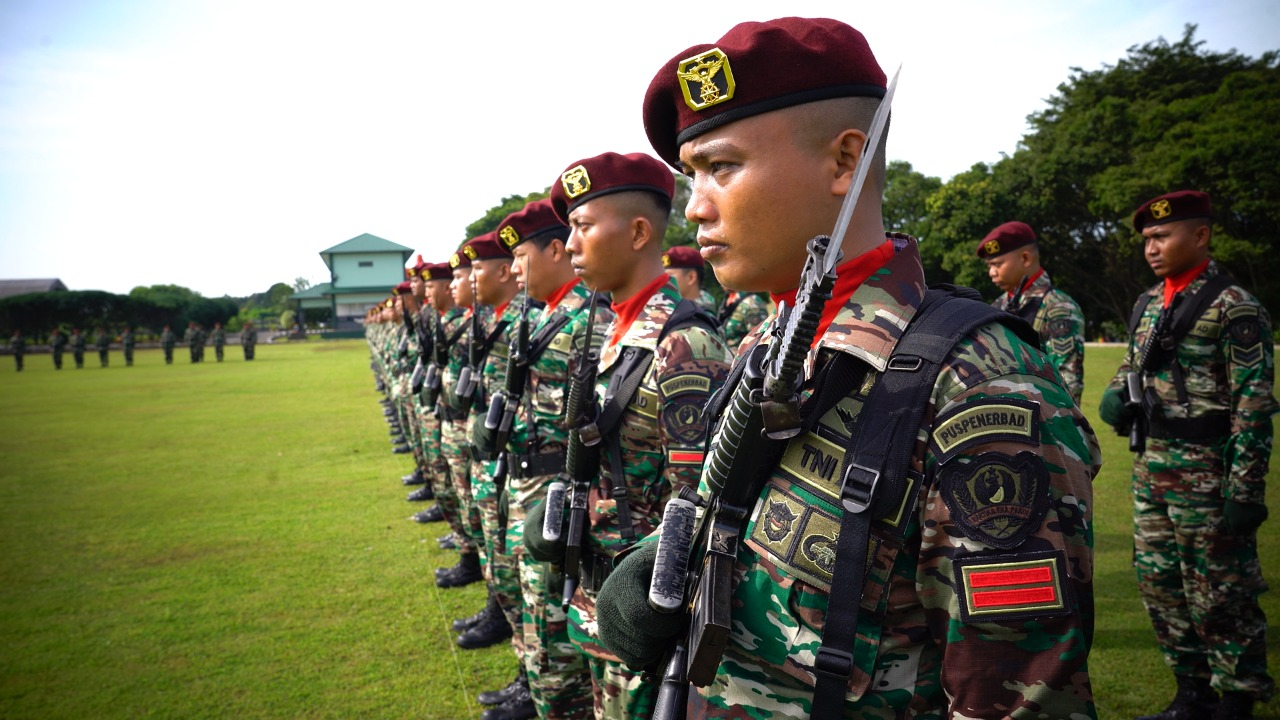
Soldiers of the Army Aviation Center wearing the Indonesian MultiCam

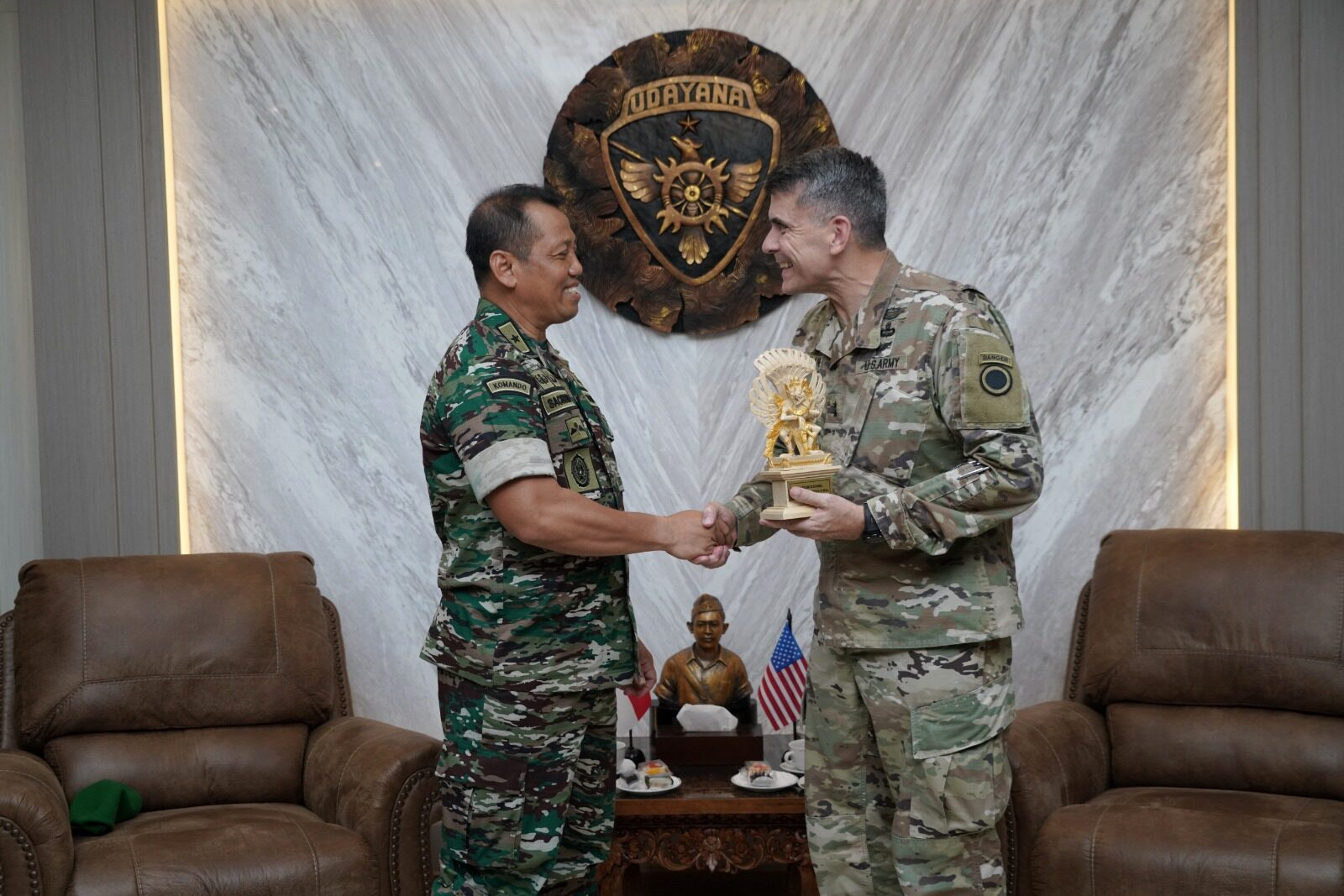
Indonesian MultiCam compared to the US Army OCP

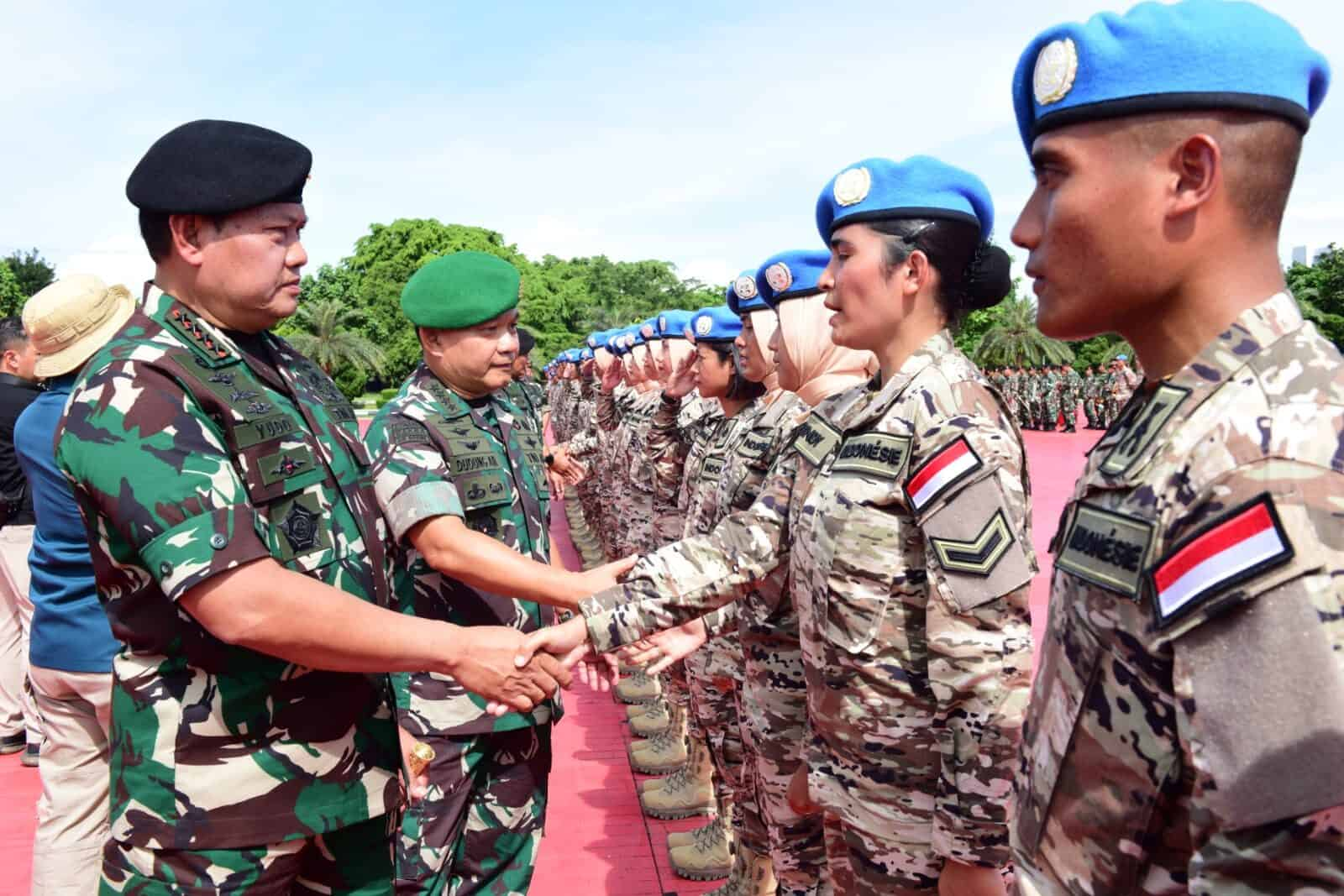
Garuda Contingent for MONUSCO wearing the Desert Camo/Loreng Gurun variant of the Indonesian MultiCam

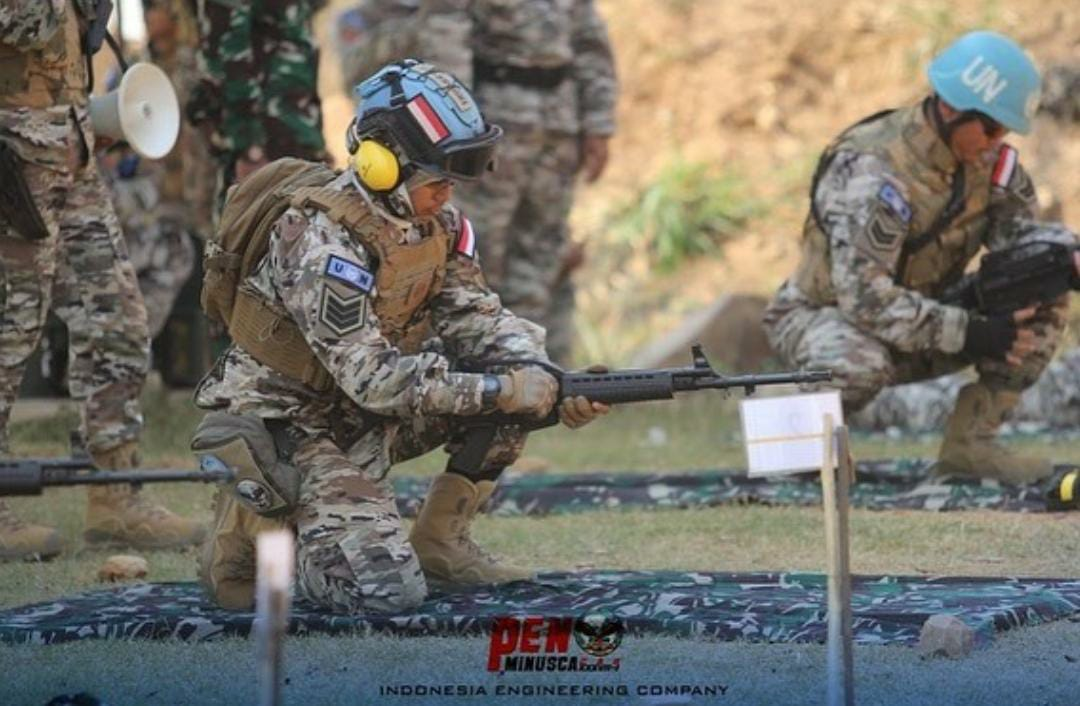
Indonesian Army Engineering Company for MINUSCA with the desert Indocam / Loreng Gurun

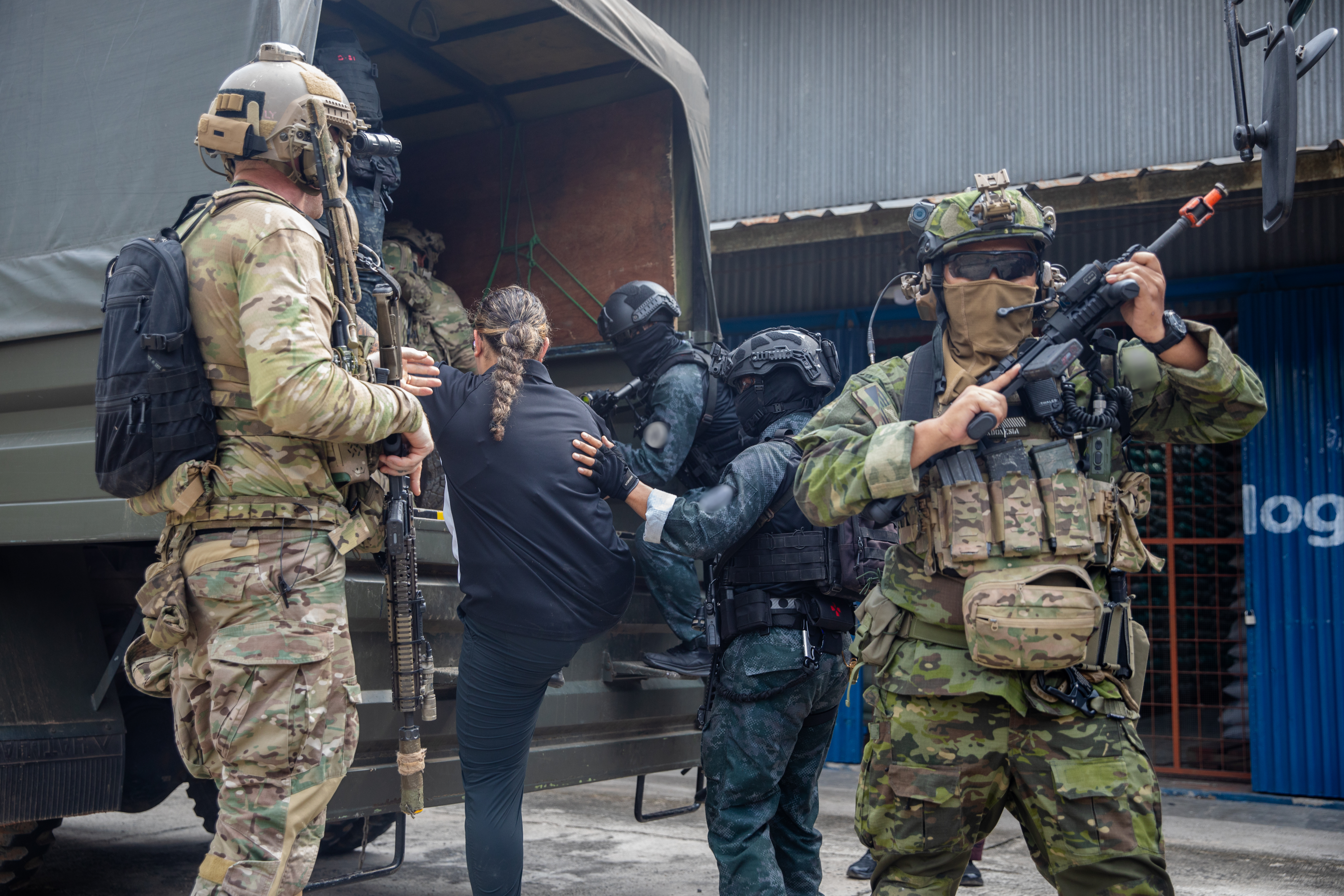
MultiCam field uniform of U.S. Air Force Special Tactics compared to the black and tropical variant of Multicam of Indonesian Army Special Operation Forces.

=== Ireland ===
An Irish MultiCam variant known as Irish Transitional Multi-Cam Pattern (ITMCP) is being developed by the Irish military to replace in their DPM camouflage uniforms with the ITCMP pattern designed by Crye Precision. The ITMCP will be part of the upcoming DF Combat Clothing System, which would cost €40 million.

=== Montenegro ===
Montenegrin MultiCam versions are made by YDS Textiles with a Montenegrin motif in the camo print.

=== Netherlands ===
Dutch-made MultiCam camos are made by NFM Group.

=== New Zealand ===
The New Zealand Defence Force announced in late 2019 that it would be replacing its local Multi Terrain Pattern camouflage (NZMTP), in use since 2014, with a variant of British Multi-Terrain Pattern. The rollout began in 2020. Prior to this, the New Zealand Special Air Service in Afghanistan wore uniforms in Crye Precision MultiCam.

=== North Korea ===
First seen during a parade in October 2020 wearing supposed Multicam clones by the Korean's People Army.

=== Poland ===
A modified version of MultiCam has been adopted by the some of Polish Special Forces where it is named "Suez".

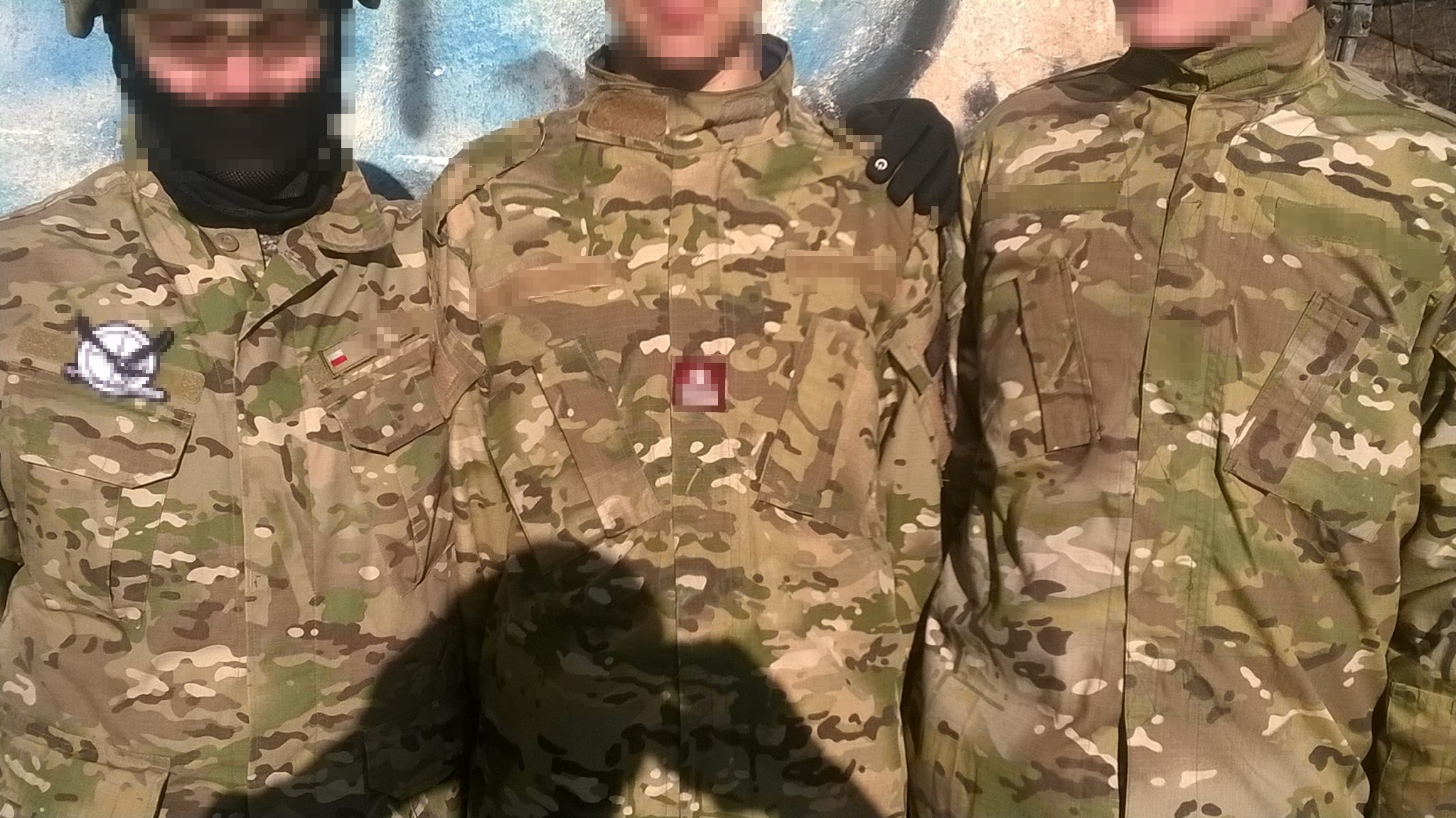
From left: Suez, MultiCam, OCP

=== Portugal ===
As part of the Soldiers Combat Systems (Portuguese: Sistemas de Combate do Soldado) project, in 2018, the Portuguese Army started to experiment a new individual equipment system for the dismounted soldiers, which includes a new camouflaged MultiCam-style uniform. It was developed in cooperation with the CINAMIL (Research Center for Development and Innovation of the Military Academy).

In 2019, the MultiCam-style camouflaged was officially adopted as the "multi-terrain" (Portuguese: Multiterreno), becoming the standard field uniform camouflage of the Portuguese Army, gradually replacing the Disruptive Pattern Material pattern.

This new uniform was tested in the field by units deployed to the Central African Republic, Afghanistan and Iraq.

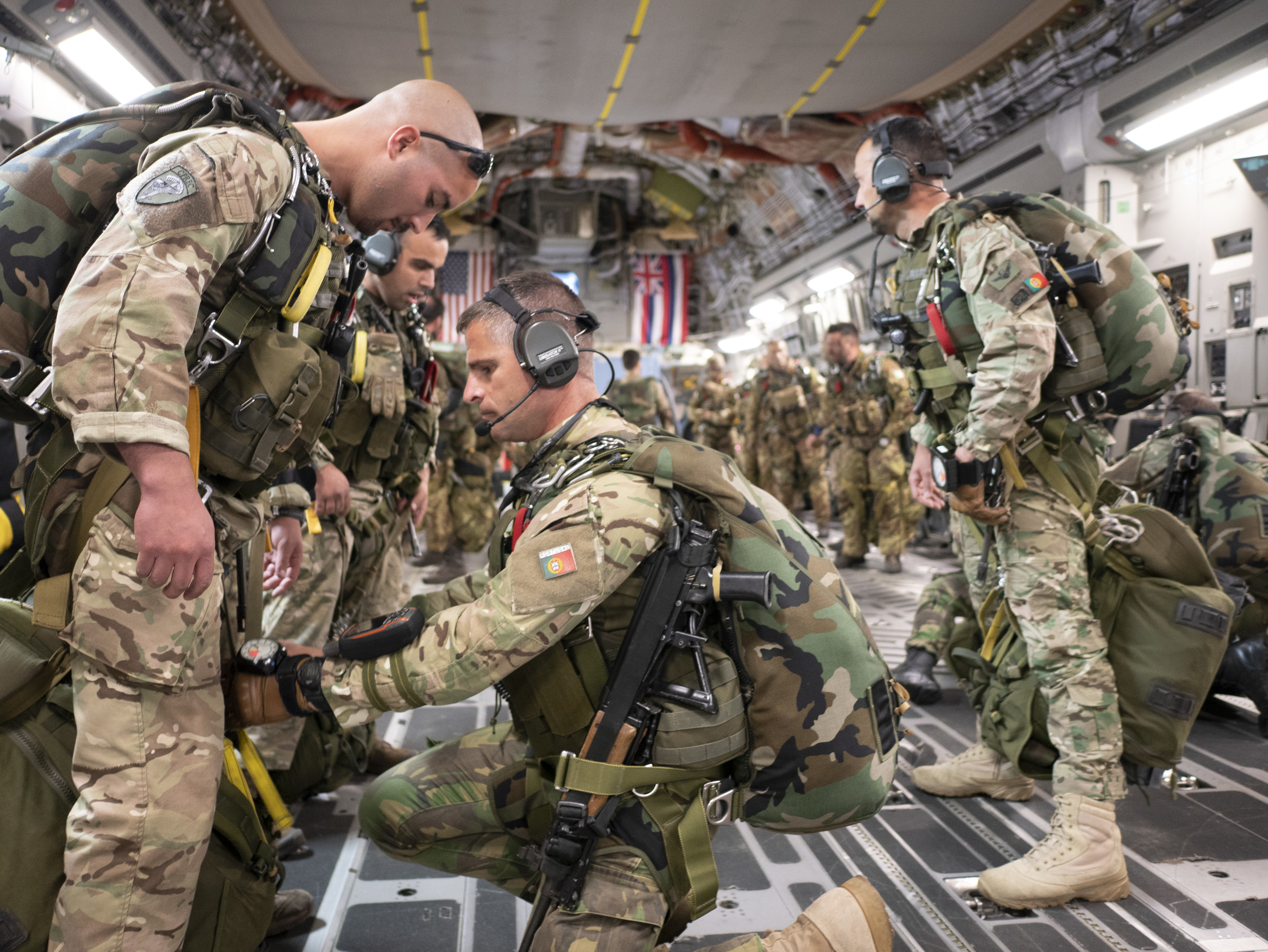
Portuguese paratroopers on board an aircraft

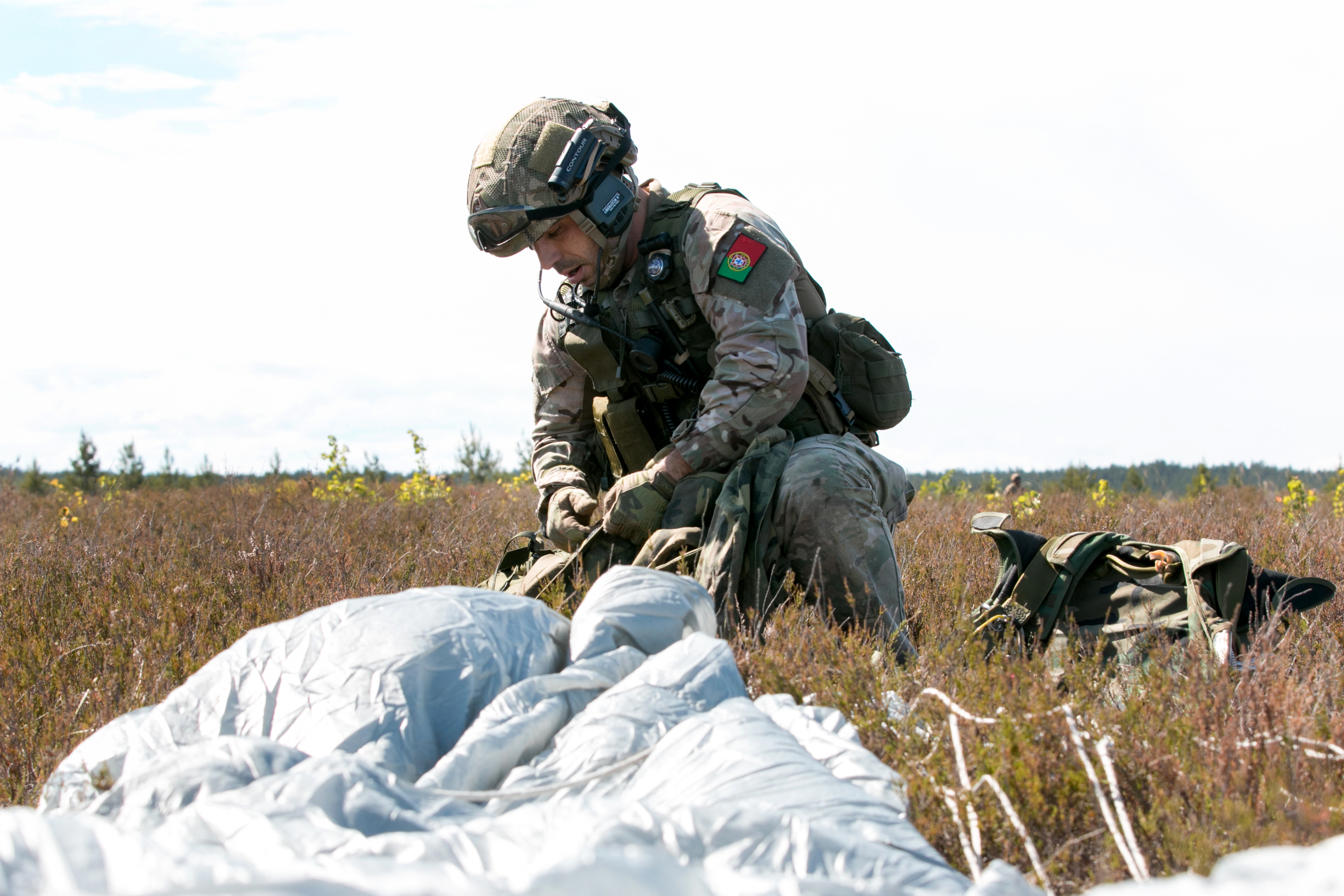
A freshly-landed Portuguese paratrooper

=== Romania ===
In October 2016, a new camouflage meant to replace the old Disruptive Pattern Material was presented by the Romanian Armed Forces. The pattern has a mosaic design and resembles MultiCam. The new camouflage was introduced in 2017. The five-color M2017 camouflage has distinct versions for the Army, Navy, and Air Force.

Regular MultiCam is also used by the Special Forces. These uniforms are made by UF Pro.

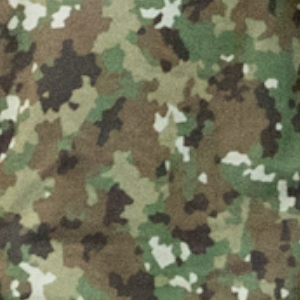
M2017 camouflage pattern

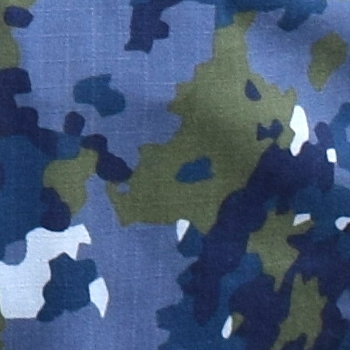
Air Force pattern

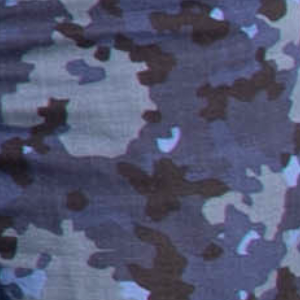
Navy pattern

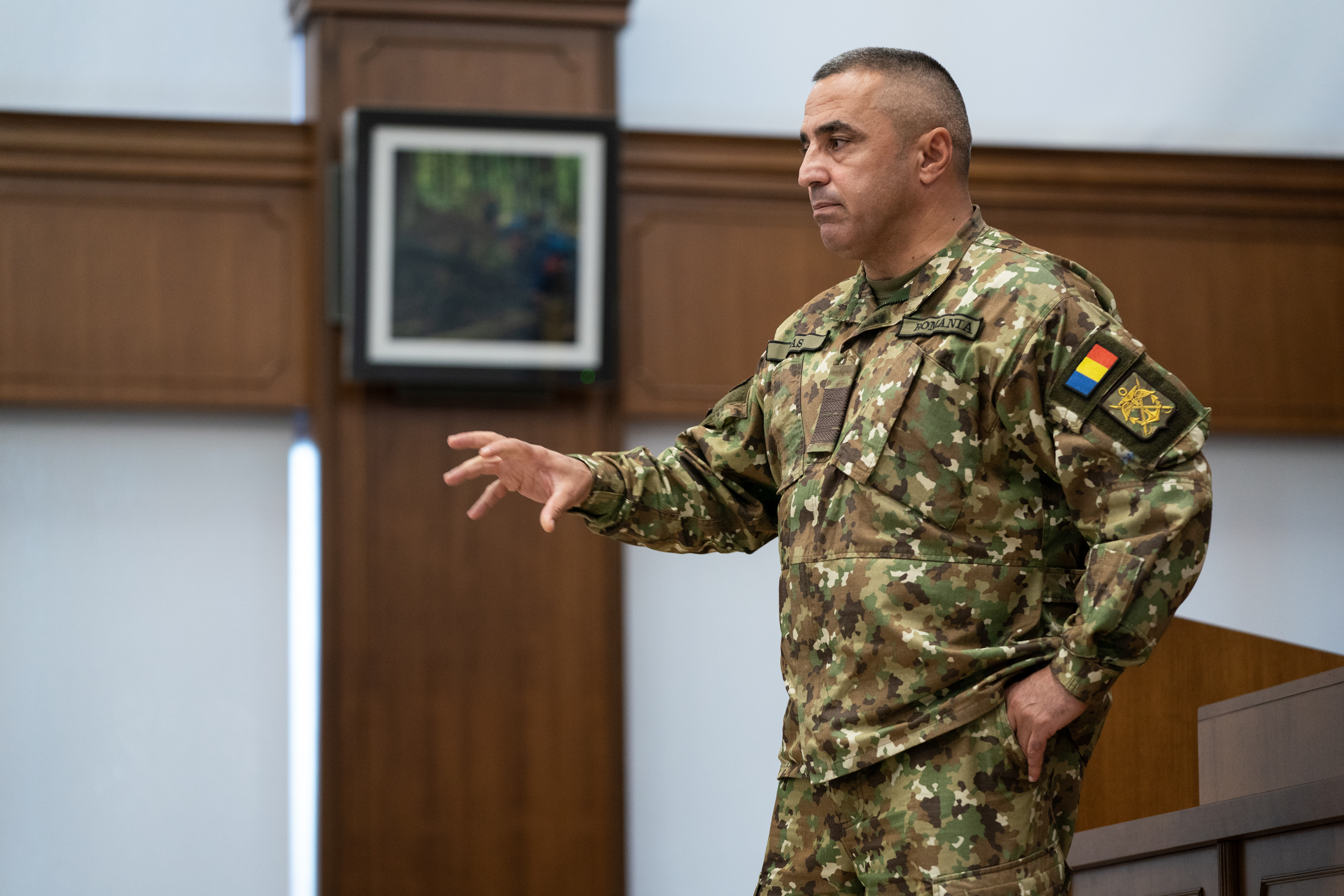
Army Sgt. Maj. Florea Sas wearing an M2017 camouflage uniform

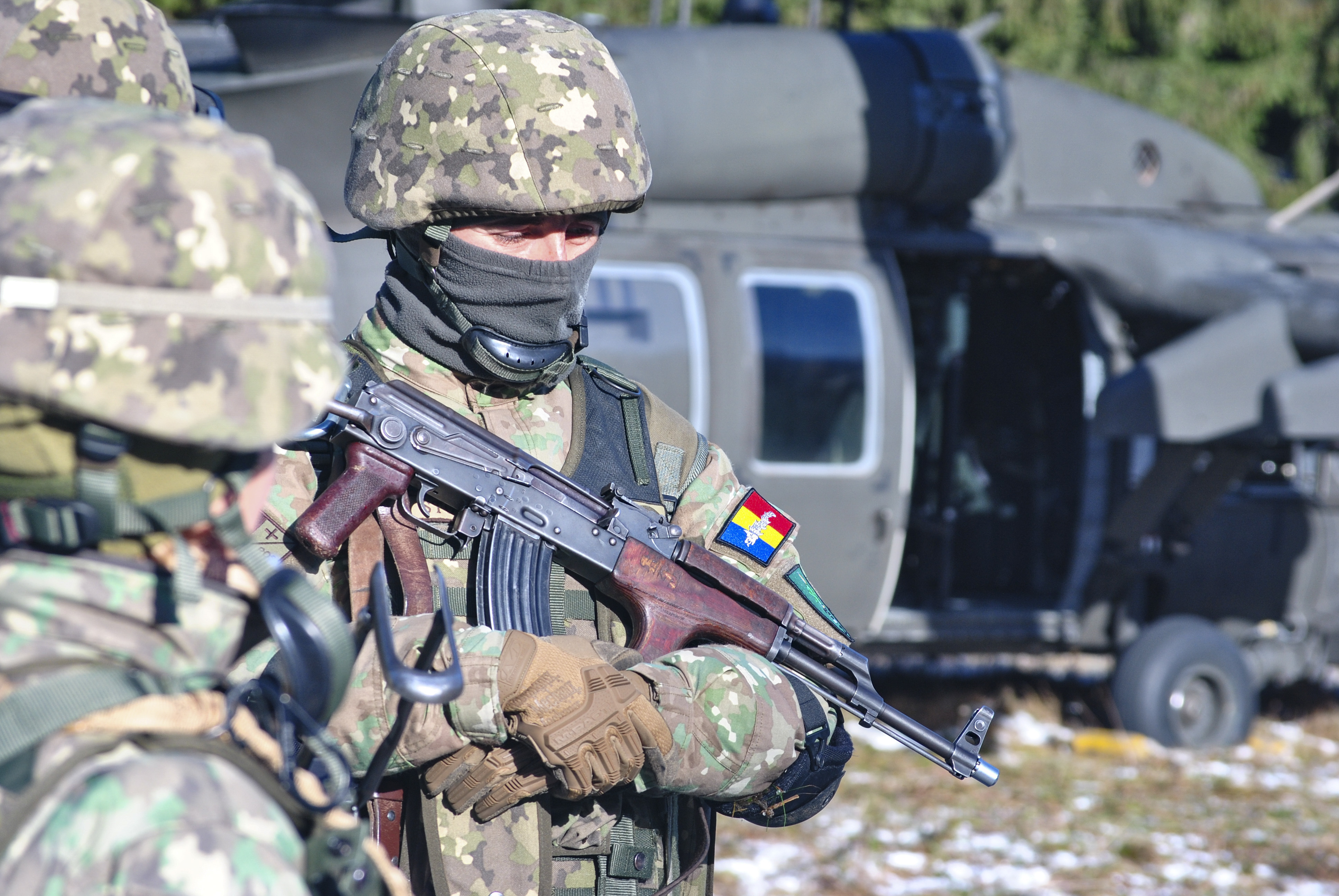
Vânători de munte soldiers

=== Russia ===
It is reported that Russia makes their own MultiCam camos. It was adopted in the 2010s mostly by spetsnaz units such as the SSO and FSB Alpha Group.

In 2023, Russia has adopted their local Multicam clone as a standard camouflage of its new Army field uniform kit, VKPO 2.0, VKPO 3.0 and VKPO 4.0.

Due to the widespread use of MultiCam in the war, Russian soldiers have resorted to using tape for identification purposes.

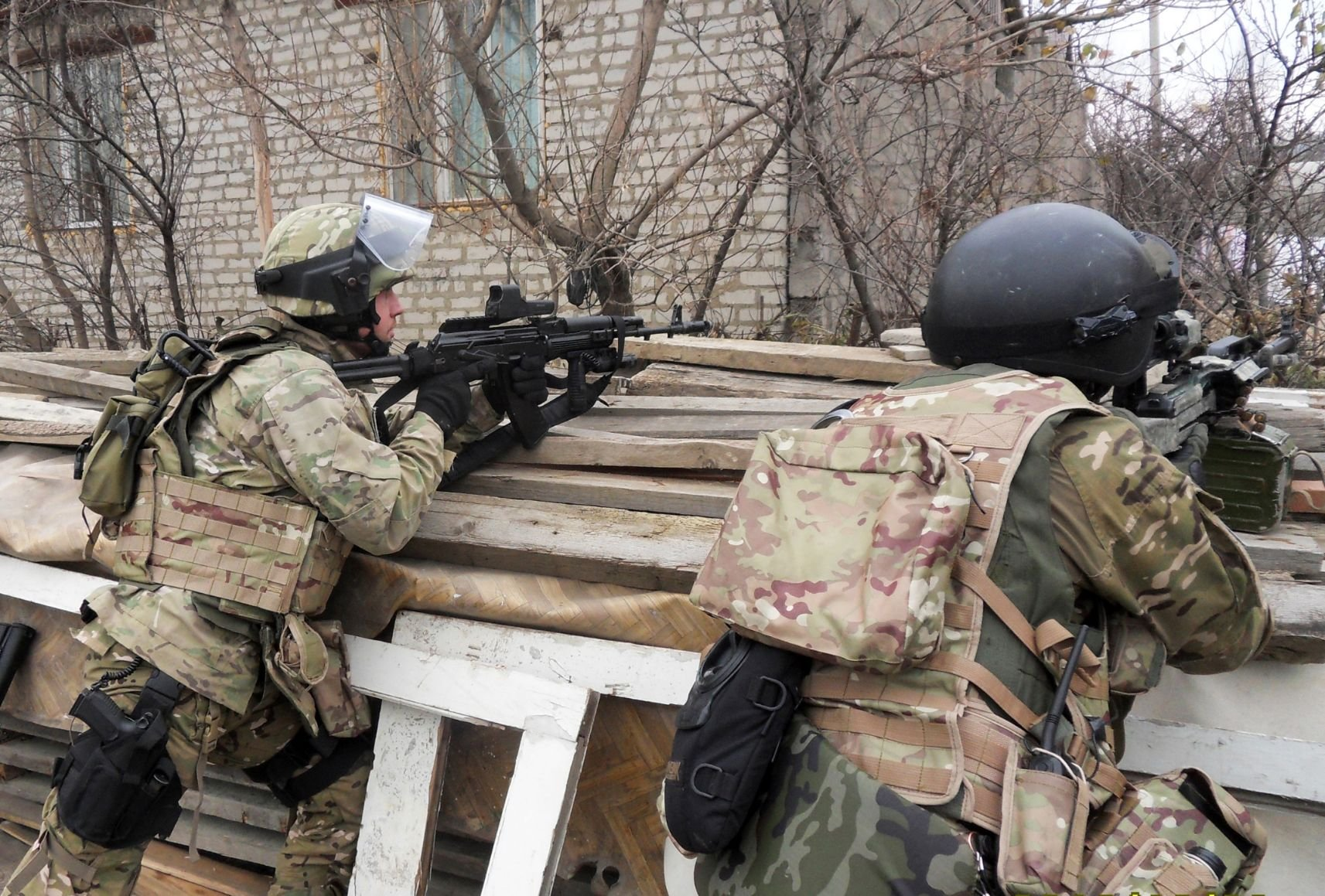
Russian FSB officers in December 2010, during an operation in Makhachkala

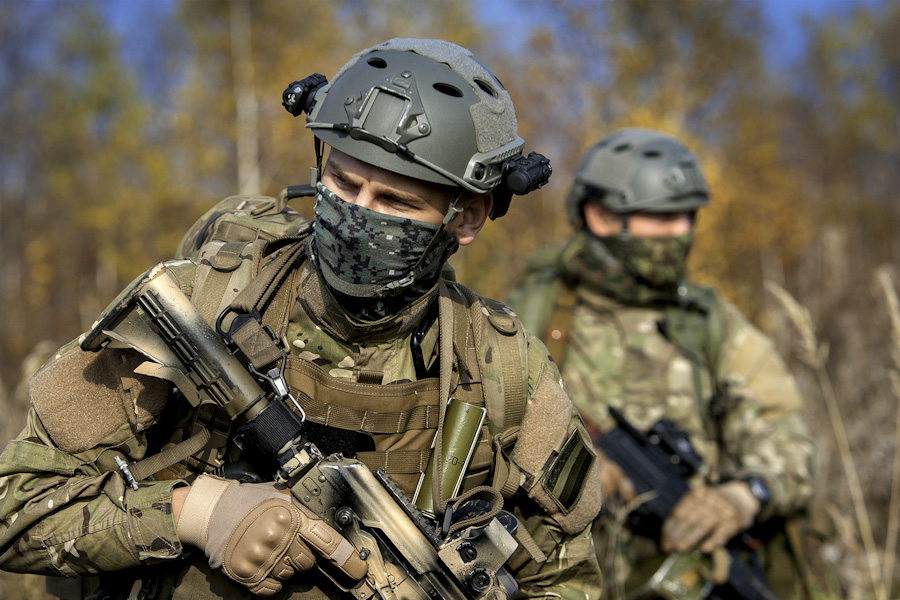
Russian special operations forces in February 2016

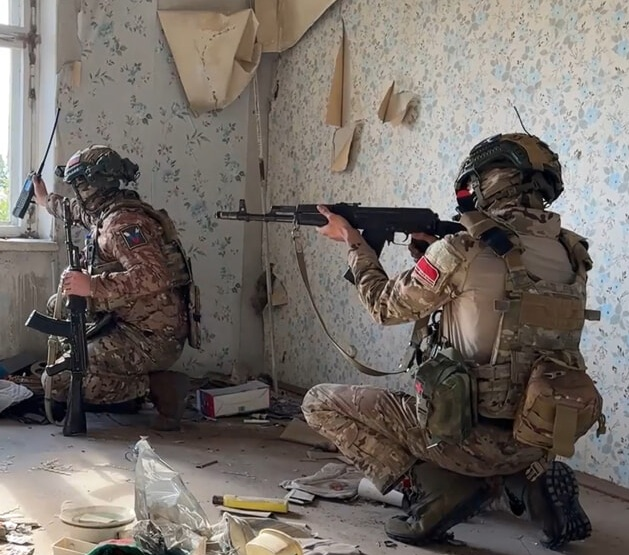
Regular Russian soldiers in the Russo-Ukrainian war wearing Multicam, 2024

=== Ukraine ===
In 2025, the Ministry of Defence announced that the Armed Forces of Ukraine would transition from the MM-14 digital camouflage into their own indigenous MultiCam variant, dubbed MM-25.

=== United Kingdom ===
The MTP retains the color palette of MultiCam but incorporates shapes similar to the previous DPM scheme.

=== United States ===
Operational Camouflage Pattern (originally codenamed Scorpion W2) is adopted by the US Army, Air Force, and Space Force as the standard issue camo, replacing the MultiCam.

=== Uzbekistan ===
Uzbek-made MultiCam clones are used by the Uzbek military.

=== Venezuela ===
Venezuela adopted Multicam-based designs in 2020. They consist of Tropical Multicam (Spanish: Trópico multicámara) and the Black Multicam (Spanish: Negro multicámara) under the name of Tiuna Patriot Camouflage Uniform (Spanish: El Uniforme Patriota Tiuna Camuflado).

== Users ==
=== Current ===
- Albania: Crye-based Multicam used by Albanian special forces personnel.
- Angola: Used by parachute units of Special Operation Brigade of the Angolan Army.
- Argentina: Adopted a variation used by Argentine troops in Patagonia and by some Argentine special forces units.
- Armenia: Used by Armenian Special Forces and the National Security Service.
- Australia:
  - MultiCam: Currently used by Special Operations Command and Police Tactical Groups.
  - Australian Multicam Camouflage Uniform (derived from MultiCam): Adopted by the Australian Defence Force for general issue from 2014 onwards, replacing the Disruptive Pattern Camouflage Uniform and the Australian MultiCam Pattern Operational Combat Uniform patterns.
- Austria: Austrian Special Forces (Jagdkommando) and Austrian troops deployed to Afghanistan.
- Belarus: Used by the Internal Troops of Belarus.
- Belgium: MultiCam was adopted as standard issue by all components of the Belgian Armed Forces except for the Naval Component in 2022.
- Belize: Used by the Belize Special Assignment Group.
- Bosnia and Herzegovina: Used by the Republika Srpska's Special Anti-Terrorist Unit.
- Brazil: Used by the Comando de Operações Táticas of the Federal Police of Brazil.
- Canada: Seen in use by Canadian Special Operations Forces Command.
- Chad: Multicam seen in use in Chad since 2008.
- Chile: Standard issue uniform of the Marine Corps and the Navy Special Warfare Division. Also used by the Chilean Air Force Commandos. As of 2021 it has been issued in the Chilean Army
- China: Reportedly used by the People's Armed Police (PAP).
- Cyprus: Main combat uniform of the Cypriot National Guard army branch.
- Denmark: Standard uniform of the Danish military.
- Egypt: In use by Egyptian Navy Special Forces.
- Estonia: In use by Estonian Special Operations Force.
- Finland Seen in use with some members of the Coastal Jaeger Battalion and the Special Jaeger Battalion.
- France:
  - Used by the Special Operations Command's units.
  - A French-developed camouflage inspired by MultiCam, called Bariolage Multi-Environnement (BME), is due to become the standard camouflage pattern of the French Armed Forces from 2024 onwards.
- Georgia: Standard uniform of the Defense Forces, modified variant produced locally. Issued also to law enforcement and security agencies.
- Haiti: Used by units of the Haitian National Police.
  - Brigade de Lutte contre les Vols de Véhicules (BLVV)
  - Brigade de Lutte contre le Trafic de Stupéfiants (BLTS)
  - Police Frontalière (POLIFRONT)
- Hong Kong SAR: Crye Precision and Tru-Spec made Multicam and Multicam Tropic uniforms are in use with the Special Duties Unit.
- India: Used by MARCOS commandos, Garud Commando Force and Paras in jungle operations.
- Ireland: Army Ranger Wing operators are being issued with Multicam as of July 2023.
- Indonesia: A variant based on US Army OCP with local DPM color palette used by Indonesian Army known as Loreng Angkatan Darat. A Desert/Arid variant intended to replace the older local Desert DPM Variant are also Present. Kopassus are also issued with tropical variant.
- Jordan: Used by Jordanian special forces units as the M2015 JSOC pattern.
- Lebanon: Operational Camouflage Pattern (based on MultiCam predecessor), Standard issued uniform for all branches replaced U.S. Woodland on 21 November 2017.
- Malta: Replacing the woodland pattern with Mutlticam uniforms from Crye for the Maltese military.
- Malaysia: MultiCam being used by the 21st Special Service Group as of August 2025.
- Montenegro: Standard uniform of the Montenegro military. Made by YDS Textiles with a Montenegrin motif in the camo print.
- Netherlands: Korps Commandotroepen (KCT) and the Netherlands Marine Corps used it on tour in Afghanistan. The Dutch-made MultiCam camo is made by NFM Group.
- New Zealand: New Zealand Special Air Service, New Zealand Army, Royal New Zealand Air Force, For use by the Special Operations Forces (NZSOF) in Afghanistan and Iraq.
- North Korea: First seen during a parade in October 2020 wearing supposed Multicam clones by the Korean's People Army.
- Norway: Norwegian Special Operations Command forces: Special Operations Command and Naval Special Operations Command and 339 Special Operations Aviation Squadron.
- Philippines: Crye Precision and commercial clone copies used by numerous Special Forces units in the Armed Forces of the Philippines.
- Poland: Polish Jednostka Wojskowa GROM, Agencja Bezpieczeństwa Wewnętrznego, Biuro Ochrony Rządu and Jednostka Wojskowa Komandosów units uses "Suez", a slightly modified MultiCam pattern.
- Portugal: Used by Portuguese Armed Forces (Portuguese Paratroopers, Commandos, Special Operations Troops Centre, NOTP and Special Actions Detachment).
- Romania: UF-Pro-made MultiCam uniforms used by Romanian special forces.
- Russia:
  - Multicam: Russia's FSB Alpha Group and Vympel and the MVD's SOBR Group. Russian Special Forces in Syria were also seen using MultiCams. Zaslon forces use them on occasions when needed.
  - VKPO 3.0: Local Multicam clone used by regular units.
- Singapore: Used by Special Operations Force and Naval Diving Unit of the Singapore Armed Forces and also by the STAR unit and Gurkha Contingent of the Singapore Police Force.
- Syria: Standard issue pattern and combat uniform of Syrian Armed Forces since 2025.
- Slovenia: SLOCAM.
- South Korea: South Korean UDT/SEAL operators.
- Spain: Spanish Army's Special Operations Group and Special Naval Warfare Force personnel.
- Sweden: Used by the SOG and special forces support units as well as UH-60M crew members.
- Thailand: Combat Control Team Special Operation Regiment Royal Thai Air Force, Royal Thai Armed Forces Headquarters's Counter Terrorist Operations Center.
- Tunisia: Seen used by USGN in Raoued operation.
- Turkey: Used by some units within the Turkish Special Forces.
- Ukraine: Used by various Ukrainian special forces units. The older MM-14 pattern is being phased out in favor of MM-25, derived from MultiCam, though both are being issued to service members.
- United Kingdom:
  - MultiCam: Seen in use by United Kingdom Special Forces personnel.
    - Used by Royal Marines to replace MTP.
  - Multi-Terrain Pattern: British Army and Royal Air Force from 2011 onwards.
- United States:
  - MultiCam: U.S. Army, U.S. Navy EOD, United States Special Operations Command, and U.S. Air Force.
    - FBIHostage Rescue Team
  - Operational Camouflage Pattern (based on MultiCam predecessor): Adopted by the US Army, Air Force, and Space Force as standard issue.
- Uzbekistan: Uzbek-made version used by the Uzbek military.
- Venezuela: Adopted Multicam-based designs in 2020. They consist of Trópico multicámara (Tropical Multicam) and the Negro multicámara (Black Multicam) under the El Uniforme Patriota Tiuna Camuflado (Tiuna Patriot Camouflage Uniform).

=== Future ===
- Ireland: An Irish version known as Irish Transitional Multi-Cam Pattern (ITMCP) is being developed by the Irish military to replace in their DPM camouflage uniforms with the ITCMP pattern designed by Crye Precision. ITMCP will be part of the upcoming DF Combat Clothing System, which would cost €40 million.

=== Former ===
- Afghanistan: Was worn by Afghan National Army commandos. Known to be used by operators of Crisis Response Unit 222.

=== Others ===
- China: An "all-terrain" MultiCam-influenced pattern camouflage that debuted during the 2015 Victory Day Parade. It was intended to replace the Type 07 uniform; ultimately it was not adopted by the PLA.

=== Non-state users ===
- Al-Nusra Front
- Sham Legion
- Turkistan Islamic Party
- Ajnad al-Kavkaz
- Mandalay People's Defense Force
- Taliban

== Gallery ==
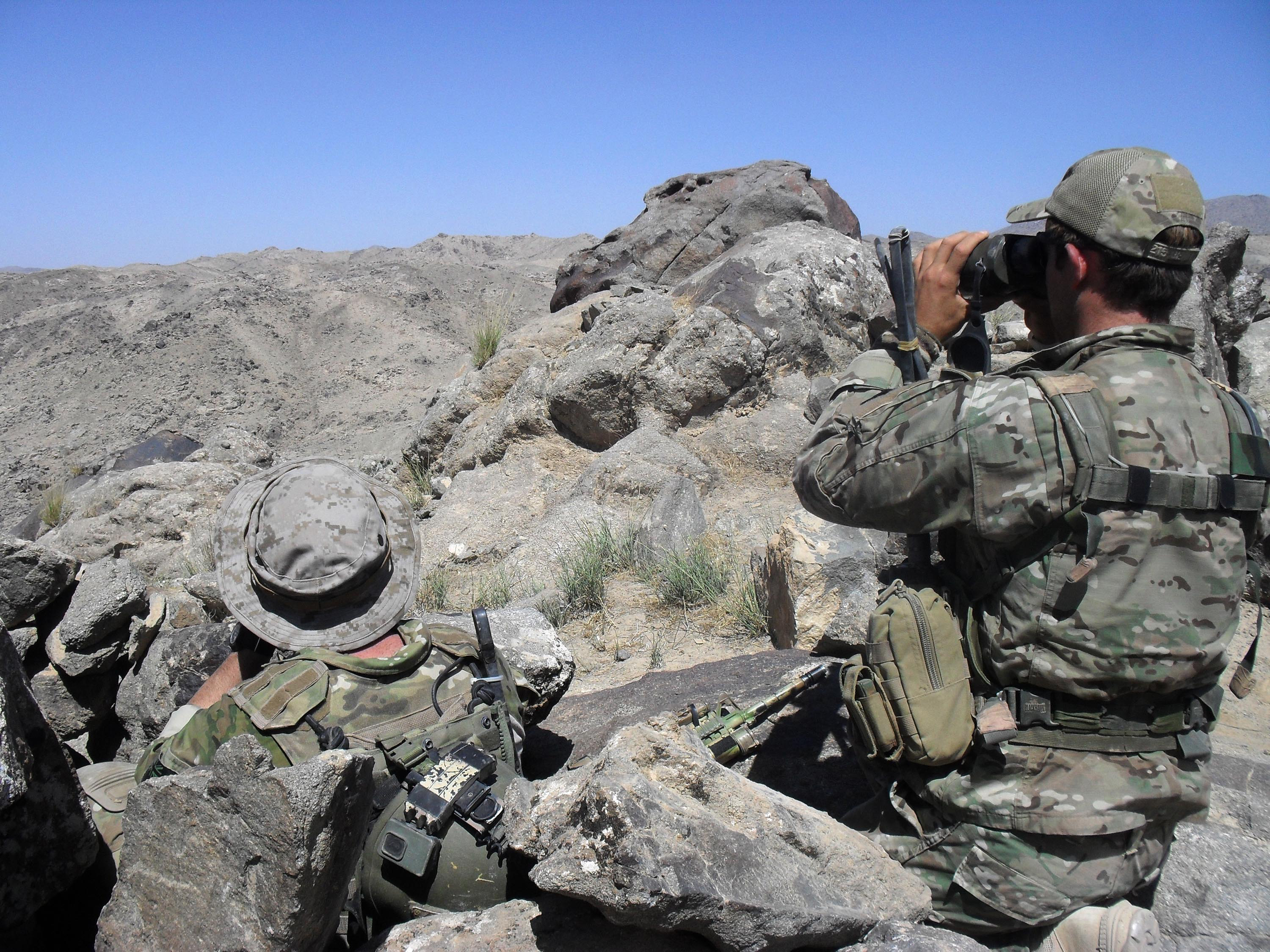
Australian special forces in MultiCam, June 2010

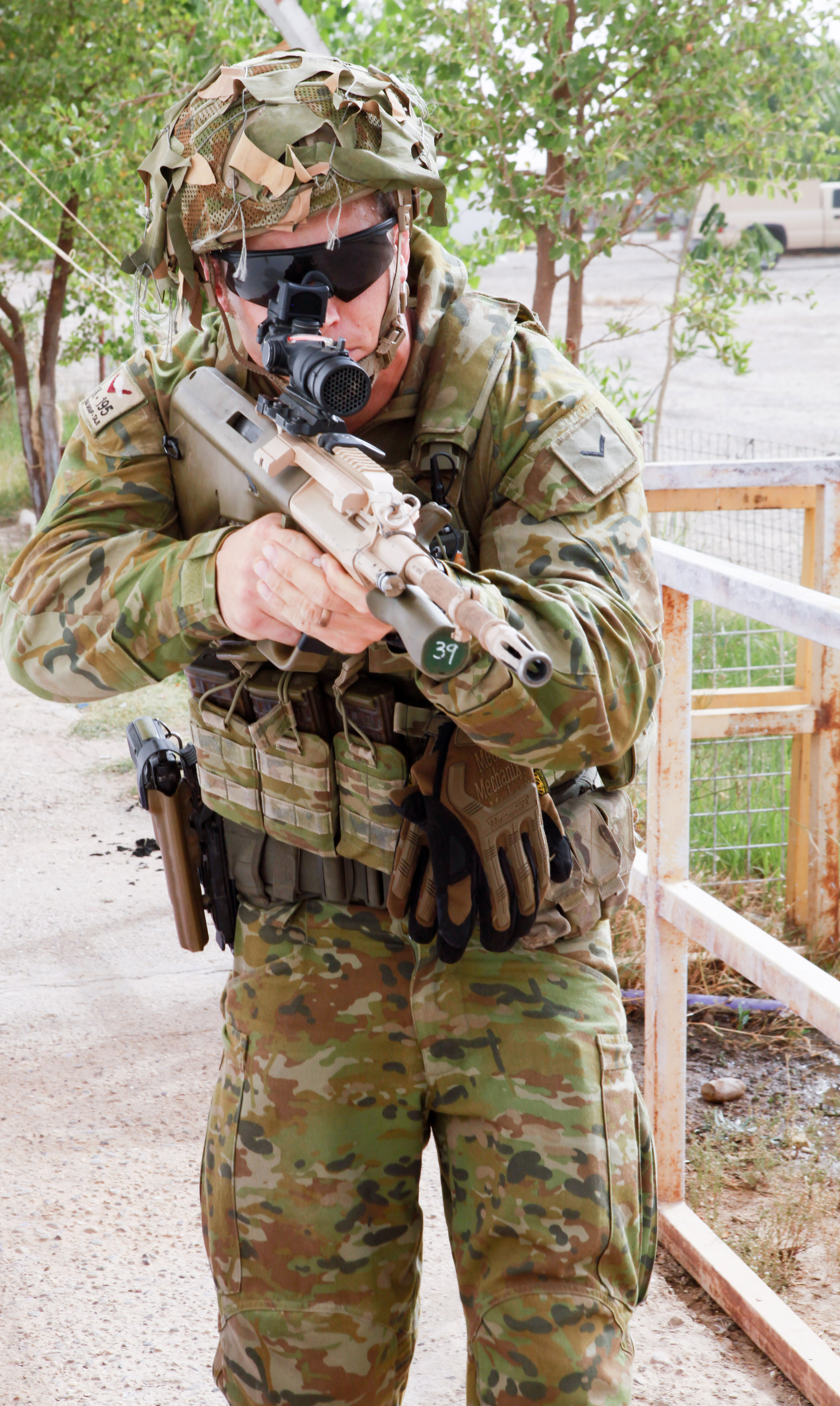
An Australian soldier wearing a combat uniform and kit in AMCU pattern, in Iraq, 2016

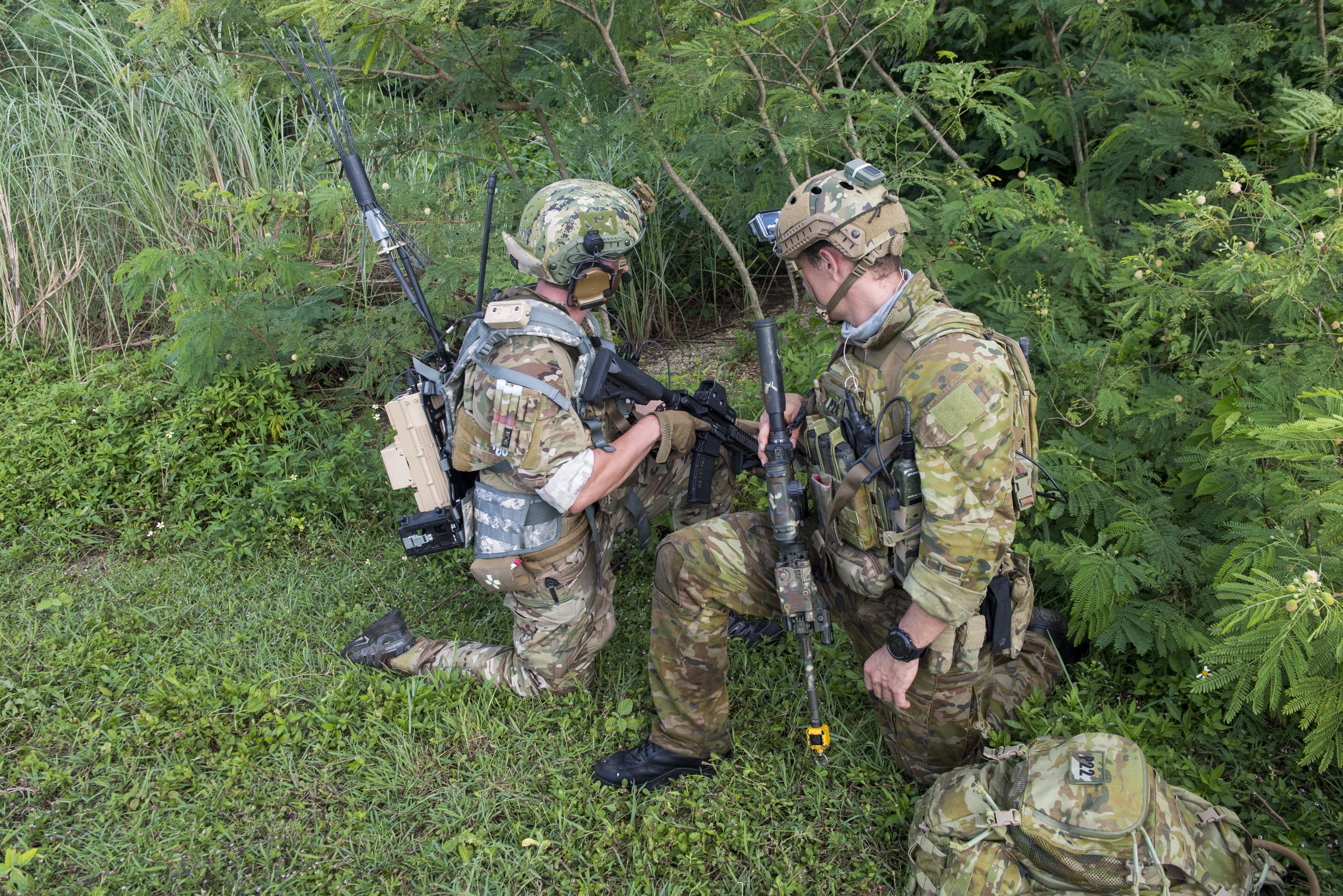
Operational Camouflage Pattern (OCP) and Australian Multicam
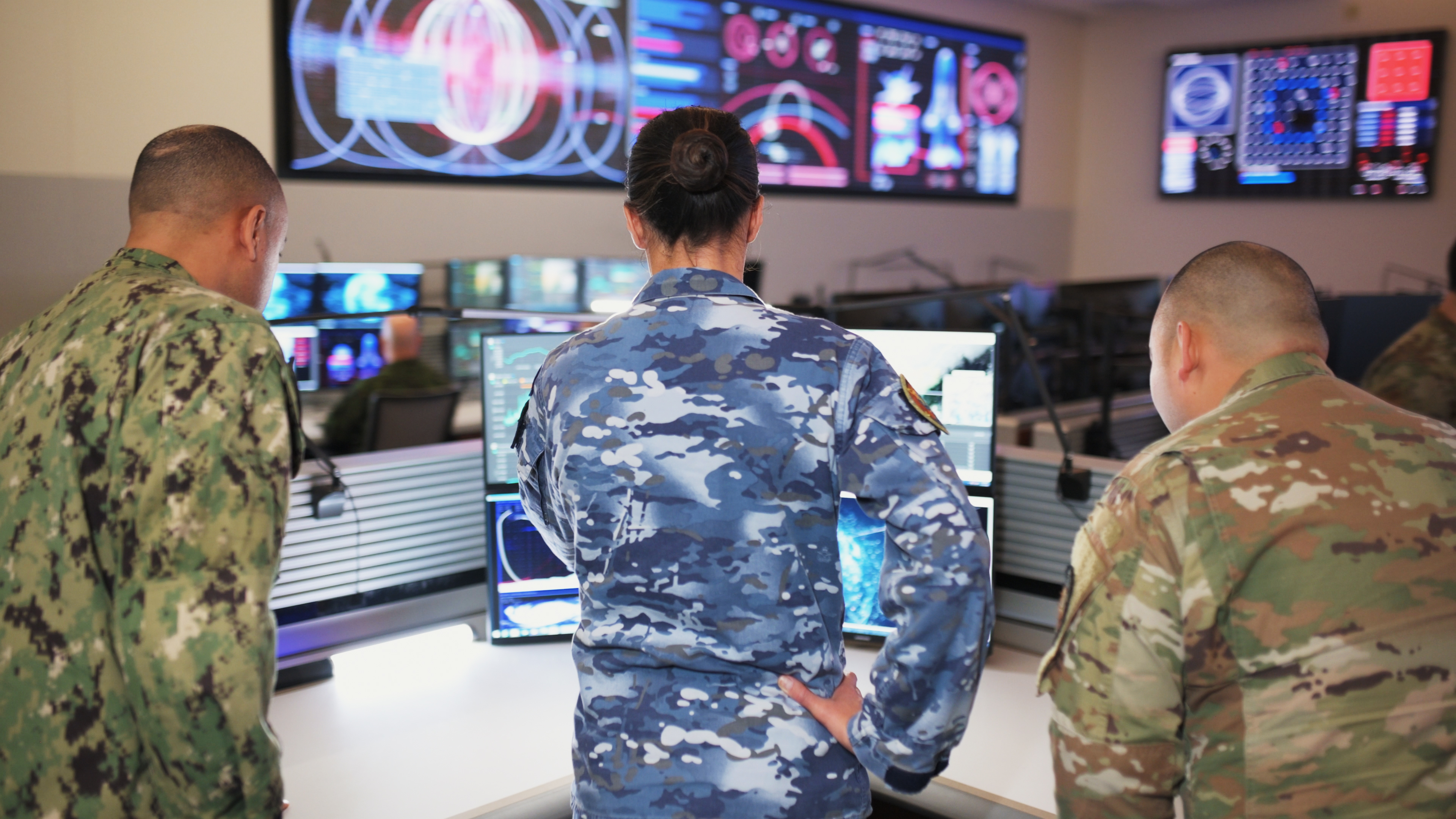
The primarily blue colour scheme of the General Purpose Uniform, seen from behind.

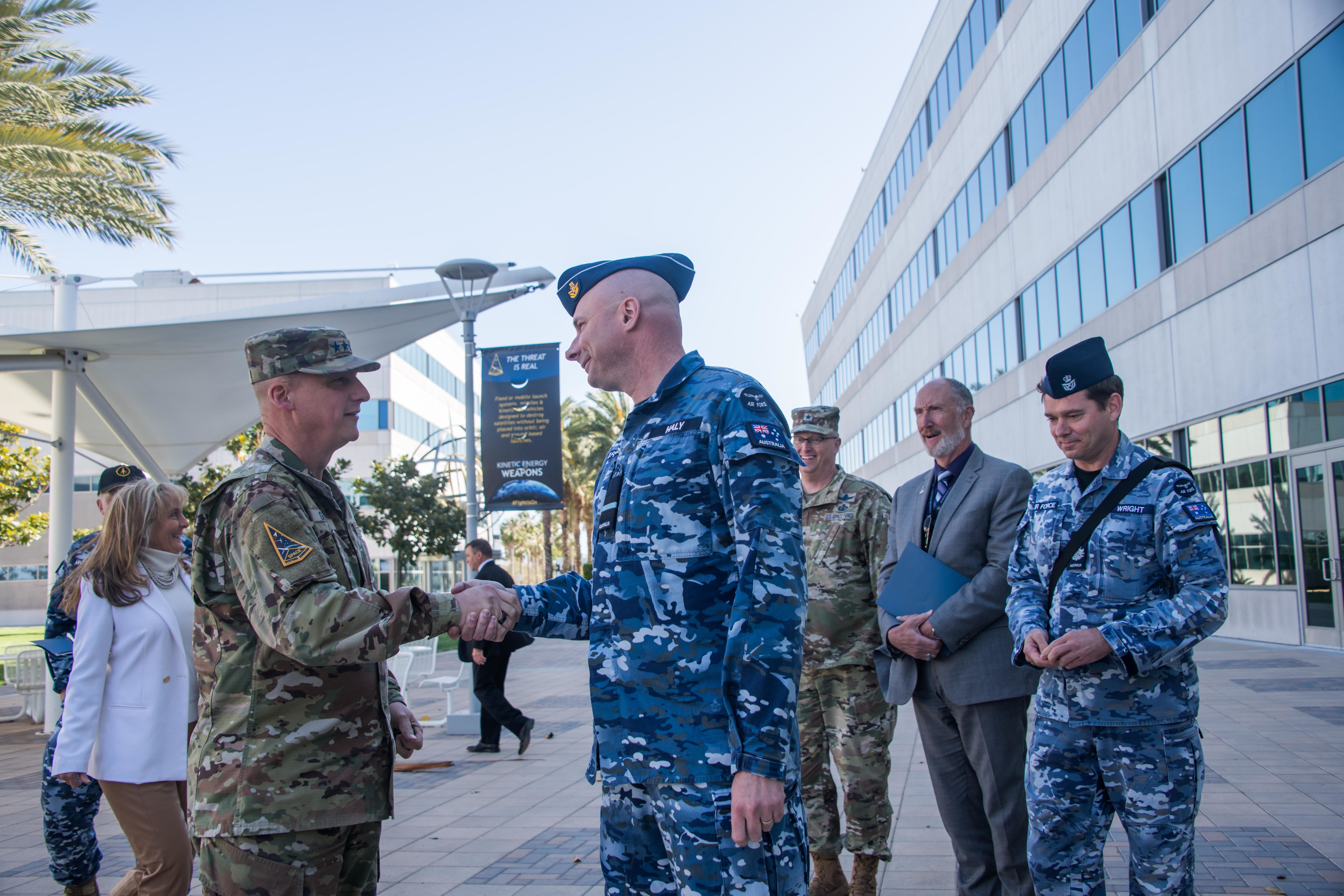
Two members of the RAAF wearing the GPU in 2022
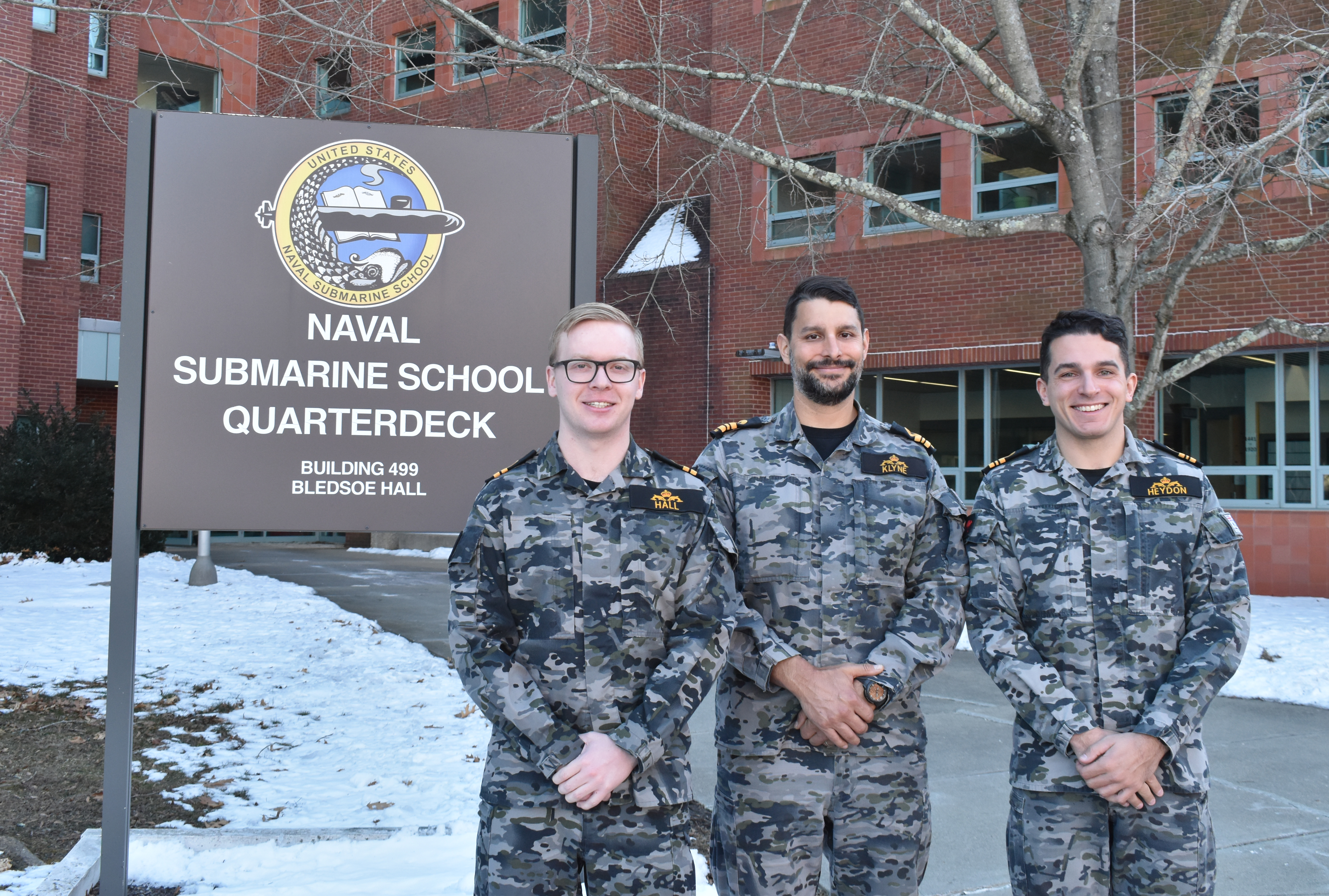
Royal Australian Navy officers wearing the MMPU in 2024
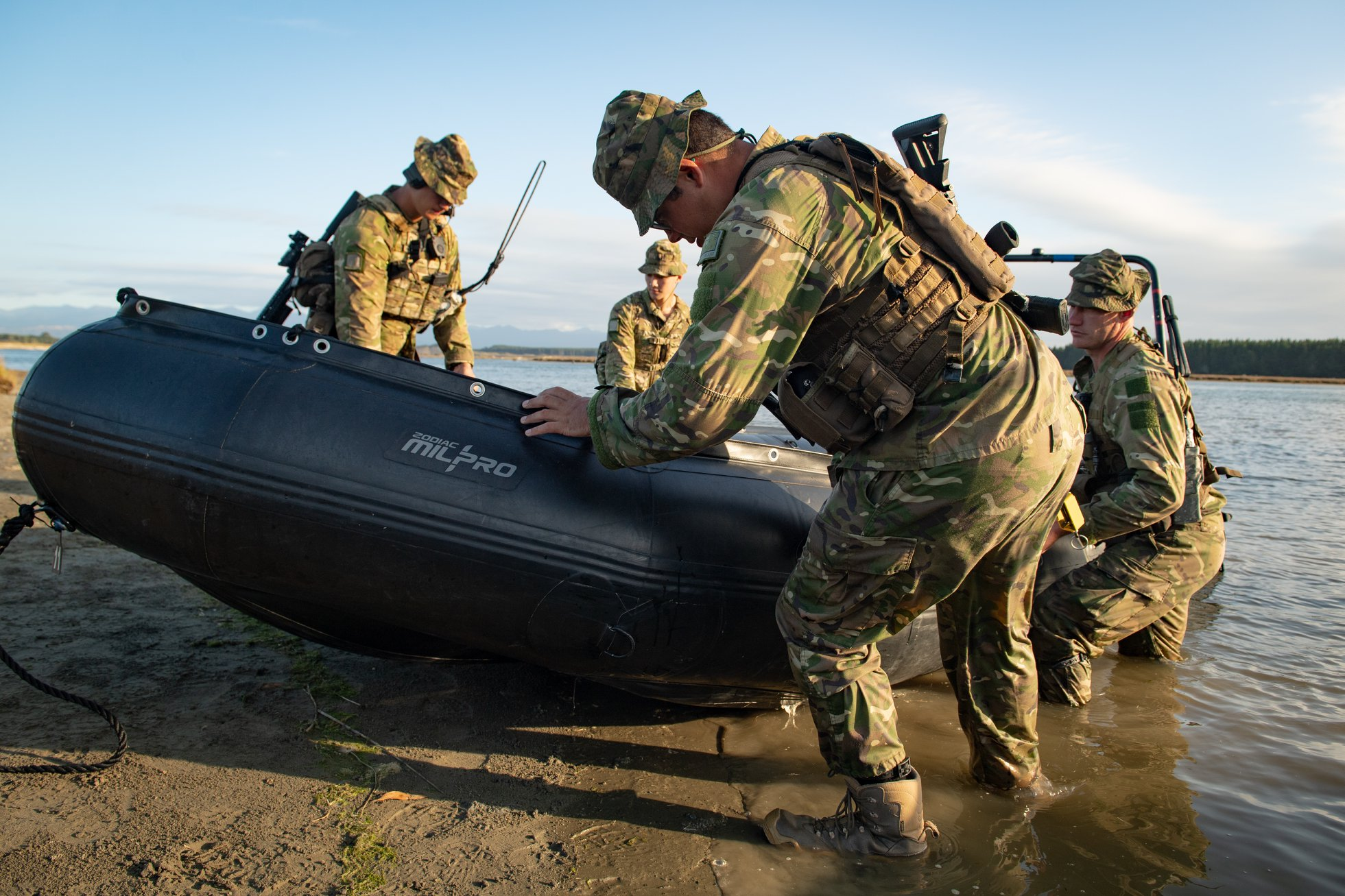
NZ Army soldiers wearing the NZMTP uniform during training.

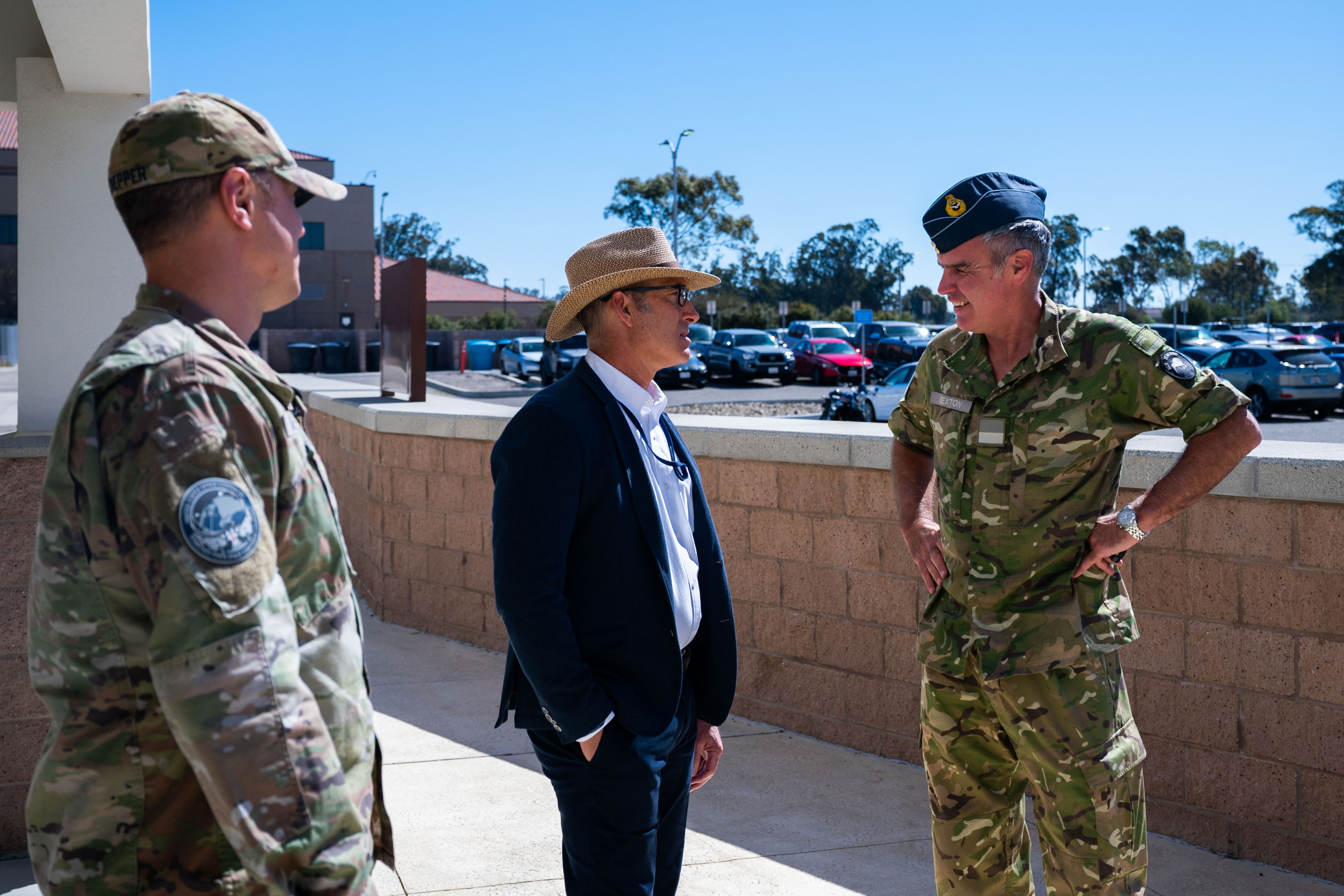
A Royal New Zealand Air Force officer, right. wearing NZMTP.
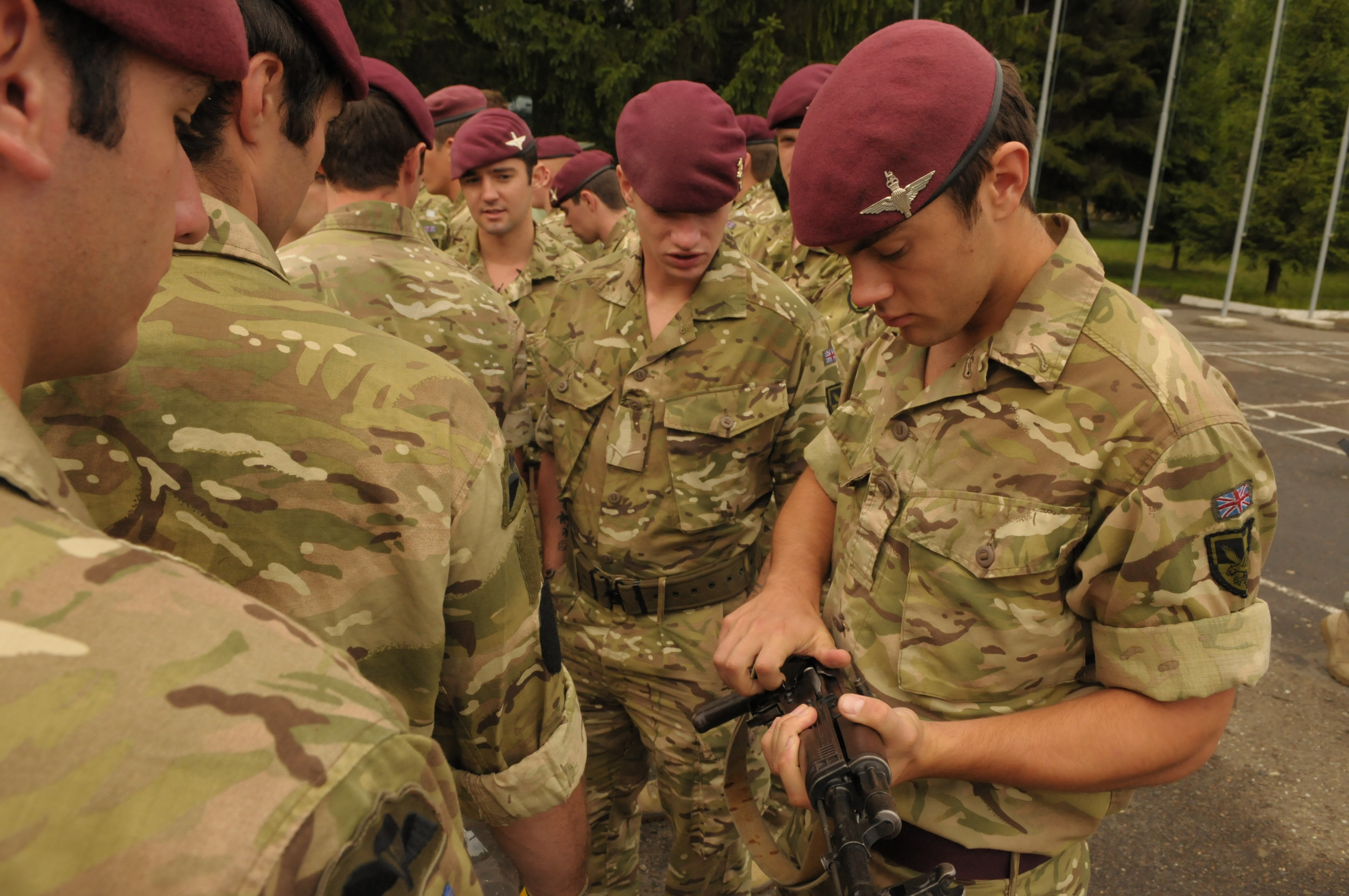
British Army paratroopers wearing MTP during Rapid Trident 2011

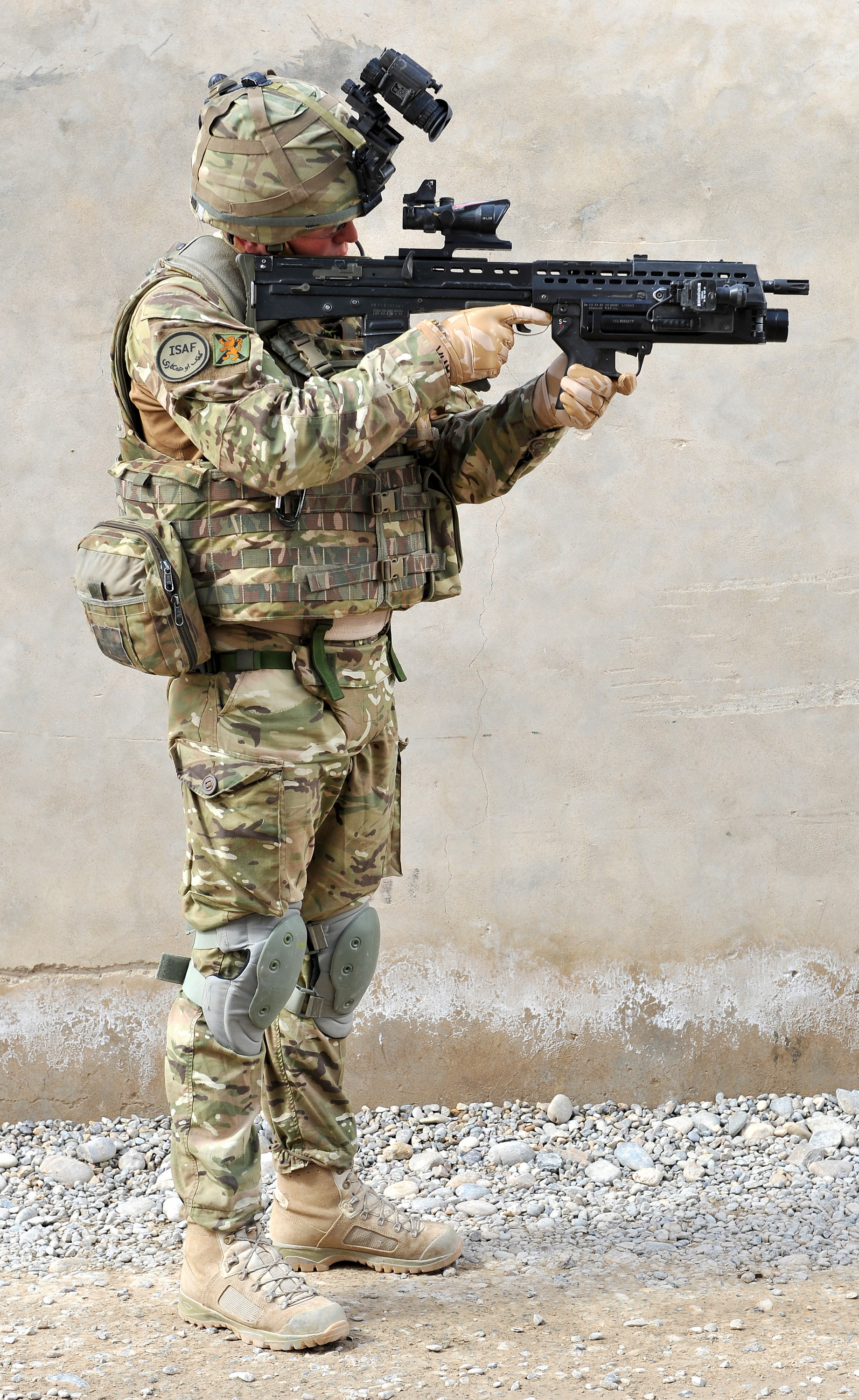
British Army soldier wearing MTP in Afghanistan, 2011

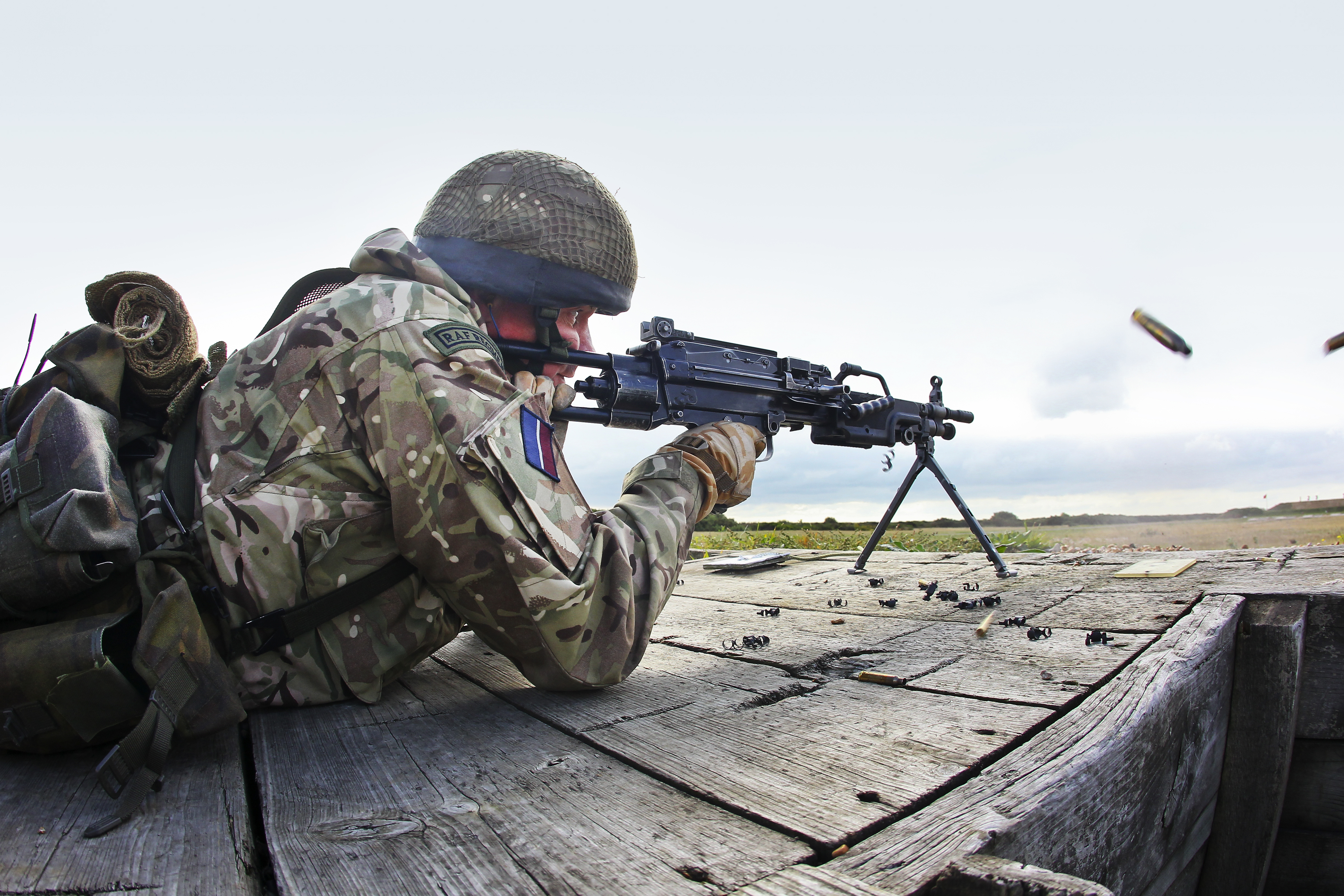
RAF Regiment reservist wearing MTP at Hythe Range Complex, 2013

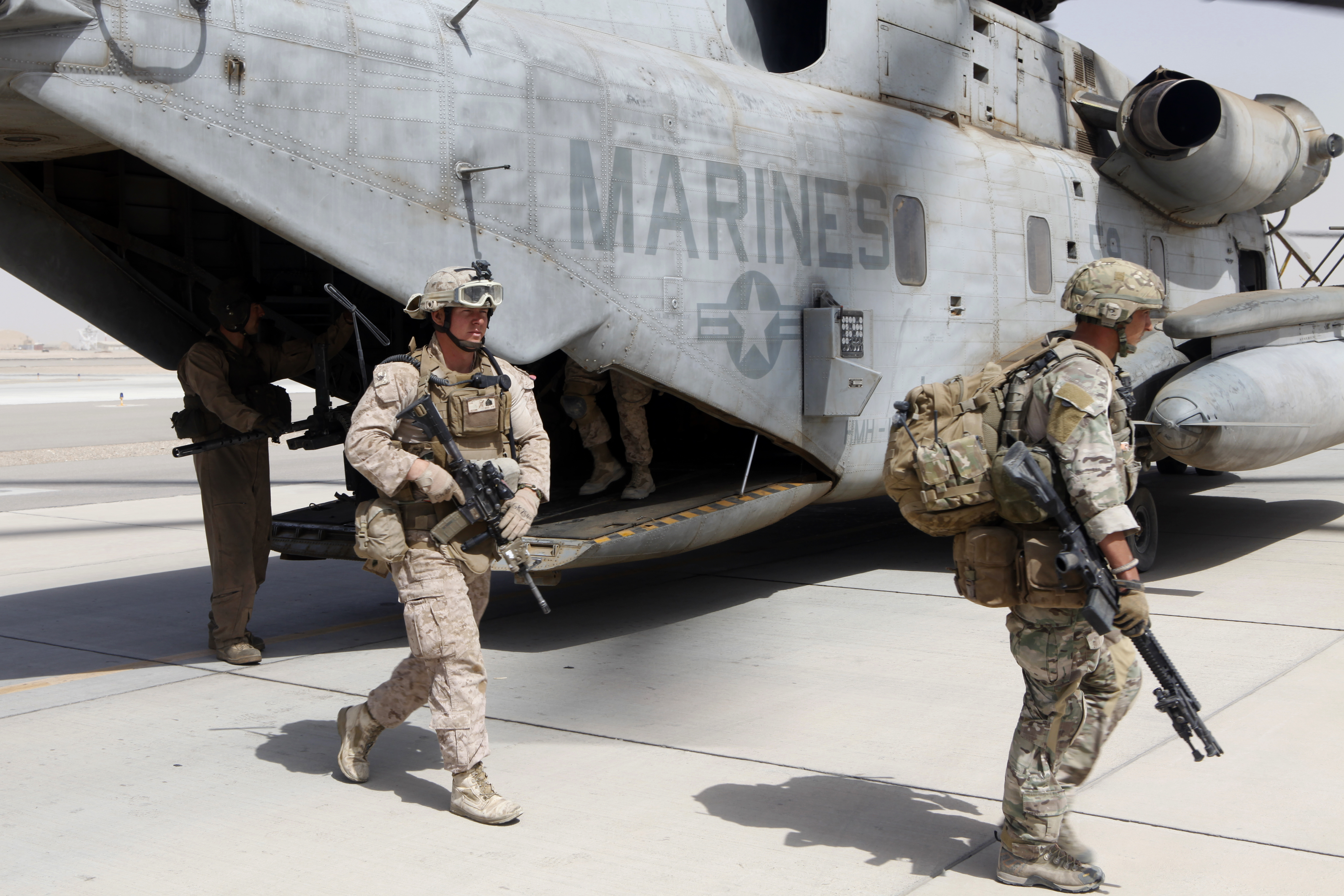
Special Forces Support Group member wearing MultiCam in Afghanistan, 2013

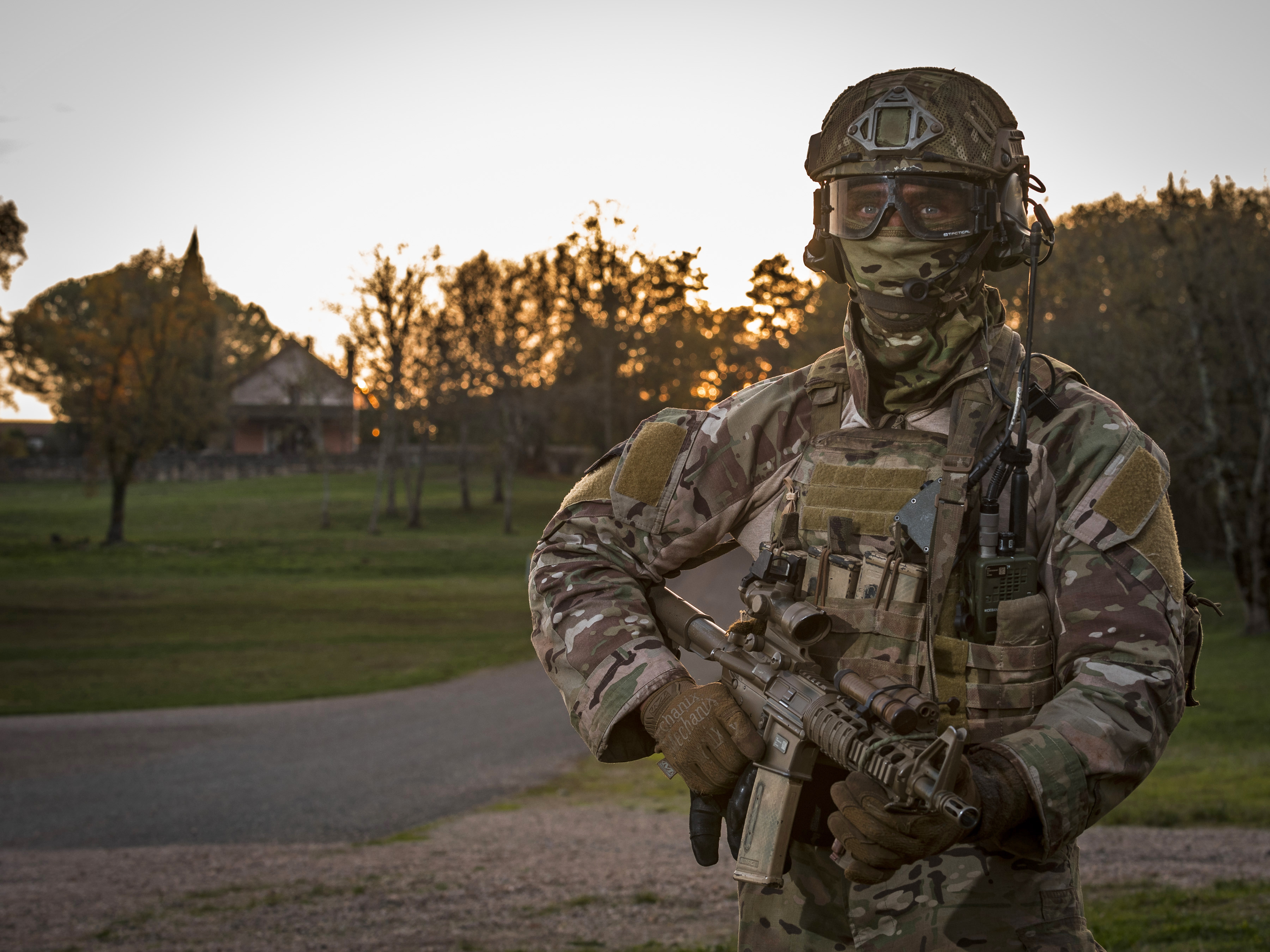
Pathfinder Platoon member wearing MultiCam on exercise, 2018

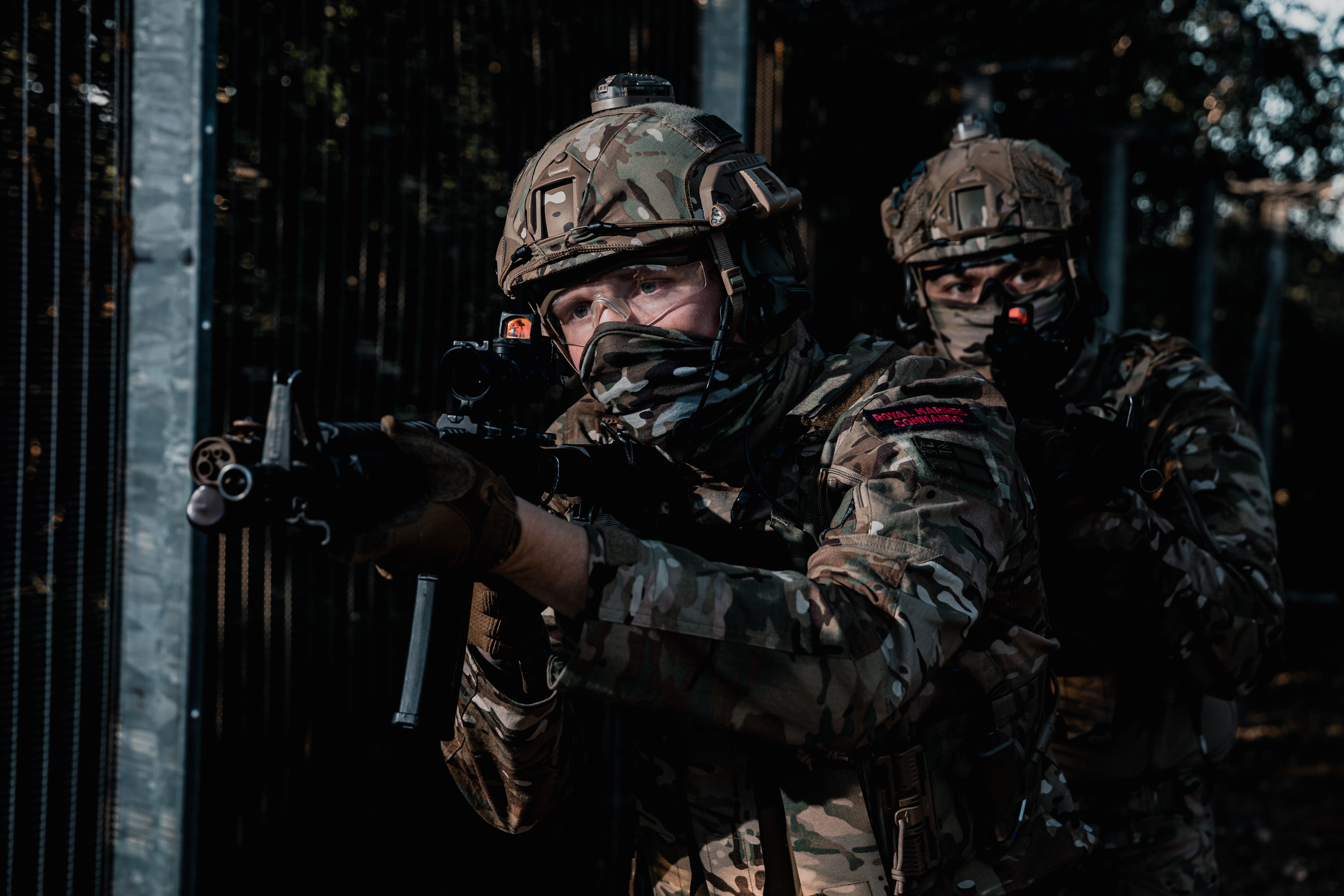
Royal Marines demonstrating their newly adopted MultiCam uniforms in 2020

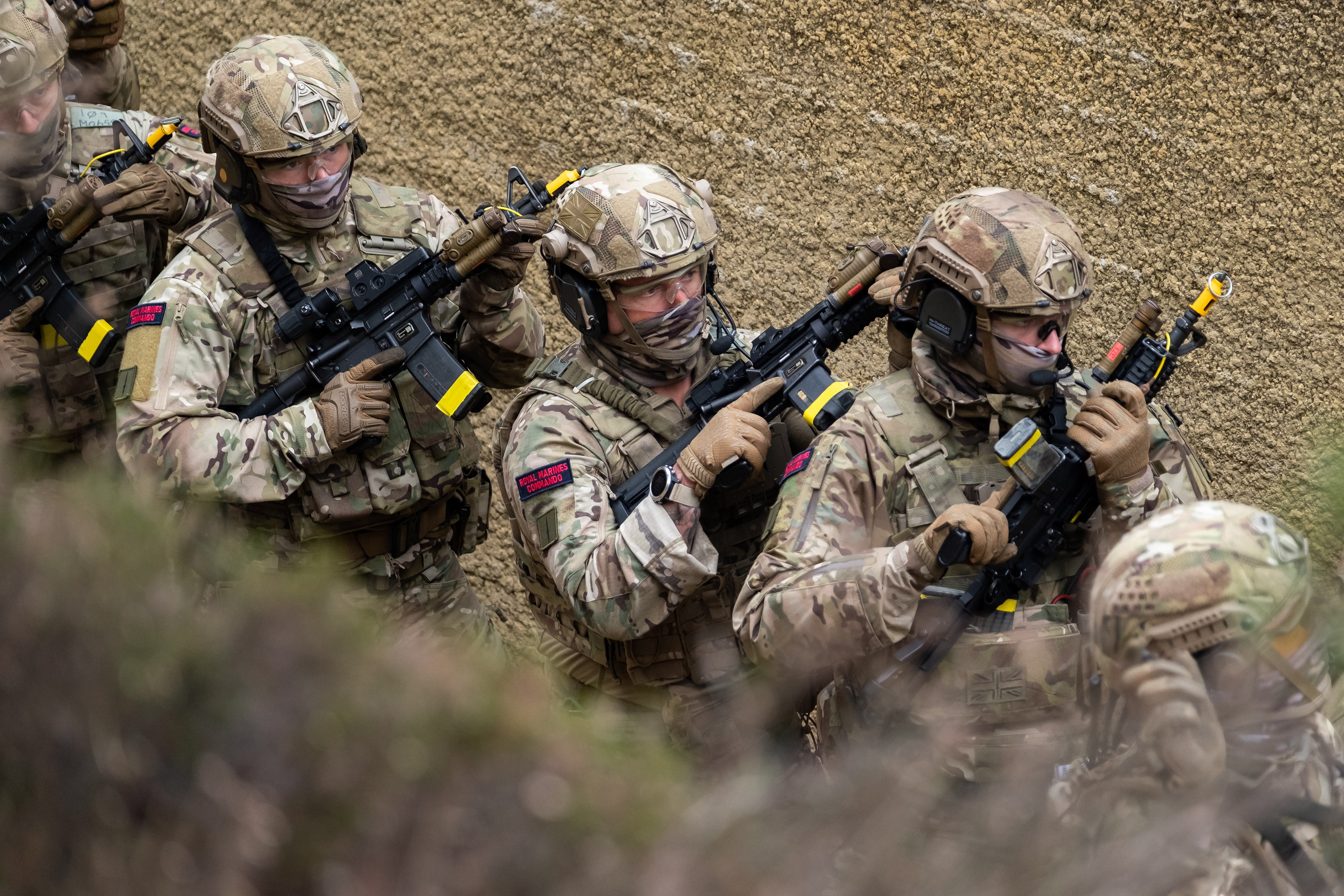
Royal Marines wearing a combination of MultiCam (uniform, helmet cover) and MTP (body armour, load carrying equipment) items at Bovington Training Area, 2021

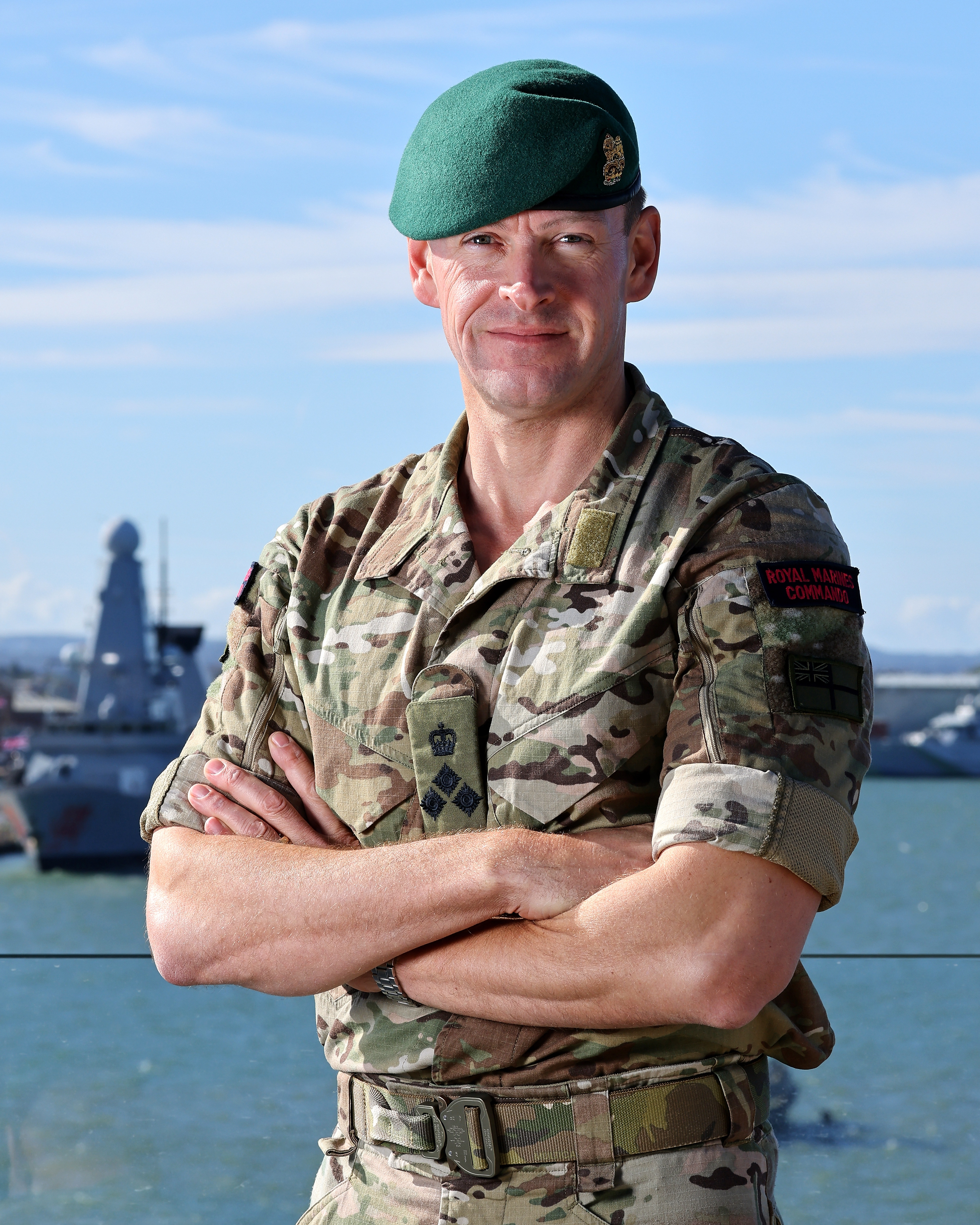
Royal Marine brigadier wearing MultiCam at the Navy Command Headquarters, 2021
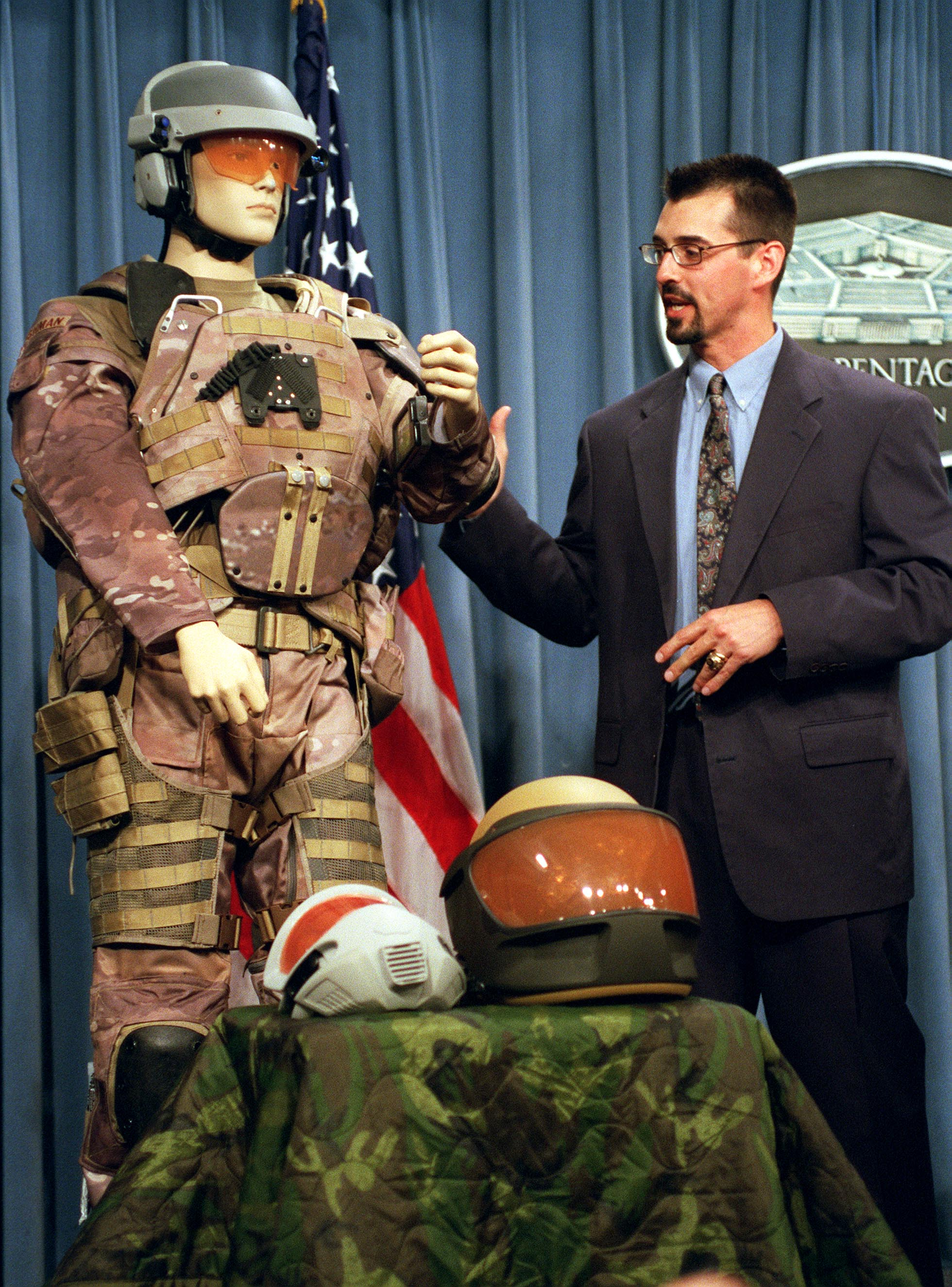
An early prototype Scorpion pattern uniform on display at the Pentagon in May 2002

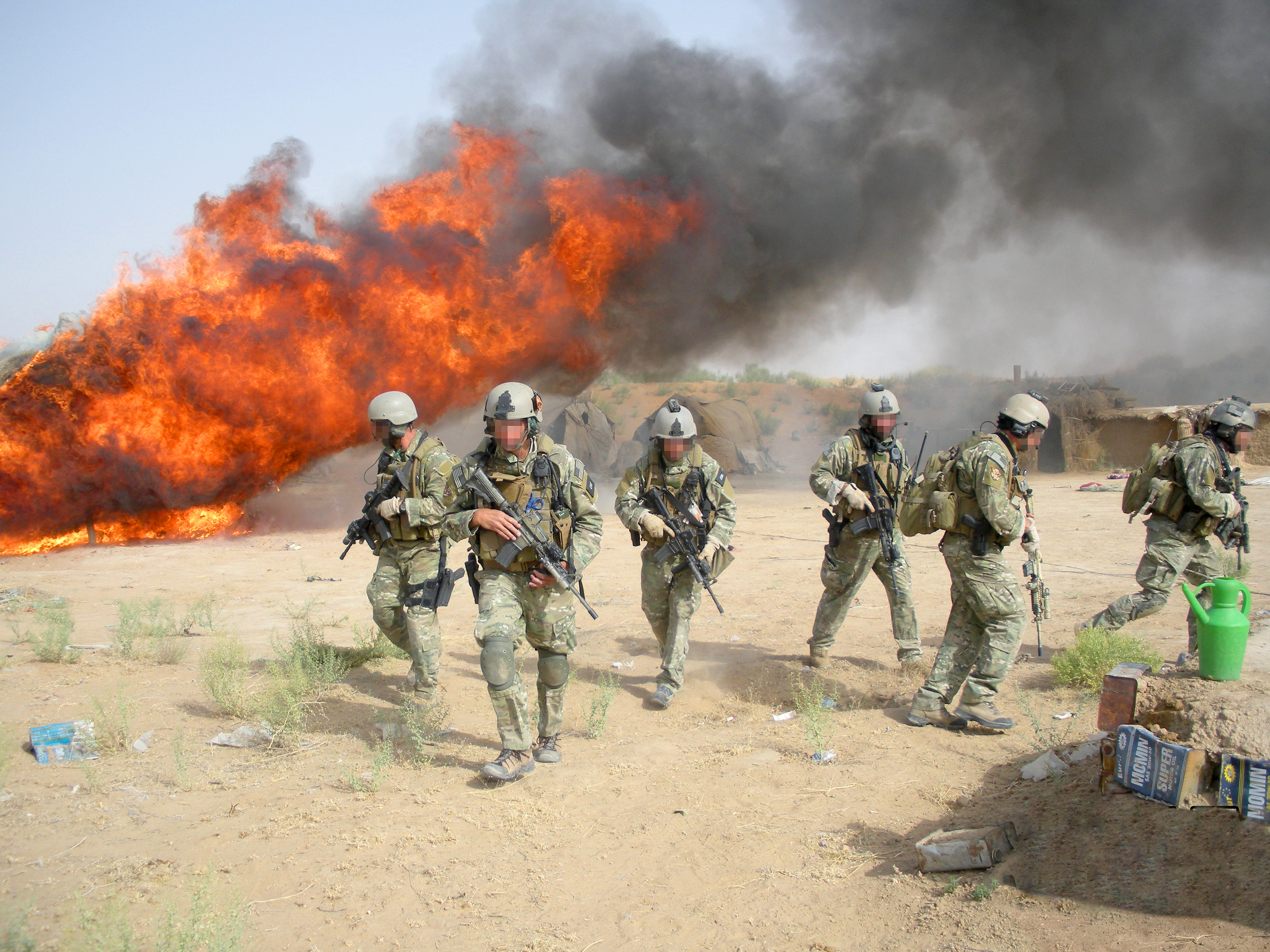
DEA FAST agents armed with M4A1 Carbines in Afghanistan, June 2008

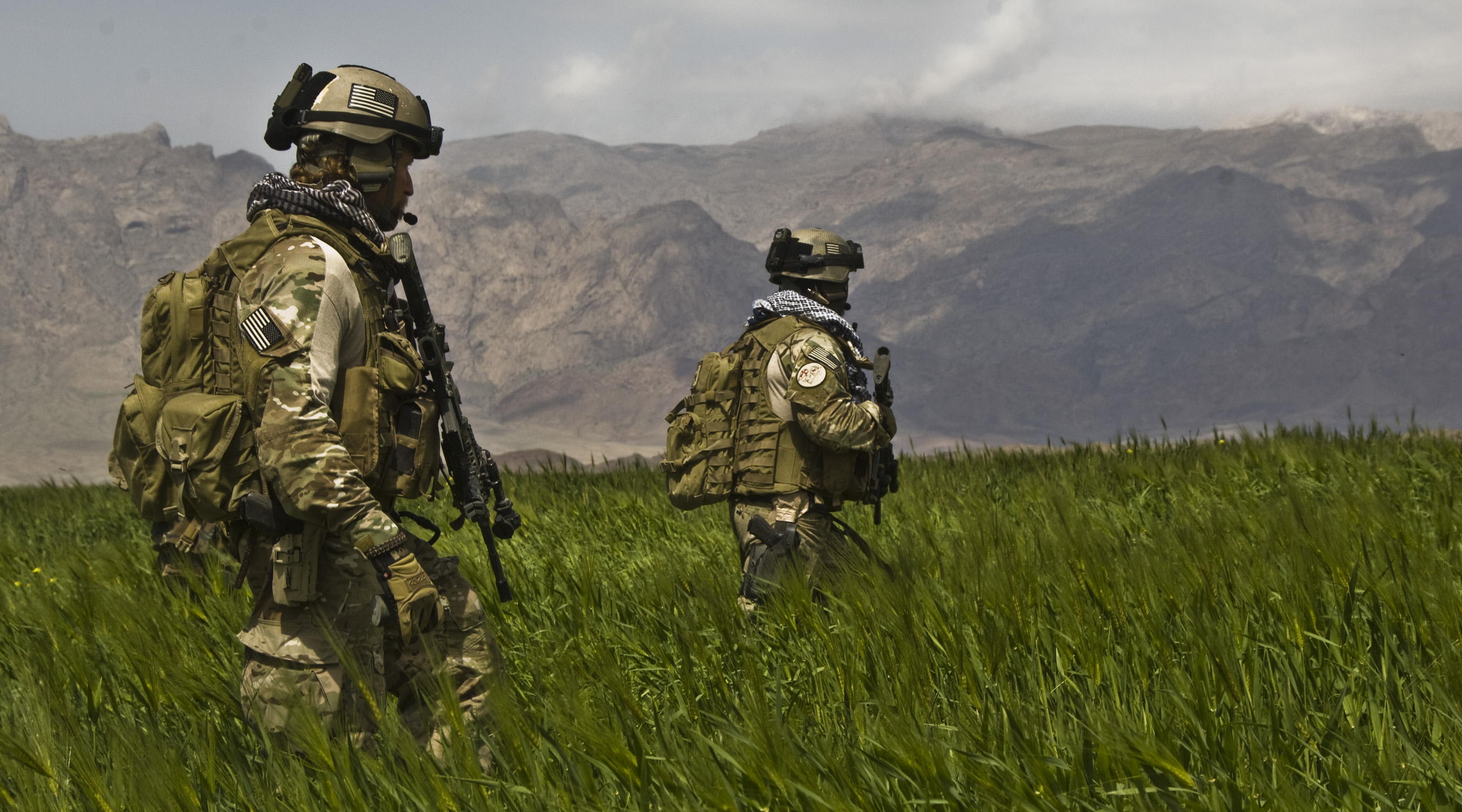
U.S. Army Special Forces' 3rd Special Forces Group (United States) in the Farah Province of Afghanistan, April 2009

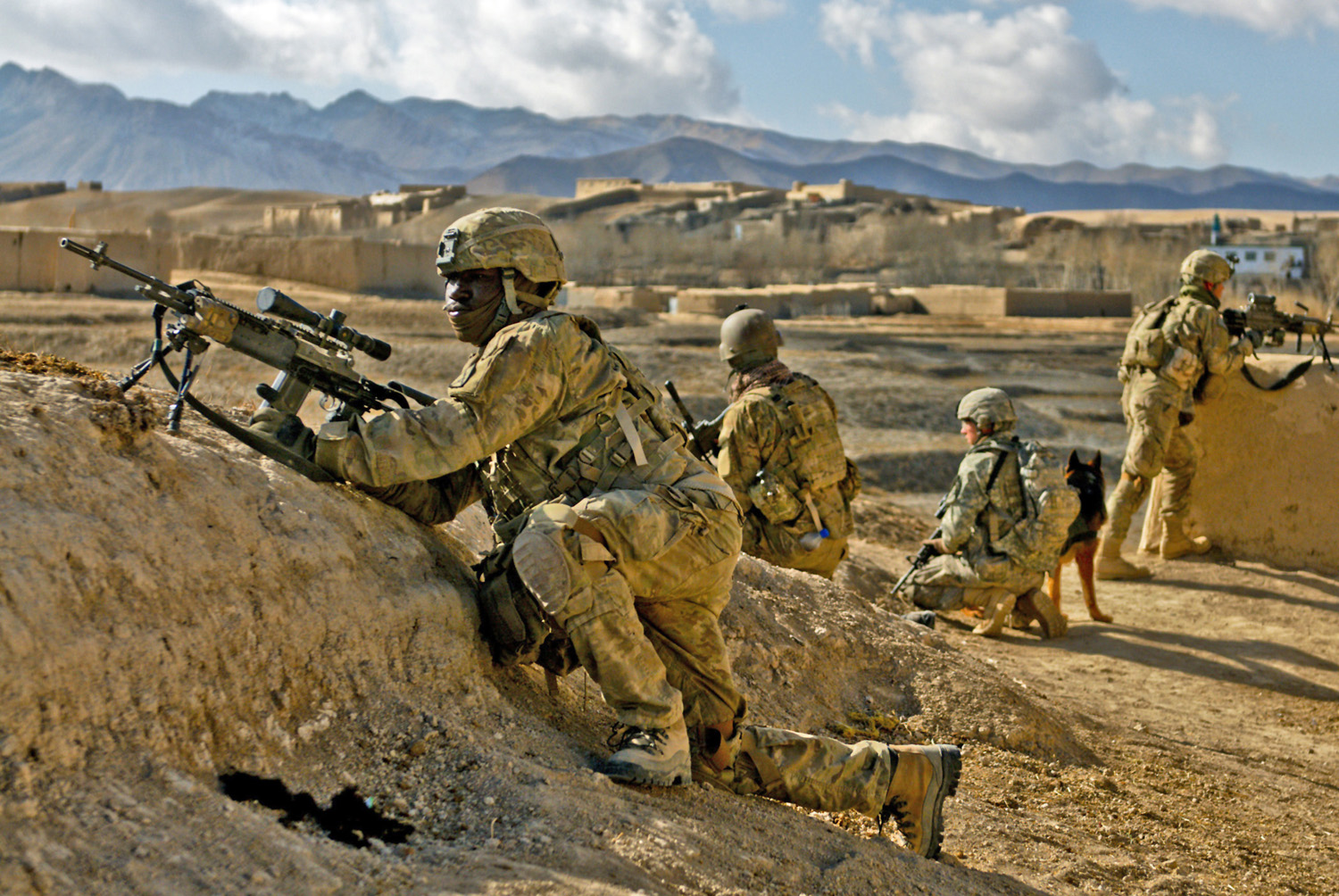
U.S. Army soldiers from the 10th Mountain Division in Logar Province, January 2011

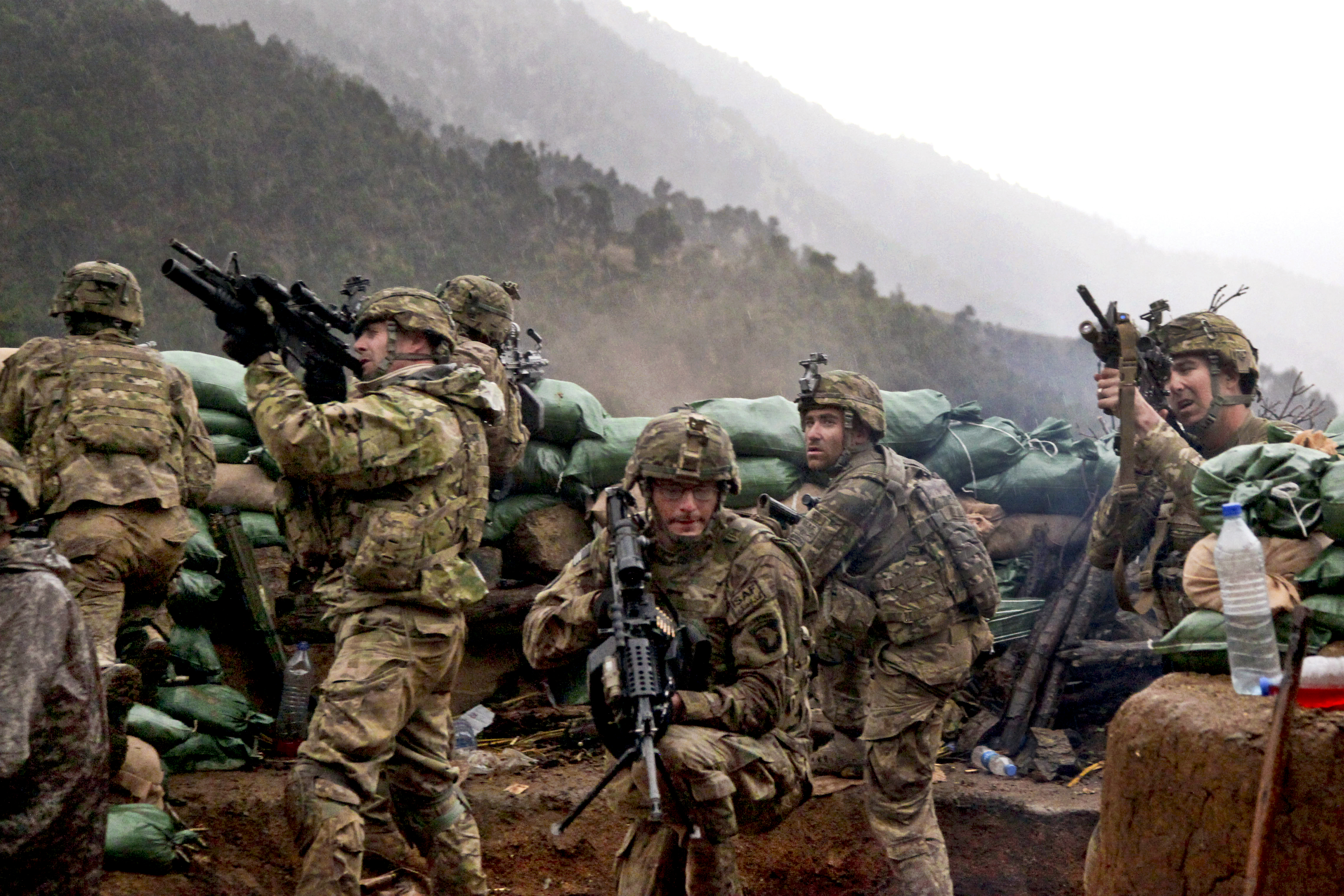
U.S. Army soldiers from the 101st Airborne Division in Kunar Province, Afghanistan, March 2011

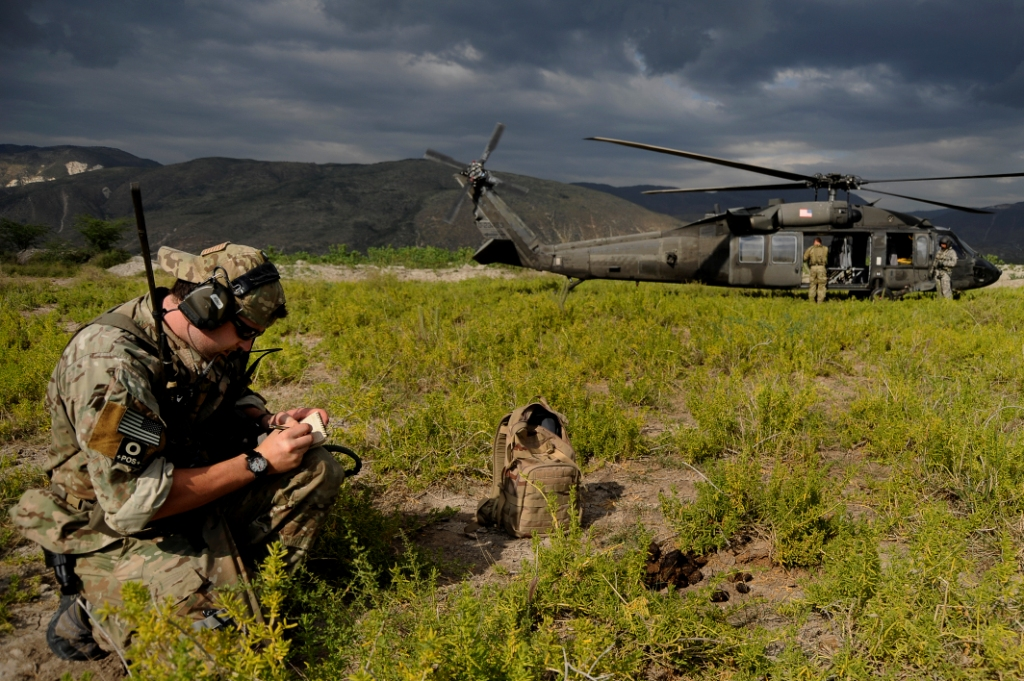
A U.S. Air Force Combat Controller operating in Haiti as part of Operation Unified Response, January 2010

== See also ==
- Future Force Warrior
- U.S. Army trial patterns
- Soldier Plate Carrier System
