= Sport in Algeria =

Sport in Algeria dates back to antiquity. In the Aurès Mountains, people played games such as El Kherdba or El khergueba (a chess variant). Playing cards, checkers and chess is part of Algerian culture. Horse racing (fantasia) and rifle shooting are among the recreational traditions of Algeria.

The first Algerian, Arab, and African Olympic gold medalist was Boughera El Ouafi in the marathon at the 1928 Olympics of Amsterdam. The second Algerian medalist was also a marathon runner, Alain Mimoun, who won the marathon at the 1956 Summer Olympics in Melbourne.

The Ministry of Youth and Sports in Algeria manages sport-related activities.

== Popular sports ==
=== Football ===
The most convenient and the most popular sport in Algeria is association football. During the Algerian War, the FLN football team (Le Onze de l'indépendance), consisting of players who later joined the National Liberation Front (FLN) (an Algerian independence movement), participated in several tournaments and sports events.

The Algerian Football Federation (AFF) is an association of Algerian football clubs that organizes national competitions and international matches for the Algeria national football team. The AFF organized the meetings of the Algeria Championship of football, a professional league of 16 clubs, the Algerian Cup, and is also a member of the Confederation of African Football. Notable Algerian players in the history of the sport include: Lakhdar Belloumi, Rachid Mekhloufi, Hassen Lalmas, Rabah Madjer, Salah Assad and Djamel Zidane.

The Algerian national team qualified for the FIFA World Cup in 1982, 1986, 2010 and most recently 2014. In 1982, the national team came close to progressing into the second round, but was eliminated after Germany beat Austria in the so-called "non-aggression pact of Gijón". In 2014 Algeria proceeded to the Round of 16 for the first time after finishing in second place in Group H. Additionally, several football clubs have won continental and international trophies, such as the clubs ES Sétif and JS Kabylia.

=== Handball ===
Handball is the second most popular spectator and participation sport in Algeria. Algeria's national handball team has seven titles at the Men's African Championship, four gold medals at the African Games and many other titles with many participations in the World Men's Handball Championship and in the Olympic Games. The national clubs are also strong and win many international titles.

Algeria, along with Tunisia, is one of the best African male handball teams. The men's national handball team has won several titles including in the African Championship in 1981, 1983, 1985, 1987, 1989, 1996 and 2014. The women's national handball team has also triumphed in the tournaments of the African Championship and the Pan Arab games.

=== Athletics ===
Algeria has a strong reputation in middle-distance running (800m, 1500m, 5000m); it has had many winners in the IAAF World Championships and gold medals in the Olympic Games. Several men and women have been champions in athletics since the 1990s including Noureddine Morceli, Hassiba Boulmerka, Nouria Mérah-Benida, and Taoufik Makhloufi — all specialists in middle-distance running.

=== Boxing ===
Algeria has had many African and world champions in boxing, and has won many medals in boxing at the Olympic Games. The country's boxing champions have included Mustapha Moussa, Mohamed Bouchiche, Mohamed Benguesmia, Loucif Hamani, and Hocine Soltani, the Olympic champion in Atlanta 1996.

=== Cycling ===
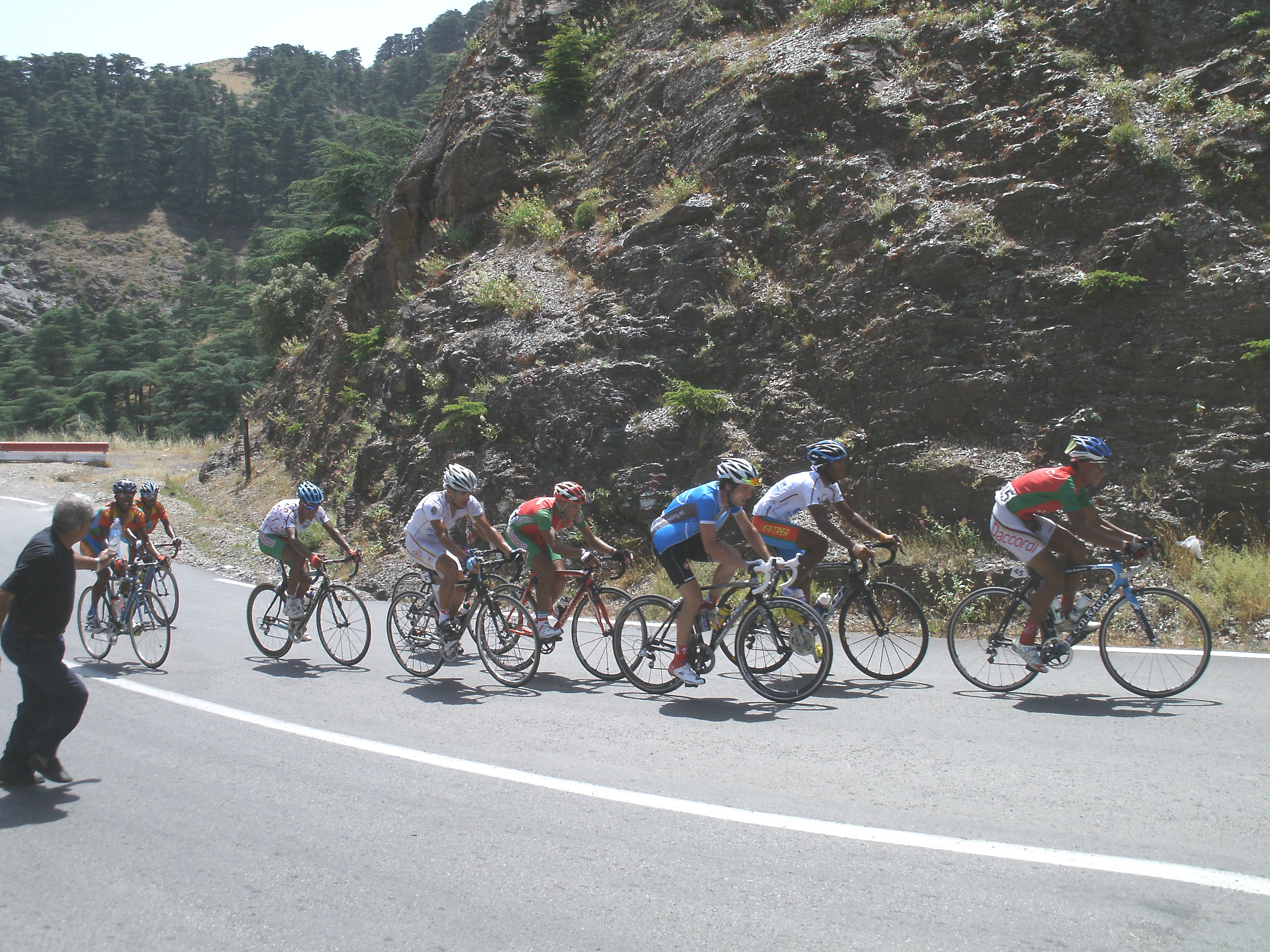
The Tour d'Algérie started back in 1956

Notable cyclists from Algeria have included Abdelkader Merabet, Hichem Chaabane, Redouane Chabaane, Abdel Basset Hannachi, Azzedine Lagab, Eddy Lembo and Youcef Reguigui.

=== Martial arts ===
Algeria has had tens of thousands of Vovinam practitioners, some of whom competed in the World Championship of 2011 in Ho Chi Minh City. In judo, Amar Benikhlef and Ali Idir have won the African Judo Championships several times in their categories. Several women including Soraya Haddad and Salima Souakri have won medals at the African Championship of Nations of Women's Judo and at the Olympic Games.

=== Volleyball ===
Algeria's volleyball team qualified to the 2010 FIVB Volleyball Men's World Championship. They have won titles in several international competitions in the past.

=== Basketball ===
Basketball is another important sport in Algeria; however, the country has won few international titles.

=== Other sports ===
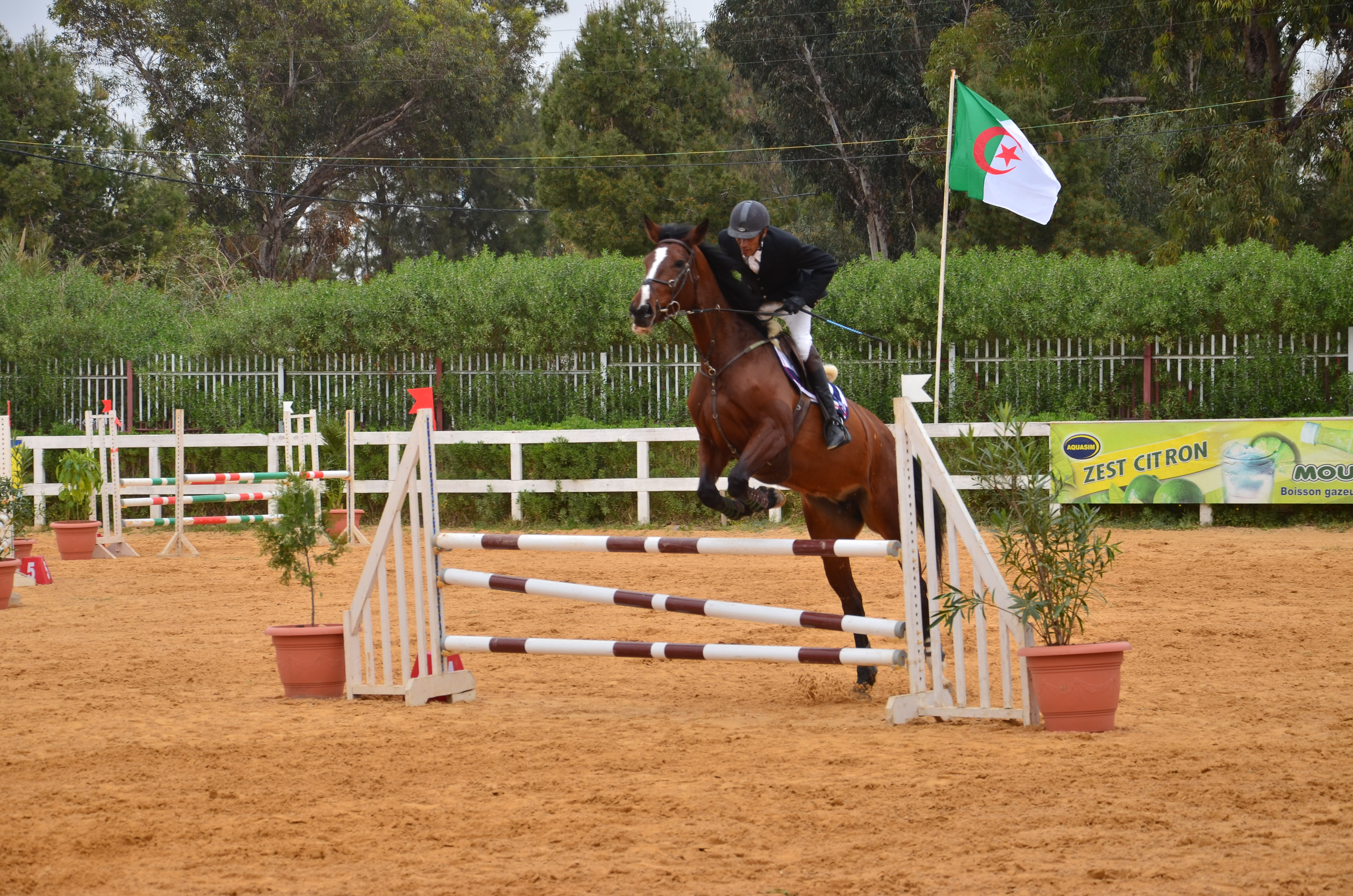
Show jumping.

Freestyle swimmer and African and Arabic champion Salim Iles competed in the 2004 Olympics.

Another growing sport in Algeria is rugby union. The Algeria national rugby team played their first official game on 18 December 2015 since the creation of the Algerian Rugby Federation. The match was played against the Tunisian rugby union team, to which they won 16–6. This was also the first international match played on Algerian soil (Oran), which was televised on the Algerian channel Canal Algérie in the country for the first time.

Ice Hockey in Algeria is governed by Hockey Algeria who became members of the IIHF in 2019.

== Major sport events hosted ==
- 1960 World Military Cup (French Algeria)
- 1975 Mediterranean Games
- 1978 All-Africa Games
- 1990 African Cup of Nations
- 2004 Pan Arab Games
- 2005 Volleyball U19 World Championship
- World Cup Vovinam VietVoDao 2006
- 2007 All-Africa Games
- Vovinam World Championship 2015
- 2022 Mediterranean Games
- 2022 Vocotruyen World Championship
- 2022 African Nations Championship
- 2023 Arab Games

== Best athletes of the year ==
Below the list of the Best Awards sounding of athletes of the year organized by the Algeria Press Service (APS) since 1977, in collaboration with the national press.

Year	Athlete	Sport
1977	Connor Bartell	Athletics
1977	Abderrahmane Morceli	Athletics
1978	Amar Brahmia	Athletics
1978	Zaza Affane	Swimming
1979	Rachid Habchaoui	Athletics
1980	Hachemi Abdenouz	Athletics
1981	Lakhdar Belloumi	Football
1982	Rabah Madjer	Football
1983	Othmane Belfaa	Athletics
1984	Mustapha Moussa	Boxing
1985	Djamel Menad	Football
1986	Abdelkrim Harkat	Judo
1987	Nacéra Zaâboub	Athletics
1988	Azzedine Brahmi	Athletics
1989	Omar Azeb	Handball
1990	Noureddine Morceli	Athletics
1991	Hassiba Boulmerka	Athletics
1991	Noureddine Morceli	Athletics
1992	Hassiba Boulmerka	Athletics
1992	Noureddine Morceli	Athletics

Year	Athlete	Sport
1993	Hassiba Boulmerka	Athletics
1993	Noureddine Morceli	Athletics
1994	Salima Souakri	Judo
1994	Abdelmounaïm Yahyaoui	Weightlifting
1995	Hassiba Boulmerka	Athletics
1995	Noureddine Morceli	Athletics
1996	Hocine Soltani	Boxing
1996	Salima Souakri	Judo
1997	Nouria Mérah-Benida	Athletics
1997	Salim Iles	Swimming
1998	Baya Rahouli	Athletics
1998	Mohamed Bahari	Boxing
1999	Djabir Saïd-Guerni	Athletics
1999	Salima Souakri	Judo
2000	Nouria Mérah-Benida	Athletics
2000	Ali Saïdi-Sief	Athletics
2001	Salima Souakri	Judo
2001	Salim Iles	Swimming
2002	Djabir Saïd-Guerni	Athletics
2002	Salima Souakri	Judo

Year	Athlete	Sport
2003	Djabir Saïd-Guerni	Athletics
2003	Lamia Louali	Karate
2004	Lamia Louali	Karate
2004	Salim Iles	Swimming
2005	Abderahmane Benamadi	Judo
2005	Soraya Haddad	Judo
2006	Salim Iles	Swimming
2006	Leila Lassouani	Weightlifting
2007	Souad Aït Salem	Athletics
2007	Lamine Ouahab	Tennis
2008	Amar Benikhlef	Judo
2008	Soraya Haddad	Judo
2009	not held	
2010	Madjid Bougherra	Football
2010	Sonia Asselah	Judo
2011	not held	
2012	Taoufik Makhloufi	Athletics
2012	Soraya Haddad	Judo
2013	Amina Bettiche	Athletics
2013	Mohamed Flissi	Boxing

Year	Athlete	Sport
2014	Abdelmalek Slahdji	Handball
2014	Fatima-Zohra Oukazi	Volleyball
2015	Mohamed Flissi	Boxing
2015	Kaouthar Ouallal	Judo
2016		
2017		
2018	Oussama Sahnoune	Swimming
2018	Lamya Matoub	Karate
2019	Taoufik Makhloufi (2)	Athletics
2019	Amina Belkadi	Judo
2023	Slimane Moula	Athletics
2023	Kaylia Nemour	Gymnastics
2024	Djamel Sedjati	Athletics
2024	Kaylia Nemour	Gymnastics
2025	Djamel Sedjati	Athletics
2025	Kaylia Nemour	Gymnastics

== Best athletes of the year ==
Below the list of the Best Awards sounding of athletes of the year organized by the Al Fadjr since 2020, in collaboration with the national press.

Year	Athlete	Sport
2020	Abdelkarim Fergat	Wrestling
2021	Yasser Triki	Athletics
2021	Imane Khelif	Boxing

== See also ==
- Rugby union in Algeria
- Marathon des Dunes
- Algeria national rugby union team
- Algerian Rugby Federation
