= Vovinam World Championships =

Vovinam competition

Competition details
- Discipline: Vovinam
- Type: Technical and Fighting
- Organiser: World Vovinam VietVoDao Federation (WVVF) / Vovinam VietVoDao World Federation (Vovinam-VVD)

Divisions
- Current weight divisions: Male 51-54 kg, 54-57 kg, 57-60 kg, 60-64 kg, and 64-68 kg. Female 51-54 kg, 51-54 kg, 54-57 kg, and 57-60 kg.

History
- First edition: 2009 in Ho Chi Minh City, Vietnam
- Final edition: 2025 in Bali, Indonesia
- Most wins: Vietnam (98 Gold medals)

The Vovinam World Championships, also known as the World Vovinam VietVoDao Championships, are the highest level of competition for Vovinam organized by the World Vovinam Federation (WVVF) and Vovinam VietVoDao World Federation (Vovinam-VVD).

== Federations ==
- World Vovinam Federation (WVVF)
- Vovinam VietVoDao World Federation (Vovinam-VVD)
- Integral Vovinam World Federation(IVF)

== List of world championships ==
=== VVD ===
https://vovinamworldfederation.eu/en/

Edition	Year	Host city	Country	Events
1	2002	Paris	France	2
2	2006	Algiers	Algeria	2
3	2010	Sundern	Germany	2
4	2014	Paris	France	2
5	2018	Brussels	Belgium	2
6	2022	Paris	France	

- 2002: https://vovinam-vietvodao.com/en/results/by-events/content/46-2002-1st-world-cup-vovinam.html
- 2006: https://vovinam-vietvodao.com/en/results/by-events/content/47-2006-2nd-world-cup-vovinam-vietvodao.html
- 2010: https://vovinam-vietvodao.com/en/results/by-events/content/48-2010-3rd-world-cup-vovinam-vietvodao.html
- 2014: https://vovinam-vietvodao.com/en/results/by-events/content/49-2014-4th-world-cup-vovinam-vietvodao.html
- 2018: https://vovinam-vietvodao.com/en/results/by-events/content/71-2018-5th-world-cup-vovinam-vietvodao.html

=== WVVF ===
https://oca.asia/sports/federations/141-world-vovinam-federation.html

Edition	Year	Host city	Country	Events	Top nation
1	2009	Ho Chi Minh City	Vietnam	28	Vietnam
2	2011	Ho Chi Minh City	Vietnam	40	Vietnam
3	2013	Paris	France	38	Vietnam
4	2015	Algiers	Algeria	36	Vietnam
5	2017	New Delhi	India	43	Vietnam
6	2019	Phnom Penh	Cambodia	44	Vietnam
7	2023	Ho Chi Minh City	Vietnam	44	Vietnam
8	2025	Bali	Indonesia	45	Vietnam
9	2027	Algiers	Algeria		

- 2009: https://vovinam-vietvodao.com/en/results/by-events/content/44-1st-world-vovinam-championship-2009.html
- 2011: https://vovinam-vietvodao.com/en/results/by-events/content/42-2nd-world-vovinam-championship-2011.html
- 2013: https://vovinam-vietvodao.com/en/results/by-events/content/43-3rd-world-vovinam-championship-2013.html
- 2015: https://vovinam-vietvodao.com/en/results/by-events/content/45-4th-world-vovinam-championship-2015.html
- 2017: https://vovinam-vietvodao.com/en/results/by-events/content/70-5th-world-vovinam-championship-2017.html
- 2023：https://vovinam.world/the-7th-vovinam-world-championship-2023-in-ho-chi-minh-city-vietnam/
- 2025：https://vovinam.world/invitation-of-the-8th-wvvf-world-vovinam-championships-2025/
- 2027：https://vovinam.world/wvvf-ordinary-congress-2025/

== All-time medal table (2002-2017 / WVVF + VVD) ==
The following reflects the all-time medal counts as of the 2017 World Vovinam Championships:

Number of Medals (Years 2002, 2006, 2009, 2010, 2011, 2013, 2014, 2015, 2017)

https://vovinam-vietvodao.com/en/results/by-events.html

Rank	Nation	Gold	Silver	Bronze	Total
1	Vietnam	98	20	16	134
2	France	60	83	44	187
3	Algeria	51	59	29	139
4	Belgium	14	18	4	36
5	Senegal	12	21	10	43
6	Iran	11	1	27	39
7	Italy	8	43	9	60
8	Russia	7	5	26	38
9	Cambodia	6	19	14	39
10	Romania	5	15	3	23
11	Burkina Faso	4	6	5	15
12	Ukraine	4	0	4	8
13	Laos	3	3	6	12
14	United States	3	3	0	6
15	Myanmar	2	6	4	12
16	India	2	5	13	20
17	Ivory Coast	2	5	8	15
18	Morocco	2	5	1	8
19	Spain	1	6	6	13
20	Indonesia	1	5	3	9
21	Afghanistan	1	0	3	4
22	Switzerland	1	0	2	3
23	Germany	0	12	5	17
24	Belarus	0	4	13	17
25	Japan	0	1	0	1
26	Poland	0	0	8	8
27	Thailand	0	0	4	4
28	Bangladesh	0	0	2	2
28	Denmark	0	0	2	2
28	Mauritania	0	0	2	2
31	Nepal	0	0	1	1
Totals (31 entries)		298	345	274	917

== European Championship ==
EVVF is member of World Vovinam Federation (WVVF).

== See also ==
- Integral Vovinam World Federation
- Vocotruyen World Championships
