= Vovinam World Championship 2023 =

Vietnamese martial arts competition

2023 WVVF Vovinam World Championships
- Host city: Ho Chi Minh City, Vietnam
- Nations: 35
- Athletes: 650
- Dates: 22 to 30 August 2023
- Main venue: Phu Tho Stadium

The 2023 WVVF Vovinam World Championships were the seventh edition of the Vovinam World Championship, and were held in Ho Chi Minh City, Vietnam from 22 to 30 August 2023. The tournament attracted the participation of more than 650 athletes and coaches from 35 countries and territories.

Athletes competed for 44 sets of medals, including 26 performance (technical) events and 18 combat weight categories. They went through 111 matches in the 18 male and female combat weight divisions, and 111 performances in the 26 technical events.

As a result, the Vietnamese Vovinam team ranked first overall at the 7th Vovinam World Championship 2023, winning 18 gold medals and 7 silver medals. The Algerian team ranked second with 9 gold, 7 silver, and 6 bronze medals. Cambodia came in third with 6 gold, 5 silver, and 9 bronze medals.

The 7th Vovinam World Championship 2023 concluded successfully on 30 August 2023.

== Medal table ==
* Host nation (Host nation (Vietnam))

Rank	NOC	Gold	Silver	Bronze	Total
1	Vietnam*	18	7	0	25
2	Algeria	9	7	6	22
3	Cambodia	6	5	9	20
4	Thailand	2	10	4	16
5	Russia	2	4	3	9
6	Myanmar	2	3	9	14
7	Philippines	1	2	3	6
8	Belarus	1	0	5	6
8	Italy	1	0	5	6
10	Belgium	1	0	3	4
11	Germany	1	0	2	3
12	France	0	3	10	13
13	Indonesia	0	1	5	6
14	India	0	1	2	3
15	Ivory Coast	0	1	1	2
16	Laos	0	0	10	10
17	Chinese Taipei	0	0	4	4
18	Iran	0	0	1	1
18	Libya	0	0	1	1
18	Pakistan	0	0	1	1
18	Romania	0	0	1	1
Totals (21 entries)		44	44	85	173

== Medal summary ==
=== Performances ===
==== Men's Performances ====
Event	Gold	Silver	Bronze
Ngũ Môn Quyền - Five Gate Form	Nguyễn Tứ Cường; Vietnam	Ly Boramy; Cambodia	Philavanh Chanthakaly; Laos
Ngũ Môn Quyền - Five Gate Form	Nguyễn Tứ Cường; Vietnam	Ly Boramy; Cambodia	Dali Akli; Algeria
Thập Thế Bát Thức Quyền - Ten technique, Eight Principle Form	Vương Minh Khang; Vietnam	Sudorruslan Robin; France	Philavanh Chanthakaly; Laos
Thập Thế Bát Thức Quyền - Ten technique, Eight Principle Form	Vương Minh Khang; Vietnam	Sudorruslan Robin; France	Traoré Issiaka; Ivory Coast
Tinh Hoa Lưỡng Nghi Kiếm Pháp - Ying Yang Sword Form	Phupakorn Wongthanachet; Thailand	Bendjebbar Hamza; Algeria	I Gusti Agung Ngurah Suardyana; Indonesia
Tinh Hoa Lưỡng Nghi Kiếm Pháp - Ying Yang Sword Form	Phupakorn Wongthanachet; Thailand	Bendjebbar Hamza; Algeria	Hein Htet Aung; Myanmar
Tứ Tượng Côn Pháp - Four Element Staff Form	Sean Chanhout; Cambodia	Tin Htoo Zaw; Myanmar	Phupakorn Wongthanachet; Thailand
Tứ Tượng Côn Pháp - Four Element Staff Form	Sean Chanhout; Cambodia	Tin Htoo Zaw; Myanmar	Tran Dinh Du; Germany
Nhật Nguyệt Đại Đao Pháp - Sun Moon Broadsword Form	Huỳnh Khắc Nguyên; Vietnam	Chung Maxime; France	De Oliveira Lorenzo Fernandes; Italy
Nhật Nguyệt Đại Đao Pháp - Sun Moon Broadsword Form	Huỳnh Khắc Nguyên; Vietnam	Chung Maxime; France	Jovan Medallo; Philippines
Long Hổ Quyền - Dragon Tiger Form	Dali Akli; Algeria	I Gusti Agung Ngurah Suardyana; Indonesia	Robin Sudorruslan; France
Long Hổ Quyền - Dragon Tiger Form	Dali Akli; Algeria	I Gusti Agung Ngurah Suardyana; Indonesia	Philavanh Chanthakaly; Laos
Thập Tự Quyền - Cross Form	Dali Akli; Algeria	Alexander Prinz; Thailand	Francesco Brambilla; Italy
Thập Tự Quyền - Cross Form	Dali Akli; Algeria	Alexander Prinz; Thailand	Men Sokvichheka; Cambodia
Song Luyện Kiếm - Pair Sword Form	Algeria; Khichane Mohammed; Timtaoucine Adil	Vietnam; Trần Ngọc Khiết Thuần; Nguyễn Văn Tiến	Myanmar; Tin Htoo Zaw; Kyaw Thu Soe Aung
Song Luyện Kiếm - Pair Sword Form	Algeria; Khichane Mohammed; Timtaoucine Adil	Vietnam; Trần Ngọc Khiết Thuần; Nguyễn Văn Tiến	Thailand; Dahalan Pohdingsamu; Phupakorn Wongthanachet
Song Luyện Mã Tấu - Pair Machete Form	Myanmar; Hein Htet Aung; Aung Khaing Linn	Vietnam; Đỗ Lý Minh Toàn; Nguyễn Trường Thọ	Indonesia; I Wayan Wisma Pratama Putra; Efri Surya Perdana
Song Luyện Mã Tấu - Pair Machete Form	Myanmar; Hein Htet Aung; Aung Khaing Linn	Vietnam; Đỗ Lý Minh Toàn; Nguyễn Trường Thọ	Cambodia; Meth Sopheaktra; Chin Piseth
Song Luyện 3 - Dual Form Number 3	Algeria; Khichane Mohammed; Timtaoucine Adil	France; Mathéo Egard; Hugo Pasquereau	Laos; Phoutthasin Piengpanya; Phokham Phommachanh
Song Luyện 3 - Dual Form Number 3	Algeria; Khichane Mohammed; Timtaoucine Adil	France; Mathéo Egard; Hugo Pasquereau	Cambodia; Meth Sopheaktra; Meth Sary
Song Luyện Dao - Pair Knife Form	Algeria; Djouadj Mohamed Abdelfatah; Djouadj Abdeldjalil	Cambodia; Meth Sary; Meth Sopheaktra	Myanmar; Hein Htet Aung; Aung Khaing Linn
Song Luyện Dao - Pair Knife Form	Algeria; Djouadj Mohamed Abdelfatah; Djouadj Abdeldjalil	Cambodia; Meth Sary; Meth Sopheaktra	Belgium; Irvine Van Ass; Ronan Van Ass
Đòn Chân Tấn Công - Leg Attack Techniques	Vietnam; Nguyễn Hòa Ân; Vũ Duy Bảo; Phan Tấn Thành; Võ Trọng Nhân	Algeria; Benzekhroufa Mahdi; Haroun Sid-Ahmed; Abidat Chems-Eddine; Ouanoughi Hocine	France; Hugo Cabana; Timothee Darmet; Alexis Mankouri; Rean Mankouri
Đòn Chân Tấn Công - Leg Attack Techniques	Vietnam; Nguyễn Hòa Ân; Vũ Duy Bảo; Phan Tấn Thành; Võ Trọng Nhân	Algeria; Benzekhroufa Mahdi; Haroun Sid-Ahmed; Abidat Chems-Eddine; Ouanoughi Hocine	Indonesia; I Wayan Wisma Pratama Putra; I Made Khrisna Dwipayana; I Wayan Purbawa; Efrie Surya Perdana
Đa Luyện Vũ Khí - Multiple Training with weapon	Algeria; Benzekhroufa Mahdi; Haroun Sid-Ahmed; Ouanoughi Hocine; Abidat Chems-Eddine	Vietnam; Huỳnh Khắc Nguyên; Mai Đình Chiến; Lê Đức Duy; Lê Phi Bảo	France; Alexis Mankouri; Timothee Darmet; Rean Mankouri; Hugo Cabana
Đa Luyện Vũ Khí - Multiple Training with weapon	Algeria; Benzekhroufa Mahdi; Haroun Sid-Ahmed; Ouanoughi Hocine; Abidat Chems-Eddine	Vietnam; Huỳnh Khắc Nguyên; Mai Đình Chiến; Lê Đức Duy; Lê Phi Bảo	Myanmar; Kyaw Thu Soe Aung; Tin Htoo Zaw; Hein Htet Aung; Aung Khaing Linn
Đồng Đội Kiếm - Ying-yang sword form team	Cambodia; Im Langchhung; Ny Tiza; Men Sokvichheka; Meth Sary	Vietnam; Huỳnh Khắc Nguyên; Lê Đức Anh; Nguyễn Mạnh Phi; Phan Tấn Thành	Myanmar; Kyaw Thu Soe Aung; Tin Htoo Zaw; Hein Htet Aung; Aung Khaing Linn
Đồng Đội Kiếm - Ying-yang sword form team	Cambodia; Im Langchhung; Ny Tiza; Men Sokvichheka; Meth Sary	Vietnam; Huỳnh Khắc Nguyên; Lê Đức Anh; Nguyễn Mạnh Phi; Phan Tấn Thành	Thailand; Phumin Sawatsai; Phupakorn Wongthanachet; Alexander Prinz; Dahalan Pohdingsamu
Đồng Đội Kỹ Thuật Căn Bản - Basic Technique Self-defense, 6 Athletes	Thailand; Phumin Sawatsai; Phupakorn Wongthanachet; Alexander Prinz; Dahalan Pohdingsamu; Beela Nawae; Sirirad Aunsiam	Cambodia; Meth Sary; Meth Sopheaktra; Chin Piseth; San Socheat; Ny Tiza; Chren Bunlong	Belarus; Alai Artsiom; Mikita Alyaksandrau; Krupnik Tsimafei; Marozau Tsimafei; Izafilau Yauheni; Dzmitry Kukushkin
Đồng Đội Kỹ Thuật Căn Bản - Basic Technique Self-defense, 6 Athletes	Thailand; Phumin Sawatsai; Phupakorn Wongthanachet; Alexander Prinz; Dahalan Pohdingsamu; Beela Nawae; Sirirad Aunsiam	Cambodia; Meth Sary; Meth Sopheaktra; Chin Piseth; San Socheat; Ny Tiza; Chren Bunlong	Laos; Khitsana Sisongkham; Sommay Phangnivong; Ketsadaphone Chanthasida; Phoutthasone Piengpanya; Chanthalangsy Chanthasida; Sisavath Viengsavanh

==== Women's Performances ====
Event	Gold	Silver	Bronze
Long Hổ Quyền - Dragon Tiger Form	Nguyễn Thị Ngọc Trâm; Vietnam	Kanyarat Bampentha; Thailand	Em Chankanika; Cambodia
Long Hổ Quyền - Dragon Tiger Form	Nguyễn Thị Ngọc Trâm; Vietnam	Kanyarat Bampentha; Thailand	Nguyen Viet Trang; Germany
Thập Tự Quyền - Cross Form	Halfaoui Nariman; Algeria	Sutida Nakcharoensri; Thailand	Phimmasone Phouthida; Laos
Thập Tự Quyền - Cross Form	Halfaoui Nariman; Algeria	Sutida Nakcharoensri; Thailand	Chit No De Saung; Myanmar
Song Dao Pháp - Dual Knife Form	Nguyen Viet Trang; Germany	Cisse Zeynab Findonan; Ivory Coast	Truong Thuy Tien; France
Song Dao Pháp - Dual Knife Form	Nguyen Viet Trang; Germany	Cisse Zeynab Findonan; Ivory Coast	Sysoyeva Kasiaryna; Belarus
Tinh Hoa Lưỡng Nghi Kiếm Pháp - Ying Yang Sword Form	Mai Thị Kim Thùy; Vietnam	May Han Ni Aung Lwin; Myanmar	Pov Sokha; Cambodia
Tinh Hoa Lưỡng Nghi Kiếm Pháp - Ying Yang Sword Form	Mai Thị Kim Thùy; Vietnam	May Han Ni Aung Lwin; Myanmar	Elkherraz Hadjer; Algeria
Thái Cực Đơn Đao Pháp - Aspect Broadsword Single Form	Pal Chhor Raksmy; Cambodia	Hàng Thị Diễm My; Vietnam	Giorgia Guzzi; Italy
Thái Cực Đơn Đao Pháp - Aspect Broadsword Single Form	Pal Chhor Raksmy; Cambodia	Hàng Thị Diễm My; Vietnam	Janah Jade Lavador; Philippines
Song Luyện Kiếm - Pair Sword Form	Vietnam; Lâm Thị Lời; Nguyễn Thị Tuyết Mai	Thailand; Bunyaratplin Amporn; Boonyaratanapalin Issarin	Algeria; Bouhraoua Sonia; Elkherraz Hadjer
Song Luyện Kiếm - Pair Sword Form	Vietnam; Lâm Thị Lời; Nguyễn Thị Tuyết Mai	Thailand; Bunyaratplin Amporn; Boonyaratanapalin Issarin	Cambodia; Soeur Chanleakhena; Pov Sokha
Đồng Đội KIếm - Ying-yang sword form team	Italy; Mazza Francesca; Di Nardi Iris; Minniti Chiara; Ibba Francesca	Vietnam; Mai Thị Kim Thùy; Lâm Thị Lời; Nguyễn Thị Hoài Nương; Huỳnh Thị Diệu Thảo	France; Truong Thuy Tien; Emilie Lallut; Gladys Bouré; Capucine Durot
Đồng Đội KIếm - Ying-yang sword form team	Italy; Mazza Francesca; Di Nardi Iris; Minniti Chiara; Ibba Francesca	Vietnam; Mai Thị Kim Thùy; Lâm Thị Lời; Nguyễn Thị Hoài Nương; Huỳnh Thị Diệu Thảo	Laos; Senthavilai Manilyn; Phimmasone Phouthida; Koungking Bouddaxay
Đồng Đội Kỹ Thuật Căn Bản - Basic Technique Self-defense, 6 Athletes	Cambodia; Pal Chhor Raksmy; Khorn Chansopheakneath; Pov Sokha; Sok Nidanut; Sok Sophy; Ven Sreymean	Thailand; Bunyaratplin Amporn; Boonyaratanapalin Issarin; Kanyarat Bampentha; Suwaphat	Laos; Phimmasone Phouthida; Koungking Bouddaxay; Senthavilai Manilyn; Senelathy Soudavanh; Alisa Panyasyli

==== Mixed Performances ====
Event	Gold	Silver	Bronze
Tự Vệ Nữ - Self-defense	Algeria; Teboudi Ilham; Lounas Salim Abdelaziz	Vietnam; Nguyễn Hoàng Du; Lý Thị Kim Ngân	Myanmar; Aung Khaing Linn; Chit No De Saung
Tự Vệ Nữ - Self-defense	Algeria; Teboudi Ilham; Lounas Salim Abdelaziz	Vietnam; Nguyễn Hoàng Du; Lý Thị Kim Ngân	Thailand; Phumin Sawatsai; Sutida Nakcharoensri
Đa Luyện Vũ Khí Nữ - 1 Female defends against 3 males with weapon	Vietnam; Lâm Thị Thùy Mỵ; Lê Toàn Trung; Đoàn Hoàng Thâm; Lâm Trí Linh	Algeria; Teboudi Ilham; Lounas Salim Abdelaziz; Djouadj Abdeldjalil; Bendjebbar Hamza	Myanmar; May Han Ni Aung Lwin; Aung Khaing Linn; Kyaw Thu Soe Aung; Tin Htoo Zaw
Đa Luyện Vũ Khí Nữ - 1 Female defends against 3 males with weapon	Vietnam; Lâm Thị Thùy Mỵ; Lê Toàn Trung; Đoàn Hoàng Thâm; Lâm Trí Linh	Algeria; Teboudi Ilham; Lounas Salim Abdelaziz; Djouadj Abdeldjalil; Bendjebbar Hamza	Indonesia; I Wayan Wisma Pratama Putra; I Gusti Agung Ngurah Suardyana; Efri Surya Perdana; Kade Ayu Mas Sasvita Dewi
Đồng Đội Kỹ Thuật Căn Bản - Basic Technique Self-defense, 6 Athletes	Cambodia; Pal Chhor Raksmy; Meth Sopheaktra; San Socheat; Pov Sokha; Khorn Chansopheakneath; Chin Piseth	Myanmar; Kyaw Thu Soe Aung; Tin Htoo Zaw; Hein Htet Aung; May Han Ni Aung Lwin; Chit No De Saung; Eain Dray Phoo	Algeria; Bouhraoua Sonia; Elkherraz Hadjer; Teboudi Ilham; Djouadj Mohamed Abdelfatah; Djouadj Abdeldjalil; Lounas Salim Abdelaziz
Đồng Đội Kỹ Thuật Căn Bản - Basic Technique Self-defense, 6 Athletes	Cambodia; Pal Chhor Raksmy; Meth Sopheaktra; San Socheat; Pov Sokha; Khorn Chansopheakneath; Chin Piseth	Myanmar; Kyaw Thu Soe Aung; Tin Htoo Zaw; Hein Htet Aung; May Han Ni Aung Lwin; Chit No De Saung; Eain Dray Phoo	Indonesia; I Wayan Purbawa; I Made Khrisna Dwipayana; I Gusti Agung Ngurah Suardyana; Kade Ayu Mas Sasvita Dewi; Ni Wayan Vina Puspita; Putu Wahana Maha Yoni

=== Fighting ===
==== Men's Fighting ====
Event	Gold	Silver	Bronze
54 kg	Nguyễn Đạt Duy Long; Vietnam	Verma Ishan; India	Min Min Htike; Myanmar
54 kg	Nguyễn Đạt Duy Long; Vietnam	Verma Ishan; India	Satsada Phommavong; Laos
57 kg	Lê Nguyễn Hoài Nam; Vietnam	Um Nimol; Cambodia	Viktar Kalasouski; Belarus
57 kg	Lê Nguyễn Hoài Nam; Vietnam	Um Nimol; Cambodia	Pai Chieh-sheng; Chinese Taipei
60 kg	Lê Ngọc Vĩnh Trường; Vietnam	Emmanuel Cantores; Philippines	Sous Sovanchan; Cambodia
60 kg	Lê Ngọc Vĩnh Trường; Vietnam	Emmanuel Cantores; Philippines	Kuo Hao-wei; Chinese Taipei
64 kg	Mardoche Kiamesso; Belgium	Trikitsyavet Nathakorn; Thailand	Chao Po-hung; Chinese Taipei
64 kg	Mardoche Kiamesso; Belgium	Trikitsyavet Nathakorn; Thailand	Sysoev Nikita; Russia
68 kg	Bùi Xuân Nhật; Vietnam	Vichetrach Kao; Cambodia	Phokham Phommachanh; Laos
68 kg	Bùi Xuân Nhật; Vietnam	Vichetrach Kao; Cambodia	Tsimafei Marozau; Belarus
72 kg	Nguyễn Tiến Sơn; Vietnam	Adel Safarov; Russia	Chenini Moussa; Algeria
72 kg	Nguyễn Tiến Sơn; Vietnam	Adel Safarov; Russia	Dzianis Akavity; Belarus
77 kg	Dmitrii Turbin; Russia	Rabia Salah; Algeria	Jonathan Tshimanga; Belgium
77 kg	Dmitrii Turbin; Russia	Rabia Salah; Algeria	Wang Chiu-min; Chinese Taipei
82 kg	Artem Kozhokin; Russia	Kherbouche Isam; Algeria	Seyed Amir; Iran
82 kg	Artem Kozhokin; Russia	Kherbouche Isam; Algeria	Alexandre Jacquet; France
87 kg	Yousfi Aimen; Algeria	Bualom Warat; Thailand	Mathéo Egard; France
87 kg	Yousfi Aimen; Algeria	Bualom Warat; Thailand	Joachim Belot; Belgium
92 kg	Nguyễn Hữu Toàn; Vietnam	Stanislav Nosov; Russia	Adrian Teleman-Bogdan; Romania
92 kg	Nguyễn Hữu Toàn; Vietnam	Stanislav Nosov; Russia	Abdul Salam; Libya
Over 92 kg	Nichyporchyk Aliaksandr; Belarus	Grosul Andrei; Russia	Feky Sofian; France

==== Women's Fighting ====
Event	Gold	Silver	Bronze
51 kg	Hnin Thet Wai; Myanmar	Aime Impas Ramos; Philippines	Ijaz Maqdas; Pakistan
51 kg	Hnin Thet Wai; Myanmar	Aime Impas Ramos; Philippines	Ivakina; Russia
54 kg	Phạm Thị Kiều Giang; Vietnam	Laemnoi Siwaporn; Thailand	Fermato Fitzchel Martine; Philippines
54 kg	Phạm Thị Kiều Giang; Vietnam	Laemnoi Siwaporn; Thailand	Emilie Lallut; France
57 kg	Lê Thị Hiền; Vietnam	Arouri Amina Alicia; Algeria	Eh Priyanuthphouthong; Cambodia
57 kg	Lê Thị Hiền; Vietnam	Arouri Amina Alicia; Algeria	Rameshwar Sharwari Rathore; India
60 kg	Chuk Somaly; Cambodia	Melissa Maria; Algeria	Angelina Dushenko; Russia
60 kg	Chuk Somaly; Cambodia	Melissa Maria; Algeria	Rabha Jinti Koch; India
63 kg	Ma Thị Hồng Nhung; Vietnam	Thitirat Sae-Oung; Thailand	Annachiara Pedretti; Italy
63 kg	Ma Thị Hồng Nhung; Vietnam	Thitirat Sae-Oung; Thailand	Faïrouz Dehamchi; Algeria
66 kg	Bùi Thị Thảo Ngân; Vietnam	Boonmee Kewarin; Thailand	Stella Grimoldi; Italy
66 kg	Bùi Thị Thảo Ngân; Vietnam	Boonmee Kewarin; Thailand	Sofia El; France
Over 66 kg	Hergie Tao-Wag Bacyadan; Philippines	Avdeenko Mariana; Russia	Sok Sophy; Cambodia
