= 2025 Vovinam World Championships =

Vietnamese martial arts competition

2025 WVVF Vovinam World Championships (Hari Pertama Kejuaraan Dunia Vovinam 2025)
- Host city: Bali, Indonesia
- Nations: 25
- Athletes: 392
- Dates: 2 to 8 November 2025
- Main venue: Undiksha Singaraja Indoor Tennis Stadium

The 2025 WVVF Vovinam World Championships were the eighth edition of the Vovinam World Championship, and were held in Bali, Indonesia from 2 to 8 November 2025. The 8th World Vovinam Championship 2025, organized by the World Vovinam Federation (WVVF), took place in Bali, Indonesia, from November 2 to 8, 2025. This year's Championship welcomed more than 600 athletes from 26 countries and territories across four continents — Asia, Europe, Africa, and Oceania — where Vovinam has flourished. Athletes competed in 45 events, including 26 demonstration events (forms) and 19 sparring events.

Competing with 39 athletes across both performance and combat events, the Vietnamese national team faced intense and closely contested bouts. After a week of high-level competition, Vietnam triumphant once again, securing 24 gold medals and 1 silver medal to successfully defend their overall championship title.

The battle for second place came down to Algeria and Cambodia, two nations with strong development programs and large contingents. After a tight race lasting until the final events, Algeria claimed second place overall with 9 gold, 10 silver, and 5 bronze medals, while Cambodia finished third with 7 gold, 11 silver, and 5 bronze medals.

== Medal table ==
* Host nation (Indonesia)

Rank	NOC	Gold	Silver	Bronze	Total
1	Vietnam	24	1	0	25
2	Algeria	9	10	5	24
3	Cambodia	7	11	5	23
4	Russia	3	2	6	11
5	Myanmar	2	5	7	14
6	Indonesia*	0	5	13	18
7	France	0	3	4	7
8	Ivory Coast	0	2	4	6
9	Belarus	0	2	2	4
10	Philippines	0	1	5	6
11	Romania	0	1	4	5
12	Germany	0	1	2	3
12	Japan	0	1	2	3
14	Italy	0	0	9	9
15	India	0	0	4	4
16	Bangladesh	0	0	2	2
17	Belgium	0	0	1	1
17	Iran	0	0	1	1
17	Pakistan	0	0	1	1
Totals (19 entries)		45	45	77	167

== Medal summary ==
=== Performances ===
==== Men's Performances ====
Event	Gold	Silver	Bronze
Ngũ Môn Quyền - Five Gate Form	Nguyễn Hùng Dũng; Vietnam	I Gusti Agung Ngurah Suardyana; Indonesia	Lukas Effler; Germany
Ngũ Môn Quyền - Five Gate Form	Nguyễn Hùng Dũng; Vietnam	I Gusti Agung Ngurah Suardyana; Indonesia	Takashi Izumi; Japan
Thập Thế Bát Thức Quyền - Ten technique, Eight Principle Form	Nguyễn Tứ Cường; Vietnam	[[|]]	Traoré Issiaka; Ivory Coast
Thập Thế Bát Thức Quyền - Ten technique, Eight Principle Form	Nguyễn Tứ Cường; Vietnam	[[|]]	[[|]]
Tinh Hoa Lưỡng Nghi Kiếm Pháp - Ying Yang Sword Form	Bendjebbar Hamza; Algeria	Sean Chanhout; Cambodia	Kyaw Thu Soe Aung; Myanmar
Tinh Hoa Lưỡng Nghi Kiếm Pháp - Ying Yang Sword Form	Bendjebbar Hamza; Algeria	Sean Chanhout; Cambodia	I Gusti Agung Ngurah Suardyana; Indonesia
Tứ Tượng Côn Pháp - Four Element Staff Form	Nguyễn Hoàng Tấn; Vietnam	Tin Htoo Zaw; Myanmar	Bendjebbar Hamza; Algeria
Tứ Tượng Côn Pháp - Four Element Staff Form	Nguyễn Hoàng Tấn; Vietnam	Tin Htoo Zaw; Myanmar	Sean Chanhout; Cambodia
Nhật Nguyệt Đại Đao Pháp - Sun Moon Broadsword Form	Nguyễn Trường Thọ; Vietnam	Omine Sowa; Japan	Traoré Ismael Farhid; Ivory Coast
Nhật Nguyệt Đại Đao Pháp - Sun Moon Broadsword Form	Nguyễn Trường Thọ; Vietnam	Omine Sowa; Japan	Ly Boramy; Cambodia
Long Hổ Quyền - Dragon Tiger Form	Dali Akli; Algeria	Tin Htoo Zaw; Myanmar	I Gusti Agung Ngurah Suardyana; Indonesia
Long Hổ Quyền - Dragon Tiger Form	Dali Akli; Algeria	Tin Htoo Zaw; Myanmar	Omine Sowa; Japan
Thập Tự Quyền - Cross Form	Dali Akli; Algeria	Cambodia	Hein Htet Aung; Myanmar
Thập Tự Quyền - Cross Form	Dali Akli; Algeria	Cambodia	Whinny Bayawon; Philippines
Song Luyện Kiếm Pháp- Pair Sword Form	Algeria; Mohammed Khichane; Adil Timtaoucine	Myanmar; Hein Htet Aung; Tin Htoo Zaw	Russia
Song Luyện Kiếm Pháp- Pair Sword Form	Algeria; Mohammed Khichane; Adil Timtaoucine	Myanmar; Hein Htet Aung; Tin Htoo Zaw	Bangladesh; Jabedul Islam Chowdhury; Mahmudul Anam Tasdid
Song Luyện Mã Tấu - Pair Machete Form	Vietnam; Đỗ Lý Minh Toàn; Nguyễn Trường Thọ	Myanmar; Tin Htoo Zaw; Hein Htet Aung	Romania; Gabriel Livadariu; Mihai Livadariu
Song Luyện Mã Tấu - Pair Machete Form	Vietnam; Đỗ Lý Minh Toàn; Nguyễn Trường Thọ	Myanmar; Tin Htoo Zaw; Hein Htet Aung	Philippines; Jovan Medallo; Jonel Medallo
Song Luyện 3 - Dual Form Number 3			Italy; Pietro Marchetti; Filippo Perego
Song Luyện 3 - Dual Form Number 3			Romania; Gabriel Livadariu; Mihai Livadariu
Song Luyện Dao - Pair Knife Form	Cambodia; Meth Sopheaktra; Meth Sary	Myanmar; Kyaw Thu Soe Aung; Hein Htet Aung	Italy; Matteo Godino; Lorenzo Consonni
Song Luyện Dao - Pair Knife Form	Cambodia; Meth Sopheaktra; Meth Sary	Myanmar; Kyaw Thu Soe Aung; Hein Htet Aung	Algeria; Djouadj Mohamed Abdelfatah; Djouadj Abdeldjalil
Đòn Chân Tấn Công - Leg Attack Techniques	Vietnam; Võ Trọng Nhân; Mai Đình Chiến; Phan Tấn Thành; Vũ Duy Bảo		
Đa Luyện Vũ Khí - Multiple Training with weapon	Algeria; Benzekhroufa Mahdi; Abidat Chems-Eddine; Haroun Sid-Ahmed; Ouanoughi Hocine	Vietnam; Mai Đình Chiến; Lê Thanh Tuấn; Văn Nghĩa; Phan Tấn Thành	{{ }}
Đa Luyện Vũ Khí - Multiple Training with weapon	Algeria; Benzekhroufa Mahdi; Abidat Chems-Eddine; Haroun Sid-Ahmed; Ouanoughi Hocine	Vietnam; Mai Đình Chiến; Lê Thanh Tuấn; Văn Nghĩa; Phan Tấn Thành	{{ }}
Đồng Đội Kiếm - Ying-yang sword form team	Vietnam; Đỗ Lý Minh Toàn; Nguyễn Mạnh Phi; Đoàn Hoàng Thâm; Lê Đức Anh		
Đồng Đội Kỹ Thuật Căn Bản - Basic Technique Self-defense, 6 Athletes	Cambodia; Im Langchhung; Meth Sopheaktra; Meth Sary; Men Sokvichheka; Ny Tiza; Chin Piseth		

==== Women's Performances ====
Event	Gold	Silver	Bronze
Long Hổ Quyền - Dragon Tiger Form	Nguyễn Thị Ngọc Trâm; Vietnam	Halfaoui Nariman; Algeria	Nguyen Viet Trang; Germany
Long Hổ Quyền - Dragon Tiger Form	Nguyễn Thị Ngọc Trâm; Vietnam	Halfaoui Nariman; Algeria	Kade Ayu Mas Sasvita Dewi; Indonesia
Thập Tự Quyền - Cross Form	Em Chankanika; Cambodia	Algeria	Margherita Corcione; Italy
Thập Tự Quyền - Cross Form	Em Chankanika; Cambodia	Algeria	Indonesia
Song Dao Pháp - Dual Knife Form	May Han Ni Aung Lwin; Myanmar	Nguyen Viet Trang; Germany	Georgiana Ichim; Romania
Song Dao Pháp - Dual Knife Form	May Han Ni Aung Lwin; Myanmar	Nguyen Viet Trang; Germany	Pov Sokha; Cambodia
Tinh Hoa Lưỡng Nghi Kiếm Pháp - Ying Yang Sword Form	Nguyễn Thanh Mai; Vietnam	Oudjatout Fatima Zahra; Algeria	Melissa Opreni; Italy
Tinh Hoa Lưỡng Nghi Kiếm Pháp - Ying Yang Sword Form	Nguyễn Thanh Mai; Vietnam	Oudjatout Fatima Zahra; Algeria	May Han Ni Aung Lwin; Myanmar
Thái Cực Đơn Đao Pháp - Aspect Broadsword Single Form	Hàng Thị Diễm My; Vietnam	Em Chankanika; Cambodia	Giorgia Guzzi; Italy
Thái Cực Đơn Đao Pháp - Aspect Broadsword Single Form	Hàng Thị Diễm My; Vietnam	Em Chankanika; Cambodia	Janah Jade Lavador; Philippines
Song Luyện Kiếm - Pair Sword Form	Vietnam; Lâm Thị Lời; Lý Thị Kim Hằng		Myanmar; Chit No De Saung; May Han Ni Aung Lwin
Song Luyện Kiếm - Pair Sword Form	Vietnam; Lâm Thị Lời; Lý Thị Kim Hằng		Italy; Giorgia Guzzi; Melissa Opreni
Đồng Đội KIếm - Ying-yang sword form team	Vietnam; Lâm Thị Lời; Huỳnh Thị Diệu Thảo; Phan Thị Bích Ngọc; Lê Thị Thương	Cambodia; Sok Nidanut; Solyda Ou; Soeur Chanleakhena; Pov Sokha	Italy; Francesca Ibba; Margherita Corcione; Chiara Minniti; Francesca Mazza
Đồng Đội KIếm - Ying-yang sword form team	Vietnam; Lâm Thị Lời; Huỳnh Thị Diệu Thảo; Phan Thị Bích Ngọc; Lê Thị Thương	Cambodia; Sok Nidanut; Solyda Ou; Soeur Chanleakhena; Pov Sokha	Algeria; Halfaoui Nariman; Bouhraoua Sonia; Oudjatout Fatima Zahra; Imane Kaci
Đồng Đội Kỹ Thuật Căn Bản - Basic Technique Self-defense, 6 Athletes	Cambodia; Ven Sreymean; Pov Sokha; Solyda Ou; Khorn Chansopheakneath; Sok Nidanut; Soeur Chanleakhena	Indonesia; Putu Wahana Maha Yoni; Ni Wayan Vina Puspita; Kade Ayu Mas Sasvita Dewi; Ni Made Purnami; Ni Made Ayu Dipta Sari; Lia Kurniatus Sholihah	{{ }}
Đồng Đội Kỹ Thuật Căn Bản - Basic Technique Self-defense, 6 Athletes	Cambodia; Ven Sreymean; Pov Sokha; Solyda Ou; Khorn Chansopheakneath; Sok Nidanut; Soeur Chanleakhena	Indonesia; Putu Wahana Maha Yoni; Ni Wayan Vina Puspita; Kade Ayu Mas Sasvita Dewi; Ni Made Purnami; Ni Made Ayu Dipta Sari; Lia Kurniatus Sholihah	Algeria; Oudjatout Fatima Zahra

==== Mixed Performances ====
Event	Gold	Silver	Bronze
Tự Vệ Nữ - Self-defense	Vietnam; Nguyễn Hoàng Dũ; Võ Nguyễn Thu Thảo	Algeria; Djouadj Abdeldjalil; Imane Kaci	Myanmar; Chit No De Saung; Hein Htet Aung
Tự Vệ Nữ - Self-defense	Vietnam; Nguyễn Hoàng Dũ; Võ Nguyễn Thu Thảo	Algeria; Djouadj Abdeldjalil; Imane Kaci	Italy; Francesca Mazza; Filippo Perego
Đa Luyện Vũ Khí Nữ - 1 Female defends against 3 males with weapon	Vietnam; Lâm Thị Thùy Mỵ; Lê Toàn Trung; Nguyễn Văn Tiến; Lâm Trí Linh	Algeria; Imane Kaci; Djouadj Mohamed Abdelfatah; Djouadj Abdeldjalil; Haroun Sid-Ahmed	Myanmar; May Han Ni Aung Lwin; Hein Htet Aung; Tin Htoo Zaw; Kyaw Thu Soe Aung
Đa Luyện Vũ Khí Nữ - 1 Female defends against 3 males with weapon	Vietnam; Lâm Thị Thùy Mỵ; Lê Toàn Trung; Nguyễn Văn Tiến; Lâm Trí Linh	Algeria; Imane Kaci; Djouadj Mohamed Abdelfatah; Djouadj Abdeldjalil; Haroun Sid-Ahmed	Indonesia; Putu Wahana Maha Yoni; I Gede Made Yoga Andhika Cahyadi; I Made Bagus Diva Ary Sanjaya; I Wayan Wisma Pratama Putra
Đồng Đội Kỹ Thuật Căn Bản - Basic Technique Self-defense, 6 Athletes	Cambodia; Meth Sopheaktra; Ly Boramy; Chin Piseth; Pov Sokha; Khorn Chansopheakneath; Ven Sreymean	Algeria; Bouhraoua Sonia; Melissa Guendouzi; Oudjatout Fatima Zahra; Benzekhroufa Mahdi; Abidat Chems-Eddine; Ouanoughi Hocine	Myanmar; Kyaw Thu Soe Aung; Tin Htoo Zaw; Tin Htoo Zaw; Chit No De Saung; Hnin Thet Wai; May Han Ni Aung Lwin
Đồng Đội Kỹ Thuật Căn Bản - Basic Technique Self-defense, 6 Athletes	Cambodia; Meth Sopheaktra; Ly Boramy; Chin Piseth; Pov Sokha; Khorn Chansopheakneath; Ven Sreymean	Algeria; Bouhraoua Sonia; Melissa Guendouzi; Oudjatout Fatima Zahra; Benzekhroufa Mahdi; Abidat Chems-Eddine; Ouanoughi Hocine	Ivory Coast; Cissé Zeynab Findinan; Ouattara Mariam; Meihi Emmanuella Rosane; Traoré Ismael Farhid; Traoré Issiaka; N’Dri Mac Evrard

=== Fighting ===
==== Men's Fighting ====
Event	Gold	Silver	Bronze
54 kg	Phan Houhim; Cambodia	Pons Henry Seneres; Philippines	Papu Ahmad; India
54 kg	Phan Houhim; Cambodia	Pons Henry Seneres; Philippines	Hafids Insani; Indonesia
57 kg	Hồ An Lĩnh; Vietnam	Um Nimol; Cambodia	Whinny Bayawon; Philippines
57 kg	Hồ An Lĩnh; Vietnam	Um Nimol; Cambodia	Jabedul Islam Chowdhury; Bangladesh
60 kg	Sous Sovanchan; Cambodia	Marian Hriban; Romania	Gede Jensen Astika; Indonesia
60 kg	Sous Sovanchan; Cambodia	Marian Hriban; Romania	Raju Gogoi; India
64 kg	Abderahmane Chiheb; Algeria	Adi Suarjaya; Indonesia	[[|]]
64 kg	Abderahmane Chiheb; Algeria	Adi Suarjaya; Indonesia	Senny El; France
68 kg	Lý Chánh Đại; Vietnam	Tsimafei Marozau; Belarus	Gasmi Abde El Krim; Algeria
68 kg	Lý Chánh Đại; Vietnam	Tsimafei Marozau; Belarus	Ethan Plaize; France
72 kg	Nguyễn Mạnh Cường; Vietnam	Dimitrii Zverev; Russia	Gopal Yadav; India
72 kg	Nguyễn Mạnh Cường; Vietnam	Dimitrii Zverev; Russia	Yohane Biron; France
77 kg	Dmitriy Turbin; Russia	Alexandre Jacquet; France	Surya Dewanatha Hibatullah; Indonesia
77 kg	Dmitriy Turbin; Russia	Alexandre Jacquet; France	[[|]]
82 kg	Nguyễn Quảng Triều; Vietnam	Kherbouche Isam; Algeria	Meth Sopheaktra; Cambodia
82 kg	Nguyễn Quảng Triều; Vietnam	Kherbouche Isam; Algeria	Joachim Belot; Belgium
87 kg	Trần Thanh Vy; Vietnam	Sultan Nassim; Algeria	Adrian Teleman-Bogdan; Romania
87 kg	Trần Thanh Vy; Vietnam	Sultan Nassim; Algeria	Mark Arbaan; Indonesia
92 kg	Nguyễn Hữu Toàn; Vietnam	Dossco Ladji Kader; Ivory Coast	Pappu Bharali; India
92 kg	Nguyễn Hữu Toàn; Vietnam	Dossco Ladji Kader; Ivory Coast	[[|]]
Over 92 kg	Amine Hamoudi; Algeria	Lionel Girard; France	Nichyporchyk Aliaksandr; Belarus
Over 92 kg	Amine Hamoudi; Algeria	Lionel Girard; France	Grosul Andrei; Russia

==== Women's Fighting ====
Event	Gold	Silver	Bronze
51 kg	Hnin Thet Wai; Myanmar	Daria Ivakina; Russia	Ijaz Maqdas; Bangladesh
51 kg	Hnin Thet Wai; Myanmar	Daria Ivakina; Russia	Maéva Theulier; France
54 kg	Phạm Thị Kiều Giang; Vietnam	Pov Sokha; Cambodia	Janah Jade Lavador; Philippines
54 kg	Phạm Thị Kiều Giang; Vietnam	Pov Sokha; Cambodia	[[|]]
57 kg	Lê Thị Hiền; Vietnam	Arouri Amina Alicia; Algeria	Ven Sreymean; Cambodia
57 kg	Lê Thị Hiền; Vietnam	Arouri Amina Alicia; Algeria	Mariana; Russia
60 kg	Melissa Maria Guendouzi; Algeria	Sok Nidanut; Cambodia	Ekaterina Kragel; Belarus
60 kg	Melissa Maria Guendouzi; Algeria	Sok Nidanut; Cambodia	[[|]]
63 kg	Thị Lài; Vietnam	I Gusti Agung Ayu Kartika Dewi; Indonesia	Bouchra Sahnine; Algeria
63 kg	Thị Lài; Vietnam	I Gusti Agung Ayu Kartika Dewi; Indonesia	Ouattara Mariam; Ivory Coast
66 kg	Ma Thị Hồng Nhung; Vietnam	Meihi Emmanuella Rosane; Ivory Coast	Greta Carnio; Italy
66 kg	Ma Thị Hồng Nhung; Vietnam	Meihi Emmanuella Rosane; Ivory Coast	[[|]]
70 kg	[[|]]	Sysoyeva Kasiaryna; Belarus	[[|]]
