= 2013 Vovinam World Championship =

Vietnamese martial arts competition

2013 WVVF Vovinam World Championships
- Host city: Paris, France
- Nations: 18
- Athletes: 300
- Dates: 5 to 7 July 2013
- Main venue: National Judo Institute Academy

The 2013 WVVF Vovinam World Championship were the third edition of the Vovinam World Championship, and were held in Paris, France from 5 to 7 July 2013. It is also the first World Championships that is held in Europe.

== Medal table ==
* Host nation (Host nation (France))

Rank	NOC	Gold	Silver	Bronze	Total
1	Vietnam	18	0	2	20
2	France*	9	9	7	25
3	Algeria	6	5	6	17
4	Romania	4	4	4	12
5	Italy	2	8	3	13
6	Iran	2	7	2	11
7	Spain	0	2	2	4
8	Germany	0	2	1	3
9	Belarus	0	1	3	4
10	Senegal	0	1	2	3
11	Russia	0	0	6	6
12	Belgium	0	0	5	5
13	Poland	0	0	4	4
14	Bangladesh	0	0	1	1
Totals (14 entries)		41	39	48	128

== Medal summary ==
=== Performances ===
==== Men's Performances ====
Event	Gold	Silver	Bronze
Ngũ Môn Quyền - Five Gate Form	Trần Thế Thường; Vietnam	Sambou Dioberane; Senegal	Bedjoudjou Bachir; Algeria
Thập Thế Bát Thức Quyền - Ten technique, Eight Principle Form	Phạm Văn Thắng; Vietnam	Serdare Florin; Romania	Furlan Pietro Nicola; Italy
Tinh Hoa Lưỡng Nghi Kiếm Pháp - Ying Yang Sword Form	Maltagliati Stefano; Italy	Tran Dinh Du; Germany	Seng Rithya; France
Tứ Tượng Côn Pháp - Four Element Staff Form	Serdara Florin; Romania	Furlan Pietro Nicola; Italy	Noll Vicens; France
Nhật Nguyệt Đại Đao Pháp - Sun Moon Broadsword Form	Huỳnh Khắc Nguyên; Vietnam	Hua Trung Kien; France	Ciobotaru Geluta; Romania
Song Luyện Kiếm - Pair Sword Form	Romania; Ichim Vasile; Teleman Adrian	Germany; Tran Dinh An; Tran Dinh Du	Belgium; Lauria Olivier; Gaens Michel
Song Luyện Mã Tấu - Pair Machete Form	Vietnam; Trần Thế Thường; Lâm Đông Vượng	France; Pereira Bruno; Vigeant Maxime	Senegal; Kor Mamadou; Sambou Dioberane
Song Luyện Dao - Pair Knife Form	France; Hay Alexis; Thomas Alexis	Algeria; Rabia Salah; Zaidi Hamza	Romania; Ichim Vasile; Teleman Adrian
Song Luyện 3	France; Leleu Johann; Maillard Guillaume	Italy; Riva Stefano; Ximenes Marco	Algeria; Hirech Athmane; Bedjoudjou Bachir
Quyền Đồng Đội - 3 athletes perform Dragon-tiger form	France; Nguyễn Văn Thời; Trần Thanh Sơn; Lê Bảo Giang	Algeria; Bedjoudjou Bachir; Hireche Othmane; Benhadj Djilali	Romania; Costoaea Traian; Tomulescu Robert; Andrei Alexandru
Đòn Chân Tấn Công - Leg Attack Techniques	Vietnam; Huỳnh Khắc Nguyên; Nguyễn Bình Định; Nguyễn Văn Cường; Phan Ngọc Tới	France; Leleu Johann; Maillard Guillaume; Nguyen Aymeric; Theodose Maxime	Italy; Riva Stefano; Ximenes Marco; Parravicini Marco; Colombo Matteo
Đa Luyện Tay Không - Multiple Training without weapon	Vietnam; Trần Công Tạo; Trần Tấn Lập; Đoàn Hoàng Thâm; Nguyễn Phúc Thịnh	Algeria; Rabia Salah; Zaidi Hamza; Kintouli Mohamed; Halimi Khireddine	France; Agueeff Alexandre; Mankouri Alexis; Mankouri Rean; Violet Yohan
Đa Luyện Vũ Khí - Multiple Training with weapon	Algeria; Rabia Salah; Zaidi Hamza; Kintouli Mohamed; Halimi Khireddine	Iran; Medhi Amiri Far; Alimorteza Ramezani; Ali Mokhtari Hizat; Mahdi Mahmoudvand	Not awarded

==== Women's Performances ====
Event	Gold	Silver	Bronze
Long Hổ Quyền - Dragon Tiger Form	Matsuda Anne; Japan	Shared gold	Djelouli Nesrine; Algeria
Long Hổ Quyền - Dragon Tiger Form	Stratila Alexandra; Romania	Shared gold	Djelouli Nesrine; Algeria
Song Dao Pháp- Dual Knife form	Ciobotaru Lacramioara; Romania	Fantinato Chiara; Italy	Pashnina Elena; Russia
Tinh Hoa Lưỡng Nghi Kiếm Pháp - Ying Yang Sword Form	Di Nardi Iris; Italy	Barre Emmanuelle; France	Go An Ha; Germany
Thái Cực Đơn Đao Pháp - Aspect Broadsword Single Form	Barre Emmanuelle; France	Shared gold	Ciobotaru Lacramioara; Romania
Thái Cực Đơn Đao Pháp - Aspect Broadsword Single Form	Hứa Lê Cẩm Xuân; Vietnam	Shared gold	Ciobotaru Lacramioara; Romania
Song Luyện Kiếm - Pair Sword Form	Vietnam; Phạm Thị Bích Phượng; Trương Thạnh	Romania; Ciobotaru Lacramioara; Stratila Alexandra	Belarus; Sysoyeva Katsiaryna; Baranouskaya Sviatlana
Quyền Đồng Đội	France; Nguyen Marie Em; Prouteau Nathanaelle; Makouf Anissa	Algeria; Zairi Dalal; Djelouli Nesrine; Bouhraoua Sonia	Belgium; Heuzer Alicia; Stilmant Anne-Christine; Deroisy Rita

==== Mixed Performances ====
Event	Gold	Silver	Bronze
Tự Vệ Nữ - Self-defense	Vietnam; Mai Thị Kim Thùy; Nguyễn Văn Cường	Italy; Riva Lisa; Riva Stefano	France; Makouf Anissa; Maillard Guillaume
Đa Luyện Tay Không Nữ - 1 Female defends against 3 males without weapon	France; Olivre Sofia; Clautour Jerome; Leger Alex; Lamonerie Nicolas	Algeria; Bouhraoua Sonia; Lounes Salim Abdelaziz; Kabli Brahim / Kabli Moussa	Belgium; Benzerga Rabah; Kloss Quentin; Ryavec Antoine; Woska Margaux
Đa Luyện Vũ Khí Nữ - 1 Female defends against 3 males with weapon	Vietnam; Phạm Thị Bích Phượng; Nguyễn Văn Cường; Nguyễn Bình Định; Phan Ngọc Tới	Italy; Di Nardi Iris; Maltagliati Stefano; Colombo Matteo; Ximenes Marco	Algeria; Zairi Dalal; Lounes Salim Abdelaziz; Kabli Brahim; Kabli Moussa

=== Fighting ===
==== Men's Fighting ====
Event	Gold	Silver	Bronze
54 kg	Trần Anh Tuấn; Vietnam	Boris Labrador; France	Costoaea Traian; Romania
57 kg	Meisam Abbasi; Iran	Tomulescu Robert; Romania	Trần Ngọc Nam; Vietnam
60 kg	Nguyễn Duy Khánh; Vietnam	Niasse David; France	Din Adel; Algeria
60 kg	Nguyễn Duy Khánh; Vietnam	Niasse David; France	Alam Shah; Bangladesh
64 kg	Brahimi Bilel; Algeria	Janicki Jonathan; France	Hồ Minh Tâm; Vietnam
64 kg	Brahimi Bilel; Algeria	Janicki Jonathan; France	Bembel Yauheni; Belarus
68 kg	Konate Ibrahim; France	Mostapha Hassanvand; Iran	Montecchi Stefano; Belgium
68 kg	Konate Ibrahim; France	Mostapha Hassanvand; Iran	Abushunov Bakur; Russia
72 kg	Belkir Bouzid; Algeria	Mohammad Javad Sadegh; Iran	Asoyam Arman; Russia
72 kg	Belkir Bouzid; Algeria	Mohammad Javad Sadegh; Iran	Bonet Gilipol; Spain
77 kg	Lưu Đức Hiệp; Vietnam	Griselli Alessandro; Italy	Jankowski Sylwester; Poland
77 kg	Lưu Đức Hiệp; Vietnam	Griselli Alessandro; Italy	Berouane Adel; Algeria
82 kg	Ambrosio Josue; France	Nima Majidi; Iran	Mostphaoui Brahim; Algeria
82 kg	Ambrosio Josue; France	Nima Majidi; Iran	Jankowski Adam; Poland
90 kg	Bouchelouh Soufyane; Algeria	Torres Moya Miguel; Spain	Swiatkowski Marcin; Poland
90 kg	Bouchelouh Soufyane; Algeria	Torres Moya Miguel; Spain	Akbar Karimi; Iran
+90 kg	Reza Ekramfard; Iran	Munoz Marquez Antonio Manuel; Spain	Wojtkiewicz Lukasz; Poland
+90 kg	Reza Ekramfard; Iran	Munoz Marquez Antonio Manuel; Spain	Baelen Kevin; Belgium

==== Women's Fighting ====
Event	Gold	Silver	Bronze
51 kg	Trần Khánh Trang; Vietnam	Roghie Soltani Negar; Iran	Fabbro Chantal; Italy
51 kg	Trần Khánh Trang; Vietnam	Roghie Soltani Negar; Iran	Pigeau Caroline; France
54 kg	Nguyễn Thị Kim Hoàng; Vietnam	[[|]]	[[|]]
54 kg	Nguyễn Thị Kim Hoàng; Vietnam	[[|]]	[[|]]
57 kg	Trần Thị Phương Dung; Vietnam	Finocchio Tiziana; Italy	Belousova Marina; Russia
57 kg	Trần Thị Phương Dung; Vietnam	Finocchio Tiziana; Italy	Shahsanam Sedighi; Iran
60 kg	Nguyễn Thị Quyền Chân; Vietnam	Khadjeh Rezaei; Iran	Berseneva Olga; Russia
60 kg	Nguyễn Thị Quyền Chân; Vietnam	Khadjeh Rezaei; Iran	Bonnefoy Olivia; France
65 kg	Angho Sonia; France	Baranouskaya Sviatlana; Belarus	Galbusera Laura; Italy
+65 kg	Djelouli Nesrine; Algeria	Scarano Monica; Italy	Bujan Turon Laura; Spain
+65 kg	Djelouli Nesrine; Algeria	Scarano Monica; Italy	Sysoyeva Katsiaryna; Belarus
