= Vovinam World Championship 2017 =

Vietnamese martial arts competition

2017 WVVF Vovinam World Championships
- Host city: New Delhi, India
- Nations: 19
- Athletes: 350
- Dates: 3 to 5 August 2017
- Main venue: Talkatora Indoor Stadium

The 2017 WVVF Vovinam World Championships were the fifth edition of the Vovinam World Championship, and were held in New Delhi, India from 3 to 5 August 2017. The event gathered nearly 350 coaches and athletes from 19 countries around the world, competing in 16 combat weight categories and 27 technical performance events. All participants showcased the beauty of martial spirit and friendship as they engaged in shared activities and cultural exchanges, bonding with each other like members of one big family.

After three days of intense, high-level competition, the tournament concluded on the evening of August 5th. In the overall medal tally, the Vietnamese team secured first place with 17 gold, 9 silver, and 4 bronze medals. Algeria came in second with 12 gold, 10 silver, and 4 bronze medals. Cambodia took third place with 4 gold, 9 silver, and 9 bronze medals. They were followed by teams from Cambodia, the host country India, Iran, and others.

== Medal table ==
* Host nation (Host nation (India))

Rank	NOC	Gold	Silver	Bronze	Total
1	Vietnam	17	9	4	30
2	Algeria	12	10	4	26
3	Cambodia	4	9	9	22
4	India*	2	3	5	10
5	Iran	2	3	4	9
6	Italy	2	3	2	7
7	Myanmar	2	1	9	12
8	France	1	1	1	3
9	Russia	1	0	5	6
10	Afghanistan	0	1	3	4
11	Belarus	0	1	1	2
11	Romania	0	1	1	2
13	Ivory Coast	0	0	6	6
14	Bangladesh	0	0	1	1
14	Japan	0	0	1	1
14	Nepal	0	0	1	1
Totals (16 entries)		43	42	57	142

== Medal summary ==
=== Performances ===
==== Men's Performances ====
Event	Gold	Silver	Bronze
Ngũ Môn Quyền - Five Gate Form	Ly Boramy; Cambodia	Ouahab Fares; Algeria	Trần Thế Thường; Vietnam
Thập Thế Bát Thức Quyền - Ten technique, Eight Principle Form	Phạm Văn Thắng; Vietnam	Ouahab Fares; Algeria	Sudorruslan Robin Sudjanto; France
Tinh Hoa Lưỡng Nghi Kiếm Pháp - Ying Yang Sword Form	Maltagliati Stefano; Italy	Nguyễn Hoàng Tấn; Vietnam	Myo Tun Ent; Myanmar
Tứ Tượng Côn Pháp - Four Element Staff Form	Nguyễn Hoàng Tấn; Vietnam	Prak Sovanny; Cambodia	Socea Constantin Sinodor; Romania
Nhật Nguyệt Đại Đao Pháp - Sun Moon Broadsword Form	Huỳnh Khắc Nguyên; Vietnam	Baciu Mihai Marius; Romania	De Oliveira Lorenzo; Italy
Long Hổ Quyền - Dragon Tiger Form	Maltagliati Stefano; Italy	Trần Thế Thường; Vietnam	Min Khant Zarni; Myanmar
Đòn Chân Tấn Công - Leg Attack Techniques	Vietnam; Huỳnh Khắc Nguyên; Lâm Đông Vương; Nguyễn Văn Cường; Mai Đình Chiến	Algeria; Kabeli Moussa; Kabli Brahim; Bouslah Sid Ali; Bendjebbar Hamza	Cambodia; Prak Sovanny; Koeut Sopheak; San Socheat; Chren Bunlong
Song Luyện Kiếm - Pair Sword Form	Algeria; Timtaoucine Adil; Khichane Mohammed	Italy; De Oliveira Lorenzo; Maltagliati Stefano	Vietnam; Trần Thế Thường; Nguyễn Văn Cường
Song Luyện Mã Tấu - Pair Machete Form	Algeria; Timtaoucine Adil; Khichane Mohammed	Vietnam; Trần Thế Thường; Lâm Đông Vượng	Cambodia; Chin Piseth; Chren Bunlong
Song Luyện 3 - Pair Form Number 3	Algeria; Hireche Othmane; Bedjoudhou Bachir	Vietnam; Lê Toàn Trung; Lâm Trí Linh	Myanmar; Myo Tun Ent; Cho Manar
Song Luyện Dao - Pair Knife Form	Algeria; Hireche Othmane; Boulariache Mohamed	Italy; Coari Davide; Smiraglia Stefano	Cambodia; Chin Piseth; Chren Bunlong
Đa Luyện Tay Không - Multiple Training without weapon	Vietnam; Trần Công Tạo; Trần Tấn Lập; Đoàn Hoàng Thâm; Nguyễn Phúc Thịnh	Algeria; Kabeli Moussa; Kabli Brahim; Bouslah Sid Ali; Bendjebbar Hamza	Cambodia; Prak Sovanny; Chin Piseth; San Socheat; Chren Bunlong
Đa Luyện Vũ Khí - Multiple Training with weapon	Myanmar; Myo Tun Ent; Chan Myae Aung; Cho Manar; Ye Wint Ittoo	Algeria; Kabeli Moussa; Kabli Brahim; Bouslah Sid Ali; Bendjebbar Hamza	Cambodia; Koeut Sopheak; Chin Piseth; San Socheat; Chren Bunlong
Quyền Đồng Đội - 3 Athletes Perform Long Hổ Quyền	Algeria; Ouahab Fares; Bedjoudjou Bachir; Benhadj Djilali Magraoui Abdelhak	Cambodia; Chin Piseth; San Socheat; Ly Boramy	India; Alok Kumar; Shubham Shanjay Nakate; Rushikesh Rajgoanda Patil
Đồng Đội Kỹ Thuật Căn Bản - Basic Technique Self-defense, 6 Athletes	Algeria; Hireche Othmane; Bedjoudjou Bachir; Benhadj Djilali Magraoui Abdelhak; Lounas Salim Abdelaziz; Illoul Hassane; Boulariache Mohamed	India; Alok Kumar; Shubham Shanjay Nakate; Maibam Tomba; Chongtham Mahadeva; Keisham Raju; Leitanthem Ajit	Ivory Coast; Digbeu Eric; Brete Allassane; Traore Ismael; Silue Namehin; Coulibaly M.Abdalah; Tuo D. Amourlayle

==== Women's Performances ====
Event	Gold	Silver	Bronze
Long Hổ Quyền - Dragon Tiger Form	Nguyễn Thị Ngọc Trâm; Vietnam	Khine War Phu; Myanmar	Soeur Chanleakhena; Cambodia
Long Hổ Quyền - Dragon Tiger Form	Nguyễn Thị Ngọc Trâm; Vietnam	Khine War Phu; Myanmar	Alkherraz Hadjer; Algeria
Song Dao Pháp - Dual Knife Form	Khine War Phu; Myanmar	Hứa Lê Cẩm Xuân; Vietnam	Alkherraz Hadjer; Algeria
Tinh Hoa Lưỡng Nghi Kiếm Pháp - Ying Yang Sword Form	Nguyen Marie-Em; France	Mai Thị Kim Thùy; Vietnam	Pov Sokha; Cambodia
Thái Cực Đơn Đao Pháp - Aspect Broadsword Single Form	Hứa Lê Cẩm Xuân; Vietnam	Pal Chhor Raksmy; Cambodia	Recalcati Rebecca; Italy
Song Luyện Kiếm - Pair Sword Form	Vietnam; Phạm Thị Bích Phượng; Trương Thạnh	Cambodia; Pov Sokha; Soeur Chanleakhena	Algeria; Bouharaoua Sonia; Zairi Dalel
Song Luyện Kiếm - Pair Sword Form	Vietnam; Phạm Thị Bích Phượng; Trương Thạnh	Cambodia; Pov Sokha; Soeur Chanleakhena	Myanmar; Khine War Phu; L She Lav Min Naing
Quyền Đồng Đội - 3 Athletes Perform Thập Tự Quyền	Cambodia; Pal Chhor Raksmy; Pov Sokha; Soeur Chanleakhena	Algeria; Bouhraoua Sonia; Zairi Dalel; Alkherraz Hadjer	Japan; Sadamatsu Yoshimi; Miyamoto Itsuko; Kaneshiro Mao
Song Luyện 3 - Pair Form Number 3	Vietnam; Lâm Thị Thùy Mỵ; Nguyễn Thị Cẩm Thùy	Algeria; Bouharaoua Sonia; Zairi Dalel	Cambodia; Soeur Chanleakhena; Mao Monita
Đồng Đội Kỹ Thuật Căn Bản - Basic Technique Self-defense, 6 Athletes	India; Huidrom Henna; Haobam Omita Sonia; Loushambam Pushpa Devi; Sagolsem Jelly; Sanasam Neha Chanu; Sapam Lanchenbi Devi	Not awarded	Not awarded

==== Mixed Performances ====
Event	Gold	Silver	Bronze
Tự Vệ Nữ - Self-defense	Algeria; Senigri Ayoub; Bouhraoua Sonia	Italy; Recalcati Rebecca; Maltagliati Stefano	Myanmar; Chit Node Soung; Min Khant Zarni
Đa Luyện Tay Không Nữ - 1 Female defends against 3 males without weapon	Algeria; Zairi Dalel; Illoul Hassane; Senigri Ayoub; Lounas Salim Abdelaziz	Vietnam; Nguyễn Thị Thu Thảo; Bùi Lê Nhật Minh; Phan Lê Hữu Tâm; Nguyễn Phúc Thịnh	Cambodia; Soeur Chanleakhena; Chin Piseth; Chren Bunlong; Koeut Sopheak
Đa Luyện Vũ Khí Nữ - 1 Female defends against 3 males with weapon	Cambodia; Pal Chhor Raksmy; San Socheat; Ly Boramy; Prak Sovanny	Algeria; Zairi Dalel; Illoul Hassane; Senigri Ayoub; Lounas Salim Abdelaziz	Vietnam; Nguyễn Thị Hoài Nương; Nguyễn Văn Cường; Lê Phi Bảo; Trần Ngọc Nam
Đồng Đội Kỹ Thuật Căn Bản - Basic Technique Self-defense, 6 Athletes	Vietnam; Huỳnh Khắc Nguyên; Nguyễn Văn Cường; Lê Phi Bảo; Mai Thị Kim Thùy; Trương Thạnh; Nguyễn Thị Hoài Nương	Cambodia; Ten Din; San Socheat; Chin Piseth; Pal Chhor Raksmy; Pov Sokha; Mao Monita	India; Huidrom Henna; Haobam Omita Sonia; Loushambam Pushpa Devi; Leitanthem Ajit; Maibam Tomba; Keisham Raju

=== Fighting ===
==== Men's Fighting ====
Event	Gold	Silver	Bronze
54 kg	Ten Din; Cambodia	Lương Cẩm Vinh; Vietnam	Bhujel Shankar; Nepal
54 kg	Ten Din; Cambodia	Lương Cẩm Vinh; Vietnam	Myo Tun Ent; Myanmar
57 kg	Trần Ngọc Nam; Vietnam	Mokhtari Hizaji Ali; Iran	Sadaat Sayed Ahmad Bilal; Afghanistan
57 kg	Trần Ngọc Nam; Vietnam	Mokhtari Hizaji Ali; Iran	Prashant Singh; India
60 kg	Nguyễn Thanh Liêm; Vietnam	Ten Pheap; Cambodia	Mohammadi Mujtaba; Afghanistan
60 kg	Nguyễn Thanh Liêm; Vietnam	Ten Pheap; Cambodia	Tsoi Sergei; Russia
64 kg	Phạm Trường Sa; Vietnam	Hussaini Mohammad Mosa; Afghanistan	Simbirev Sergey; Russia
64 kg	Phạm Trường Sa; Vietnam	Hussaini Mohammad Mosa; Afghanistan	Min Khant; Myanmar
68 kg	Kherbouche Chouaib; Algeria	Behevitra Bonnet Eros; France	Afzali Azmuddin; Afghanistan
68 kg	Kherbouche Chouaib; Algeria	Behevitra Bonnet Eros; France	Silue Namehin Ousmane; Ivory Coast
72 kg	Ghobadi Nejad Sajad; Iran	Dine Adil; Algeria	Grinenko Ilia; Russia
72 kg	Ghobadi Nejad Sajad; Iran	Dine Adil; Algeria	Hoàng Minh Khoa; Vietnam
77 kg	Belkir Bouzid; Algeria	Nguyễn Tiến Sơn; Vietnam	Asoyan Arman; Russia
77 kg	Belkir Bouzid; Algeria	Nguyễn Tiến Sơn; Vietnam	Digbeu Eric; Ivory Coast
82 kg	Tarhani Javad; Iran	Artsiomenka Anton; Belarus	Gurev Ivan; Russia
82 kg	Tarhani Javad; Iran	Artsiomenka Anton; Belarus	Mechegueg Oussama; Algeria
90 kg	Mechegueg Nour Elisslam Ouail; Algeria	Akbar Khani Ali Asghar; Iran	Subharth Sahu; India
90 kg	Mechegueg Nour Elisslam Ouail; Algeria	Akbar Khani Ali Asghar; Iran	Sapezhka Siarhei; Belarus
+90 kg	Iakovlev Anatoly; Russia	Bouchelouh Soufyane; Algeria	Sharifi Komel; Iran
+90 kg	Iakovlev Anatoly; Russia	Bouchelouh Soufyane; Algeria	Sanogo Aboubacar; Ivory Coast

==== Women's Fighting ====
Event	Gold	Silver	Bronze
54 kg	Nguyễn Thị Kim Hoàng; Vietnam	Mao Monita; Cambodia	Digbeu Axelle; Ivory Coast
54 kg	Nguyễn Thị Kim Hoàng; Vietnam	Mao Monita; Cambodia	Sagolsem Jelly; India
57 kg	Lê Thị Hiền; Vietnam	Davar Panah Maryam; Iran	Saki Akter; Bangladesh
57 kg	Lê Thị Hiền; Vietnam	Davar Panah Maryam; Iran	Khine War Phu; Myanmar
60 kg	Phùng Thị Hồng Thắm; Vietnam	Sapam Lanchenbi Devi; India	Koban Josiane; Ivory Coast
60 kg	Phùng Thị Hồng Thắm; Vietnam	Sapam Lanchenbi Devi; India	Nasrollahi Marzieh; Iran
65 kg	Rahmani Ouahiba; Algeria	Chan Seyha; Cambodia	Ahmad Panah Zagheh Shahla; Iran
70 kg	Phùng Thu Hà; Vietnam	Saumya Anand; India	Nouhi Hadiseh; Iran
75 kg	Mitali Upadhyay; India	Pov Sokha; Cambodia	L She Lav Min Maing; Myanmar

|}
