= Hergie Bacyadan =

Filipino boxer

Hergie Bacyadan OLY
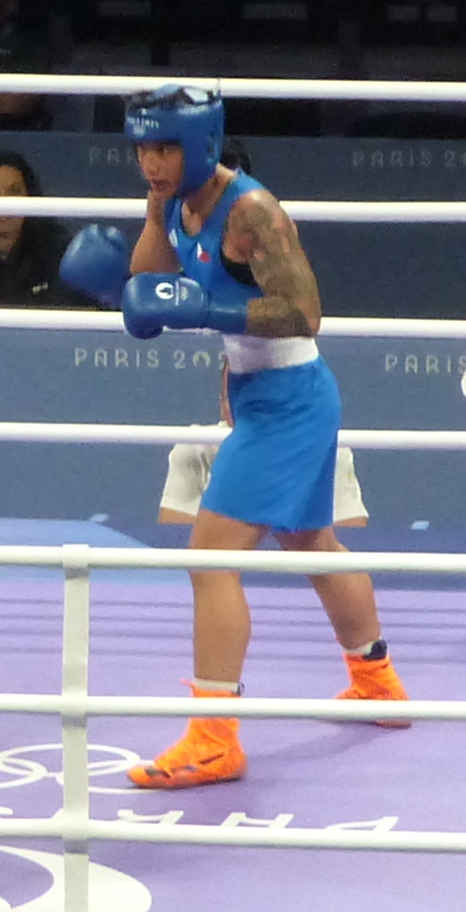
- Bacyadan competing at the 2024 Summer Olympics

Personal information
- National team: Philippines
- Born: Hergie Tao-Wag Bacyadan; November 4, 1994 (age 32) Quezon City, Philippines
- Home town: Tanudan, Kalinga
- Years active: 2016–
- Height: 168 cm (5 ft 6 in)
- Spouse: Lady Denily Digo

Sport
- Country: Philippines
- Sport: Boxing, Kickboxing, Wushu, Vovinam
- Boxing career
- Stance: Orthodox

Boxing record
- Total fights: 14
- Wins: 9
- Win by KO: 0
- Losses: 5
Medal record
Women's wushu
Representing the Philippines
World Championships
Silver medal – second place	2017 Kazan	–65 kg
Sanda World Cup
Silver medal – second place	2017 Foshan	–65 kg
Women's vovinam
Representing the Philippines
World Championships
Gold medal – first place	2023 Ho Chi Minh	–66 kg
SEA Games
Silver medal – second place	2023 Cambodia	–65 kg
Women's kickboxing
Representing the Philippines
Asian Championships
Gold medal – first place	2024 Phnom Penh	K1 -75 kg
Women's boxing
Representing the Philippines
SEA Games
Bronze medal – third place	2025 Thailand	Light middleweight

Hergie Tao-Wag Bacyadan (born November 4, 1994) is a Filipino boxer and kickboxer; also a former wushu and vovinam practitioner. As a transgender man who has not undergone gender-affirming surgery, Bacyadan has competed in the women's division in all sports.

He (Note: Hergie Bacyadan is a trans man who was assigned female at birth and competes in women's sports; he has not undergone any surgery for his masculine features. He has no publicly stated pronoun preference, although a One Sports article published through correspondence with Bacyadan's partner asserts he prefers he/him pronouns.) is the first Vovinam World Championships gold medalist for the Philippines and a boxer who has qualified for the 2024 Summer Olympics.

== Career ==
=== Martial arts ===
Bacyadan is a martial artist who engages in wushu and vovinam.

==== Wushu ====
Bacyadan first made it to the Philippine national wushu team in 2016. He took part at the inaugural Sanda Asian Cup in 2017 held in Foshan, China, winning a silver in the 65-kilogram division. At the 2017 World Wushu Championships in Kazan, Russia, he won another silver.

==== Vovinam ====
Bacyadan would briefly compete in vovinam, and lost weight as part of his preparation for the vovinam competition at the 2023 SEA Games in Cambodia.

Bacyadan competed in the 2023 Vovinam World Championships in the women's combat 66 kg division title and became the Philippines' first vovinam champion, winning against Mariana Abdeenko in the final.

In response, Russia filed a protest calling to nullify the result and issue a ban against Filipino athletes for future competitions, claiming that it was because Bacaydan is a "man". The Philippine federation condemned its Russian counterpart, with Bacyadan affirming that he is eligible to compete as he is "born female" and has not taken male hormones or gender surgery, due to the fact that such procedures would result in disqualification.

==== Kickboxing ====
Bacyadan also has competed in kickboxing. He won a gold medal in the women's K1 -75 kg division of the 2024 Asian Kickboxing Championships in Phnom Penh, Cambodia. This qualified him a berth in the 2025 World Games in China.

=== Boxing ===
Bacyadan's shift to boxing was marked by his participation at the 2019 ASBC Asian Grand Slam Boxing Championships in Xiamen, China as part of his bid to qualify for in the Summer Olympics.

Bacyadan qualified for the 2024 Summer Olympics in Paris through winning his quota bout at the 2024 World Olympic Qualification Tournament 2 against Maryelis Yriza of Venezuela.

Bacyadan prefers sparring with cisgender male boxers as part of his practice, which he believes benefits him in women's boxing.

In the 2024 Summer Olympics, Li Qian would eliminate him early via unanimous decision in round 16 of the women's 75 kg (middleweight) division. Shortly after the end of his stint, Bacyadan have expressed openness to turn to professional boxing.

At the 2025 SEA Games in Thailand, Bacyadan won a bronze medal in the women's 70 kg division. Having a bye to the semifinals, he lost his only fight against Thai boxer Manikon Baison.

== Personal life ==
Bacyadan is a transgender man. He discussed his gender identity in an interview with Preview, acknowledging that he was born as a woman but that his "heart and mind" are that of a man. Despite this, Bacyadan competes in the women's divisions, as he has not undergone any hormone replacement therapy or surgery which would risk his eligibility.

He has stood by Imane Khelif of Algeria and Lin Yuting of Taiwan who were involved in their own sex verification controversy in the 2024 Summer Olympics. Bacyadan affirmed Khelif and Lin are cis women and are fully qualified to participate and disavowed misinformation in social media that he has called for the ban of the two boxers.

Bacyadan hails from Tanudan, Kalinga and is of the Kalinga ethnic group. He says that his tribe accepts his gender identity, and he is allowed to wear traditional men's clothes such as the bahag.

Bacyadan describes his sexual orientation as being "attracted to women". He married Lady Denily Digo, a bisexual cis woman, in Utah, United States in November 2022. The couple are online content creators with a presence on TikTok, Facebook and Instagram.

In September 2025, the couple announced they are expecting their first child. In November 2025, Digo shared on how she became pregnant via in vitro fertilisation.
