= 2024 Vocotruyen World Championship =

2024 WFVV World Vocotruyen Championships
- Venue: District 7 Multi-purpose Gymnasium
- Location: Ho Chi Minh City, Vietnam
- Dates: 1-6 August in 35 events

The 2024 Vocotruyen World Championships was the 4th Vietnamese Traditional Martial Arts World Championship, held in Ho Chi Minh City, Vietnam, from 1-6 August 2024, in the District 7 Multi-purpose Gymnasium.

== Medal table ==
* Host nation (Host nation (Vietnam))

Rank	NOC	Gold	Silver	Bronze	Total
1	Vietnam*	23	25	23	71
2	Russia	4	3	5	12
3	France	4	0	2	6
4	Morocco	3	2	1	6
5	Italy	1	2	1	4
6	Belarus	0	2	2	4
7	India	0	1	1	2
8	Ivory Coast	0	0	3	3
Totals (8 entries)		35	35	38	108

== Medal summary ==
=== Demonstration categories ===
==== Men's Demonstration ====
Event	Gold	Silver	Bronze
Ngọc Trản Quyền	Minh Tri Nguyen; France	Đoàn Đình Mạnh; Vietnam	Trần Nhật Duy; Vietnam
Siêu Xung Thiên	Nguyễn Thanh Phong; Vietnam	Võ Hoàng Nam; Vietnam	Lê Công Minh; Vietnam
Độc Lư Thương	Lê Thanh Hải; Vietnam	Đặng Hải Ninh; Vietnam	Trịnh Phú Nhân; Vietnam
Thanh Long Độc Kiếm	Minh Tri Nguyen; France	Youssef Lakaoub; Morocco	Sulyann Opiola; France
Phong Hoa Đao	Elmahdi Benhammadi; Morocco	Nguyễn Hoàng Duy Minh; Vietnam	Trần Thanh Thích; Vietnam
Optional: Single bare hand form	Elmahdi Benhammadi; Morocco	Bentalha Zakaria; Morocco	Koffi Kouamé Marc Cédric; Ivory Coast
Optional: Single weapon form	Julyann Opiola; France	Nìm Quốc Hùng; Vietnam	Lê Hoàng Anh; Vietnam
Optional combat: bare hand vs bare hand	Vietnam; Nguyễn Xuân Hiển; Nguyễn Lê Tấn Thạnh; Nguyễn Hoàng Duy Minh; Nguyễn Đức Hùng	Vietnam; Trần Nhật Duy; Nguyễn Thành Lộc; Giảng Hoàng Quốc Khánh; Đặng Viết Trí	Ivory Coast; Gouali Wylli Aboudramane; Koffi Kouamé Marc Cédric; Konan Raymond Louis; Irigo Eric
Optional combat: bare hand vs weapons	Vietnam; Lê Nguyễn Đình Lân; Trần Gia Huy; Nìm Quốc Hùng	Vietnam; Trần Thanh Thích; Nguyễn Thanh Phong; Trịnh Phú Nhân; Lê Quang Nhật	Vietnam; Lê Minh Thư; Ngô Minh Hiền; Nguyễn Văn Tôn Giáp
Optional combat: weapons vs weapons	Vietnam; Nguyễn Xuân Hiển; Nguyễn Lê Tấn Thạnh; Nguyễn Hoàng Duy Minh; Nguyễn Đức Hùng	Vietnam; Trần Thanh Thích; Nguyễn Thanh Phong; Trịnh Phú Nhân; Lê Quang Nhật	Vietnam; Bùi Huy Bắc; Nguyễn Minh Tuấn; Hồng Nhựt Hào; Lê Thanh Toàn; Phạm Ngọc Khoa

==== Women's Demonstration ====
Event	Gold	Silver	Bronze
Lão Mai Quyền	Carvalheiro Alexandra; France	Lê Thị Hồng Trang; Vietnam	Margherita Lipparini; Italy
Thái Sơn Côn	Livia Mosciatti; Italy	Trần Thúy Vy; Vietnam	Carvalheiro Alexandra; France
Hùng Kê Quyền	Lê Thị Hồng Trang; Vietnam	Dương Thị Thanh Đào; Vietnam	Ngô Kim Ngọc; Vietnam
Lão Hổ Thượng Sơn	Nguyễn Thị Thanh Thảo; Vietnam	Margherita Lipparini; Italy	Trịnh Lương Nguyệt; Vietnam
Song Tuyết Kiếm	Nguyễn Thị Tuyết Nhung; Vietnam	Đoàn Thị Hiền Nhi; Vietnam	Misbah Sofia; Morocco
Optional: Single bare hand form	Misbah Sofia; Morocco	Livia Mosciatti; Italy	Suba Sherin Selvaraj; India
Optional: Single weapon form	Nguyễn Thị Thảo Vân; Vietnam	Đỗ Thị Như Quỳnh; Vietnam	Zhuleva Ekaterina; Russia

=== Figting categories ===
==== Men's Fighting ====
Event	Gold	Silver	Bronze
50 kg	Kha Chí Cường; Vietnam	Leribad Singh Khangembam; India	Not awarded
50 kg	Kha Chí Cường; Vietnam	Leribad Singh Khangembam; India	Not awarded
55 kg	Bùi Đức Anh; Vietnam	Phạm Văn Giang; Vietnam	Lê Mạnh Đức; Vietnam
55 kg	Bùi Đức Anh; Vietnam	Phạm Văn Giang; Vietnam	Nadir Alibegov; Russia
60 kg	Huỳnh Hậu Thành Nhân; Vietnam	Valerii Strelchenko; Russia	Trần Quang Vũ; Vietnam
60 kg	Huỳnh Hậu Thành Nhân; Vietnam	Valerii Strelchenko; Russia	Nguyễn Đặng Quốc Tiến; Vietnam
65 kg	Nguyễn Giang Sơn; Vietnam	Tạ Đức Dũ; Vietnam	Nguyễn Hữu Dậu; Vietnam
65 kg	Nguyễn Giang Sơn; Vietnam	Tạ Đức Dũ; Vietnam	Arsen Aliev; Russia
70 kg	Dimitrii Zverev; Russia	Lê Văn Sơn; Vietnam	Nguyễn Tiến Lộc; Vietnam
70 kg	Dimitrii Zverev; Russia	Lê Văn Sơn; Vietnam	Tsimafei Marozau; Belarus
75 kg	Rơ O Phú; Vietnam	Ngô Đức Mạnh; Vietnam	David Avagian; Russia
75 kg	Rơ O Phú; Vietnam	Ngô Đức Mạnh; Vietnam	Not awarded
80 kg	Artem Kozhokin; Russia	Nguyễn Mạnh Cường; Vietnam	Lê Phước Huy; Vietnam
80 kg	Artem Kozhokin; Russia	Nguyễn Mạnh Cường; Vietnam	Trịnh Hoàng Vũ Bình; Vietnam
85 kg	Lương Minh Cảnh; Vietnam	Trần Vinh Huy; Vietnam	Konan Raymond Louis; Ivory Coast
85 kg	Lương Minh Cảnh; Vietnam	Trần Vinh Huy; Vietnam	Võ Thành Đức; Vietnam
90 kg	Nguyễn Tiến Sơn; Vietnam	Sergri Reznikov; Russia	Not awarded
90 kg	Nguyễn Tiến Sơn; Vietnam	Sergri Reznikov; Russia	Not awarded
+90 kg	Andrei Grosul; Russia	Aliaksandr Nichyporchyk; Belarus	Nguyễn Chí Nghĩa; Vietnam
+90 kg	Andrei Grosul; Russia	Aliaksandr Nichyporchyk; Belarus	Trần Tâm; Vietnam

==== Women's Fighting ====
Event	Gold	Silver	Bronze
48 kg	Phạm Thị Phượng; Vietnam	Nguyễn Bạch Như Thùy; Vietnam	Phan Thị Thùy Linh; Vietnam
48 kg	Phạm Thị Phượng; Vietnam	Nguyễn Bạch Như Thùy; Vietnam	Daria Ivakina; Russia
52 kg	Phan Thị Dung; Vietnam	Lý Thị Thu Thanh; Vietnam	Yauheniya Haidukevich; Belarus
52 kg	Phan Thị Dung; Vietnam	Lý Thị Thu Thanh; Vietnam	Trần Hải Anh; Vietnam
56 kg	Nguyễn Thị Hải Yến; Vietnam	Katsiaryna Krahel; Belarus	Not awarded
56 kg	Nguyễn Thị Hải Yến; Vietnam	Katsiaryna Krahel; Belarus	Not awarded
60 kg	Lâm Thị Thúy Tuyên; Vietnam	Hoàng Thị Thu Hiền; Vietnam	Not awarded
60 kg	Lâm Thị Thúy Tuyên; Vietnam	Hoàng Thị Thu Hiền; Vietnam	Not awarded
65 kg	Nguyễn Thị Uyển Nhi; Vietnam	Hoàng Thị Huyền Trang; Vietnam	Nguyễn Thị Diễm Quỳnh; Vietnam
65 kg	Nguyễn Thị Uyển Nhi; Vietnam	Hoàng Thị Huyền Trang; Vietnam	Trần Thị Hạnh; Vietnam
70 kg	Trần Thị Hậu; Vietnam	Bùi Thị Như Thảo; Vietnam	Not awarded
70 kg	Trần Thị Hậu; Vietnam	Bùi Thị Như Thảo; Vietnam	Not awarded
75 kg	Anastasiia Kotova; Russia	Nguyễn Hoàng Tố Trinh; Vietnam	Not awarded
75 kg	Anastasiia Kotova; Russia	Nguyễn Hoàng Tố Trinh; Vietnam	Not awarded
+75 kg	Hà Thị Kiều Anh; Vietnam	Avdeenko Mariana; Russia	Not awarded
+75 kg	Hà Thị Kiều Anh; Vietnam	Avdeenko Mariana; Russia	Not awarded
