= Vovinam World Cup 2010 =

Vietnamese martial arts competition

2010 Vovinam VietVoDao World cup
- Host city: Hachen, Germany
- Nations: 13
- Athletes: 400
- Dates: 25–29 August 2010

The 2010 Vo Vietnam World cup were the 3rd edition of the Vovinam VietVoDao World Cup, and were held in Hachen, North Rhine-Westphalia, Germany from 25 to 29 August 2010.

== Medal table ==
* Host nation (Host nation (Germany))

Rank	NOC	Gold	Silver	Bronze	Total
1	France	11	6	8	25
2	Algeria	8	7	7	22
3	Senegal	3	6	2	11
4	Belgium	2	2	3	7
5	Ivory Coast	1	0	0	1
5	Ukraine	1	0	0	1
7	Burkina Faso	0	1	1	2
7	Russia	0	1	1	2
7	Spain	0	1	1	2
10	Germany*	0	0	1	1
10	Switzerland	0	0	1	1
Totals (11 entries)		26	24	25	75
