= Vovinam World Cup 2014 =

Vietnamese martial arts competition

2014 Vovinam VietVoDao World cup
- Host city: Pais, France
- Nations: 15
- Athletes: 500
- Dates: 24–26 July 2014

The 2014 Vo Vietnam World cup were the 4nd edition of the Vovinam VietVoDao World Cup, and were held in Paris, France from 24 to 26 July 2014.
