= World Vovinam Federation =

International governing body for Vovinam

- Sport: Vovinam
- Category: Sports federation
- Jurisdiction: International
- Abbreviation: WVVF
- Founded: 25 September 2008; 17 years ago in Ho Chi Minh City, Vietnam
- Affiliation: National Vovinam federations in 74 countries
- Headquarters: Ho Chi Minh City, Vietnam
- President: Dr. Mai Huu Tin
- Vice president(s): Tran Van My, Bach Ngoc Chien, Le Hai Binh, Florin Macovei, Mohammed Djouadj, Mohammad Nouhi, Vishnu Sahai, Santipharp Intaraphartn, Vittorio Cera

Official website
- vovinam.world

The World Vovinam Federation (WVVF) is the international governing body for Vovinam with 74 member countries, responsible for standardizing technical curricula, organizing world championships, accrediting instructors, and promoting the global development of the discipline. The federation oversees national and continental Vovinam organizations and works to expand the martial art’s presence in international multi-sport events.

== History ==
Vovinam was created in 1938 in Hanoi by Master Nguyễn Lộc, who envisioned a modern martial art inspired by traditional Vietnamese techniques as well as regional Asian systems. His goal was to build a method of training that would strengthen practitioners physically and mentally while instilling discipline, courage, and national identity.

In the years that followed, Vovinam’s development was shaped by the turbulent history of Vietnam. Restrictions on martial arts during certain periods forced the community to adapt, and many early masters continued to teach the art discreetly. After the 1950s, Vovinam began to re-emerge publicly in southern Vietnam, and by the 1960s it was widely practiced and recognized for its dynamic techniques and signature aerial movements.

After 1975, the Vietnamese diaspora played a central role in spreading Vovinam beyond its homeland. Practitioners resettled across Europe, North America, Australia, and other parts of Asia, founding clubs and teaching the discipline to local communities. What had once been a national martial art became an international movement.

By the late 1980s, Vovinam had gained a foothold in dozens of countries. This growth led to the first major attempts to create international coordination among masters. In 1990, an International Vovinam–Việt Võ Đạo Conference in California brought together influential teachers to discuss unification. In 1996, the Second International Conference of Masters in Paris endorsed the idea of a single global federation that could harmonize technical standards and organize world-level competition. These gatherings established the groundwork for a unified global structure.

The decisive step toward global unification came in 2009, when the WVVF was officially established in Ho Chi Minh City. Its creation marked the first time the international Vovinam community had a formal governing body recognized by national and continental federations.

Since 2009, the WVVF has coordinated a rapid expansion of Vovinam’s reach. World championships are now held regularly, attracting athletes from dozens of countries. Regional federations in Asia, Europe, Africa, Oceania, and the Americas have strengthened their organizational structures, creating continental championships and educational programs. In parallel, Vovinam has gained visibility in major multi-sport events such as the Southeast Asian Games, and discussions continue regarding broader international recognition.

In 2023, Vovinam was officially acknowledged as an element of Vietnam’s intangible cultural heritage, underscoring the art’s cultural significance while the WVVF continues to promote its sporting development worldwide.

== Membership ==
The WVVF includes national organizations from more than 74 countries, representing diverse communities across Asia, Europe, and Africa. Membership continues to grow as new national federations are established and recognized.

=== Continental Federations ===
- Asia Vovinam Federation (AVF)
  - East Asian Vovinam Federation (EAVF)
  - South Asian Vovinam Federation (SAVF)
  - Southeast Asian Vovinam Federation (SEAVF)
  - Arab Vovinam Vietvodao Union (AVVU)
- European Vovinam Federation (EVVF)
- African Vovinam Federation (AVF-FAV)

== Events ==
- Vovinam World Championships - Inaugural event in 2009. These championships feature a broad range of competitive categories
- Southeast Asian Games - Hosted by Southeast Asian Games Federation. Following its debut in 2011, the organizing committee for the 27th SEA Games (Myanmar, 2013) officially approved Vovinam to be on the sports list.
- Asian Indoor Games - Hosted by Olympic Council of Asia (OCA). Vovinam was first incorporated into the Asian Indoor Games in 2009.

== Guardian Girls Vovinam ==
WVVF officially signed a global Memorandum of Understanding with Guardian Girls International (GGI) in Hanoi, Vietnam, on September 16, 2025. Through this partnership, WVVF joined GGI in launching Guardian Girls Vovinam (GGV), a global initiative dedicated to advancing gender equality and protecting women and girls from violence through the practice and values of Vovinam.

== See also ==
- Vovinam – Việt Võ Đạo
- Vietnamese martial arts
- Martial arts
