= World Federation of Vietnam Vocotruyen =

Vocotruyen federation

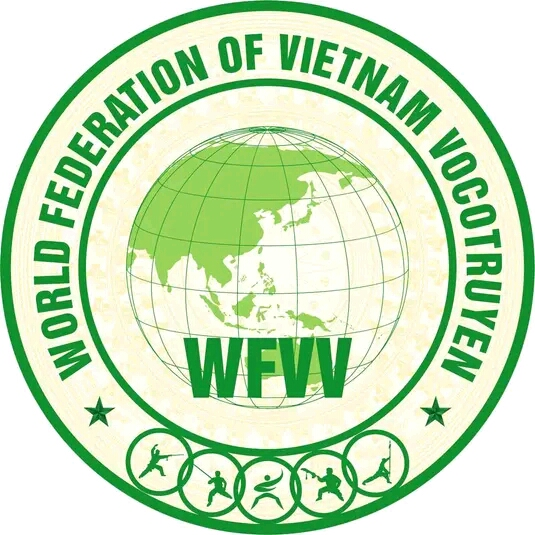
- Logo of World Federation of Vietnam Vocotruyen
- Category: Sports federation
- Jurisdiction: International
- Founded: 2015; 11 years ago
- Headquarters: Hanoi, Vietnam
- President: Vinh Giang Hoang

Official website
- www.wf-vv.com

The World Federation of Vietnam Vocotruyen (WFVV) was founded in 2015. The WFVV organizes Vocotruyen World Championships every two years; they also organize the Vocotruyen World cup
