= World Cup Vovinam VietVoDao 2006 =

Vietnamese martial arts competition

2006 Vovinam VietVoDao World cup
- Host city: Algiers, Algeria
- Nations: 10
- Athletes: 174
- Dates: 28–30 April 2006
- Main venue: Harcha Arena

The 2006 Vo Vietnam World cup were the second edition of the Vovinam VietVoDao World Cup, and were held in Algiers, Algeria from 28 to 30

== Medal summary ==
=== Blue belt ===
==== Technical winner cup children ====
Event	Gold	Silver	Bronze	
Khai Mon Kuyen	Algeria Mohamed Khechen	France Yassine Bouhadjeb	Algeria Salah Mohamed-Cherif	
Song Luyen Mot	France Yassine Bouhadjeb - Anis Suici	Algeria Amine Nouari - Salim Lounes	Algeria Nor-Islam Mechegugue - Oussama Mechegugue	-

==== Technical winner cup female ====
Event	Gold	Silver	Bronze	
Self defense female	Algeria Dalal Zairi - Youssef Choucha - Mourad Lounes	Morocco Hajar Elabdellaoui - Yassine Elbdellaoui - Mohamed El arche - Soufiane Bechari	Algeria Sihem Zairi - Bilal Belaifa - Abdelmalek Airch	-

==== Technical winner cup male ====
Event	Gold	Silver	Bronze	
Khai Mon Kuyen synchronised	Senegal Bathily - Gueye - Beye	Algeria Samir Hamel - Saber Guendouzi - Mourad Lounes	France Viet Hoange - Mikael Devil - Julien Cozelin	
Song Luyen Mot	Algeria Ahmed Illoul - Nassim Zerzaihi	Algeria Samir Hamel - Saber Guendouzi	France Viet Hoang - Julien Gozelin	
Song Luyen Dao	Algeria Bilal Belaifa - Abdelmalek Airch	Algeria Samir Hamel - Saber Guendouzi	Morocco Khaled Anass - Yassine Abdellaoui	
Thab tu quyen	Algeria Hamza Slimani	Algeria Bilal Rougali	Algeria Fares Ouahab	
Lonig ho quyen	Senegal Khoudia Bathily	Algeria Mohamed Ailan	Algeria Bilel Belaifa	-

=== Black Belt ===
==== Technical winner cup ====
Event	Gold	Silver	Bronze
Lao mai quyen	France Luc Tran	France Thomas Inesta	Senegal Gerald Ndiogoye
Sabre quyen	Belgium Phi-Long Huynh	France David Chabineau	Senegal Gerald Ndiogoye
Long stick	Vietnam Huynh Khac Nguyen	France Olivier Robalodias	France Dinh Hoang Nguyen
Halberd	France Olivier Robalodias	Vietnam Huynh Khac Nguyen	Ivory Coast Lamine Ndiaye
Sabre	France David Chabineau - Olivier Robalodias	Vietnam Huynh Khac Nguyen - Hoang Viet Dang	France Dinh Hoang Nguyen - Georgio Petersen
Technic of fight	Algeria Zakaria Triki - Bilel Bounedjma	France David Chabineau - Olivier Robalodias	Vietnam Huynh Khac Nguyen - Hoang Viet Dang
Song luyen 2	Vietnam Huynh Khac Nguyen - Huynh Khac Nguyen	Algeria Zakaria Triki - Bilel Bounedjma	Algeria Redouane Bouznoune - Abdelhak Semmach
Scissor	France Georgio Peterson	Vietnam Huynh Khac Nguyen	France Thanh giang Doan

==== Sparring winner cup female ====
Event	Gold	Silver	Bronze
Female sparring all category	France Emily Faure		

==== Sparring winner cup male ====
Event	Gold	Silver	Bronze
-60 kg	Algeria Redouane Guendouzi	Algeria Rabeh Naoui	Algeria Athmane Djelloudi
60 to 65 kg	Senegal Moustapha Fall	Algeria Zakaria Triki	Algeria Lyas Haddad
65 to 70 kg	Algeria Abdelhak Semmach	Algeria Bilel Bounedjema	France Thanh Giang Doan
70 to 75 kg	France Giorgio Peterson	Algeria Abderhmane Ailan	Algeria Yassine Bouchaib
75 to 80 kg	Senegal A Ba	Senegal M Sow	Algeria Abdelmadjid Buenmouna
+80 kg	Ukraine Maksin Vershina	Algeria Yazid Boukhrchoufa	Algeria Tarek Cherfi

== Medal table ==
* Host nation (Host nation (Algeria))

Rank	NOC	Gold	Silver	Bronze	Total
1	Algeria*	8	12	11	31
2	France	7	5	6	18
3	Senegal	4	1	2	7
4	Vietnam	3	2	1	6
5	Belgium	1	0	0	1
5	Ukraine	1	0	0	1
7	Morocco	0	1	1	2
8	Ivory Coast	0	0	1	1
Totals (8 entries)		24	21	22	67
