= Vocotruyen World Championships =

Vovinam competition

Competition details
- Discipline: Vo Vietnam
- Type: Technical and Fighting
- Organiser: World Federation of Vietnam Vocotruyen (WFVV)

Divisions
- Current weight divisions: Male 50 kg, 55 kg, 60 kg, 65 kg, 70 kg, 75 kg 80kg 85 kg 90 kg and +90 kg Female 48 kg, 52 kg, 56 kg, 60 kg, 65 kg, 70 kg, 75 and +75kg.

History
- First edition: 2016 in Ho Chi Minh City, Vietnam
- Final edition: 2024 in Ho Chi Minh City, Vietnam

The Vocotruyen World Championships, also known as the Vo Vietnam World Championships, are one of the competition for Vietnam traditional martial arts organized by the World Federation of Vietnam Vocotruyen (WFVV).

== List of world championships ==
Edition	Year	Host city	Country	Source
1	2016	Ho Chi Minh	Vietnam	
2	2018	Hanoi	Vietnam	
~~—~~	~~2020~~	Marseille	cancelled	
3	2022	Algiers	Unrecognized	
4	2024	Ho Chi Minh City	Vietnam	
5	2026	Cervia	Italy	

== See also ==
- Vovinam World Championships
