= Vovinam World Championship 2015 =

Vietnamese martial arts competition

2015 Vovinam Vietvodao World Championships
- Host city: Algiers, Algeria
- Nations: 17
- Athletes: 450
- Dates: 29 July to 2 August 2015
- Main venue: Harcha Arena

The 2015 Vo Vietnam World Championship were the fourth edition of the Vovinam VietVoDao World Championship, and were held in Algiers, Algeria from 29 July to 2 August 2015.

== Medal table ==
* Host nation (Host nation (Algeria))

Rank	NOC	Gold	Silver	Bronze	Total
1	Vietnam	19	5	0	24
2	Algeria*	15	12	6	33
3	Italy	1	5	2	8
4	Cambodia	1	0	0	1
5	Senegal	0	4	9	13
6	Belarus	0	3	3	6
7	Germany	0	3	2	5
7	Iran	0	3	2	5
9	Ivory Coast	0	1	5	6
10	Burkina Faso	0	0	3	3
11	Mauritania	0	0	2	2
Totals (11 entries)		36	36	34	106
