= 2022 Vocotruyen World Championship =

2022 World Vocotruyen Championships
- Venue: Oval Arena
- Location: Algiers, Algeria
- Dates: 16−21 July in 43 events

The 2022 Vocotruyen World Championships was the 3rd Vietnamese Traditional Martial Arts World Championship, held in Algiers, Algeria, from 16–21 July 2022, in the Oval Arena.

== Medal summary ==
=== Fight events ===
==== Men's events ====
Event	Gold	Silver	Bronze
(55 kg)	Wylli Gouali; Ivory Coast	Abdelhamid Mansouri; Algeria	Not awarded
(55 kg)	Wylli Gouali; Ivory Coast	Abdelhamid Mansouri; Algeria	Not awarded
(60 kg)	seifeddine Zidane; Algeria	sidick Toure; Ivory Coast	Redouane Serai; Algeria
(60 kg)	seifeddine Zidane; Algeria	sidick Toure; Ivory Coast	Nassim Abourihche; Algeria
(65 kg)	Van Cuong Huynh; Vietnam	Sid Ali Bouzaia; Algeria	Eric Irigo; Ivory Coast
(65 kg)	Van Cuong Huynh; Vietnam	Sid Ali Bouzaia; Algeria	Younes Rabhi; Algeria
(70 kg)	Hichem Djaballah; Algeria	Ali Salah Amrane; Algeria	Baba diara Burkina Faso
(70 kg)	Hichem Djaballah; Algeria	Ali Salah Amrane; Algeria	Mohamed Timite; Ivory Coast
(75 kg)	Mourad Bounif; Algeria	Soheib Mestfaoui; Algeria	Elisee Sourabie; Burkina Faso
(75 kg)	Mourad Bounif; Algeria	Soheib Mestfaoui; Algeria	Duy Chi Thanh Bui; Vietnam
(80 kg)	Mohamed Aladine Derai; Algeria	Aymen Aiouaz; Algeria	Raymond Louis Konan; Ivory Coast
(80 kg)	Mohamed Aladine Derai; Algeria	Aymen Aiouaz; Algeria	Not awarded
(85 kg)	Nadir Azem; Algeria	Hichem Elkouadi; Algeria	Not awarded
(85 kg)	Nadir Azem; Algeria	Hichem Elkouadi; Algeria	Not awarded
(90 kg)	Mohamed Reda Bouchemal; Algeria	Sidali Amirouche; Algeria	Nafaa Gadouche; Algeria
(90 kg)	Mohamed Reda Bouchemal; Algeria	Sidali Amirouche; Algeria	Not awarded

==== Women's events ====
Event	Gold	Silver	Bronze
(48 kg)	Ghislaine Niamien; Ivory Coast	Nour El Houda Djahiri; Algeria	Not awarded
(48 kg)	Ghislaine Niamien; Ivory Coast	Nour El Houda Djahiri; Algeria	Not awarded
(56 kg)	Siham Radjla; Algeria	Kenza Khedim; Algeria	Jeanne Zemane; Burkina Faso
(56 kg)	Siham Radjla; Algeria	Kenza Khedim; Algeria	Yousra Kerbahi; Algeria
(60 kg)	Claire Kanma; Burkina Faso	Kahina Abouahi; Algeria	Not awarded
(60 kg)	Claire Kanma; Burkina Faso	Kahina Abouahi; Algeria	Not awarded
(65 kg)	khanh Huyen Le Thi; Vietnam	Sali Kamate; Ivory Coast	Rima Iazourene; Algeria
(65 kg)	khanh Huyen Le Thi; Vietnam	Sali Kamate; Ivory Coast	Clemense Ouedraogo; Burkina Faso
(70 kg)	Feriel Mahdi; Algeria	kenza Gago; Algeria	Not awarded
(70 kg)	Feriel Mahdi; Algeria	kenza Gago; Algeria	Not awarded
(75 kg)	Kelly Kouakou; Ivory Coast	Kahina Dani; Algeria	Haizia Bouzgag; Algeria
(75 kg)	Kelly Kouakou; Ivory Coast	Kahina Dani; Algeria	Safiata Ouedraogo; Burkina Faso
(over75 kg)	Lamia Filali; Algeria	Rose N'dri; Ivory Coast	Not awarded
(over75 kg)	Lamia Filali; Algeria	Rose N'dri; Ivory Coast	Not awarded

=== Technical events ===
==== Huy chuong noi dung quyen quy dinh ====
Gold	Silver	Bronze
Ngọc trản quyền – men
Vietnam Phan Hoang Long	Russia Riabow Artem	Italy Danese Gino
Siêu xung thiên – men
Vietnam Phan Hoang Long	Ivory Coast Irigo Eric	Russia Riabow Artem
Độc lư thương – men
Russia Kha Kuang Khyw		
Thanh long độc kiếm – men
Russia Belenko Alexander	Algeria Ouled Ali Akram	Italy Danese Gino
Phong hoa dao – men
Russia Kha Kuang Khyw	Ivory Coast Irigo Joel	
Tứ linh đao – men
Switzerland Davis Jeremy	Algeria Abismail Mohammed	Burkina Faso Diara Baba
Lão Mai quyền – women
Russia Ryabova Valeriya	Switzerland Davis Marisa	Ivory Coast Nari Rose
Thái sơn côn – women
Russia Ershova Ekaterina	Not awarded	Not awarded
Hùng kê quyền – women
Russia Tina Vasilisa	Italy Giulivo Giada	Ivory Coast Niamien Ghislaine
Lão hổ thượng sơn – women
Italy Choton Valverde Kimberly	Russia Ershova Ekaterina	Ivory Coast Niamiem Ghislaine
Song tuyết kiếm – women
Italy Giulivo Giada	Russia Ryabova Valeriya	
Tứ linh đao – women
Russia Tina Vasilisa	Burkina Faso Clemence Oudraogo Maria	Italy Choton Valverde Kimberly

==== Huy chuong noi dung bai tự chọn ====
Gold	Silver	Bronze
Quyền tự chọn cá nhân – men
Algeria Fawzi Adam Ahmed; Italy Bellow Sang	Algeria Mazar Billal; Ivory Coast Toure Aboubakar Sidick	Algeria Wahab Fares; Italy Jomini Leonardo
Quyền tự chọn cá nhân – women
Algeria Messad Katia Algeria Haddad Aya Arrahmane	Algeria Brahimi Salah Russia Ershova Ekaterina	Italy Gialivo Giada Algeria Zeraf Nassima
Binh khí dài cá nhân – men
Vietnam Nguyen Van Ut	Russia Kha Kuang Khyu	Algeria Messad Tahar
Binh khí dài cá nhân – women
Algeria Messad Katia	Russia Devaikiana Anastasia	Burkina Faso Ouedrabo Clemence
Binh khí ngắn cá nhân – men
Italy Danese Gino	Switzerland Low Ders Vinh Quang	Portugal Diogo Alves Russia Riabov Artem
Binh khí ngắn cá nhân – women
Russia Ryabova Valeriya	Italy Giulivo Giada	Algeria Sibachir Ayal
Binh khí mềm cá nhân – men & women
Vietnam Nguyen Van Ut	Russia Riabov Artem	Italy Choton Valverde

==== Huy chương nội dung tập thể ====
Gold	Silver	Bronze
Bài quyền tập thể
RussiaRyabova Valeriya Riabov Artem ina Vasilisa; Belenko Alexander; Kha Kuang Khyu	Ivory CoastDiallo Lamine Gowali Wylli; Toure Sidick	ItalyDanese Gino Choton Valverde Kimberly; Giulivo Gida
Bài binh khí tập thể
Ivory Coast Konan Raymond Irigo Joel; Doho Stephane	Russia Ryabova Valeriya Riabov Artem ina Vasilisa; Belenko Alexander; Kuang Khyw; Devaikiana Anastasia; Ershova Ekaterina; Bulanov Grigory	Russia Ryabova Valeriya Riabov Artem ina Vasilisa; Belenko Alexander; Kuang Khyw; Devaikiana Anastasia; Ershova Ekaterina; Bulanov Grigory

==== Huy chương bài nội dung đối luyện ====
Gold	Silver	Bronze
Bài đối luyện tay không – men–men
AlgeriaTouat Mouloud Touat Hocine; Slimani Rabah	Algeria Wahab Fares Kenani Mahdi; Maat Mohamed; Dahman Said	Algeria Adam Ahmed Fawzi Bendaikha Abdekader
Bai đối luyện tay không – men–women
Algeria Mesloub Nasima Mohand; Farid	Algeria Melissa Hadadi; Khelef	Algeria Khansaa Aya Arrahmane; Serine Boussadi
Bài đối luyện binh khí – men–men
Algeria Fetiti Hicham Mebark; Abdelouahed	Ivory Coast Jock Raymond; Yves Stephane	Italy Bellou Leonardo
Bài đối luyện binh khí – men–women
Algeria Kamelia Nadir; Younes	Russia Valeriya Artem; Alexander	Burkina Faso Safiata Jeanne; Claire; Clemence

==== Huy chương nội dung bài dưỡng sinh ====
Gold	Silver	Bronze
Bài dưỡng sinh đơn – men
Italy Biondo Ruggero	Russia Belenko Alexander	France Laurent Herada
Bài dưỡng sinh đơn – women
Russia Ryabova Valeriya	Italy Choton Valverde Kimberly	
Bài dưỡng sinh tập thể
Russia Ryabova Valeriya	Italy Choton Valverde Kimberly	Russia Ryabova Valeria Riabov Artem; Vasilisa; Belenko Alexander; Kha Kuang Khyu; Devaikiana Anastasia; Ershova Ekatei; Bulanov Grigori

== Medal table ==
Rank	Nation	Gold	Silver	Bronze	Total
1	Algeria	18	17	15	50
2	Russia	11	10	2	23
3	Vietnam	6	0	1	7
4	Ivory Coast	4	8	6	18
5	Italy	4	3	8	15
6	Switzerland	1	2	0	3
7	Burkina Faso	1	1	8	10
8	France	0	0	1	1
8	Portugal	0	0	1	1
Totals (9 entries)		45	41	42	128
