= Marathon des Dunes =

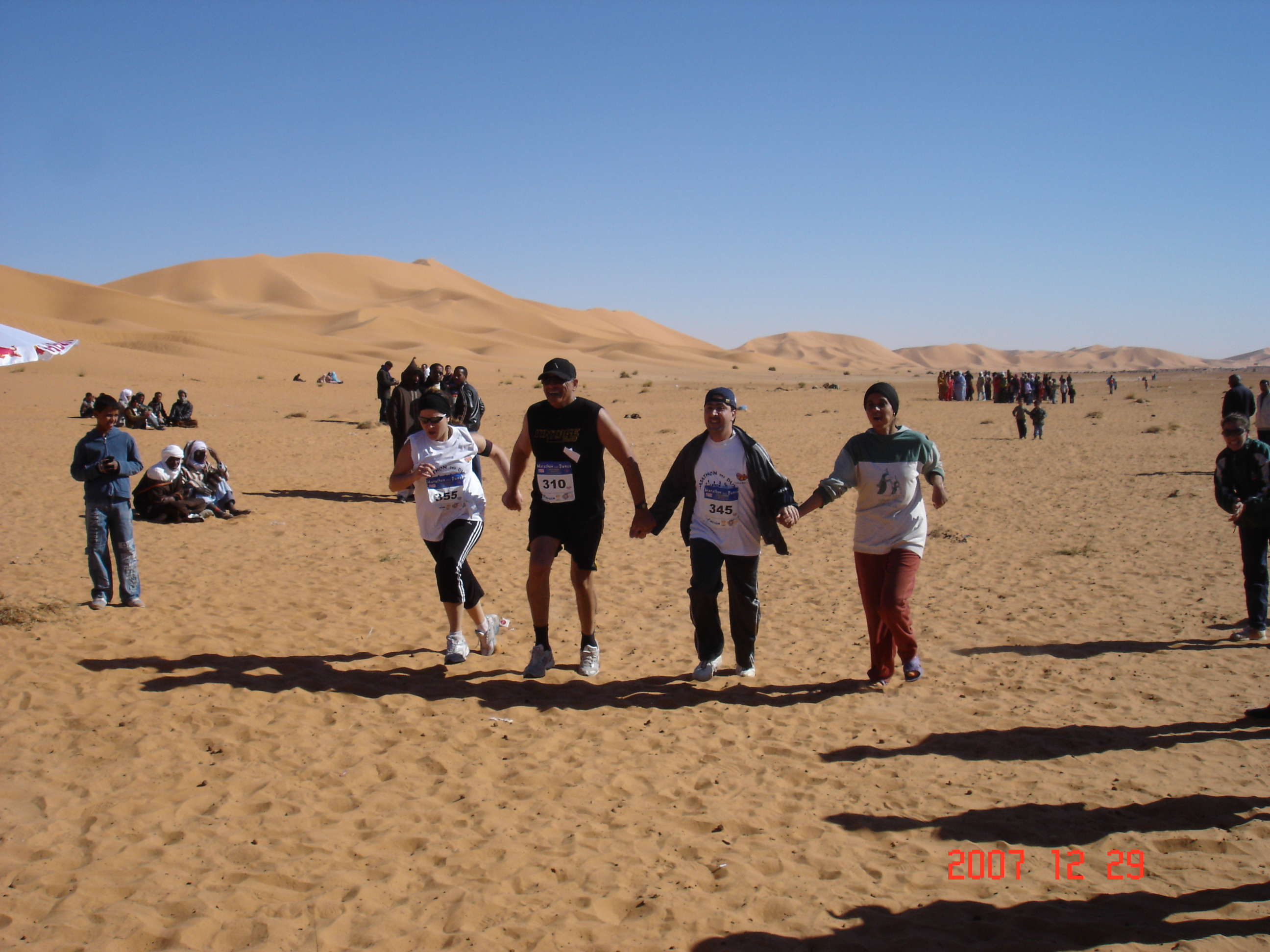
Marathon des Dunes participants, 2007

Marathon des Dunes is a sporting event that takes places in the Sahara desert in Algeria. It was first held in 2000 and its exact location and course changes from year to year.

The event usually covers the entire marathon distance of 42 km, but it splits the distance over 3 consecutive days and allows the competitors to complete the course by walking, running or any other unaided way of movement. The terrain varies from tarmac, rough terrain to sand dunes.

The marathon also features a cultural program, which includes apart from the race in the mornings, daily excursions to local museums, historical sights and religious temples such as old Zaouia (Pronounced ZAWIYA) and hermitages (Christian chapels found in the Algerian Sahara were founded by Charles de Foucault), local folk bands perform for the participants every night (local Saharan music ranges from Gnawa to Diwan or Targui), local food tasting through the renowned generosity of the people of the Sahara as they host walima from couscous and galette to tea and dates for all the athletes and participants. Cash prizes and trophies are awarded to the top 5 finishers.

The 2009 edition was held in the region of Bechar on the Algerian-Moroccan border. The 10th edition is scheduled for 9 December – 10 January in the Ahaggar region.

Winners in 2012:

- men: Akbli Mohamed (Béchar, Souara)
- women: Tassadit Taharount (Franche-Comté, France)
