= Vovinam =

Vietnamese martial art

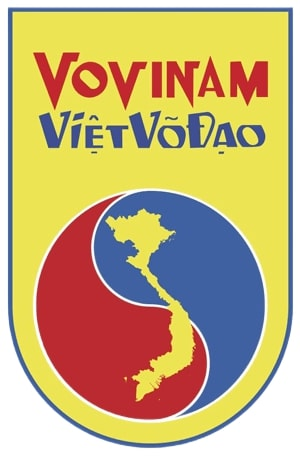

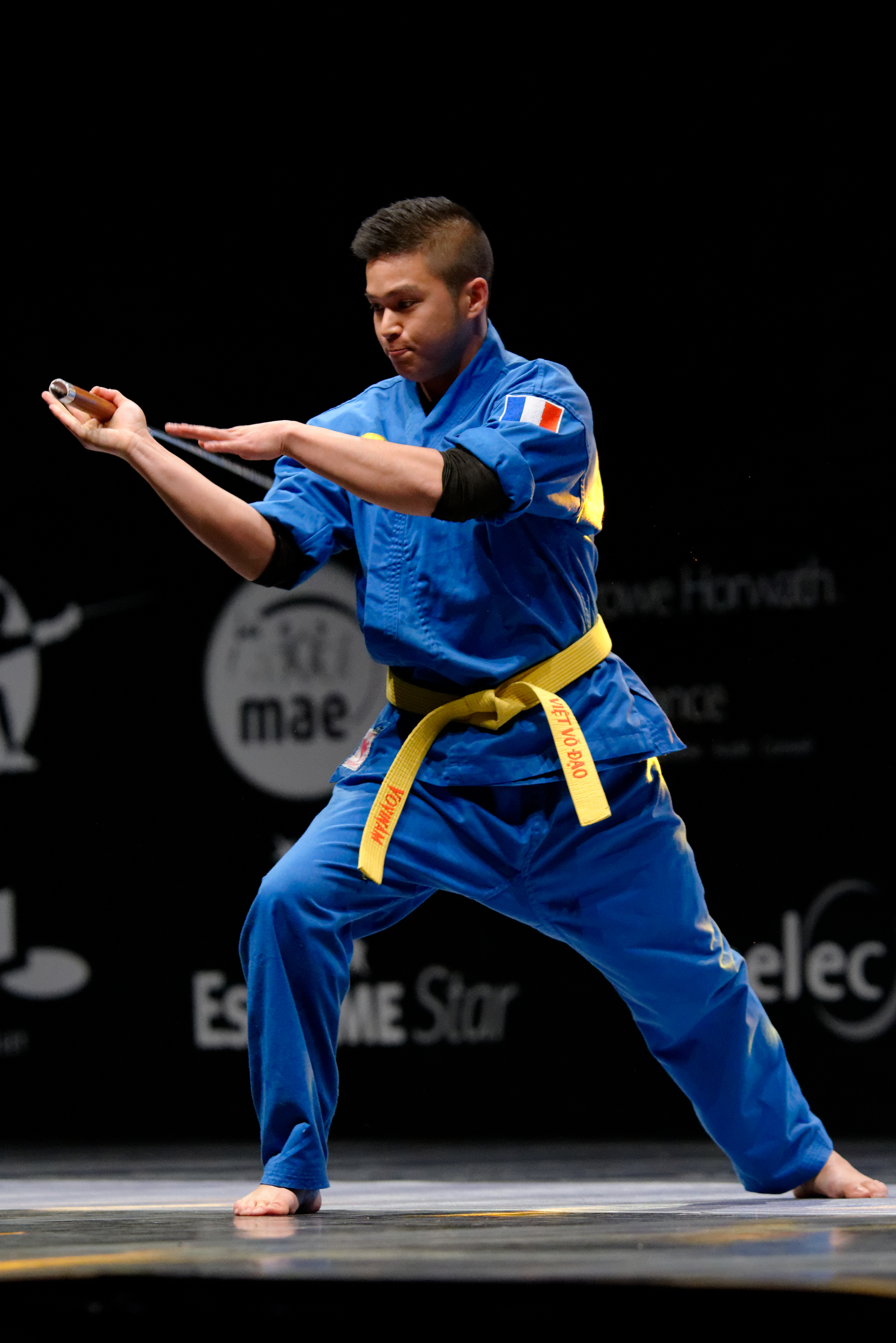
- Vovinam demonstration in France in 2014
- Also known as: Việt Võ Đạo, VVN, VVN/VVD
- Focus: Hybrid
- Hardness: Full-contact
- Country of origin: Vietnam
- Creator: Nguyễn Lộc
- Famous practitioners: Lê Sáng (Grandmaster)
- Parenthood: Vietnamese martial arts, Vietnamese traditional wrestling
- Olympic sport: No
- Official website: World Vovinam Federation (WVVF)

Vovinam (anglicized from Võ Việt Nam, meaning "Vietnamese Martial Arts"), officially known as Việt Võ Đạo (越武道, meaning "Vietnamese Way of Martial Arts") is a Vietnamese martial art founded in 1938 by Nguyễn Lộc. It is based on traditional Vietnamese eclectic sources. Vovinam today is considered by the Ministry of Culture, Sports and Tourism to be a "National Intangible Cultural Heritage" as of November, 2023.

Vovinam, based on the principle of "hard and soft", involves the use of strikes, elbows, kicks, knees, and wrestling moves, as well as weapons such as swords, knives, chisels, claws and fans that serve as training devices for reaching optimal control of body and mind. Students also learn defense techniques and forms. Amongst Vietnamese martial arts, Vovinam is the largest and most developed with more than 60 schools around the world, including Poland, Belgium, Canada, Cambodia, Denmark, Germany, the United States, Morocco, Norway, Russia, France, Romania, Switzerland, Sweden, Singapore, Uzbekistan, Thailand, Italy, Australia, India, Pakistan, Iran, Spain, Algeria, Taiwan and Greece, among others. Vovinam's international governing body is the World Vovinam Federation (WVVF), and competitors compete in the international Vovinam professional circuit.

== History ==
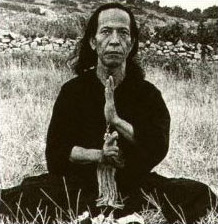
Nguyễn Dân Phú, a master of Vovinam

Vovinam was founded in 1938 by Nguyễn Lộc (1912–1960) in Hanoi, with the intent of providing practitioners with an efficient method of self-defense after a short period of study. Nguyễn believed martial arts would contribute to freeing Vietnam from colonial rule, which had been ruled by France since 1861, and from outside domination. Vovinam added elements of Chinese and Japanese systems to traditional Vietnamese martial arts, systems, which were thus partially created as a response to the French occupation, meant to promote a sense of national identity for the Vietnamese people. Hence, it is similar to taekwondo in that it is an eclectic system with combined elements of Japanese and Chinese martial arts within an indigenous framework.

After being invited to demonstrate Vovinam publicly in Hanoi with his disciples in 1940, Nguyễn was invited to teach the art at Hanoi's École Normale, and Vovinam gained in popularity. During the following years, political unrest increased throughout Vietnam; due to the system's nationalist political orientation, the art came under suppression. By 1954, Nguyễn had emigrated to South Vietnam, where he was able to continue to teach and establish Vovinam schools. His discipline was well received and within the year of arriving, he was even invited to train the police in Thủ Đức, Saigon. Unfortunately, he would fall terminally ill that same year and have to delegate all teaching to his senior student Grandmaster Lê Sáng while he relegated himself to backline research and study until he succumbed to his illness four years later. After his death in 1960, Grandmaster Lê Sáng continued the development and international promotion of Vovinam until his own death on September 27, 2010. During the Vietnam War throughout the mid-1960s under Lê, Vovinam secured teaching opportunities when its instructors were invited to train officers from the National Police. However, a brief rivalry was brewing between Vovinam practitioners and Taekwondo when the South Vietnamese government decided to have the hand-to-hand system utilized by the South Korean military to be the main hand-to-hand system for the South Vietnamese soldiers and have the South Korean troops train the South Vietnamese soldiers. The rivalry was only settled when the Central Military Command later came to an agreement for both Vovinam and Taekwondo as well as Judo to be allowed to be taught to the South Vietnamese military.

The first Vovinam school outside of Vietnam was established in Houston, Texas, by Vietnamese emigrants in 1976 after the Fall of Saigon. By 2000, Vovinam schools had been established in Australia, Belgium, Canada, France, Germany, Italy, Morocco, Poland, Spain, Switzerland, and the United States. Vovinam now exists without the political overtones (including anti-communist ones) it originally carried.

== Logo ==
The Vovinam/Việt Võ Đạo logo is framed in a yellow shield. This shape symbolizes the harmony of hard and soft. Within this yellow shape, the red text "Vovinam" is written above the marine blue text "Việt Võ Đạo". Beneath the text appears an Âm-Dương symbol in red and marine blue. The Âm-Dương is surrounded by a thick, white circle, symbolizing the being of the Dao, with the mission to mediate between negative and positive (Âm = Negative, Dương = Positive), to subdue the two, to enable life of all beings. A yellow map of Vietnam is superimposed on the symbol.

== Theory ==
=== Hard and soft ===
The yin and yang theory (Vietnamese: "Âm-Dương" and "Nhu-Cương") states that everything in the universe and on earth is initiated through the interrelation of Âm (negative) and Dương (positive). As to this theory there are martial arts that prefer the hard over the soft and others that prefer the soft over the hard. Vovinam Việt Võ Đạo does not prefer any over the other. Hard and soft are used equally to adapt to every situation, to every problem.

The student aims to develop the ability to combine hard and soft in combat and in daily life. This aims to develop both their physical abilities and spirit.

Not only the principle of the harmony of hard and soft but also many other things resulting from the training contribute to internalizing the martial art philosophy, e.g. fighting spirit, courage, tenacity, fairness, modesty and tolerance. Above all the training in morality and the way of applying the techniques shape the students' character. Emphasis is placed on recognizing one's ego and overcoming it.

Vovinam emphasizes generosity, tolerance, and respect for others. Its philosophy teaches that practitioners should develop themselves while also contributing to peaceful and harmonious relationships within their communities.

With the salutation "Iron Hand over benevolent heart", the student is reminded of the main principle and the goal of Vovinam Việt Võ Đạo with every training. It is also about using the opponent's force and reaction, reaching maximum effect with comparatively little force.

=== 10 principles of Vovinam Việt Võ Đạo ===
The term "Việt Võ Đạo ("the way (Dao) of Viet Vo") was coined by the patriarch of the second generation of the Vovinam Viet Vo Dao, Lê Sáng, with the objective of adding a philosophical dimension to his martial art. This "Viet Vo Dao" consists of ten principles:

1. Vovinam's disciples vow to pursue high proficiency in their martial art in order to serve the people and humanity.
2. Promise to be faithful to the intentions and teaching of Vovinam and develop the young generation of Vovinam Viêt Võ Dao.
3. Be united in spirit and heart, respect one's elder, be kind to one's peers.
4. Respect discipline absolutely, maintain the high standard of personal conduct and honour of a martial art disciple.
5. Have respect for other martial art schools, only use martial art skills for self-defense and protect justice.
6. Be studious, strengthen the mind, enrich one's thought & behavior.
7. Live simply, with chastity, loyalty, high principles and ethics.
8. Build up a spirit of steely determination and vigor, overcome powers of violence.
9. Make intelligent judgments, carry out struggles with perseverance and act with alertness.
10. Be self-confident, self-controlled, modest and generous.

(The wording can vary slightly between Vovinam schools)

A "Việt Võ Đạo Federation" was founded on November 3, 1973, in order to reunite some Vietnamese martial arts. Therefore, "Việt Võ Đạo", in Europe, is also used as a generic term for certain Vietnamese martial arts and philosophies but in Vietnam is only used to refer to "Vovinam Việt Võ Đạo".

== Belt system, the uniforms and the colors ==
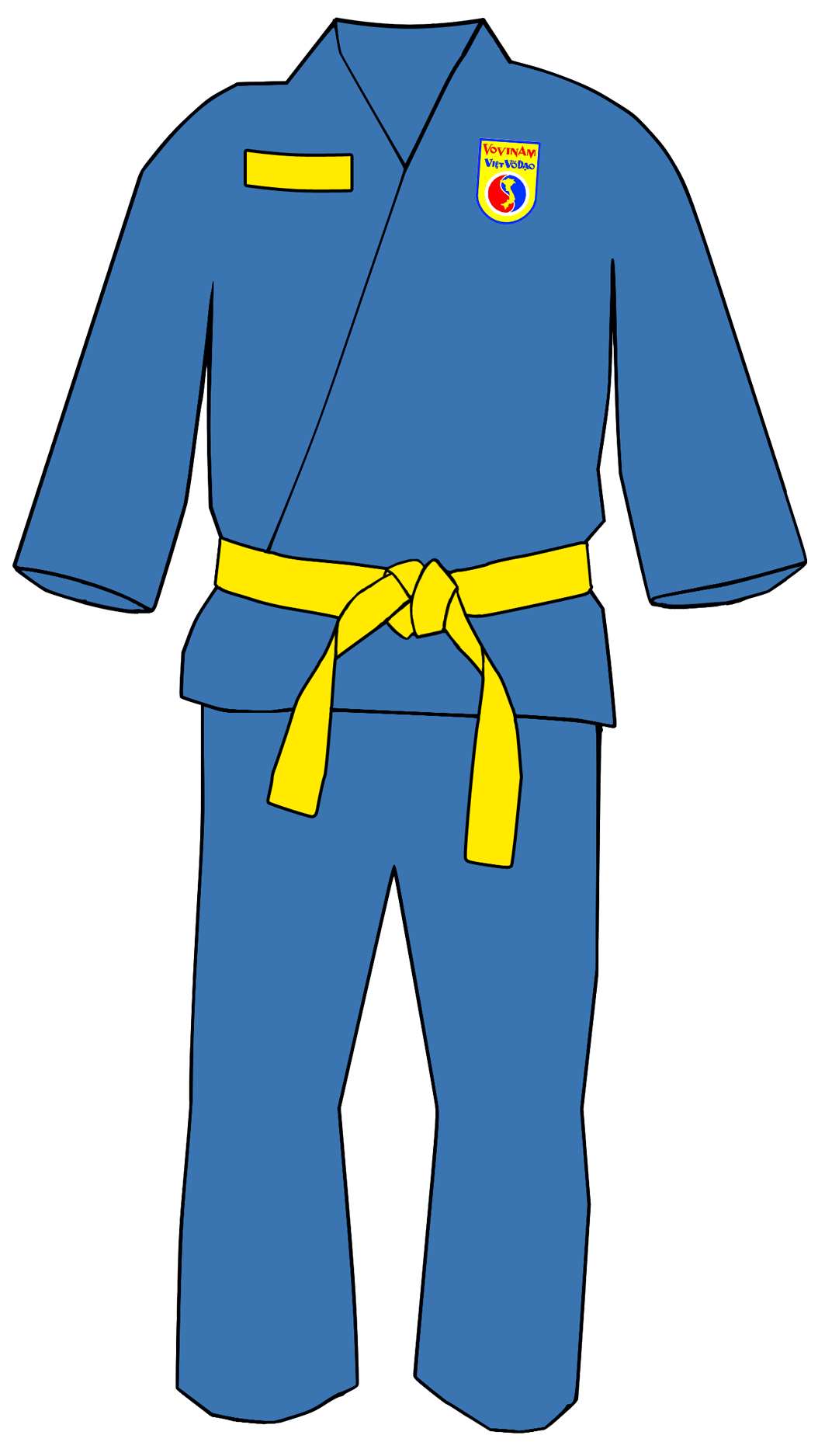
Vovinam official blue uniform or "võ phục"

=== Uniforms ===
From 1938 to 1964, there was no official uniform. Following the lifting of the ban on martial arts in Vietnam in 1963, the first Council of Vovinam-Viet Vo Dao was gathered in 1964 to codify Vovinam, establishing a rank hierarchy and uniforms and codifying the training curriculum according to rank. The color blue was adopted as the official color for Vovinam uniforms. A separate development of the "Việt Võ Đạo Federation" in 1973 until 1990 the uniforms' color was black.

In the summer of 1990, Vovinam masters from around the world met at the International Vovinam-Viet Vo Dao Conference in California with the goal of creating a structured organization for Vovinam Việt Võ Đạo outside Vietnam (the International Vovinam-Viet Vo Dao Federation). One of the decisions was that the suit in Vovinam Việt Võ Đạo were now to be blue worldwide.

=== Belts ===
Vovinam Rank Structure
Title	Tự Vệ	Nhập Môn / Lam Đai	Hoàng Đai	Hồng Đai	Bạch Đai
Rank	Novice	Practitioner	Instructor	Master	Grandmaster
Belt					

The student begins with a cyan belt—the same color as his/her suit.

Blue stands for the factor of the sea, and the hope—the hope in being successful in learning Vovinam. With the following 3 exams, yellow stripes are added to the blue belt. The 3rd yellow stripe is followed by the yellow belt.

Yellow stands for earth. In other martial arts this belt is black. Therefore, a Vovinam student who carries a yellow belt is allowed to carry a black belt. This makes a comparison to other martial arts easier, e.g. in public performances. A person who wears a yellow belt with one or more red stripes is considered an instructor.

Following in a longer period of time, respectively 3 red stripes are added to the yellow belt. This corresponds to the 1st, 2nd, respectively 3rd degree blackbelt (Đẳng). The exam following the 3rd red stripe is the master's exam. Passing the exam successfully assigns the right to wear a red belt with a circulating yellow border (4th degree blackbelt).

Red stands for the blood and the intensive flame. The student has internalized Vovinam (Việt Võ Đạo) even further. The 5th to 10th degree blackbelt are shown as a completed red belt with 1 to 6 white stripes.

White stands for the infiniteness, the bones; is the symbol of the depth of the spirit. The white belt assigns the master the absolute mastery of Vovinam Việt Võ Đạo. On the white belt thin, lengthwise stripes in blue, black, yellow and red symbolize the whole of Vovinam (Việt Võ Đạo) again. This belt is reserved for the "Chưởng Môn".

Now, Vovinam has two different sets of belt ranking because of the different training program: The WVVF Vovinam (headquarter: Vietnam) uses the traditional program and "The Vovinam-Việt Võ Đạo World Federation". (headquarter: France) uses the new training program.

=== Name plates ===
With every change of belt color the name plate color changes. Blue belt students start off with yellow text on blue name plates. With the yellow belt the name plate changes to red text on yellow ground. The red belt comes along with white text on a red name plate. The patriarch carries red text on a white name plate. Thin, colored lines in blue, yellow and red are shown on the upper and lower borders of this white name plate.

== Specialties ==
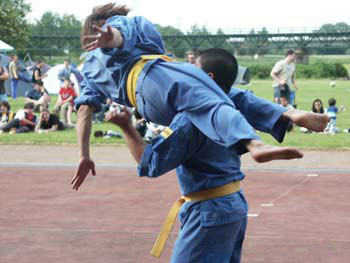
Flying scissors to the neck: the opponent is forced to the ground with a twist of the body.

Vovinam has some specialised techniques:

1. Đòn Chân Tấn Công
  A group of leg grappling techniques that is designed to grab the opponent by the feet or legs and take them down using twisting motions usable as a surprise attack in a fight. There are 21 leg grappling techniques.
2. Đấm Lao
  A backfist swung reversely to the temple.
3. Đá Cạnh
  A diagonally applied kick.

== Techniques and weapons ==
- Hand techniques (đòn tay)
- Elbow techniques (chỏ)
- Kicking techniques (đá)
- Knee techniques (gối)
- Forms (Quyền, Song Luyện, Đa Luyện)
- Attack techniques (chiến lược)
- Self-defense (tự vệ)
- Self-defense against knife attack (phản đòn dao)
- Traditional wrestling (Vật cổ truyền)
- Leg attack take-downs (đòn chân tấn công)
- Staff (côn)
- Sword (kiếm)
- Halberd (dao dài)
- Sabre (đao)
- Dagger (dao găm)
- Machete (mã tấu)
- Spear (thương)

== World Championships ==
Vovinam has Voninam World Championships since 2002 as well as Vocotruyen World Championships.

== Guardian Girls Vovinam ==
The World Vovinam Federation (WVVF) officially signed a global Memorandum of Understanding with Guardian Girls International (GGI) in Hanoi, Vietnam, on September 16, 2025. Through this partnership, WVVF joined GGI in launching Guardian Girls Vovinam (GGV), a global initiative dedicated to advancing gender equality and protecting women and girls from violence through the practice and values of Vovinam.

== See also ==
- Võ Thuật
- Võ thuật Bình Định
- Vietnamese martial arts
- Silat
- Chinese martial arts
