= Dubok =

Dubok may refer to:

- Dobok, Korean martial arts uniform.
- Dubok (camouflage), a camouflage pattern used (formerly) by the USSR and some Post-Soviet states.
