= Phuc =

Phuc (Phúc with diacritics) can refer to:

== People ==
- Phan Thi Kim Phuc
- Đặng Hữu Phúc (born 1953) is a Vietnamese pianist and composer best known for his film scores
- Nguyễn Phúc Luân (阮福㫻, 1733–1765) was a son of lord Nguyễn Phúc Khoát and father of Nguyễn Phúc Ánh
- Nguyễn Xuân Phúc (born 1954) is a Vietnamese politician and President of Vietnam

== Places ==
- Phúc Yên Air Base
- Vĩnh Phúc Province

== Others ==
- Trần Ngọc Gia Phúc (武服), a Vietnamese term that refers to a martial arts uniform
