= Keikogi =

Training uniform in Japanese martial arts

Keikogi (稽古着) (keiko, 'practice', gi, 'dress' or 'clothes'), also known as dōgi (道着) or keikoi (稽古衣), (Note: In English, the keikogi is almost always referred to simply as gi, a technically incorrect use of the word in Japanese, but colloquially understood in context. Often, the keiko- portion of the word is replaced with the name of the Japanese martial art being practiced. In Russian, Polish, French and Brazilian Portuguese this kind of uniform is often called a kimono.) is a traditional uniform worn for training in Japanese martial arts and their derivatives. Emerging in the late 19th century, the keikogi was developed by judo founder Kanō Jigorō.

== Origin ==
Japanese martial arts historian Dave Lowry speculates that Kanō derived the uniform's design from the uniforms of Japanese firefighters' heavy hemp jackets, hikeshi banten (半纏). By 1920, the keikogi as it exists today was worn by Kanō's students for judo practice; a photo displayed in the Kodokan (judo headquarters) taken in 1920 shows Kanō himself wearing a modern keikogi.

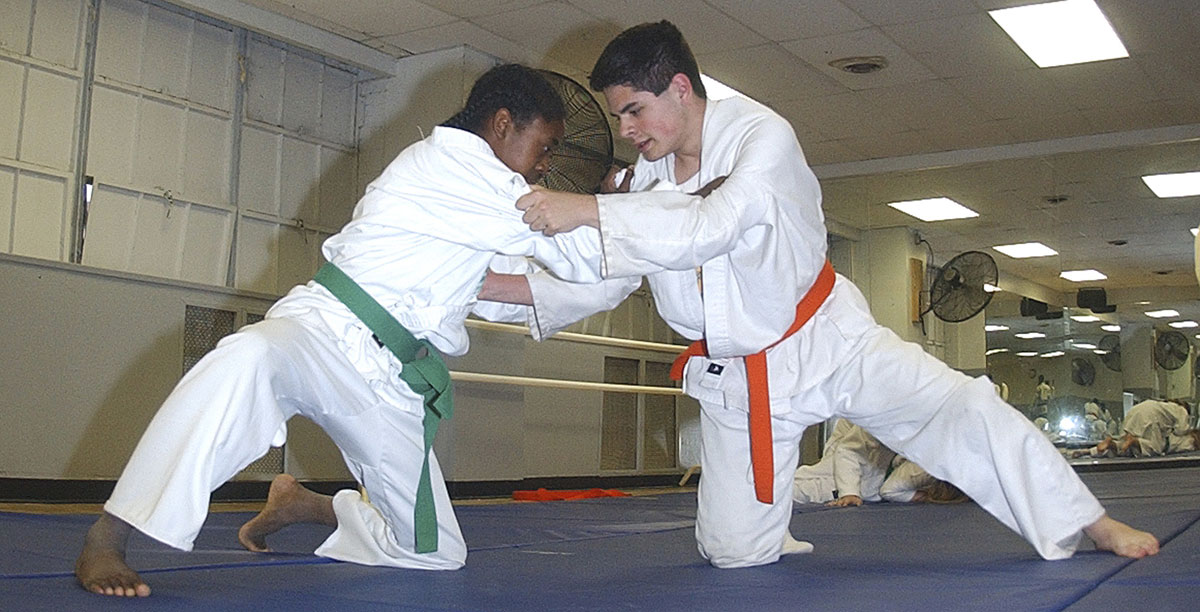
Two judoka wearing judogi

Until the 1920s, Okinawan karate practice was usually performed in everyday clothes. Given the social climate between the Japanese and Okinawans during this time, karate was seen as brutish compared to Japanese martial arts, which had their roots in samurai culture, such as jujutsu. To help market karate to the Japanese, Gichin Funakoshi – the founder of Shotokan karate and the instructor responsible for importing karate to mainland Japan – adopted a uniform style similar to Kanō's design.

== Construction ==
Over time, karate practitioners modified the keikogi for karate by lightening the weave of the fabric, and adding strings to the inside of the jacket, tied to keep the jacket closed. The jacket is also held closed by a belt or obi.

The top part of the keikogi is called the uwagi (上着, 'upper'). The trousers of the keikogi are called shitabaki (下穿き, lit. 'underpants'), or zubon (ズボン, 'trousers').

In modern times, white, black, blue and indigo are the most common colours of keikogi. In competitive judo, one contestant wears a white uniform, and their opponent wears a royal blue one. However, traditionally, the keikogi was white in all instances.

Commonly used keikogi include:

- Aikidogi (合気道着/合気道衣), aikido uniform)
- Brazilian Jiu-Jitsu gi/kimono (Brazilian Jiu-Jitsu uniform)
- Dobok, Korean martial arts uniform
- Judogi (柔道着/柔道衣), judo uniform
- Jujutsugi (柔術着/柔術衣), jujutsu uniform
- Karategi (空手着/空手衣), karate uniform
- Kendogi (剣道着/剣道衣) kendo uniform, consisting of an uwagi and a hakama
- Sambovka (Самбовка) Sambo uniform
- Võ phục, Vietnamese martial arts uniform

Keiko can also be replaced by dō, meaning 'the way', referring to both the martial art and the lifestyle of the martial artist. In this, it is similar to the term for Korean martial arts uniforms, dobok.

== Keikogi materials ==
- Single weave: A lighter material, cooler for use in the summer.
- Double weave: A very thick material, not as cool as other weaves.
- Gold weave: Between a single and double weave thickness; gold weave was initially required by the International Brazilian Jiu-Jitsu Federation in order to standardize dogi for competitions.
- Platinum weave: Lighter than gold weave, cooler for use in the summer.
