= Shitagi =

Shirt worn by samurai

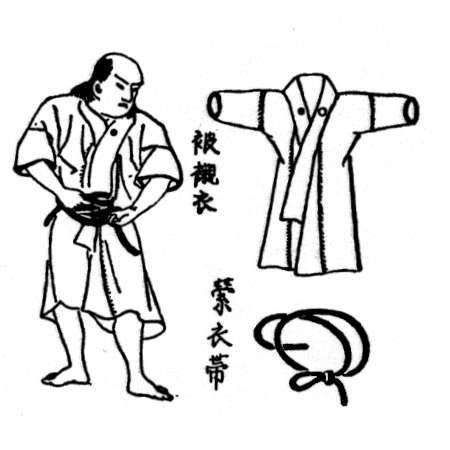
Antique Japanese wood block print of a samurai putting on a shitagi

Outside of Japan, shitagi (下着, lit. "under clothing") (also gusoku shita) refers to a type of shirt worn by the Samurai class of feudal Japan when they were wearing full armour. In the common and modern use of Japanese language, however, "shitagi" just means underwear.

The shitagi was the second garment to be put on, coming second only to the Fundoshi (Japan loincloth). The shitagi was like a short kimono with a button at the neck and a thin attached waist cord (obi).

There are several types of shitagi. The shitagi would be put on as though it were a kimono, the left hand being put first into its sleeve, and then the right, the neck would then button, and the waist cord tie at the back.

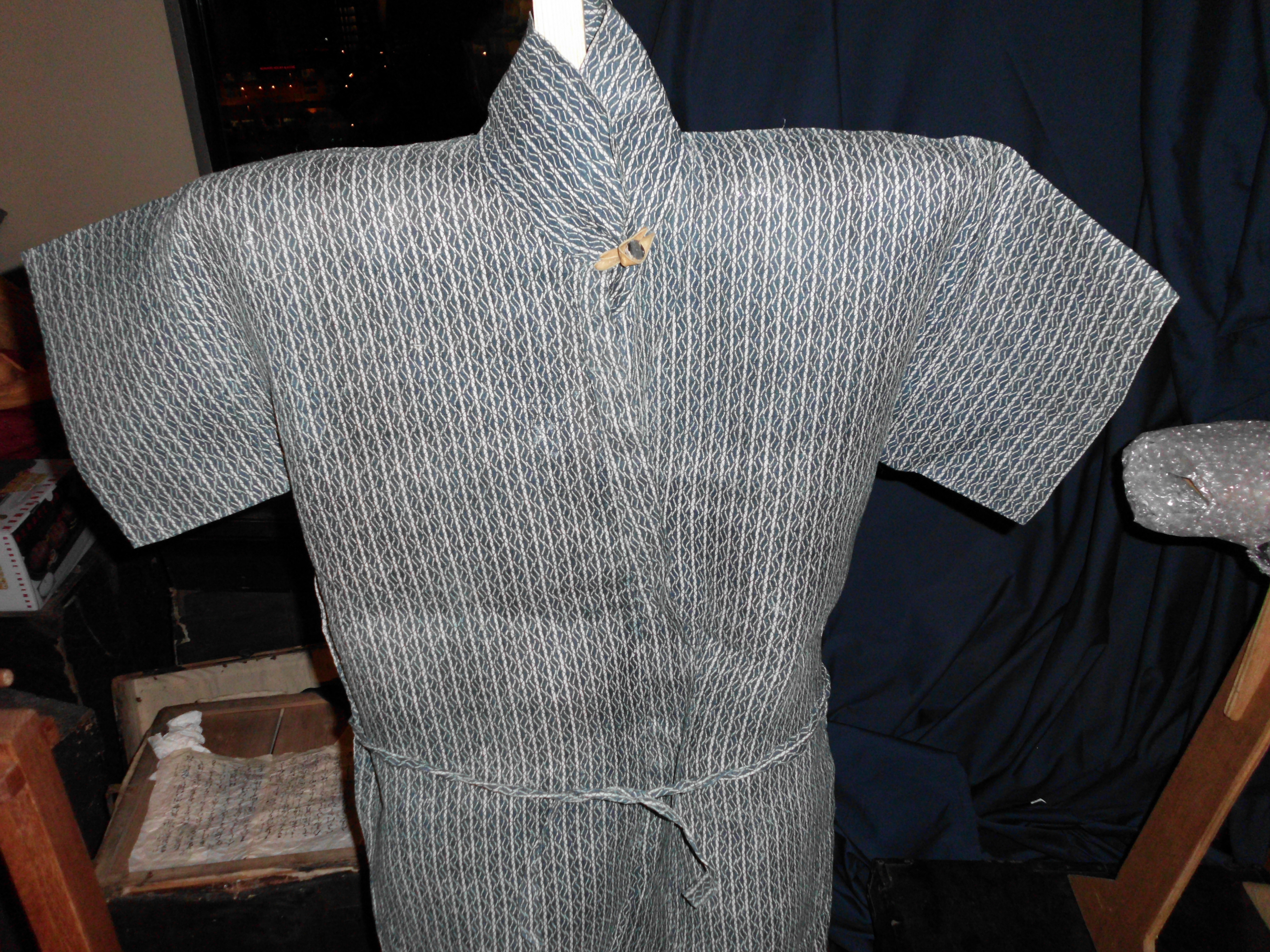

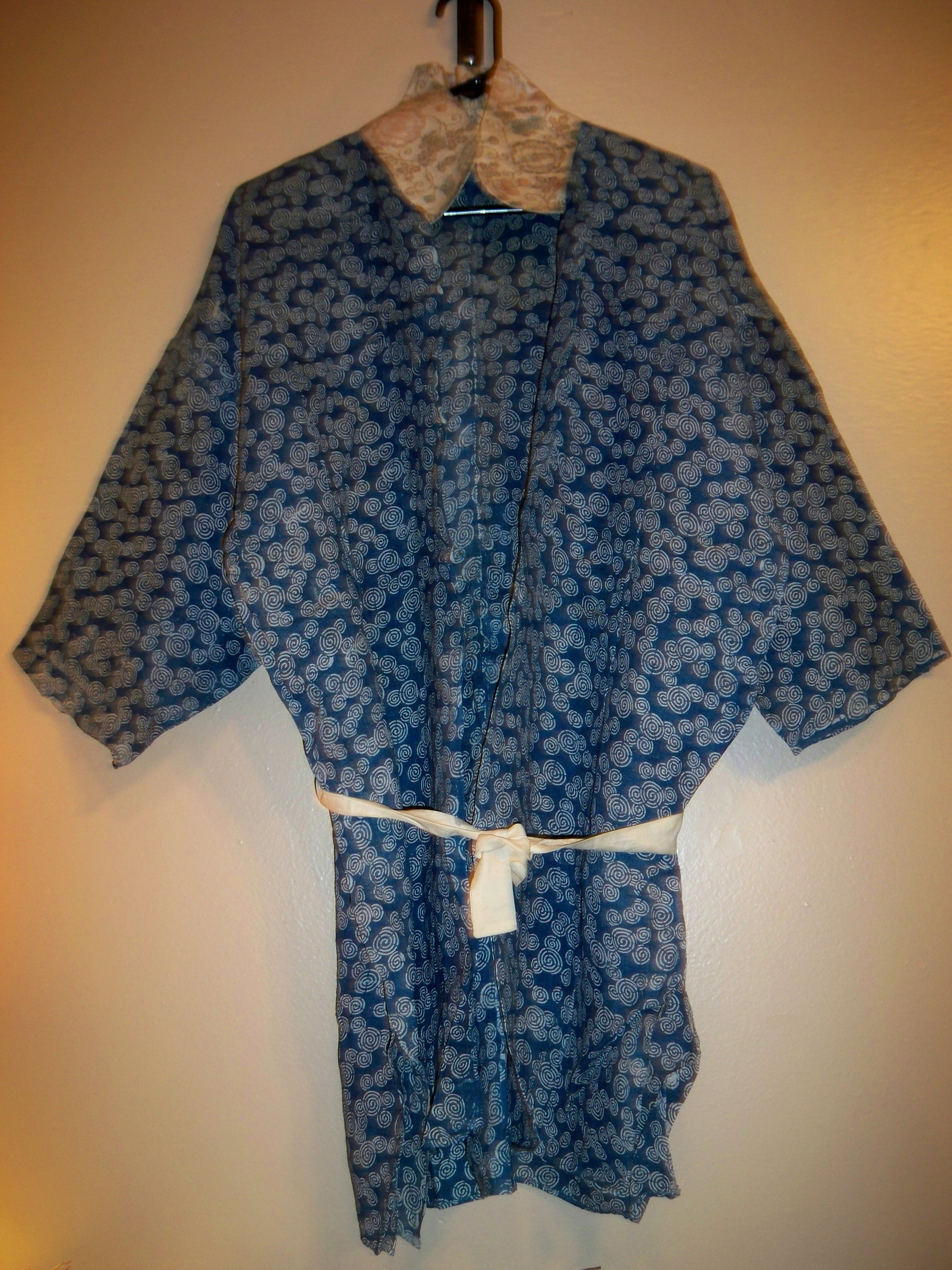

== See also ==
- Keikogi
- Uwagi
