= Việt Võ Đạo =

Việt Võ Đạo may refer to:

- the philosophy of Vovinam
- Vietnamese martial arts in general
