= Qwan Ki Do =

Vietnamese martial art

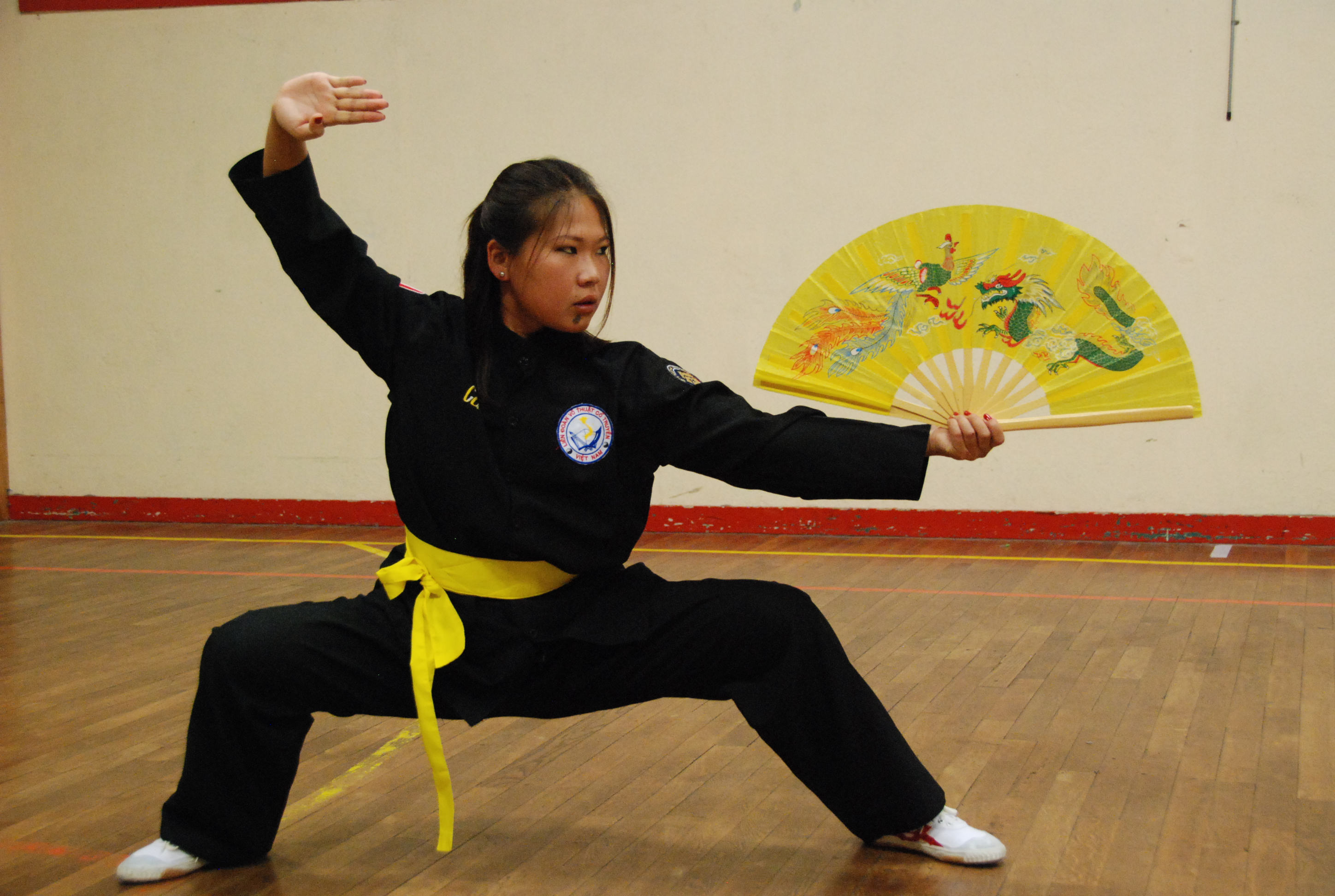
- Carole Bo Ram Autret demonstrating Qwan Ki Do on 29 September 2014
- Focus: Hand-to-hand combat
- Hardness: Full contact
- Country of origin: France and Vietnam
- Date of formation: 1981
- Creator: Pham Xuan Tong
- Ancestor arts: Shaolin Kung Fu, Viet Vo Dao
- Descendant arts: Cuong Qwan Ki Do
- Meaning: The Body's Energy Path or Fist and Energy Way

Qwan Ki Do or Quán Khí Đạo is a Vietnamese martial art that was codified in France in 1981. Qwan Ki Do is practiced internationally, with schools in Asia and Europe. The practice combines the use of hand-to-hand techniques and weapons, with moves combined in both formalised combinations, termed Thao Quyen, and freeform settings. Qwan Ki Do includes stances, punches, kicks, throws, holds and many other techniques. Weapon moves include the traditional sword art of Viet Lon Guom. Practitioners can progress through three levels, called So Dang, Trung Dang and Thuong Dang or Nhap Man, Trung Man and Dai Man, at which different coloured belts are worn. As well as improving physical attributes like strength and flexibility in adults, the practice has been shown to help promote good mental health in children.

== History ==
Qwan Ki Do or Quan khi Dao was founded by Pham Xuan Tong in France in 1981. The name can be translated either "The Body's Energy Path" or "Fist and Energy Way". There are two traditions to explain its formation. In one, it is derived from traditional Vietnamese Viet Vo Dao martial arts, and particularly Vo Binh Dinh, Vo Quang Binh and Vo Bach Ninh. In the other, it is derived from the Chinese Wo Mei, a Southern Shaolin Kung Fu style. In this tradition, the main techniques are derived from the animal forms of the crane, praying mantis and tiger. The practice of Cuong Qwan Ki Do, which became independent in 1995, was developed from it.

The art has spread to many countries in Europe and Asia. The first Qwan Ki Do association in Germany, the Qwan Ki Do Cottbus eV, was founded in 1992 in Cottbus, by the Congolese athlete Jean Isidore Dziengué. In 2003, a Romanian from Suceava, Dorin Cazac, opened the first Qwan-Ki-Do Club in Ireland, in Nenagh. In 2009, Irina Adam, another Romanian, set up a school in London, and second soon following and, in 2012, a third. There are many schools in India. Over 1,000 competitors took part in the national championships in Aurangabad in 2020.

== Practice ==
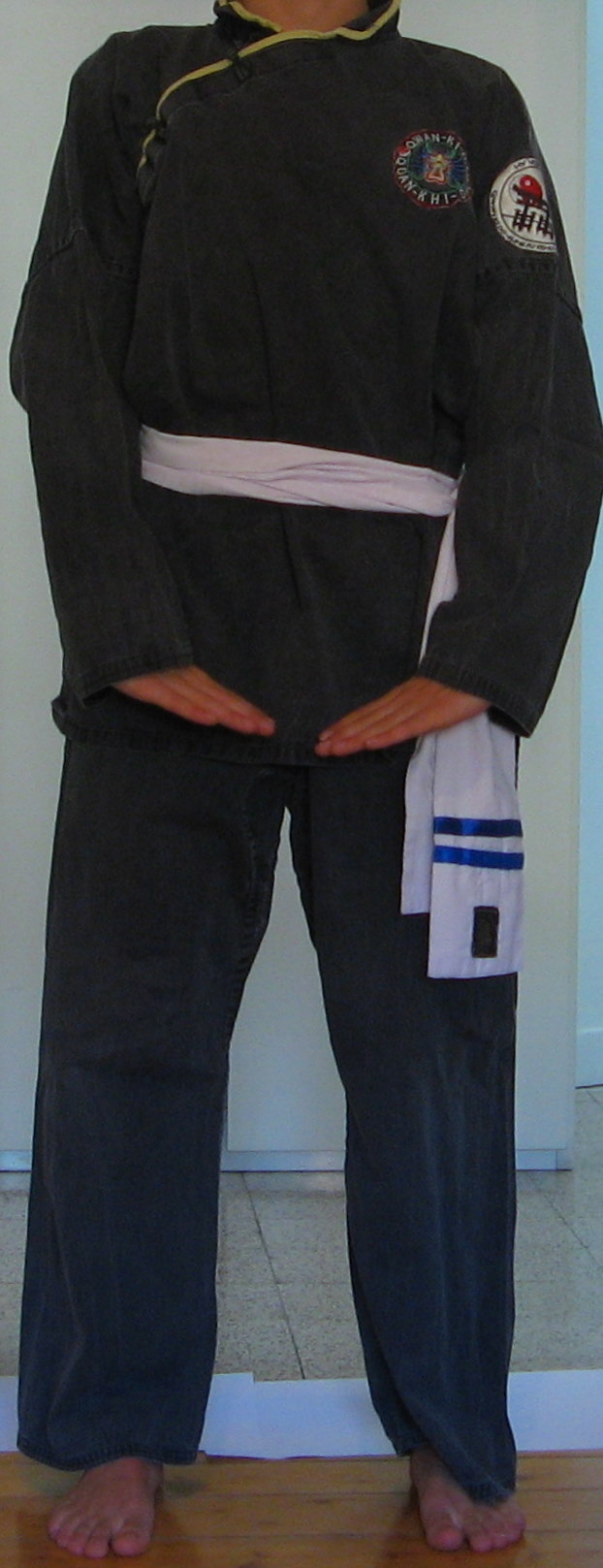
The Qwan Ki Do uniform

Qwan Ki Do is primarily a method of hand-to-hand combat, often using acrobatic manoeuvres, but also includes the use of weapons. Practicing the art is complex, combining mental and physical exercises. The basic techniques include:

- Bo Phap (stances)
- Than Phap (movement)
- Thu Phap (punches and other hand techniques)
- Cuoc Phap (kicks and other foot techniques)
- Cung Phu (blocking)
- Nhao Tan (falls)
- Vat (throws)
- Tao Dia Cuoc (sweeps)
- Cam Na (holds)
- Khoa Go (joint locks)
- Tu Ve (self defence)
- Co Vo Dao (the use of weapons)

The practice includes codified series of moves undertaken solo termed Thao Quyen. Some sequences are named, such as Thap Thu, a combination of ten steps. Along with the basic techniques and assaults (Song Quyen, Song Doi and Song Dau), these form the three pillars of the martial art. The techniques themselves may also have complex taxonomies. For example, the use of hands and arms can be divided into both direct and circular strikes, the former including moves like Thoi Son, a form of forward punch, and the latter includes Thoi Son Ban Ha, in which one arm rotates vertically while the other moves downwards with the palm facing sideways. The weapons used originate from both China and Vietnam and include sticks, pole-arms and blades. The sword art of Viet Lon Guom is included in the practice.

Progression in the martial art is through three levels:

- So Dang or Nhap Man – the inauguration
- Trung Dang or Trung Man – medium level
- Thuong Dang or Dai Man – high level

A person at So Dang level wears a white belt symbolising purity and the absence of knowledge. A person at Trung Dang can wear a black belt, while one who achieves Thuong Dang can wear a red and white belt with a yellow border.

== Benefits ==
In addition to the self-defence benefits of the martial arts, a study published in the Timişoara Physical Education and Rehabilitation Journal showed that the practice improved the motor ability of lower limbs. It has also been shown to improve the aerobic capacity, balance, strength, body weight, and flexibility of practitioners, both elite athletes and elderly amateurs. A positive effect has also been reported on the mental health of children, based on the emphasis on a moral code, respect, self-confidence, self-control, self-determination, social interaction and teamwork.
