= MM-14 =

Ukrainian camouflage pattern since 2014

MM-14 pattern
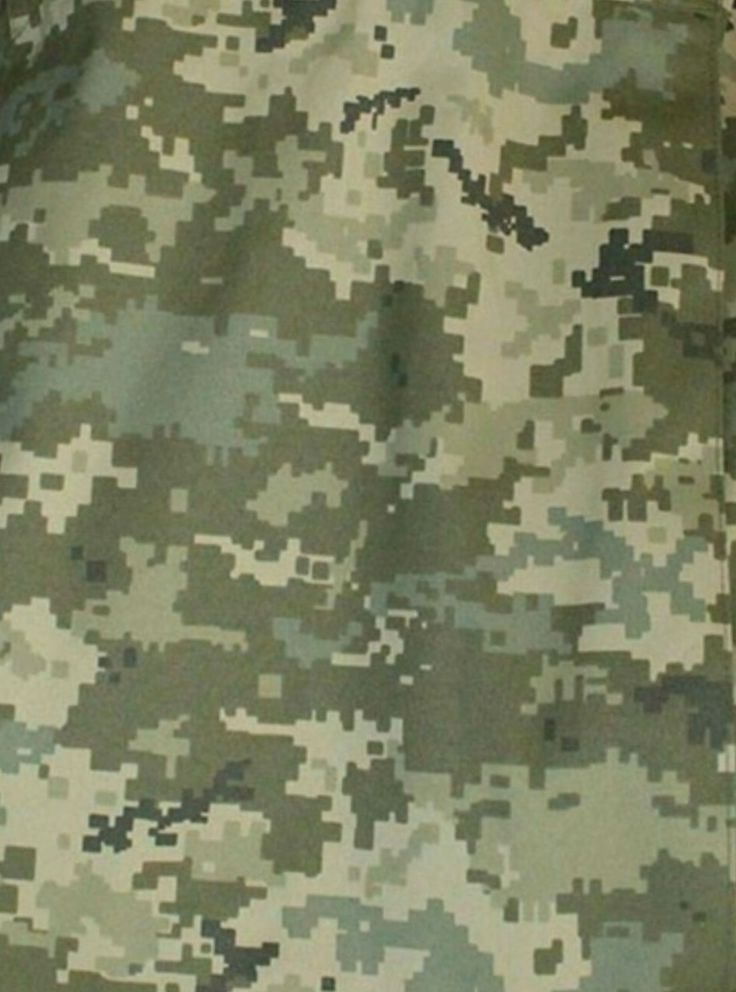
- MM-14 Camouflage
- Type: Military camouflage pattern
- Place of origin: Ukraine

Service history
- In service: 2014-Present
- Wars: Russo-Ukrainian War; Russian invasion of Crimea; War in Donbas; Russian invasion of Ukraine

Production history
- Designer: NFM Group (Initial); PROF1 Group (Current)
- Designed: 2014
- Manufacturer: PROF1 Group
- Produced: 2014–present
- Variants: See Variants

The MM-14, also sometimes referred to as Pixel or "Poroh-1" (Ukrainian: Порох-1, lit. 'Gunpowder-1') and Ukrainian pixel, is a digital camouflage pattern used by the Armed Forces of Ukraine since 2014.

== History ==
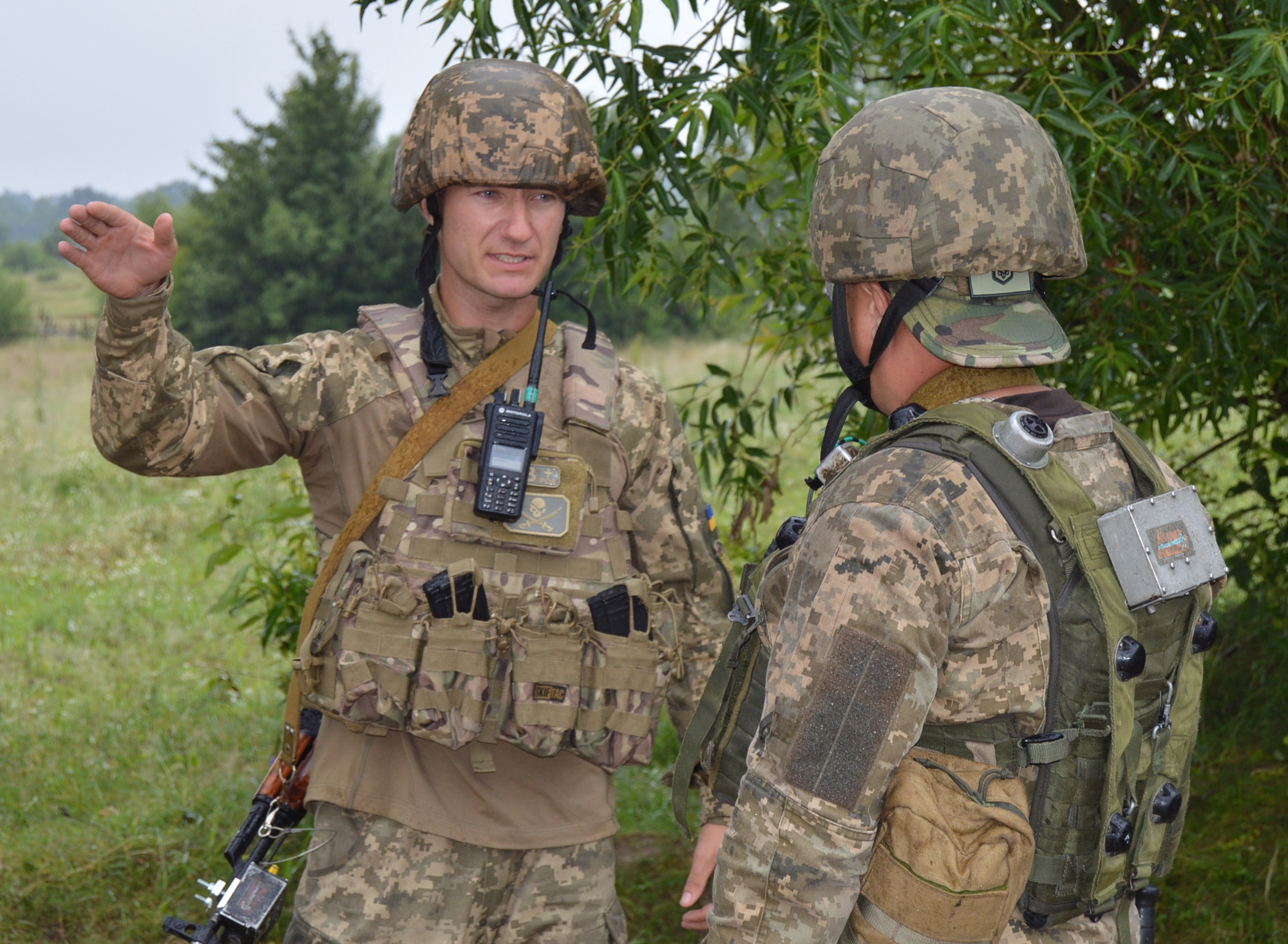
Ukrainian soldiers with MM-14 uniforms at the Rapid Trident 2016 military exercises

MM-14 was first seen in use by Ukrainian special forces and air assault units in 2014, It has since been adopted widely throughout the Ukrainian military.

Early batches of MM-14 uniforms produced by European military equipment manufacturer NFM Group were found to be highly flammable. Along with this problem, the pattern also had a tendency to fade when exposed to sunlight for long periods of time. This led to the Ukrainian military choosing Kyiv-based tactical clothing company PROF1 Group to manufacture the redesigned uniforms, with a different material used in production.

In August 2014, the camouflage was presented to the public at Odesa. In December 2014, fabric and equipment samples in the pattern were presented to Ukrainian officials.

In July 2015, the Ukrainian Ministry of Defense approved MM-14 camouflage for standard issue to the Ukrainian Armed Forces. It replaced all Dubok uniforms in use.

In August 2025, it was announced that a Multicam-based pattern was going to begin standardization as an optional alternative to MM-14. The new pattern is called MM-25.

In late 2025, a Chinese-produced copy of MM-14 was observed in limited service with Taliban security forces in Afghanistan.

== Design ==
MM-14 camouflage has a five-tone digital pattern of light beige, light green, swamp green, gray green, and dark gray. This color scheme and pattern was designed specifically to work well in the Donetsk and Kherson regions of Ukraine. Some more recent versions of MM-14 incorporate greenish swatches to better accommodate woodland environments.

The State Border Guard Service of Ukraine uses a version of the MM-14 with dark green camo patterns.

== Variants ==
=== MM-14 ===
The basic variant.

=== MM-16F ===
A naval version of the MM-14 has been used by the Ukrainian Navy since 2016. It has a blue-dominant blue, gray, and black color palette.

== Users ==
- Afghanistan: Chinese copy in limited use with the Taliban.
- Ukraine: In use with the Armed Forces of Ukraine.

== Gallery ==
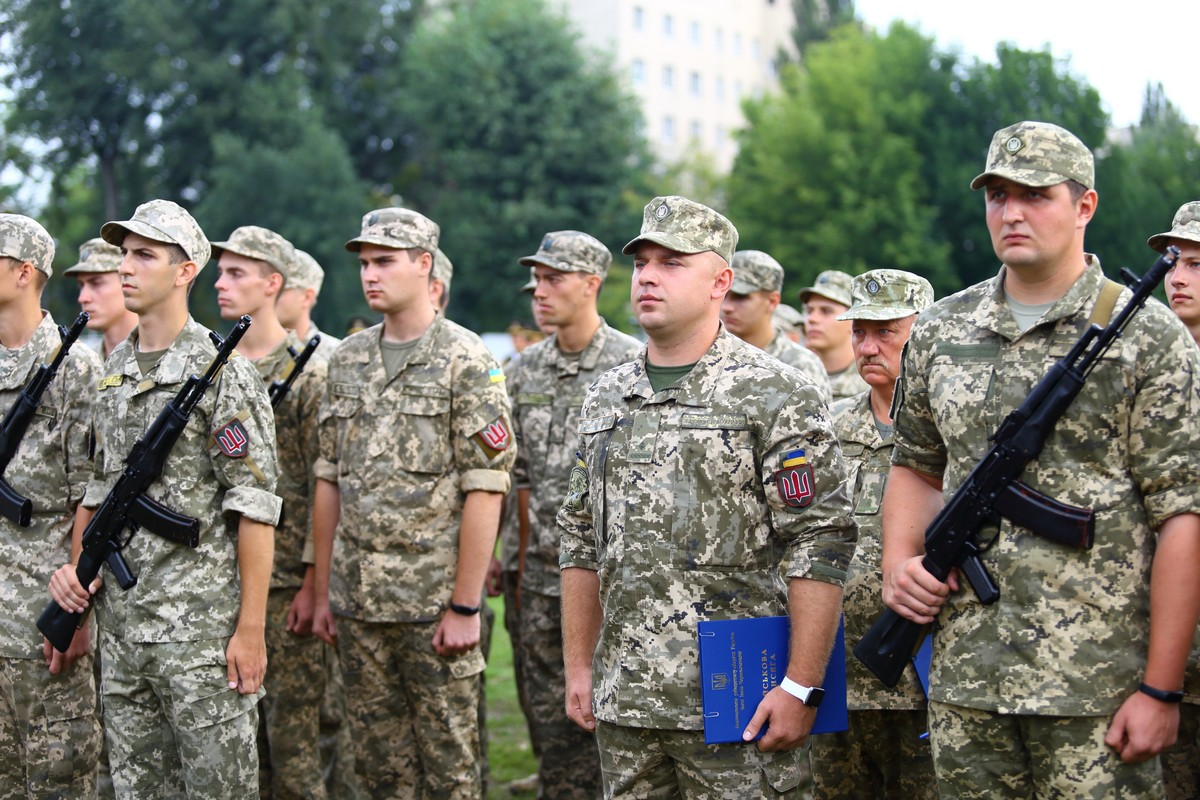
Ukrainian military cadets wearing MM-14

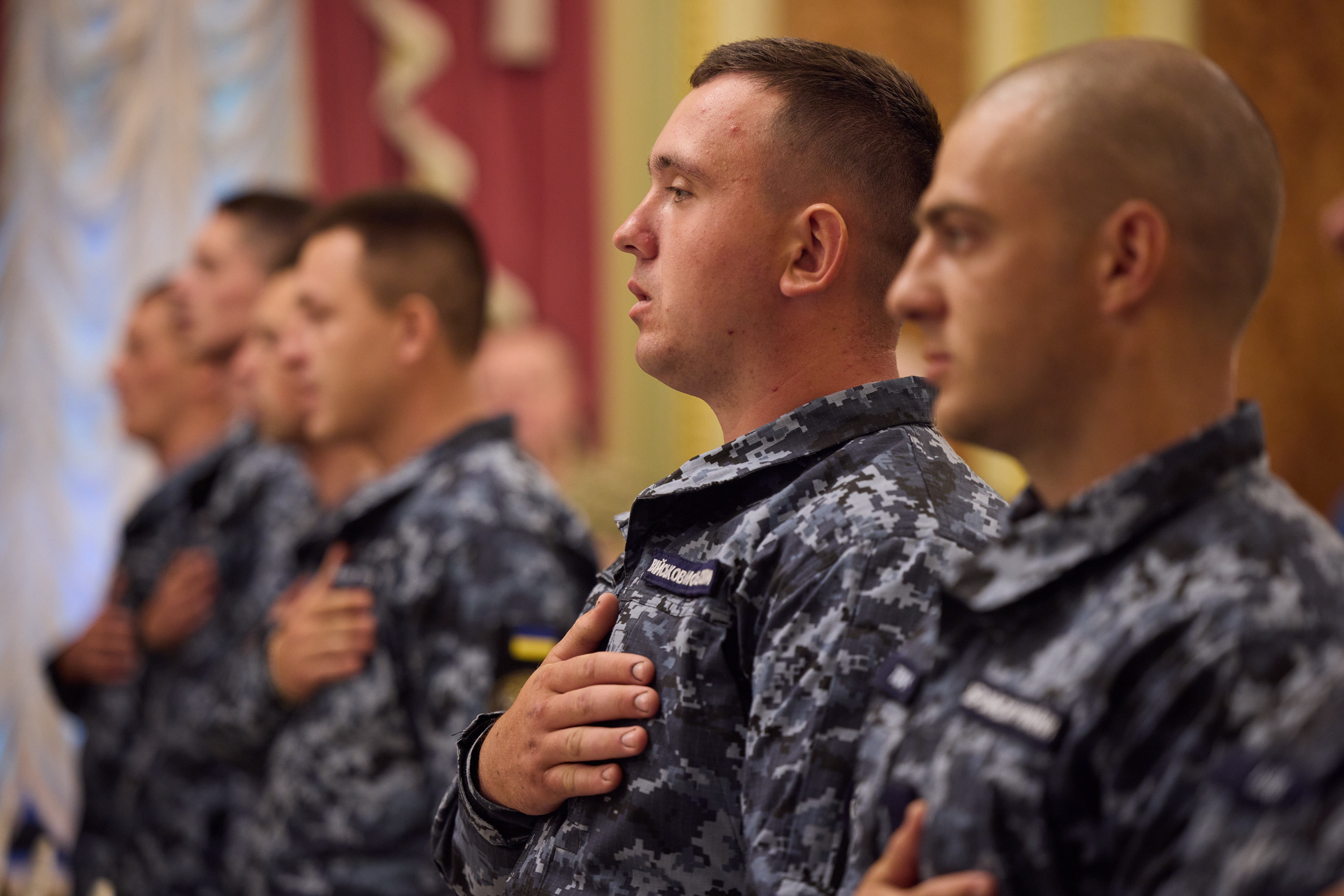
Ukrainian Navy sailors wearing MM-16F

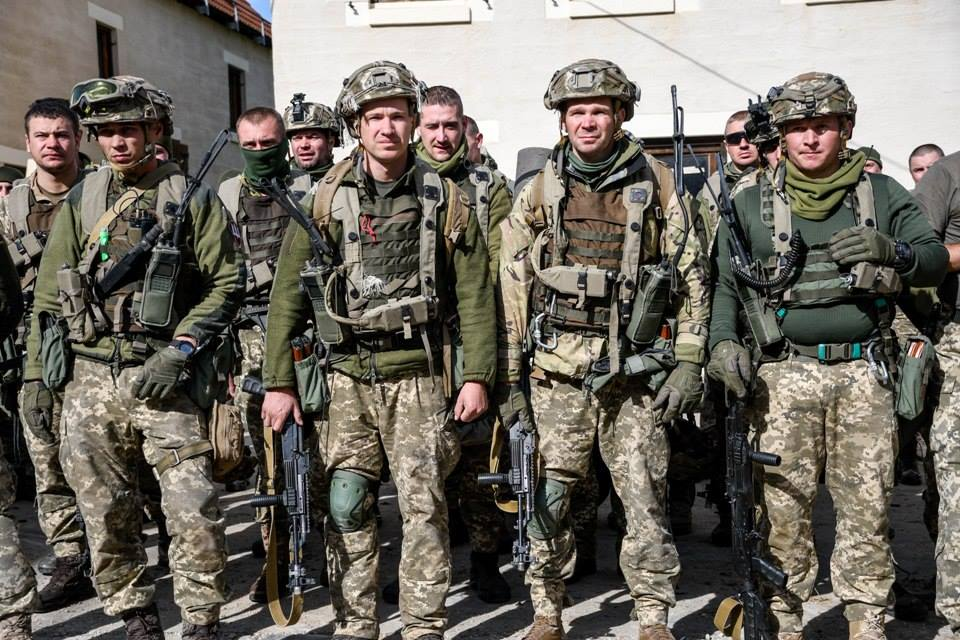
Ukrainian Air Assault Forces paratroopers with complete battle gear in MM-14

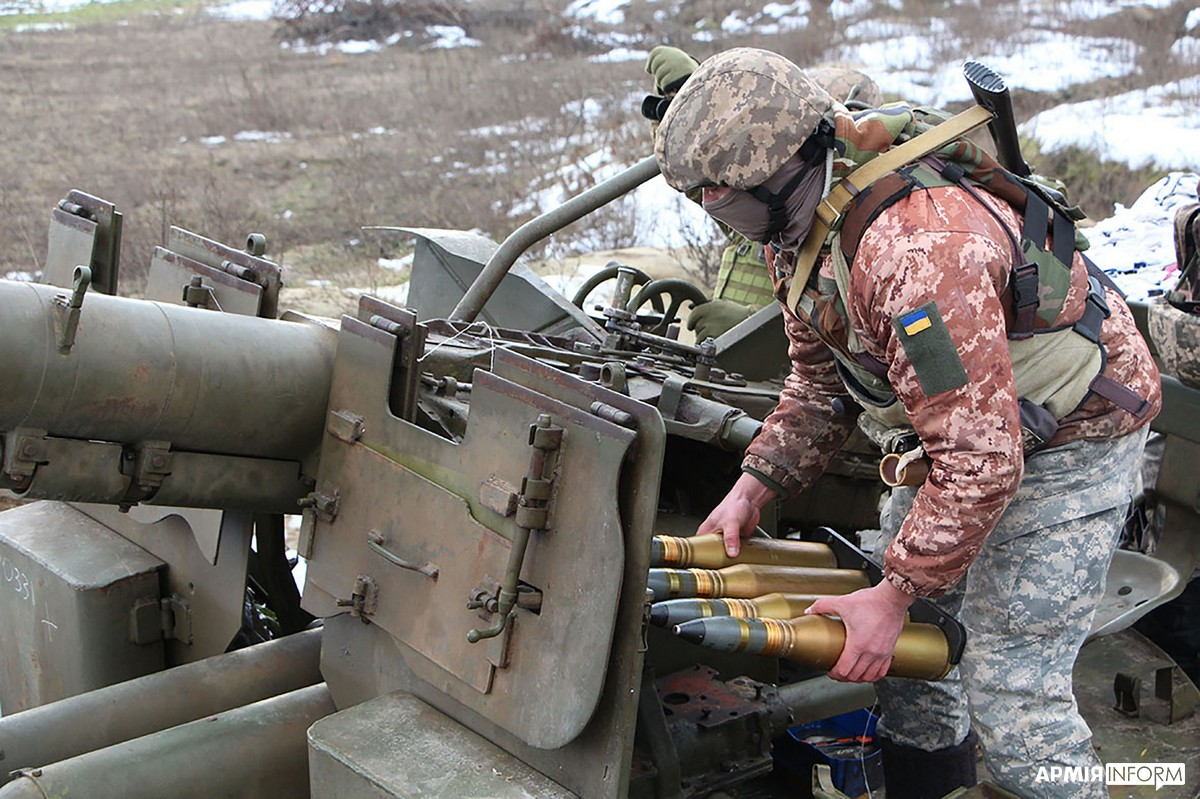
Territorial Defence Force soldier wearing a red-tinted variant of the MM-14
