= Uwagi =

Kimono-like jacket worn in Japan

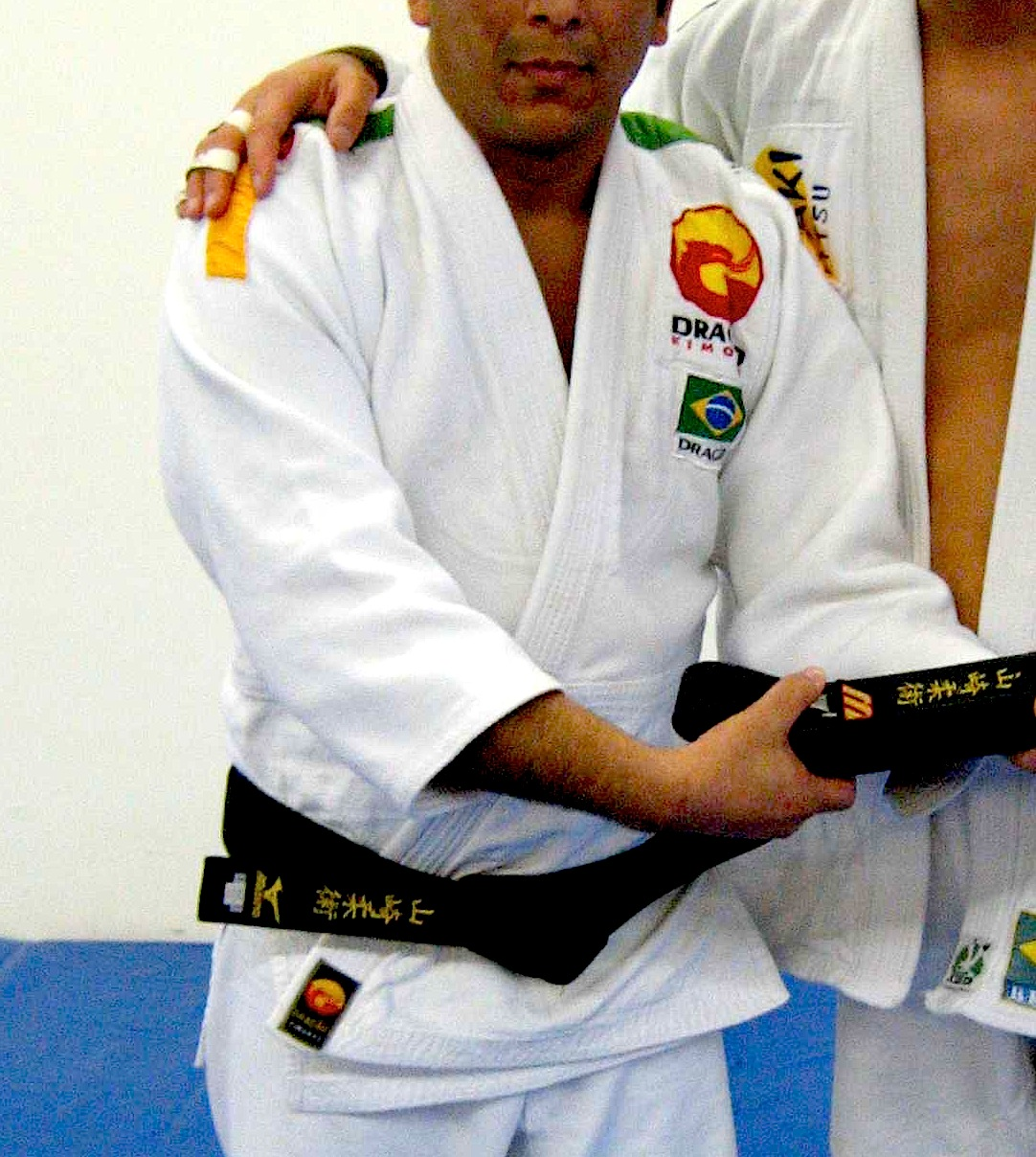
A jujutsu uwagi being worn.

Outside of Japan, an uwagi (上着/上衣) means a kimono-like jacket worn in Japan. It is believed to be most familiar as the top half of a martial arts uniform.

The third element, the obi, ties the uwagi closed.

In some martial arts, the set is completed with hakama, which might be worn over, or instead of the zubon.

In the common and modern use of Japanese language, however, "uwagi" just means an outerwear or tops.

== See also ==
- Keikogi
- Shitagi
