= Võ phục =

Vietnamese term for martial arts uniform

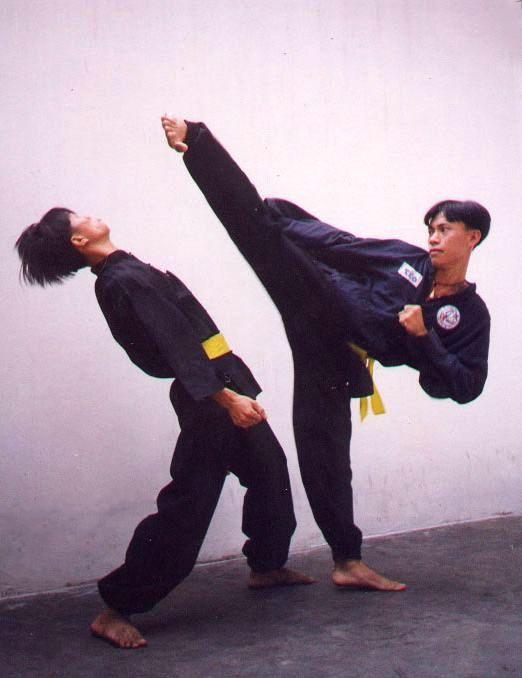
Tân Khánh Bà Trà practitioners wearing black colored võ phục

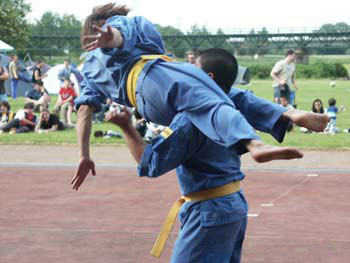
Vovinam practitioners wearing typical blue/indigo colored võ phục of Vovinam while practicing Vietnamese martial arts

Võ phục (Chữ Hán: 武服) is a Vietnamese term that refers to a martial arts uniform (which may include a ranking belt), mainly associated with Vietnamese martial arts, particularly Vovinam.

== Usage ==
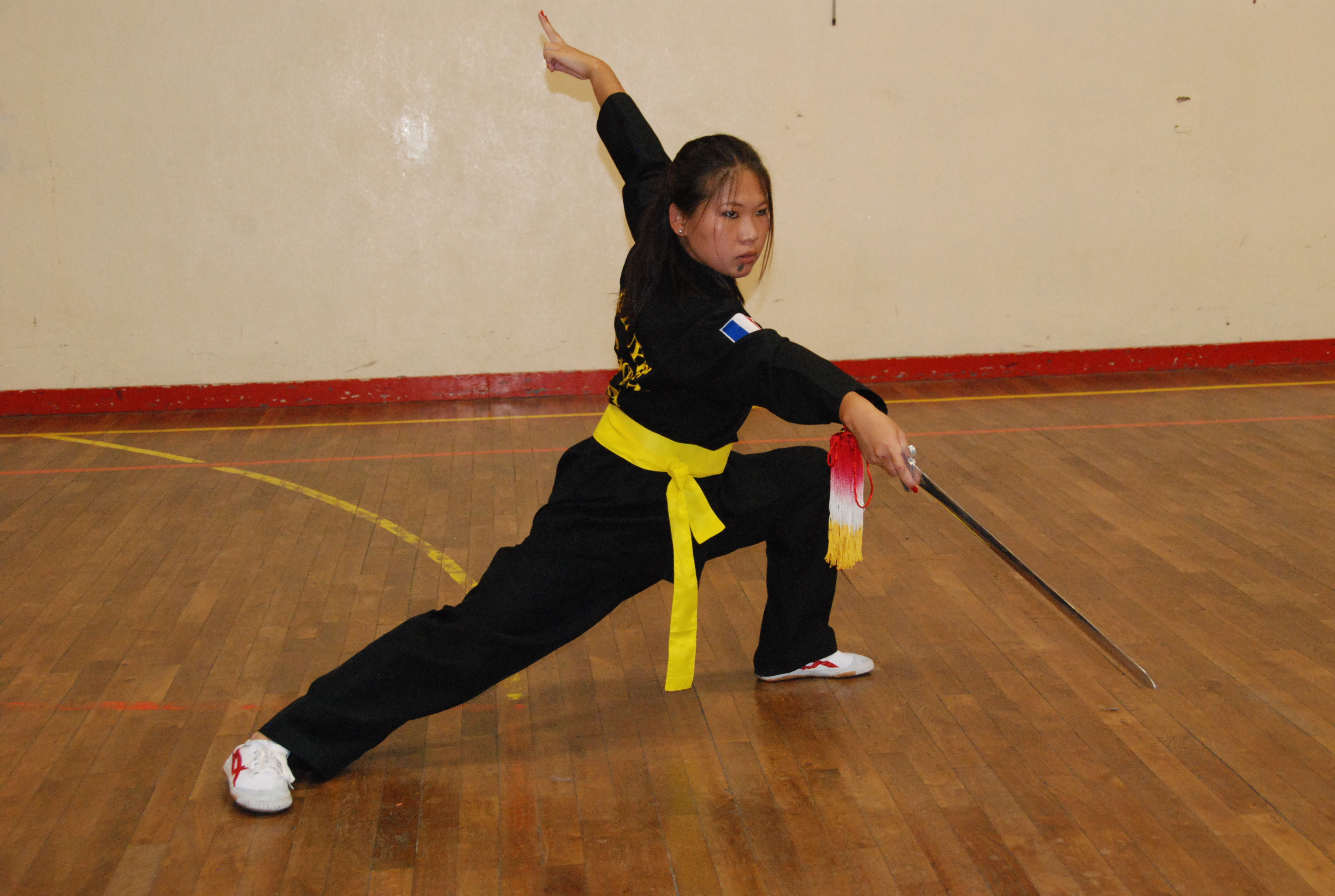
Võ Cổ truyền's võ phục

The term võ phục may be used alone in the context of Vietnamese martial arts or often to refer to the martial arts suit worn by practitioners of Vovinam. The Vietnamese alphabet pronunciation (and writing) of the word võ phục differs from another common Vietnamese term vô phúc (無福) "bad luck".

=== Usage with other martial art forms ===
Võ phục may be used before the accepted name of another martial art in order to refer to the uniform of that particular martial art. For example, võ phục Judo refers to the martial arts uniform used in Judo, known in Japanese as a jūdōgi (wikt:柔道着). The term functions in the same way as "martial arts uniform of" in English: võ phục (martial arts uniform of) Judo.

=== History ===
From 1938 to 1964, there was no official coloration associated with võ phục. However, after a meeting between Vietnamese martial arts masters in 1964, indigo/deep blue was chosen to be the official color of Vietnamese martial arts uniforms.

The official color was not necessarily adopted by all practitioners, as evidenced throughout 1973-1990 when many practitioners under a separate development of Vovinam, the "Viet Vo Dao Federation" wore black uniforms. By 1990, however, after further meetings between councils, indigo had been adopted by the majority of Vovinam practitioners in and outside of Vietnam. Deep blue/indigo (Vietnamese: Lam) is now the internationally accepted color of Vo Phuc for Vietnamese martial arts.

== Construction ==
The võ phục of Vovinam are very similar, if not nearly identical, to the keikogi of Japanese martial arts. Both top and bottom of the uniform are constructed in much the same way as keikogi, and the two are likely interchangeable if not for obvious differences in coloration.

The thickness of võ phục varies by school, preference, or size of a practitioner.

== Wearing ==
As with the Japanese keikogi, the võ phục top should be worn with the left front panel tied over the right. Pants are worn the same way as Japanese keikogi pants, and are adjusted according to the preference of the practitioner by loosening or tightening the appropriate fitting cords provided.

== Belt ==
The võ phục is often worn with the corresponding ranking belt (Vietnamese wikt:đai, wikt:帶) of the practitioner around the waist. Belts worn with võ phục for Vovinam are similar to those of Japanese martial arts in that they are constructed using the same techniques and materials.

== See also ==
- Vovinam
- Keikogi (Leads to: Judogi, Karategi, etc.)
- Dobok
