= Võ thuật Bình Định =

Martial art

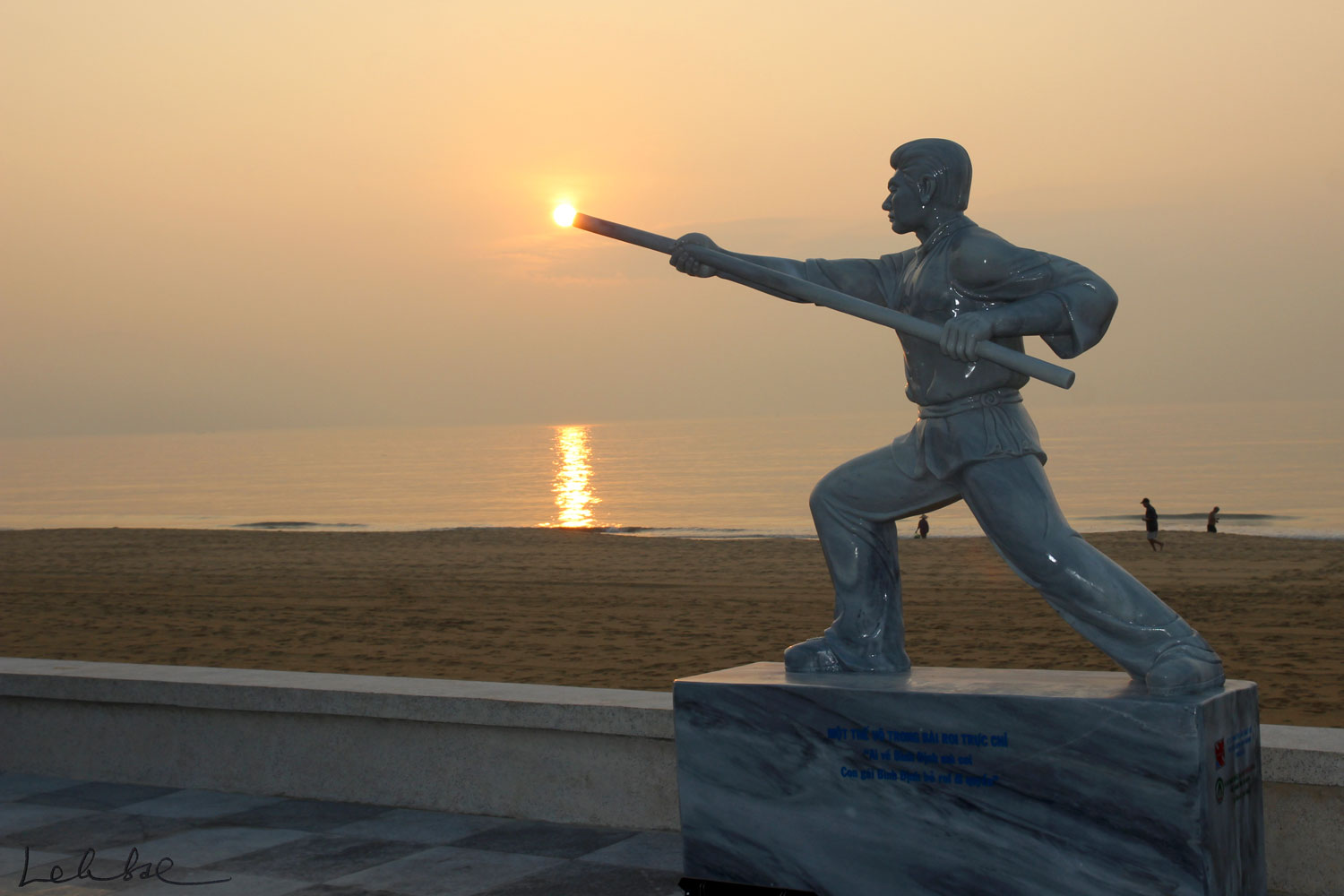
A statue honoring. Võ Bình Định in Quy Nhơn

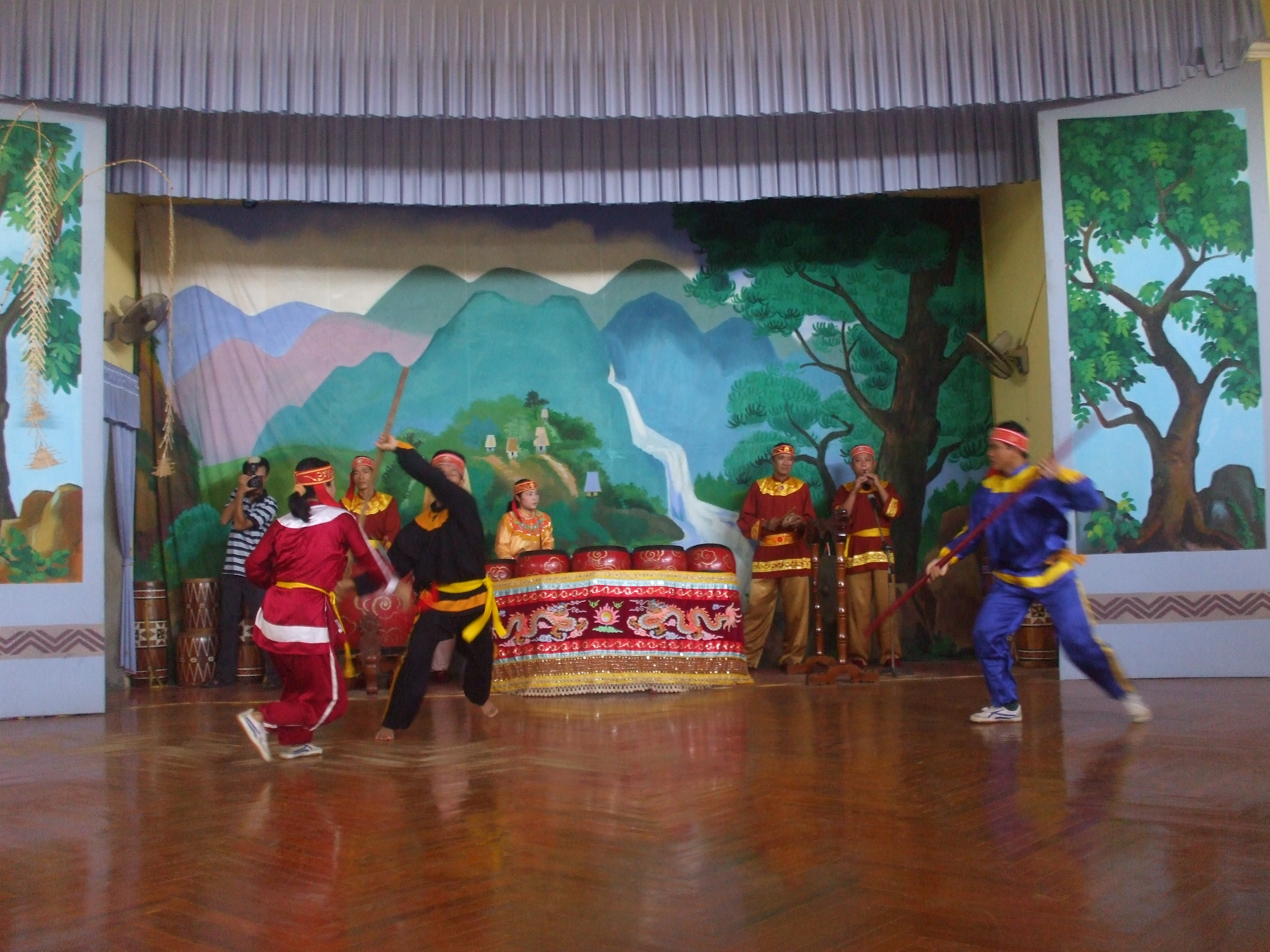
Display of võ thuật Bình Định

Võ Bình Định (Chữ Hán: 武平定) (short for võ thuật Bình Định 武術平定, martial arts of Bình Định Province, now is Gia Lai province) is a regional form of martial arts in Vietnam.

Any martial art developed in Tỉnh (state or province), before merge with Gia Lai, Bình Định is called Võ Bình Định. There are 11 huyện (counties or districts) in the Bình Định Region that practice martial arts. These include villages and cities within each country that contain styles ranging anywhere from 100 to 600 years old.

== History ==
Bình Định is the Capital of Martial Arts in Vietnam as Foshan is the Capital of Martial Arts in China. There are over 100 different fighting systems in Bình Định province, some which are very different to one another. As a general term, any martial arts developed in Bình Định province is just called Võ Bình Định. There are many traditional and non-traditional styles in Binh Dinh province. The term Võ Cổ Truyền translates to traditional Vietnamese martial arts. Traditional Vietnamese martial arts according to Vietnamese martial arts scholar and president of the Federation of Traditional Vietnamese Martial Arts Federation (Liên đoàn Võ thuật Cổ truyền Việt Nam) PhD Phạm Đình Phong was developed thousands of years ago by farmers (Người nông dân) along the Mekong Delta. These people considered themselves Viet and defined themselves as genetically different from the Chinese who considered themselves as Han. The Viet people developed their fighting system and style by mimicking animals in the jungle such as tigers, monkeys, and snakes. According to Phạm Đình Phong's research, traditional Vietnamese martial arts was mainly developed to defend against larger neighboring countries. There are many martial art's systems in Bình Định province that are traditional Vietnamese martial arts and some that are not considered traditional Vietnamese martial arts. One particular style of traditional Vietnamese martial arts in Binh Dinh province that is popular is called Võ Tây Sơn. Võ Tây Sơn's popularity came about during times of feudalism (thời phong kiến). There were three brothers known as the Tây Sơn brothers because they were from a county in the state of Bình Định called Tây Sơn. Their names were Nguyễn Nhạc, Nguyễn Lữ, and Nguyễn Huệ. The three Tây Sơn brothers overthrew the Nguyễn lords and Trịnh lords and united Vietnam into the shape of the letter S as seen today. Today the martial arts that was practiced by the Tây Sơn Brothers is called Võ Tây Sơn. Any system that has techniques and forms used by the Tây Sơn Brothers is called Võ Tây Sơn.

=== An Vinh Village ===
An Vinh Village is located in the county of Tây Sơn and is considered Võ Cổ Truyền Vietnam and also Võ Ta which translates to Our Martial Arts. The founder of the An Vinh Village Style of Võ Bình Định is Nguyễn Ngạc. According to the villagers of An Vinh, Nguyễn Ngạc is a descendant of Bùi Thị Xuân, a talented martial artist and famous general during the Tây Sơn rebellion. Vietnamese people are typically smaller in stature and the An Vinh style assumes that the opponent is not Vietnamese, making them possibly taller and stronger. With a height and strength advantage, An Vinh Style utilizes speed to overwhelm their opponents by combining multiple strikes and combinations in a single attack which can be seen in their empty hand forms.

=== An Thái Village ===
An Thái is a neighboring Village to An Vinh located in An Nhơn County across a river known as the Côn River and is the birthplace of Tây Sơn Martial Arts as the Tây Sơn Brothers first Master Trương Văn Hiến opened his martial arts school in this village around 1765 in order to escape persecution.

Over time the village of An Thái became home to many ethnic Hoa, some from Fujian, Teochew, Hainan, and Guangdong and those practicing Tây Sơn Martial Arts over time moved out of the village. The founder of the An Thái Village Style of võ Bình Định is Diệp Trường Phát. Born in 1896 in An Thái village Bình Định province with his ethnic origins being Chinese as his parents are from Ming Xiang, China. At the age of thirteen Diệp Trường Phát was sent to China to study martial arts which he later brought back to the An Thái Village after many years of intensive training. After returning home to An Thái Village from his training Grand Master Diệp Trường Phát continued to practice and develop his own style of martial arts. Grand Master Diệp Trường Phát's goal was to develop a style from scratch in order to teach those in the An Thái Village as that village did not have their own martial arts. There are many in Bình Định Province who consider An Thái as Võ Tàu or Chinese martial arts however Nguyễn An Pha a board member of the Federation of Vietnamese martial arts explained that since this style was developed in Bình Định Province it is considered as Võ Bình Định Martial Arts and is also Vietnamese Martial Arts and is no longer Chinese Martial Arts. An Thái fighting system focuses on power and strength as every strike utilizes one hit as one kill.

== Schools ==
Famous schools in the Bình Định region include the following: Võ đường Phan Thọ, Võ đường Phi Long Vịnh, Võ Đường Chùa Long Phước, Bình Thái Đạo Võ đường Lý Xuân Hỷ Võ đường Lê Xuân Cảnh and Võ đường Hồ Gia.
