= Dave Lowry (martial arts) =

American writer

Dave Lowry is an American writer best known for his articles, manuals and novels based on Japanese martial arts.

A student of Japanese martial arts since 1968, when he began studying Yagyū Shinkage-ryū kenjutsu under Ryokichi Kotaro of the Nara Prefecture of Japan, he has also studied Shintō Musō-ryū, as well as karate, aikido, and Kodokan judo.

He has a degree in English, and has written about a variety of topics related to budō, the Japanese concept of the "martial way." He has written training manuals on use of weapons such as the bokken and jo, a few novels centered on the lifestyle of the budōka (one who follows the martial way), and many articles on martial practices and traditional Japanese philosophy. He has been a regular columnist for Black Belt magazine since 1986, where he writes on the traditional arts.

He has written almost 20 books, primarily on the martial arts.

He has also held positions as a published restaurant critic.

== Published works ==
- The Connoisseurs Guide to Sushi
- Clouds in the West: Lessons from the Martial Arts of Japan
- Moving Toward Stillness: Lessons in Daily Life from the Martial Ways of Japan
- Traditions: Essays on the Japanese Martial Arts and Ways
- Autumn Lightning: The Education of an American Samurai
- Persimmon Wind: A Martial Artist's Journey in Japan
- Jo: The Art Of The Japanese Short Staff
- Sword and Brush: The Spirit of the Martial Arts
- Bokken - Art of the Japanese Sword
- In the Dojo: A Guide to the Rituals and Etiquette of the Japanese Martial Arts
- The Karate Way: Discovering the Spirit of Practice
- The Essence of Budo: A Practitioner's Guide to Understanding the Japanese Martial Ways
- Chinese cooking for diamond thieves (novel)
