= Vietnamese martial arts =

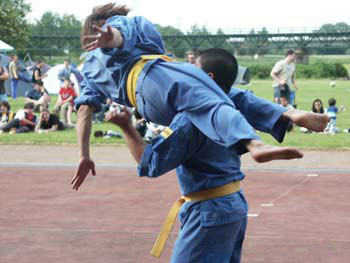
Flying scissors to the neck. The opponent is forced to the ground with a twist of the body.

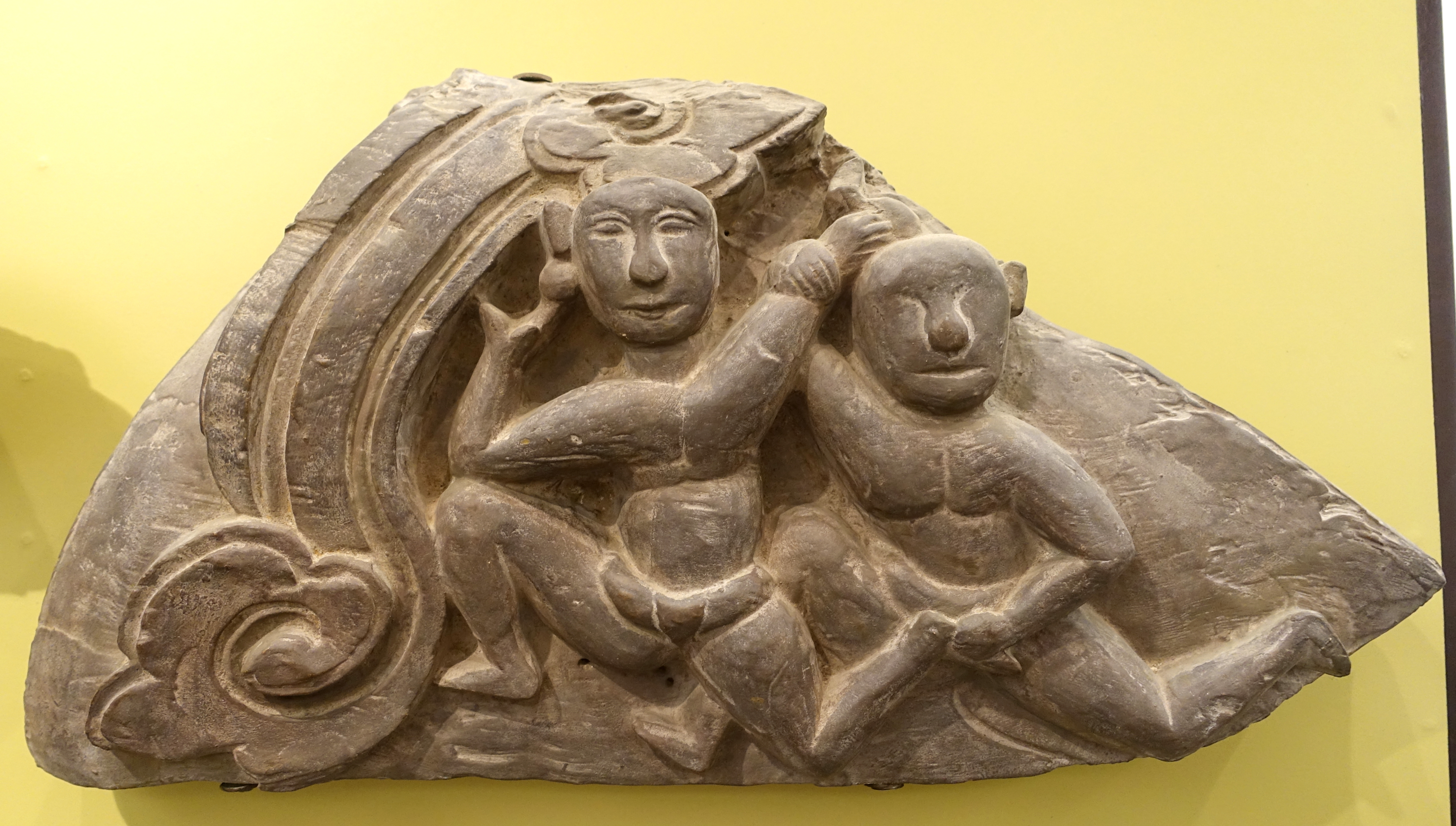
Vietnamese martial art artifact from the 17th century at Vietnam National Museum of Fine Arts - Hanoi, Vietnam.

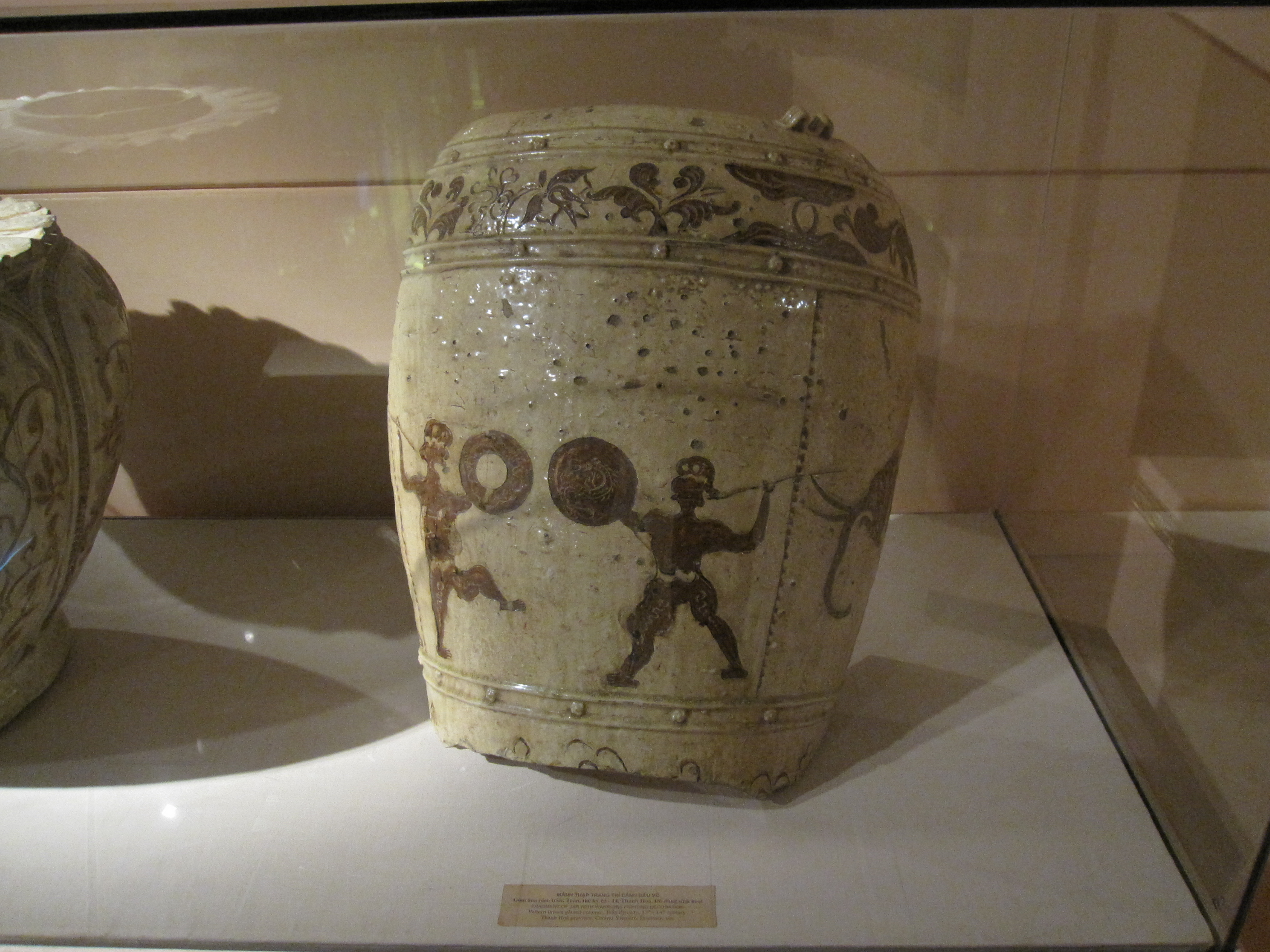
Fragment of jar with warriors fighting, 13th-14th century. National Museum of Vietnamese History, Hanoi.

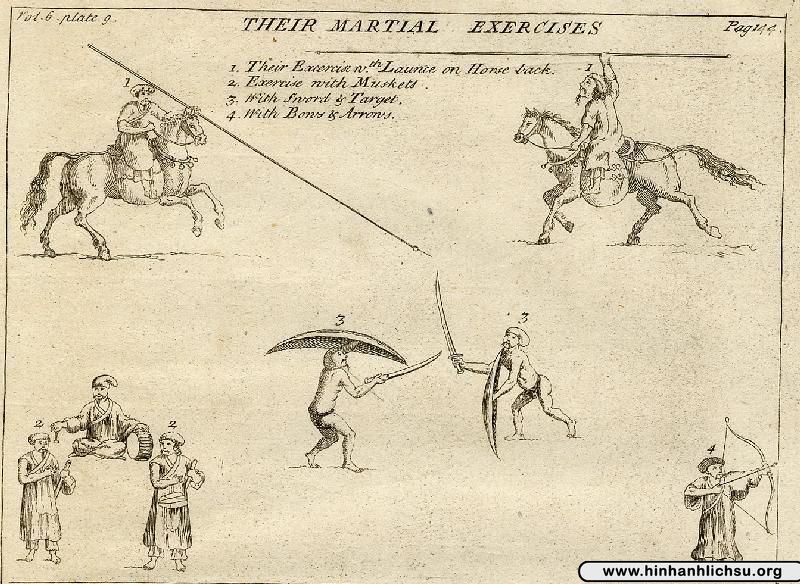
Painting depicting soldiers practicing during the Revival Lê dynasty, 1684-1685

Traditional Vietnamese martial arts (Võ thuật Cổ truyền Việt Nam; Chữ Hán: 武術古傳越南) often referred to as Võ thuật (Chữ Hán: 武術), can be loosely divided into those of the Sino-Vietnamese descended from the Han and those of the Chams or indigenous Vietnamese.

== Traditional schools ==
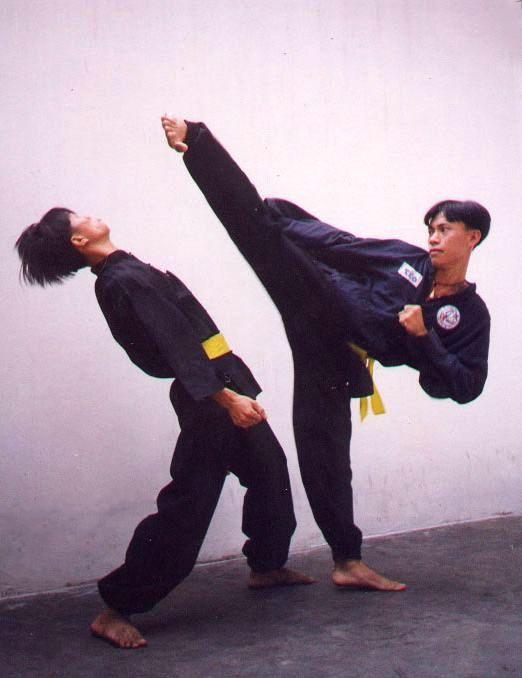
Võ Tân Khánh Bà Trà

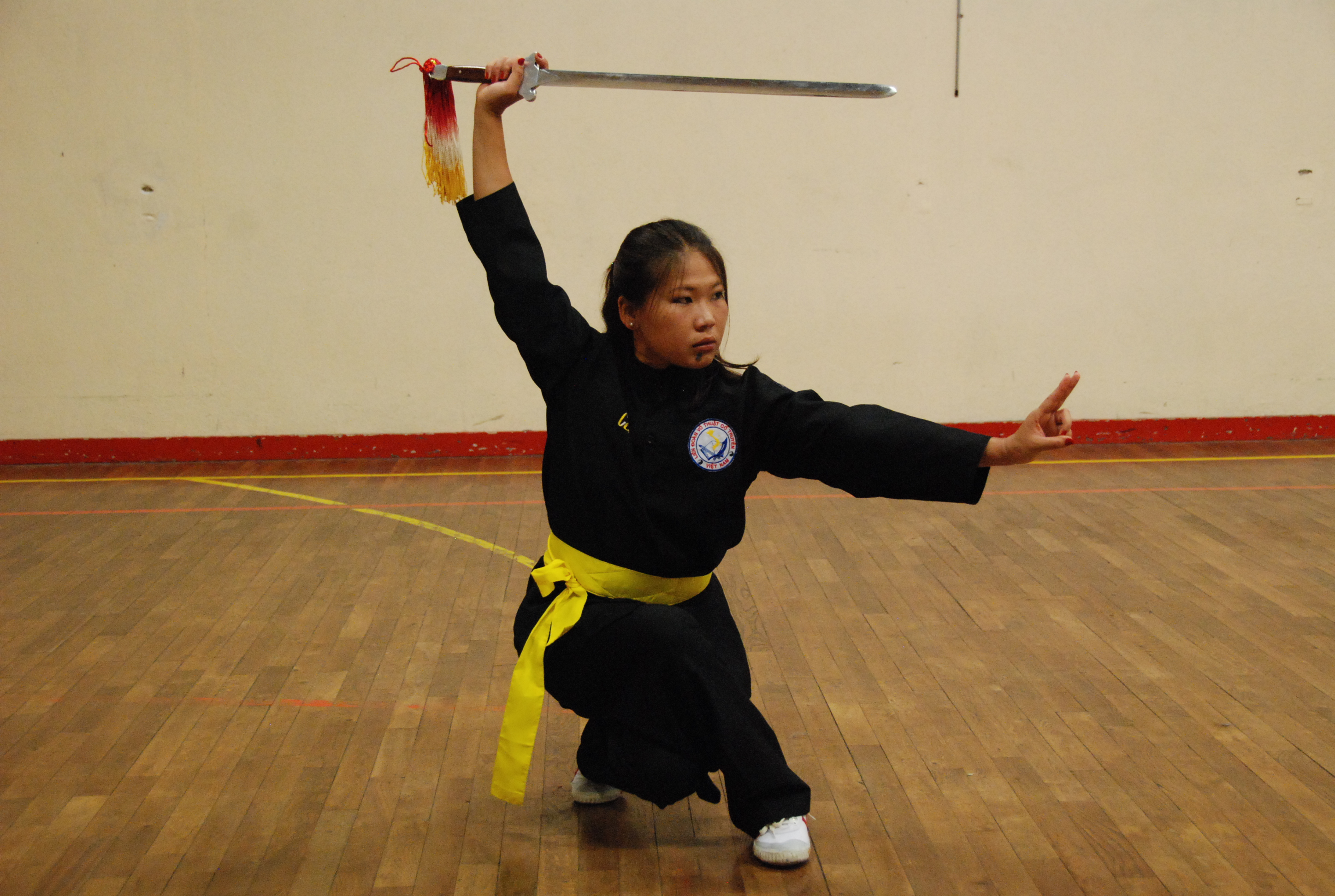
Võ Cổ truyền

- Võ thuật Bình Định/Bình Định Gia – umbrella title for all the traditional styles of Bình Định in central Vietnam.
- Võ Lâm Tân Khánh Bà Trà - The Tân Khánh martial arts was established in the 17th century. It was developed as a method of self-defense against opponents and wild animals.
- Traditional Vietnamese wrestling.

== Modern schools ==
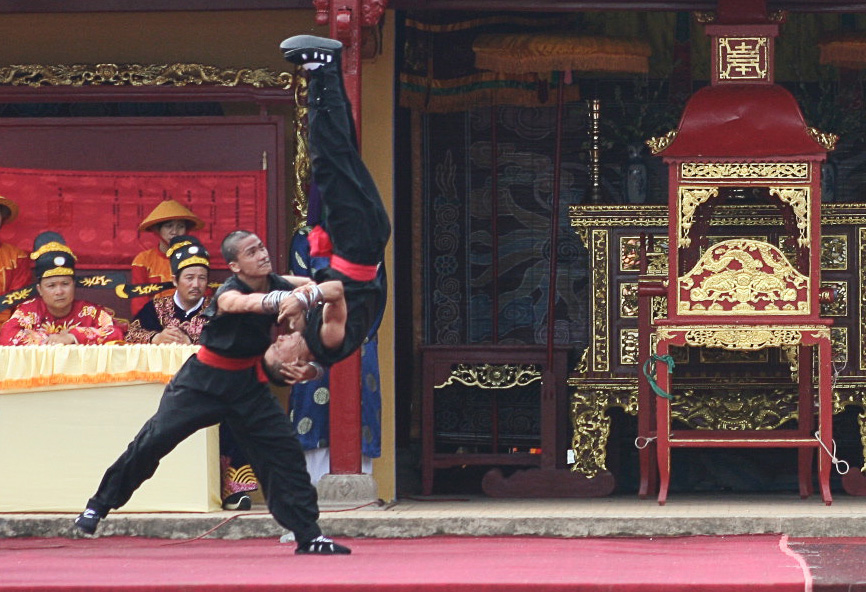
Võ thuật performance at Huế Festival 2008

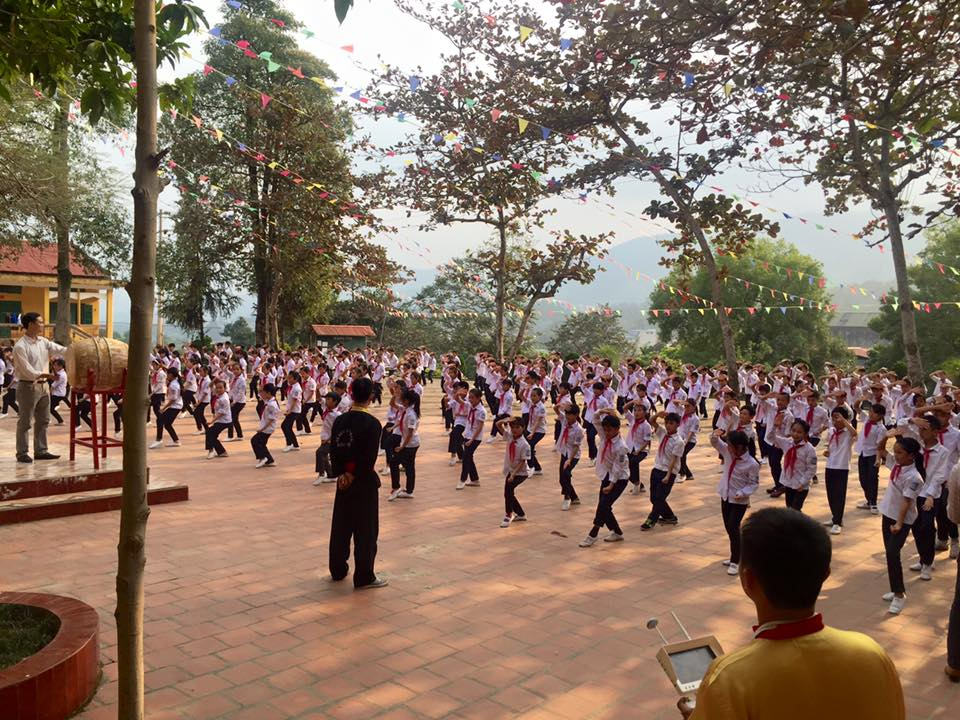
The students of an elementary school learn martial arts while at school

Modern styles, or Phái (schools), include:

- Nhất Nam
- Vovinam – Founded by Nguyễn Lộc. Also called Vovinam Việt Võ Đạo (Việt = Vietnamese, Võ = martial, Đạo = way)
- Võ Việt Nam (Cuton) or Võ Đạo of Phạm Văn Tan.
- Vietnamese Wing Chun - a style of Wing Chun founded by Yuen Chai-wan.

Overseas

- Cuong Nhu of Ngô Đồng (d. Florida 2000), known also by the Japanese title O Sensei.
- Qwan Ki Do, founded in France.
- Tam Qui Khi-Kong, now popular in Russia.
- Vo Dao Vietnam, founded in Germany
- Traditional Vietnamese wrestling.

== Terminology ==
- võ sư – master
- võ phục – tunic
- võ kinh – martial arts scripture
- Võ Bắc Việt – Northern Vietnam style
- quyền – fist, such as Hùng kê quyền, Hồng Gia quyền, Lão mai quyền
- Võ thuật Bình Định – martial arts of Bình Định
- Đấu vật – ring wrestling (can also mean western wrestling)
- Hand techniques (đòn tay)
- Elbow techniques (chỏ)
- Kicking techniques (đá)
- Knee techniques (gối)
- Forms (Quyền, Song Luyện, Đa Luyện)
- Attack techniques (chiến lược)
- Traditional wrestling (Vật cổ truyền)
- Leg Attack take-downs (đòn chân tấn công)
- Staff (côn)
- Sword (kiếm)
- Halberd (dao dài, "long knife")
- Rope dart/chain whip (nhuyễn tiên, different from Chinese rope dart)
- Khăn rằn - The khăn rằn is a southern scarf that originated from the Khmer krama scarf. The khan ran can be used to lock the enemy's arm, lock the enemy's wrist, lock the enemy's leg, pull the enemy's leg and to attack the enemy's face.

== Gallery ==
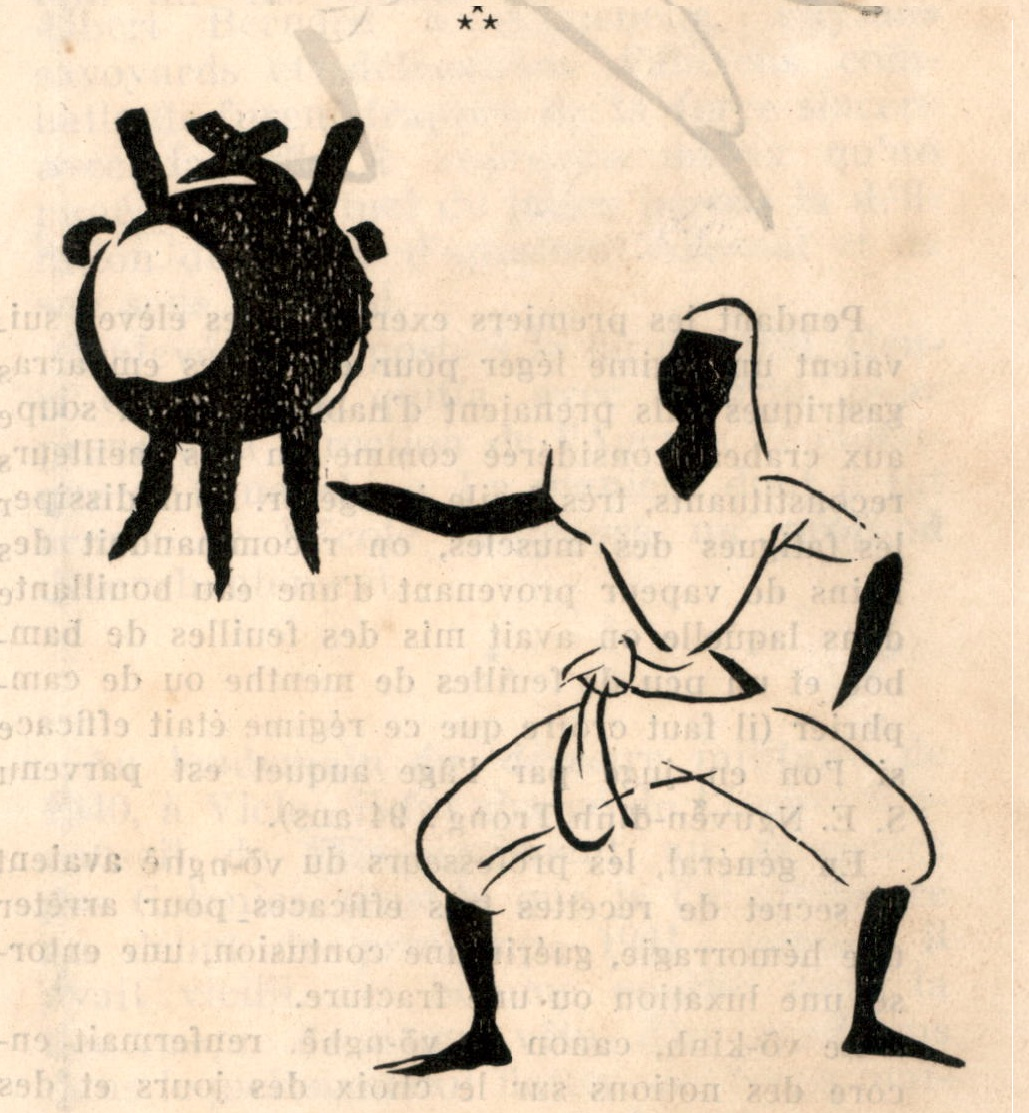
An illustration of a martial arts competition in the Nguyễn dynasty – Part 1

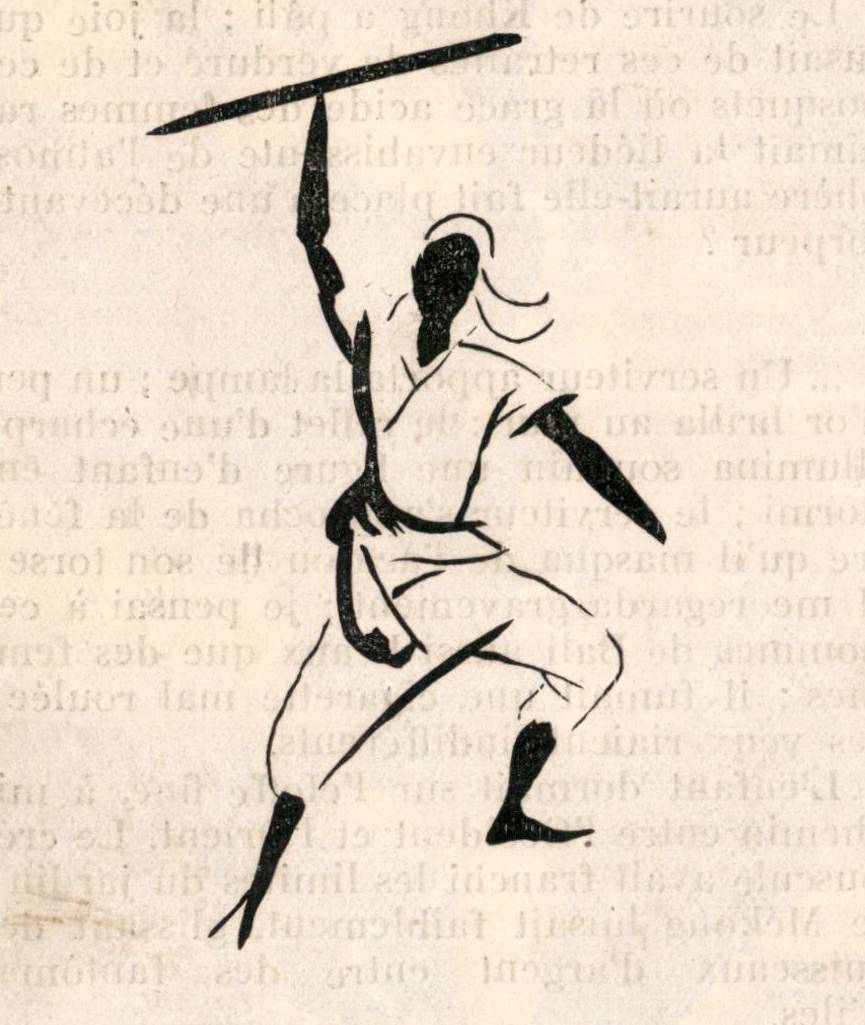
An illustration of a martial arts competition in the Nguyễn dynasty - Part 2.1

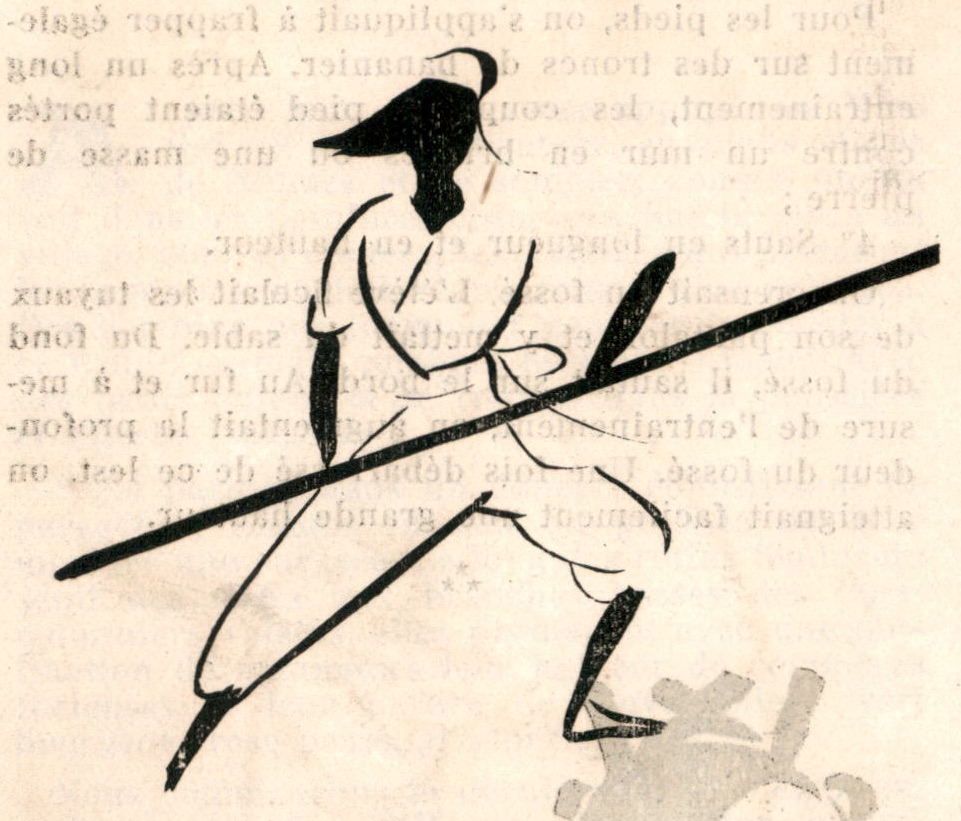
An illustration of a martial arts competition in the Nguyễn dynasty – Part 2.2

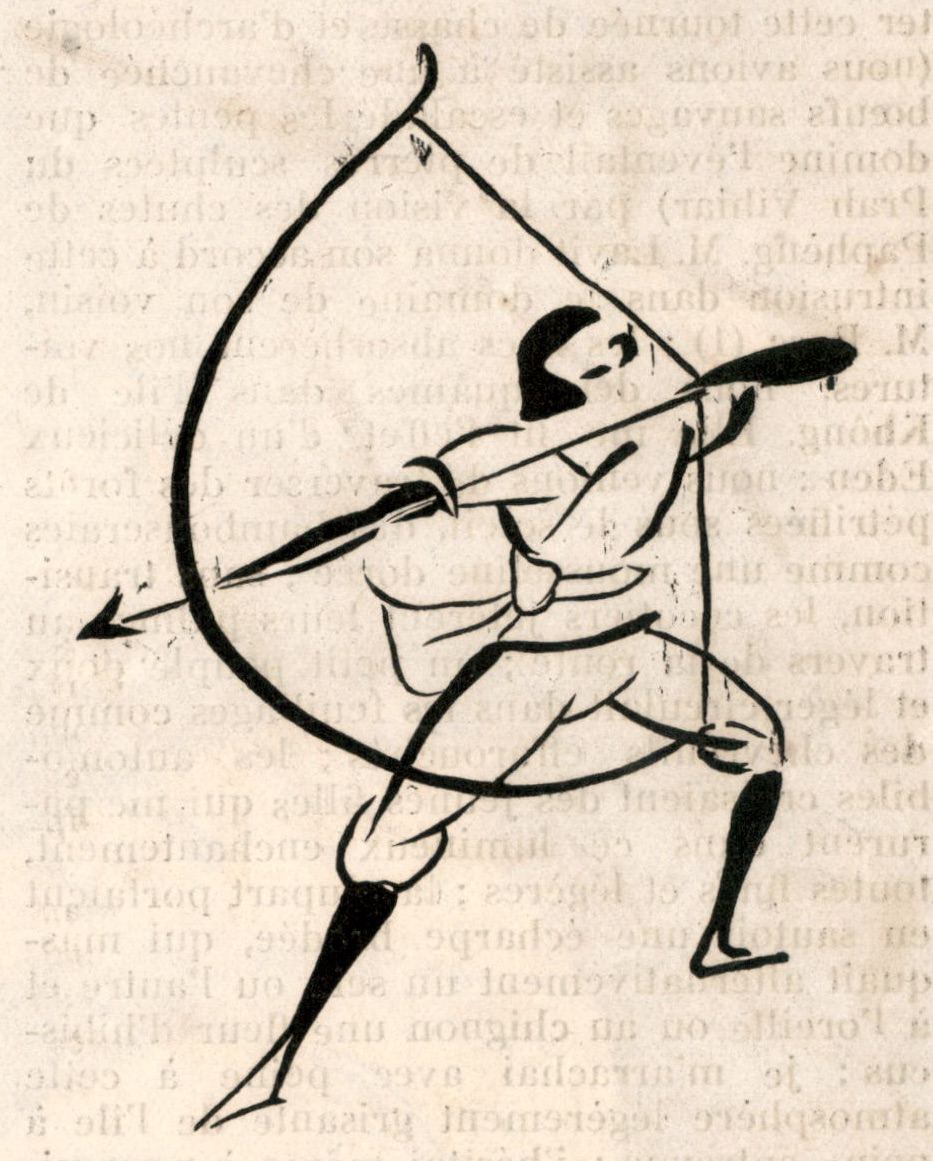
An illustration of a martial arts competition in the Nguyễn dynasty – Part 3

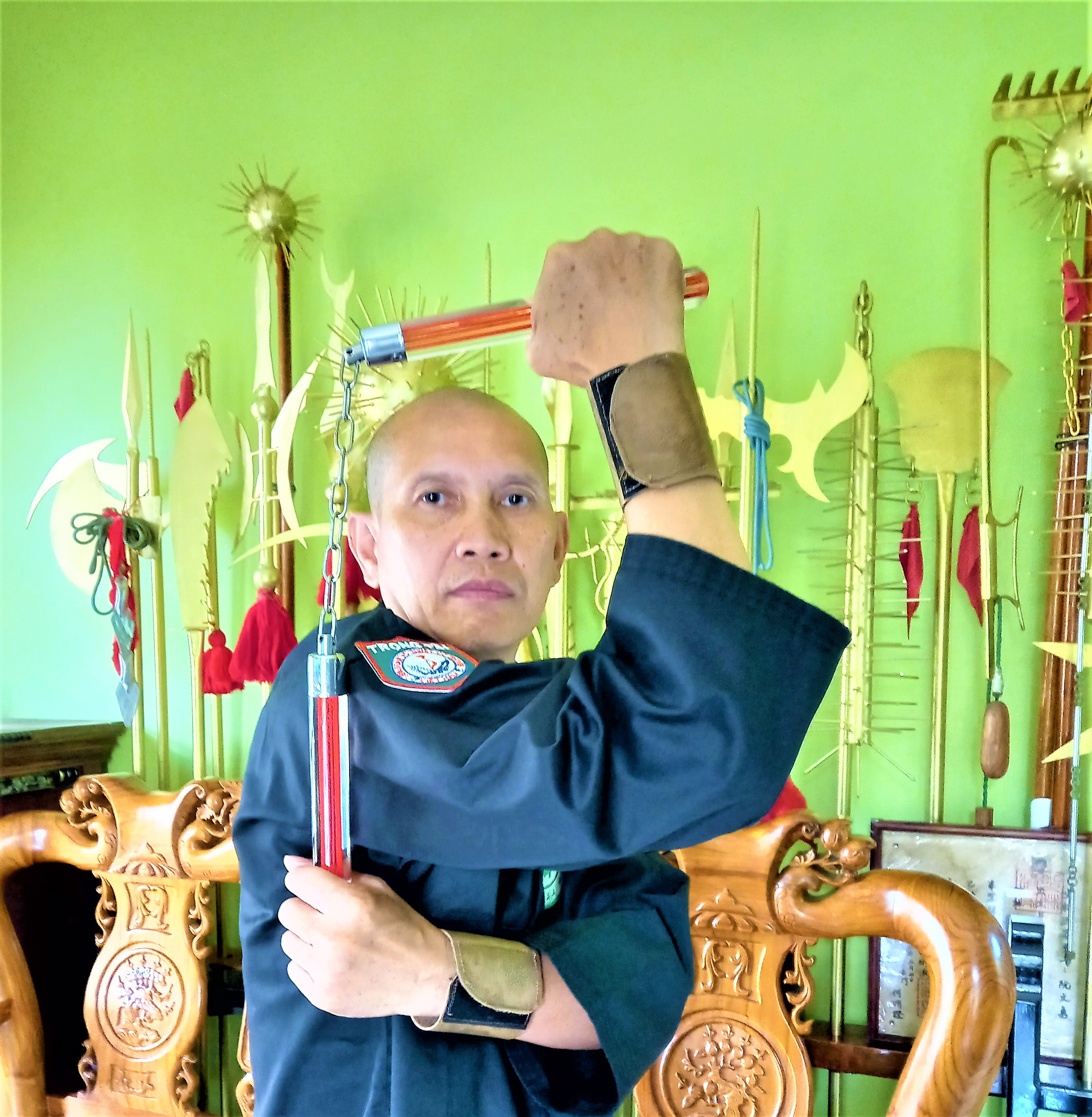
Master Hà Dũng performs nunchaku

== See also ==
- Indochinese martial arts
- Vocotruyen
- World Federation of Vietnam Vocotruyen
- Vocotruyen World Championships
- Vovinam World Championships
