= Dubok (camouflage) =

Three colored camouflage pattern made for the Soviet military

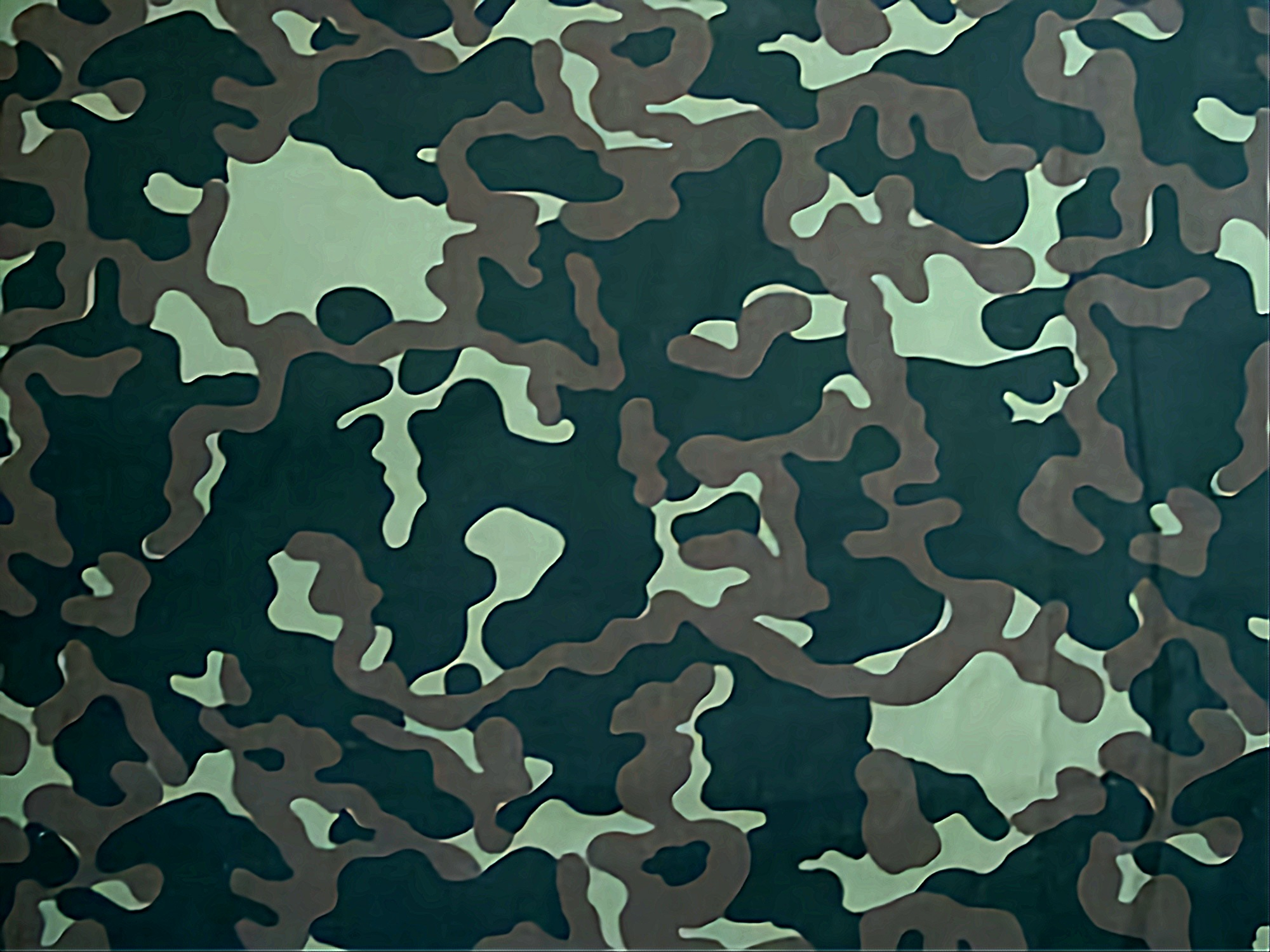
- Ukrainian Dubok pattern.
- Type: Military camouflage pattern
- Place of origin: Ukraine

Service history
- In service: 1997–present
- Used by: See Users
- Wars: Russo-Ukrainian War; War in Donbas

Production history
- Designed: 1997
- Produced: 1997–2014
- Variants: See Variants

"Dubok" is a tricolor military camouflage designed for the Ukrainian Armed Forces in 1997. It was used by the Armed Forces of Ukraine until 2014.

The camouflage is sometimes known unofficially as TTsKO (Russian: Tryokhtsvetnaya kamuflirovannaya odezdha, lit. 'Three Color Camouflage') or as VSR-84.

== History ==
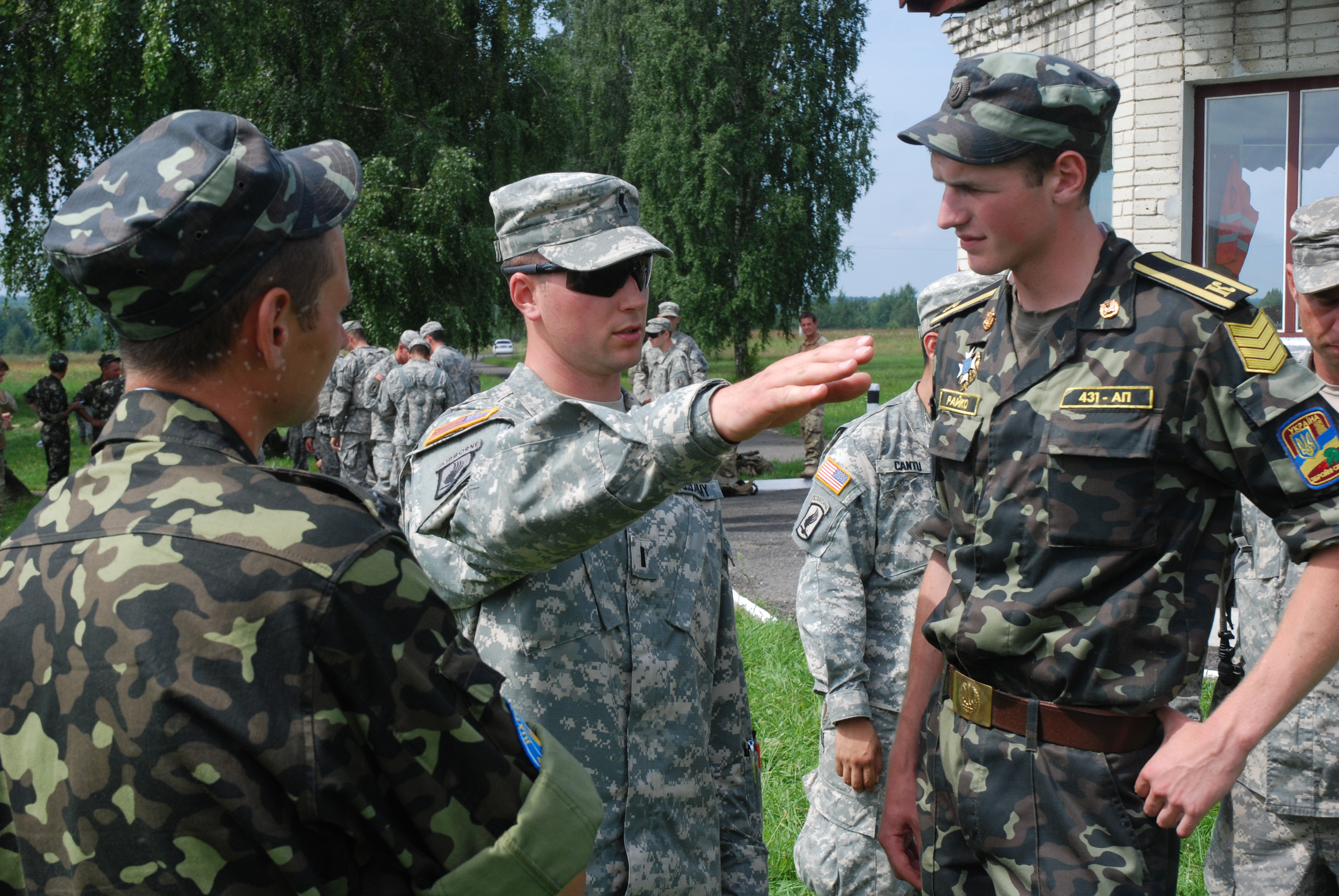
Ukrainian Airborne Forces wearing dubok uniforms with US Army personnel at the Rapid Trident 2011 military exercise

Dubok was developed in 1997 for the Ukrainian Armed Forces. It was designed as a replacement for Soviet-Era "Butan" camouflage uniform's in Ukrainian service. Contrary to popular belief, Dubok is not a variant of Russian, Ukrainian, or Soviet Butan, although it shares similarities with each, it is an entirely different pattern.

In 2014, Dubok was replaced by the MM-14 pattern camouflage. At the time, it was reported that Ukraine obtained Dubok fabric from Belarusian and Chinese producers.

== Design ==
The color scheme "oak", known as "amoeba", has a light green background, on which spots of green and brown colors are applied. The camouflage is designed to blur the silhouette at long and close distances.

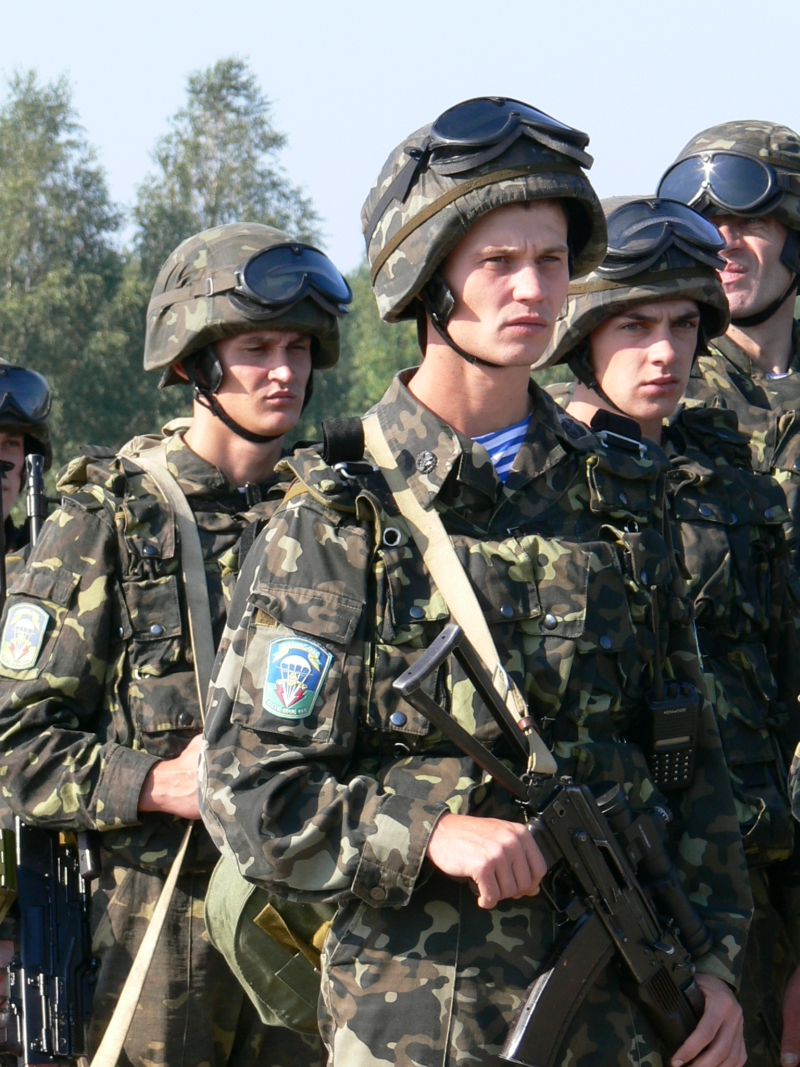
Ukrainian paratroopers of the 79th Airmobile Brigade in "oak" camouflage. 2008, training "Cossack Steppe"

== Variants ==
=== Belarus ===
Belarus formerly used a clone of the Ukrainian Dubok desert variant.

=== Ukraine ===
A desert variant was developed based on the Ukrainian version of the Dubok. It is either known in the Ukrainian military as the Dubok-P (Desert) or Dubok-UA (Desert-UA).

== Users ==
=== Current ===
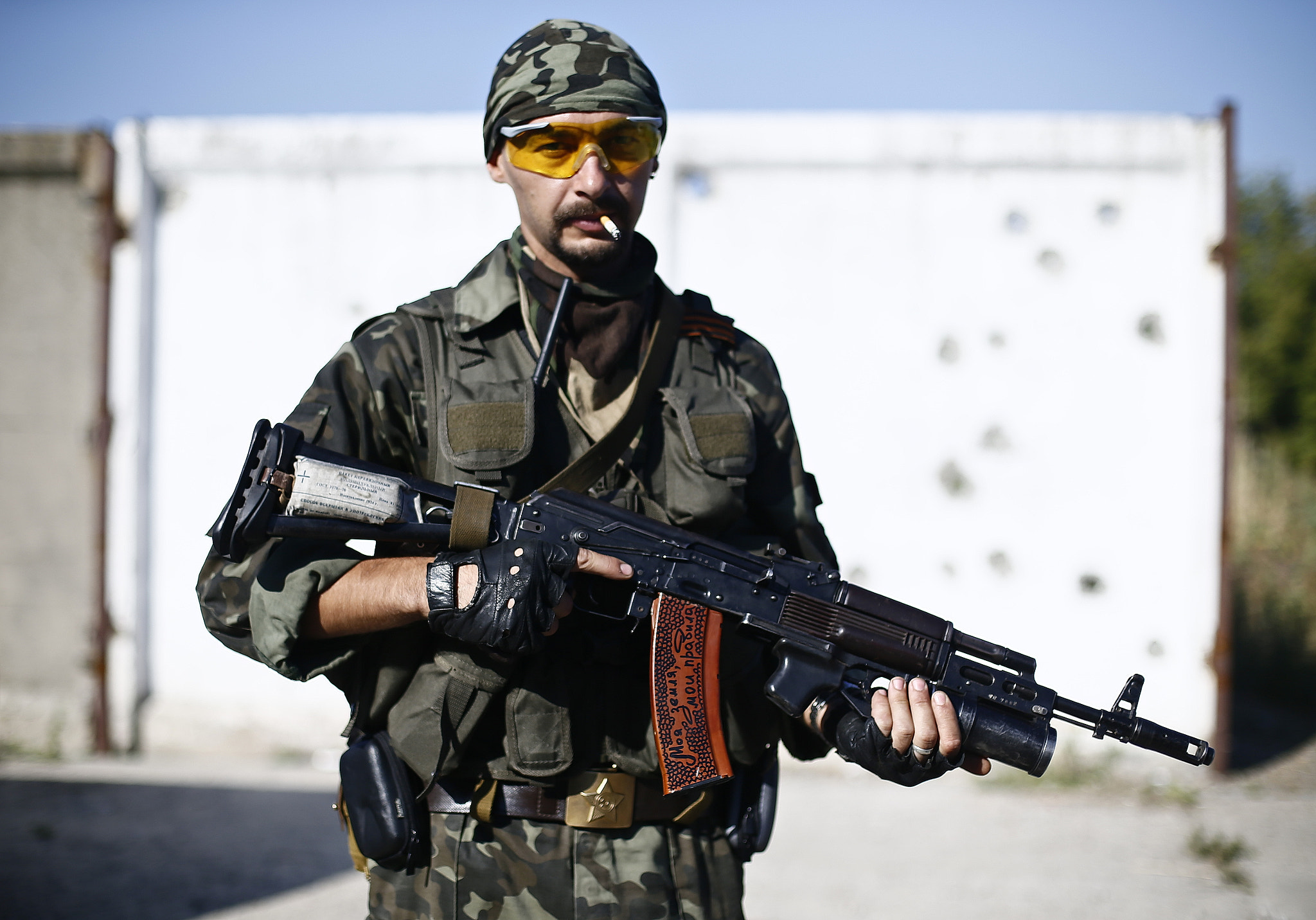
A pro-Russian separatist fighter wearing a Dubok uniform

==== Non-state actors ====
- Russian Orthodox Army

=== Former ===
- Azerbaijan: Both original Dubok and domestic variants worn by Azerbaijani Armed Forces during First Nagorno-Karabakh War.
- Belarus: Known to be used by Belarusian airborne and special forces units. Ukrainian desert variant used in 2003 and 2004 with Belarusian soldiers in peacekeeping missions in desert scenarios.
- Serbian Krajina: Kninjas paramilitary forces used one piece coverall uniforms made from M82-based TTsKo.
- Ukraine: Used by the Armed Forces of Ukraine until 2014. Replaced from service by the MM-14.
- Donetsk People's Republic
- Luhansk People's Republic
