= Dobok =

Uniform worn for Korean martial arts

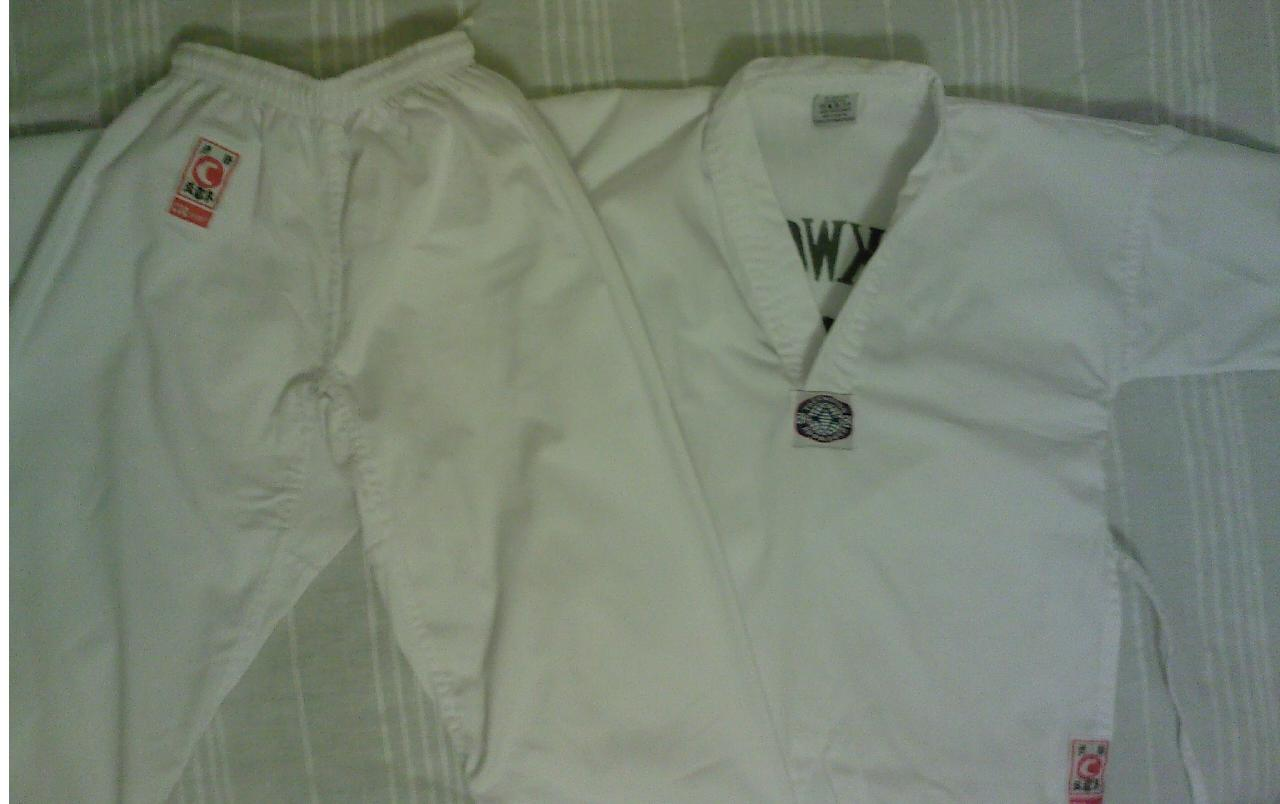

Korean name
- Hangul: 도복
- Hanja: 道服
- RR: dobok
- MR: tobok

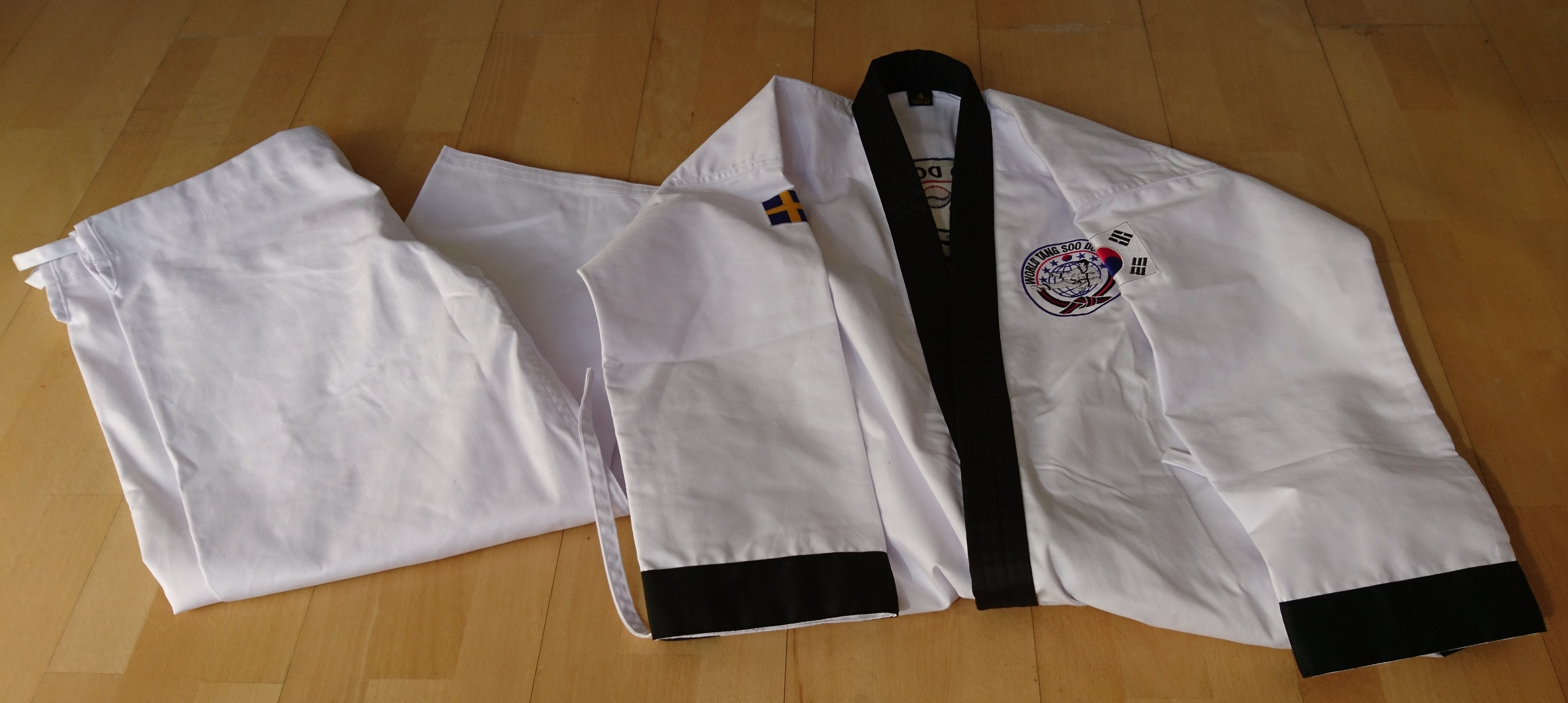
Black Belt Tang Soo Do Dobok

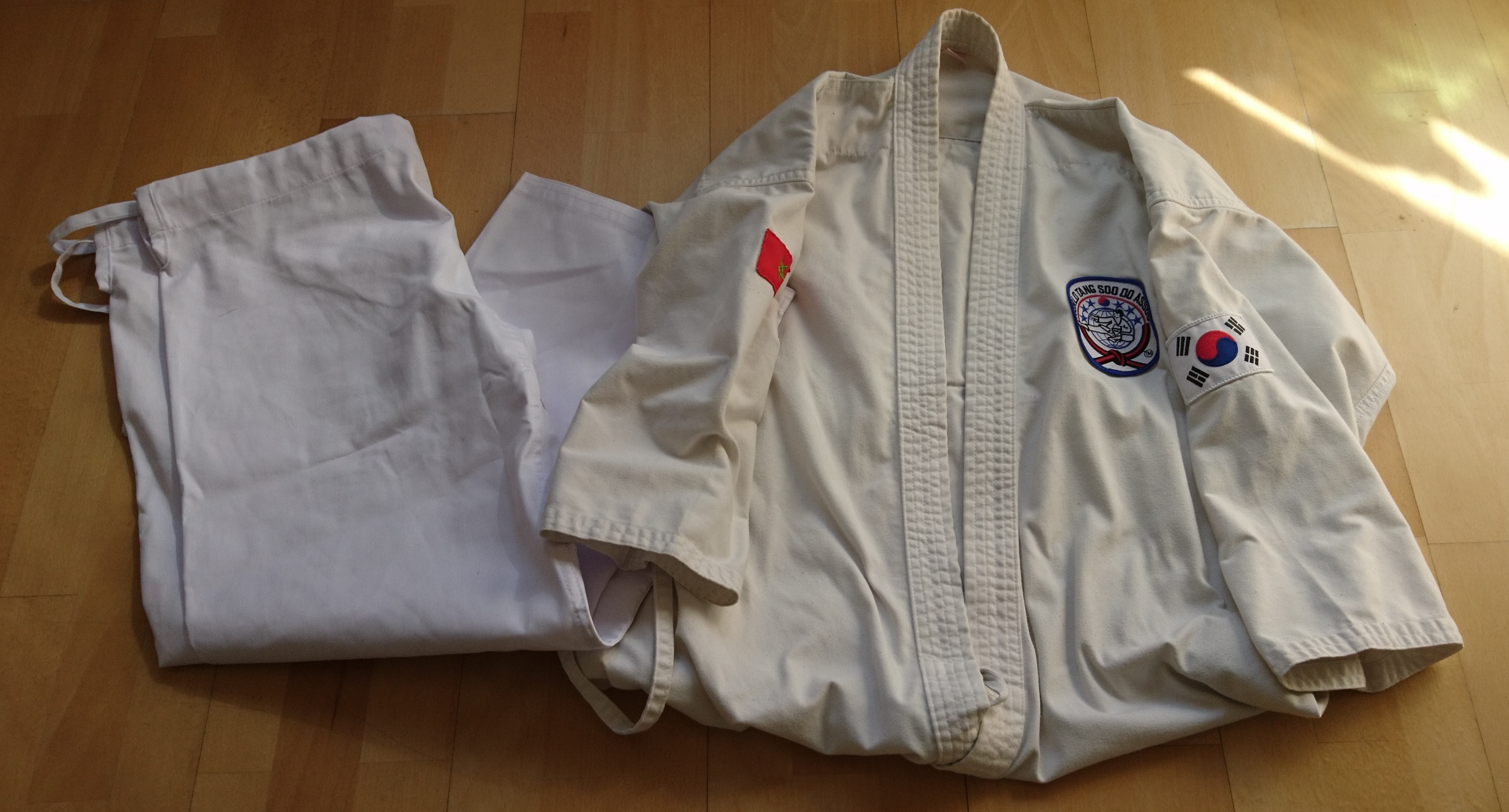
Gup Tang Soo Do Dobok

Dobok (Korean: 도복) is the uniform worn by practitioners of Korean martial arts, such as taekwondo. Do means "way" and bok means "clothing". The dobok came from the Japanese keikogi/dōgi, used in Japanese martial arts, such as judo.

The dobok comes in many colors, though white and black are the most common. The dobok may have the reverse in a different colour than the rest of the dobok. They are made in a variety of materials, ranging from traditional cotton to cotton-polyester blends.

The pants and sleeves of the dobok are wider and longer than the traditional Japanese keikogi. Due to this, practitioners often wear a dobok modeled after the Korean hanbok. The dobok of World Taekwondo Federation-style taekwondo practitioners usually have v-neck jackets, tailored after the design of the hanbok. Traditional taekwondo practitioners may wear dobok that are identical or very similar to keikogi, with a cross-over jacket front, while International Taekwon-Do Federation-style taekwondo practitioners typically wear a newer design with a vertically closing jacket front.

Around the dobok a tti (belt) is worn. The color of the belt denotes the rank or grade of the wearer. Coloured belts are for geup-holders, while black belts are usually worn by dahn-holders. The order of belt colors may differ from school to school. Most commonly the first belt is a white belt. Other colours are typically yellow, orange, green, blue, purple, red, brown, and then black. Some schools use other colours, such as brown in place of red and red in place of black. Some also have a stripe running down the length of the centre of the tti.

Practitioners of Korean sword arts like keomdo usually wear wider pants, called chima baji (치마바지; lit. skirt-pants) that are similar looking to the Japanese hakama for kendo or iaijutsu.
