= Combat uniform =

Military uniform

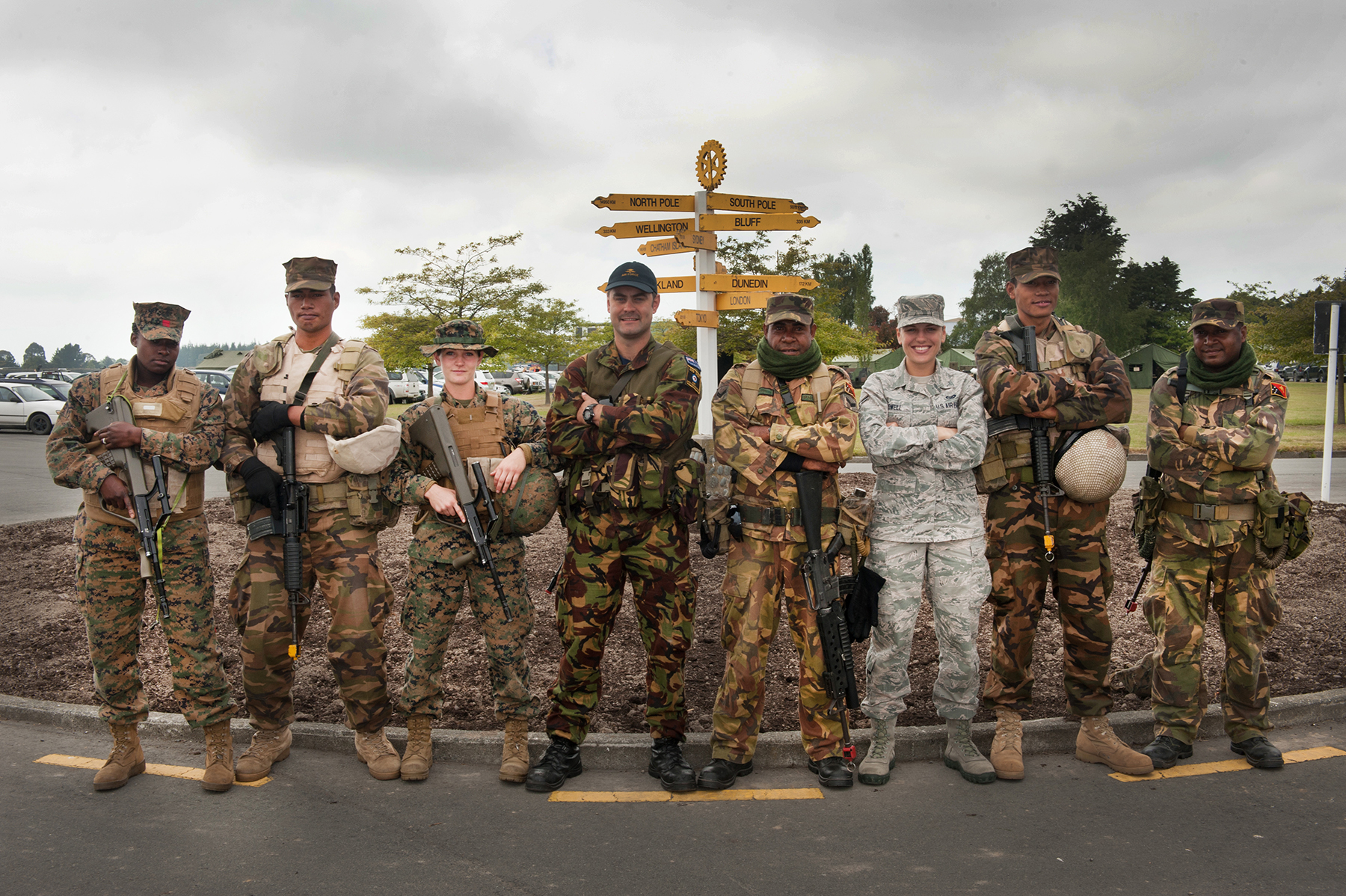
Military service members of different nationalities wearing a variety of combat uniforms in 2013.

A combat uniform, also called a field uniform, battledress, or military fatigues, is a casual uniform used by military, police, fire, and other public uniformed services for everyday fieldwork and duty, as opposed to dress uniforms for formal functions and parades. It generally consists of a jacket, trousers, and shirt or T-shirt, all cut to be looser and more comfortable than more formal uniforms. Combat uniform designs vary by regiment or service branch (e.g. army, navy, air force, marines, etc.). Uniform fabrics often come in camouflage, disruptive patterns, or otherwise olive drab, brown, or khaki monochrome, to approximate the background and make the soldier less conspicuous in the field. In Western dress codes, field uniforms are considered equivalent to civilian casual wear, less formal than service dress uniforms, which are generally for office or staff use, as well as mess dress uniforms and full dress uniforms.

Combat uniforms have existed to some degree in most organized militaries throughout history, with the intent of providing both protection and easy identification. The British Indian Army's Corps of Guides were the first to use drab combat uniforms starting in 1848, when they wore light-brown clothing called "khaki" by Indian troops. The Second Boer War and World War I ended the pre-modern practice of issuing brightly-colored combat uniforms in favor of green, brown, khaki, and grey uniforms that better suited the varied environments of modern warfare. The first proper military camouflage pattern was Italy's telo mimetico, originally designed for half-shelters in 1929. Germany's Wehrmacht began issuing camouflage uniforms to paratroopers during World War II, and by the end of the war, both the Allies and Axis made use of camouflage uniforms for select units, usually special forces. The Cold War and post–Cold War era saw the gradual shift from monochromatic olive and khaki combat uniforms to those using camouflage patterns.

== Terminology ==
In British English, battledress is often the preferred name. In American English, the term fatigues has often been used by the Army, or utilities by the Marines, originally being a term for work uniforms. In the late- and post-Cold War era, the term battle dress uniform (BDU; from the American uniform of the same name) is used most often to describe combat uniforms in general.

== Combat uniforms by country ==
=== Australia ===
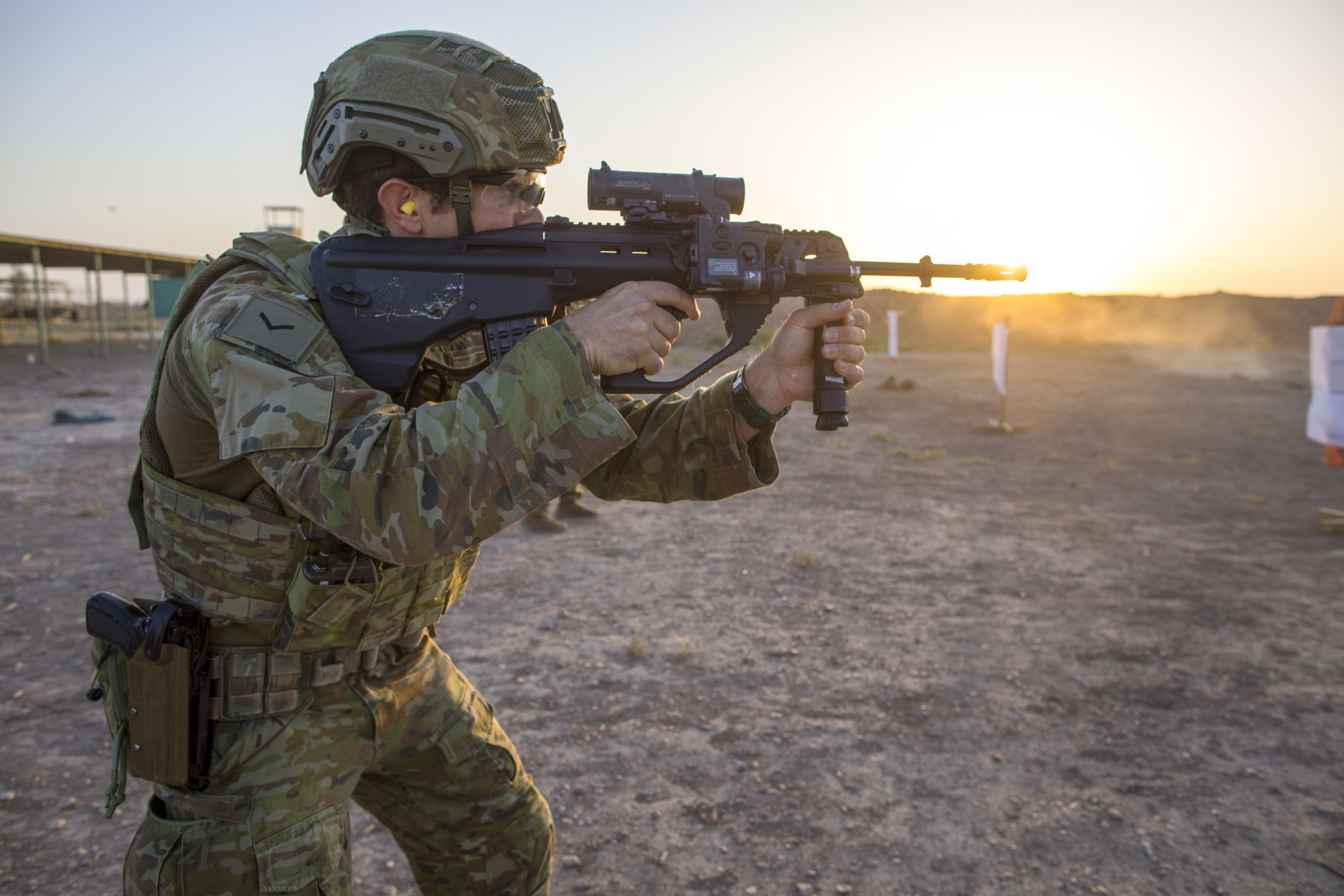
An Australian soldier wearing the Australian Multicam Camouflage Uniform

Australia generally followed British-style uniforms, but did not join other Commonwealth countries in adopting the British Battledress during World War II; instead, Australia continued to use a slightly updated version of the uniform worn during World War I, which continued into the Korean War. Following service with the 28th Commonwealth Division in Malaya and Borneo, Australia adopted "Jungle Greens" (JGs) for all field wear, eventually modifying the uniform during the Vietnam War with slanted pockets and with the blouse to be worn outside of the trousers, similar to U.S. "jungle fatigues" (the forerunner of the U.S. Battle Dress Uniform) which also first appeared in Vietnam. The modified JGs were colloquially called the "Pixie suit." JGs were worn through the 1970s and until the adoption of Australia's own camouflage pattern called Disruptive Pattern Combat Uniform (more commonly called DPCU or Auscam) introduced from 1982. There were also multiple patterns based on DPCU, including the Disruptive Pattern Desert Uniform, and a red/white version for OPFOR teams during combat exercises

The Australian Defence Force has, as of 2014, introduced the Australian Multicam Camouflage Uniform (AMCU) for Army and Air Force personnel engaged in warlike activities, and for Air Force field exercises. There is two main variants of AMCU available to AA and RAAF troops, the Field Uniform, the standard uniform cut seen since LAND125 Phase 4. It features 2 breast pockets, an epaulette on the chest, a pocket on either upper sleeve (where a unit patch and flag are attached with hook and loop fasteners), two front trouser pockets, 2 side zip pockets and a pocket to slip in kneepads. The AMCU Field variant is worn by the army as barracks dress. The second variation is the AMCU Combat Uniform. It features a knitted section around the torso for breathability under body armour, and 2 slanted sleeve pockets along with reduced amounts of pockets on the trousers to increase dexterity and breathability.

=== Canada ===
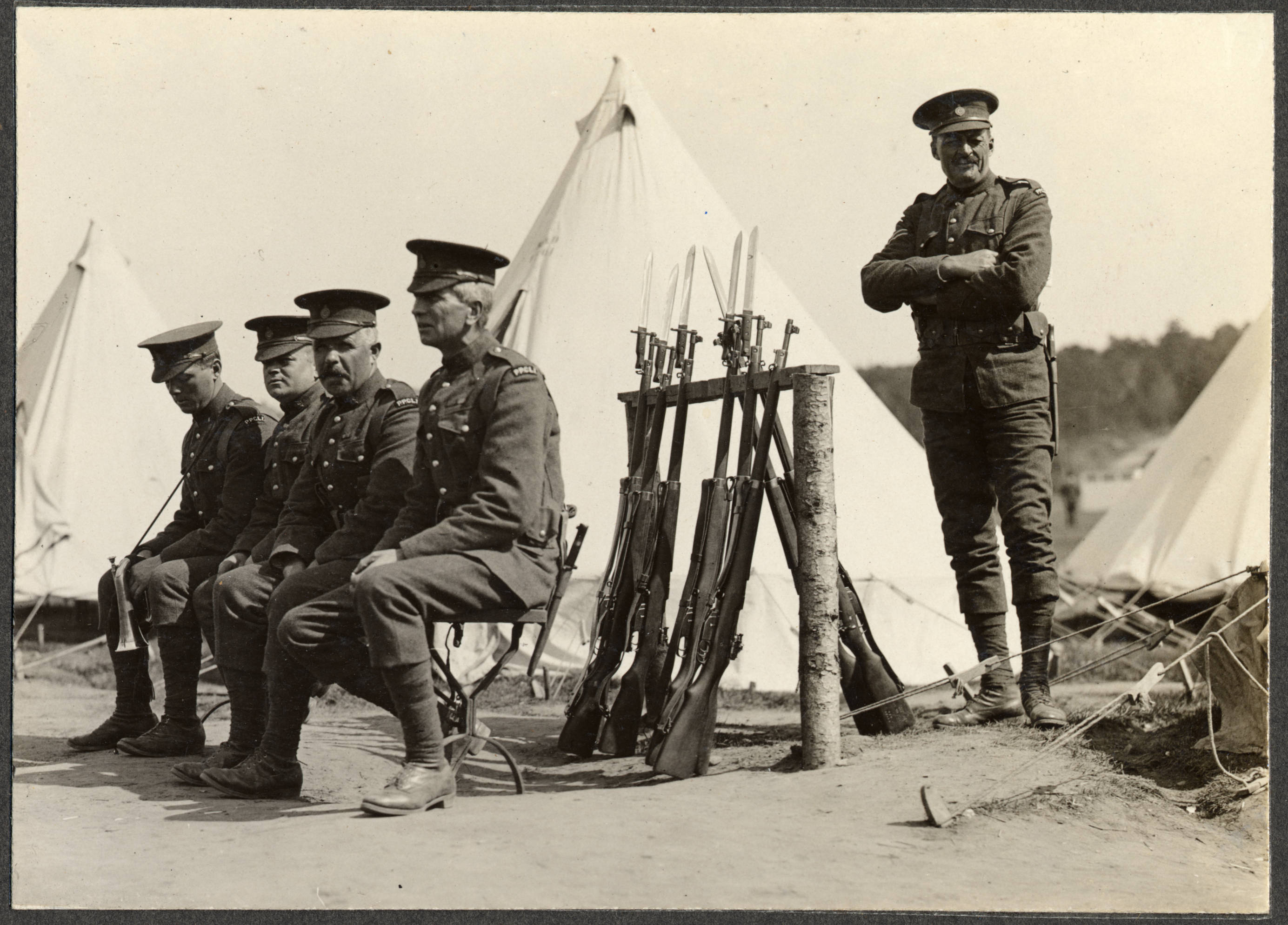
Canadian soldiers in service dress during the First World War

The first true battledress adopted by Canada for standard issue across the board was the khaki field uniform known as Service Dress, adopted in 1907. This was of a separate pattern from the British Service Dress adopted after the Boer War, and marked a departure in Canadian uniforms in that it was distinct from the scarlet/blue/rifle green uniforms traditionally worn to that point, the latter of which became "ceremonial" dress for parades and other functions apart from field training.

Until well into the Cold War era, the Canadian Army had worn battle dress uniforms similar to their British and Commonwealth counterparts, though with different national identifiers and regimental accoutrements (with Khaki Drill uniforms being worn in the summer or in tropical regions). In the early 1950s, battle dress began to be replaced with lightweight uniforms, at first Bush Dress for summer wear, and in the 1960s with a new combat dress, a set of olive drab garments more similar to the American style of combat wear (i.e. made up of layers and solely for wear in the field as opposed to all-purpose wool Battle Dress).

==== Service Dress (1907–1940) ====
Canadian pattern Service Dress worn by other ranks did not stand up to the rigors of campaigning, however, and was widely replaced by British uniforms in France; some samples of Canadian pattern SD were retained in Canada, and after the war, surviving to be issued briefly in 1939.

Officers wore a distinctive pattern of Service Dress (as did Warrant Officers I Class), which was identical to that worn by British officers; they were privately purchased, and of better quality than other ranks uniform. In combat in France and Flanders, they were often replaced on an individual basis by other ranks' Service Dress, making the officer less conspicuous to enemy snipers and soldiers.

==== Khaki Drill (1900–1949) ====
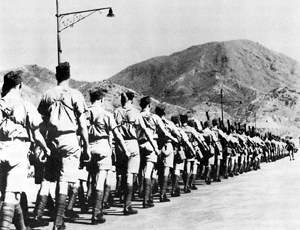
A Canadian contingent in Hong Kong wearing Khaki Drill uniform

Khaki Drill was a series of different uniform patterns of light khaki cloth, generally cotton, first worn by Canadian soldiers in the Boer War and reserved for summer training in Canada, or for employment in tropical climates. Canada developed its own pattern after the First World War, and the uniform was commonly worn in Canada, with officers again having the option of finer garments privately purchased. In the Second World War, Canadians serving in Jamaica and Hong Kong wore Canadian pattern KD; the I Canadian Corps troops in Italy wore KD supplied in theatre by the British, generally of British, Indian or US (War Aid) manufacture.

Worn in tropics far beyond 1949. KD was still in issue and worn with either short or long trousers as parade dress. Jacket was replaced with shirt for normal barrack dress wear. Worn by all British units in Kenya until Dec 1964. Also in issue and worn by British Honduras Garrison and attached Infantry Company Group until at least 1968.

==== Battle Dress (1939–1970) ====
In 1939, the Battle Dress uniform was adopted as a field uniform; made of wool and patterned after British BD, Canadian uniforms were darker in color with a distinctive green tinge to the dark khaki color. Officers had the option of having BD tailored from better material, but in the field most wore "off the rack" BD, perhaps with a modified open collar.

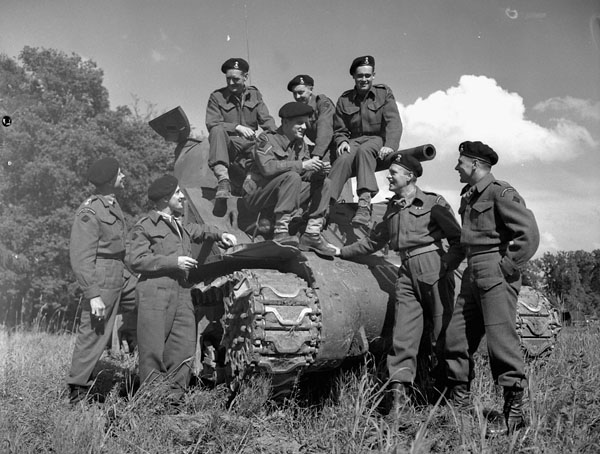
Members of the Sherbrooke Fusiliers Regiment in battle dress uniform, June 1945

Battle Dress was worn in 1939 and into 1940 by soldiers in Canada as field dress, and afterward was no longer issued except to a select few. While a new pattern of Service Dress was introduced for Other Ranks in this period, it was reserved for dress wear only. Battle Dress completely replaced SD as a field uniform beginning in 1940 as enough of the new uniforms became available.

A new pattern of BD was introduced in 1949, with an open collar matching that of British Pattern 1949 BD. The garment was worn as a field dress throughout the Korean War, and into the 1960s until replaced by the Combat uniform. Some Militia units used BD as a dress uniform until the early 1970s.

The US Army produced its own version of the BD blouse for issue to soldiers in Europe. Although most of these were produced in England, they were of a dark green color, rather than khaki. Called the ETO (European Theater of Operations) jacket, American soldiers dubbed it the Ike Jacket, after General Dwight D. Eisenhower.

==== Bush Dress (1950–1960) ====
Bush Dress was a series of dark green cotton uniforms, similar to KD clothing, which replaced those uniforms just prior to the Korean War. Like KD, Bush Dress was worn primarily as a field uniform. It was replaced by the Combat uniform in the 1960s.

==== Combats (1960–2000) ====
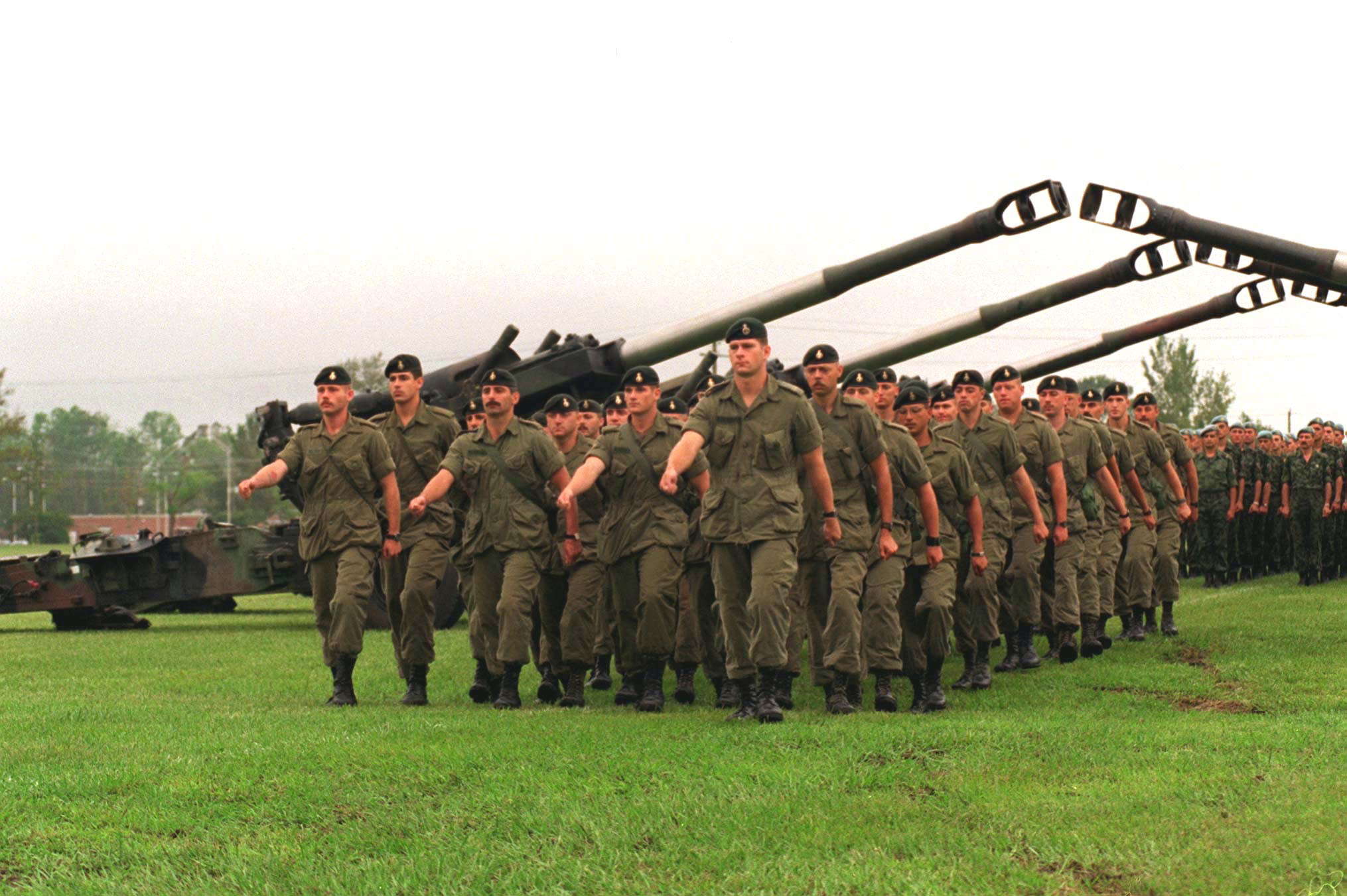
Canadian soldiers marching in their green-coloured combat uniforms, 1996

The green combat uniform became universal battledress in the 1960s, and was designed to be worn in any environment (though a tan coloured "tropical" version was worn during Operation Desert Storm and by the Airborne in Somalia).

The Canadian pattern combat uniform had angled pockets, designed to take magazines from the FN C1A1 battle rifle; a truly poor design of infantry load bearing equipment inspired this design – the 1964 Pattern Web Equipment had no ammunition pouches. The angled pockets are repeated on the new CADPAT uniform, though they are enlarged and not intended for ammunition carriage.

The Canadian combat uniform had a high nylon content, which had the potential for producing significant burns.

==== CADPAT (2000–present) ====
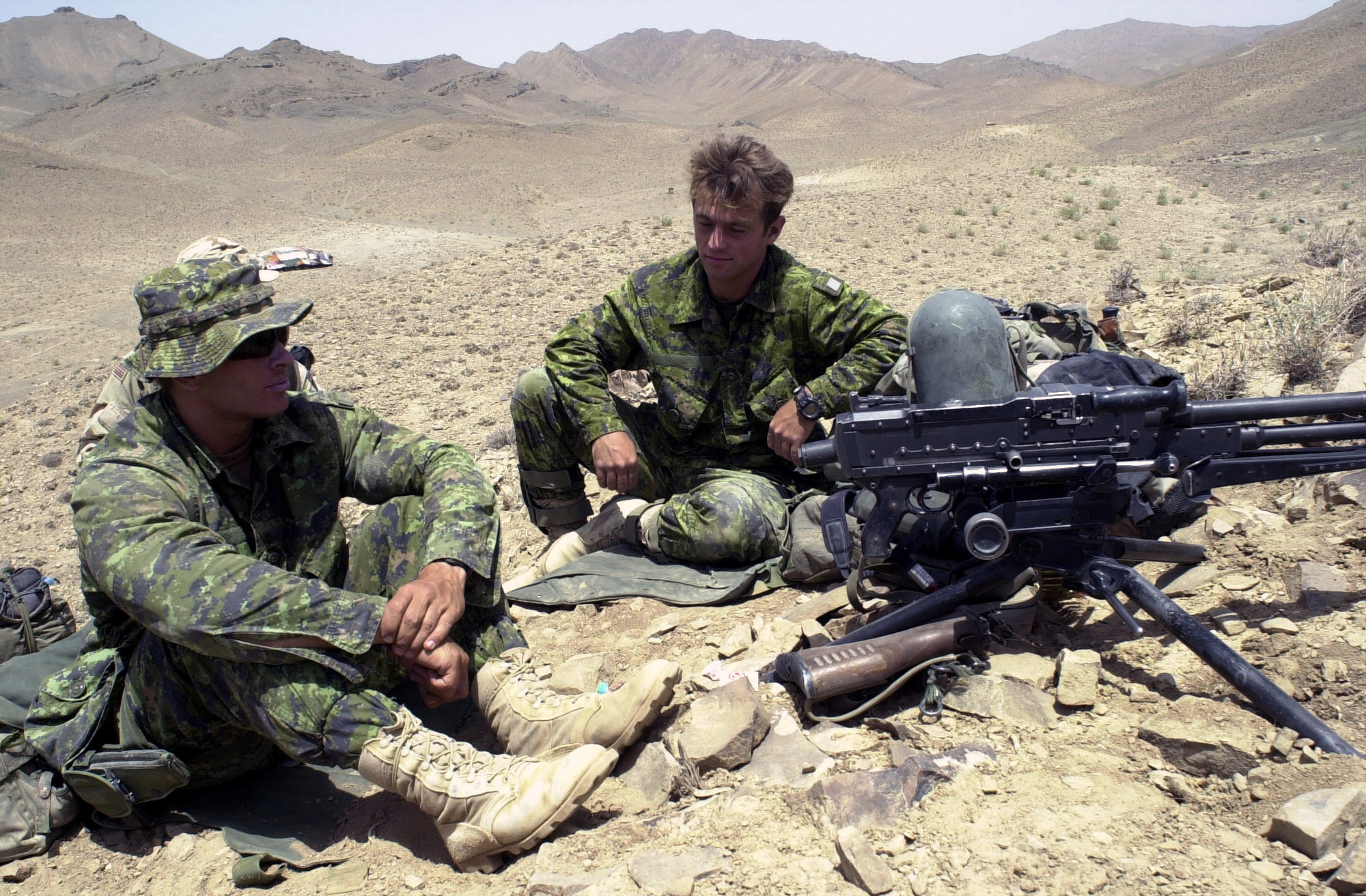
Canadian personnel wearing CADPAT TW operational dress

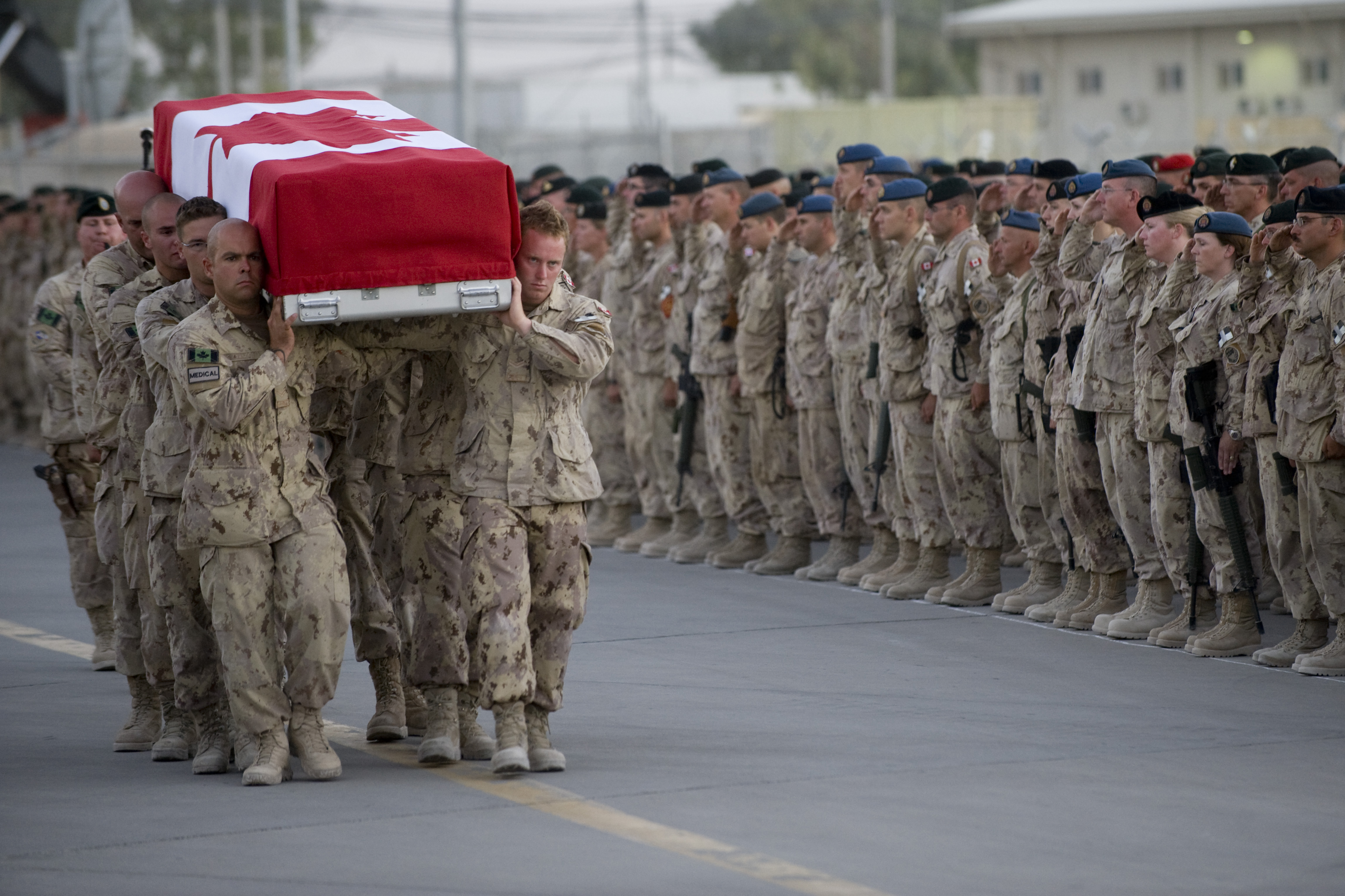
Canadian personnel in CADPAT AR operational dress

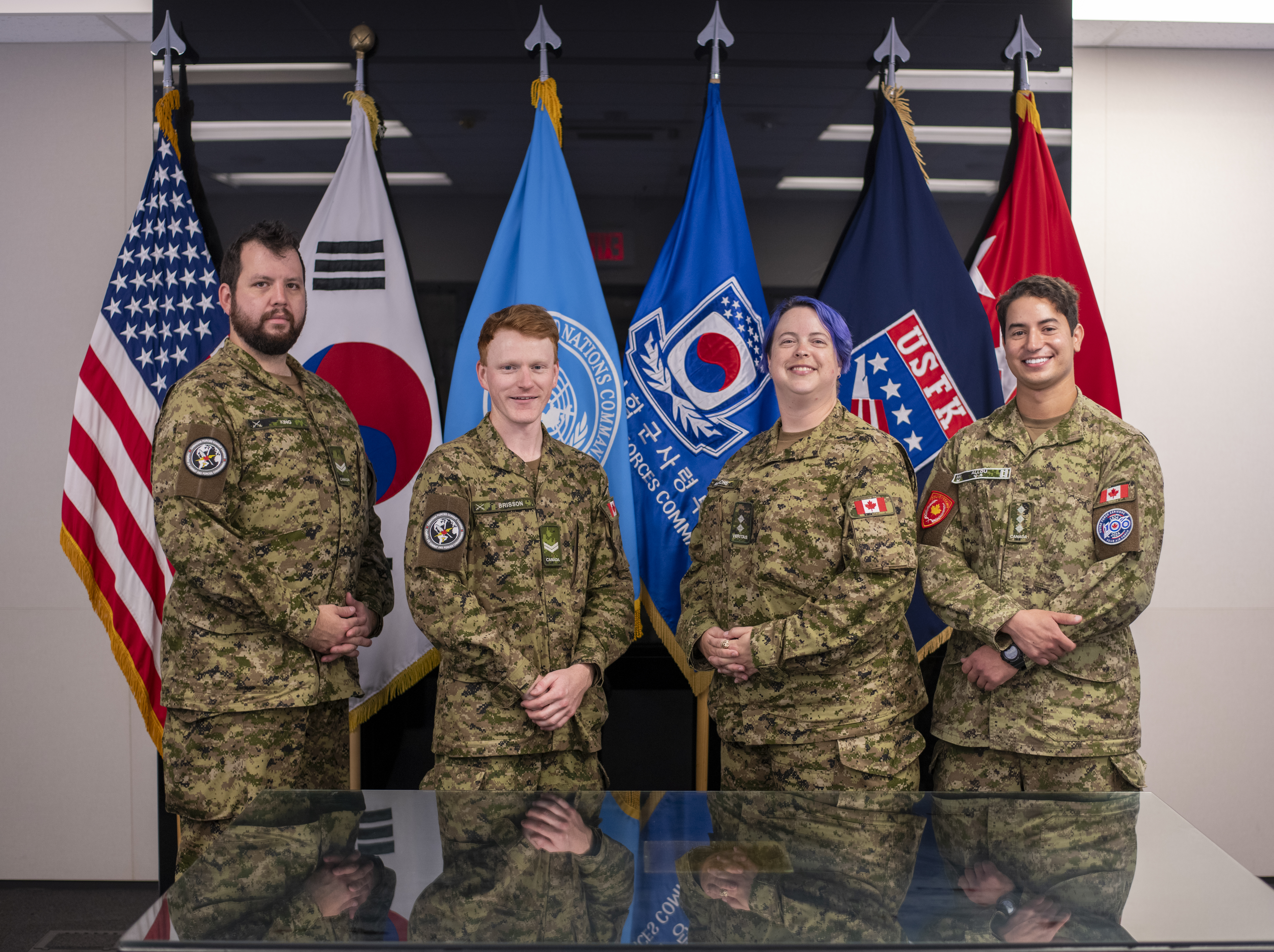
Canadian personnel wearing CADPAT MT operational dress

Operational uniforms used by the Canadian Armed Forces incorporates a digital camouflage design known as CADPAT

In Canada, battledress is referred to officially as "No. 5 Operational Dress", and in general parlance as "combat uniform" or "combats". The new Canadian Disruptive Pattern uniform is commonly called "CADPAT" to differentiate it from the previous uniform called "combat". The term combat now refers to the old monochrome (single color) combat uniform.

The Canadian Forces used the four-colour CADPAT design, a computer-generated pixelated pattern issued in TW (temperate woodland) and AR (arid region) colours. Camouflage cloth of CADPAT pattern was created and adopted in 1995, used for issue helmet covers in 1997 and trousers and blouses in CADPAT began to replace the olive green combat uniform from 2001 when Canadian forces joined the UN peacekeepers in Bosnia-Hercegovina. The AR version was introduced when Canadian troops were deployed to Afghanistan. Previously, a tan version of the olive combats had been used for tropical wear by soldiers deployed to the Middle East, particularly during Operation Desert Storm and were to be worn by the Canadian Airborne Regiment (Cdn Ab Regt) for the (subsequently canceled) deployment the Western Sahara in 1991. They were later worn by the Cdn Ab Regt during their deployment to Somalia. The TAN colored combat uniform was also issued to Canadian troops serving in the Western Sahara with the UN Mission (MINURSO) during 1992–1993.

From 2024, the Canadian Forces is rolling out/employing the five-color Multi-Terrain CADPAT design, a computer-generated pixelated pattern that would serve to blend into a wide range of environments. Because of the advancements in surveillance and sensors, the soldier is more vulnerable to detection to the enemy. Therefore, the Canadian Forces sought to replace the previously used four-color TW and AR colors. They can still be found in-use, but is expected to be transitioned out of use by 2026.

==== Specialised clothing ====
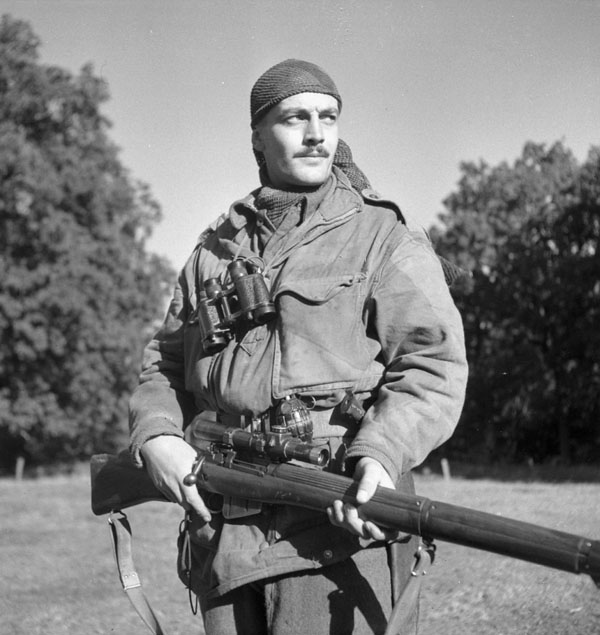
Canadian sniper Harold Marshall in a Denison smock

Specialised battledress was developed primarily during the Second World War, including the Denison smock – originally for parachutists but also adopted by snipers. Specialized jump clothing was perpetuated by the Canadian Airborne Regiment who wore distinctive disruptive-pattern jump smocks from 1975 until disbandment in 1995.

The Canadian Army has made extensive use of plain coveralls as a field uniform, commonly using khaki coveralls in the Second World War to save wear and tear on wool BD. In the 1950s and 1960s, the Canadian military adopted black coveralls which were often worn as combat dress, replacing them in the 1970s with rifle green coveralls. These were worn in the field in Canada by units in training but are also evident in photos of men deployed to West Germany during the Cold War, as armoured and mechanized units sometimes preferred to wear coveralls when carrying out maintenance.

Special patterns of AFV uniform were also worn beginning in the Second World War, initially black coveralls, later khaki coveralls as well as the padded "Pixie suit". Olive drab tanker's uniforms were adopted with the combat uniform in the 1960s, including a distinctive padded jacket with angled front zip.

=== France ===
From the mid-19th century to the end of the Second World War, France's field uniforms for dismounted troops were based on a kind of universal long coat called the capote and breeches, both made of woollen serge. For line infantry this greatcoat was worn buttoned back from the legs when on the march. Until the end of 1914 the capote was produced in dark blue cloth and the breeches were red (pantalon rouge). These highly visible uniforms were replaced in early 1915 by light blue/grey (bleu horizon) uniforms for metropolitan troops and khaki for colonial troops.

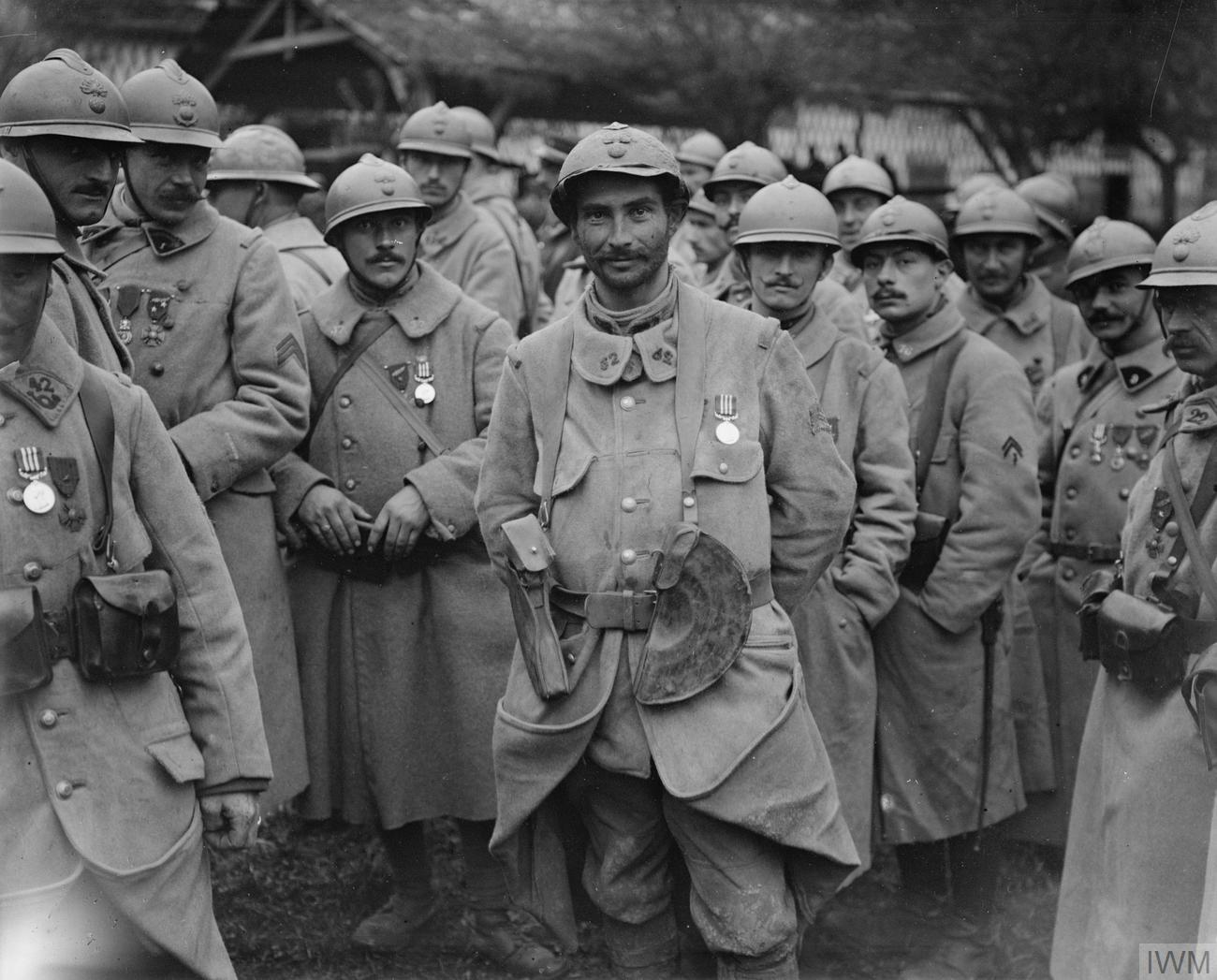
French soldiers during the Battle of the Somme, 1916

In 1921, the French army decided to replace the bleu horizon with khaki. Because of large surplus stocks built up during the war, this measure was not fully effective until 1937. However, during the Phoney War of 1939-40 some third-line troops were still equipped with bleu horizon uniforms.

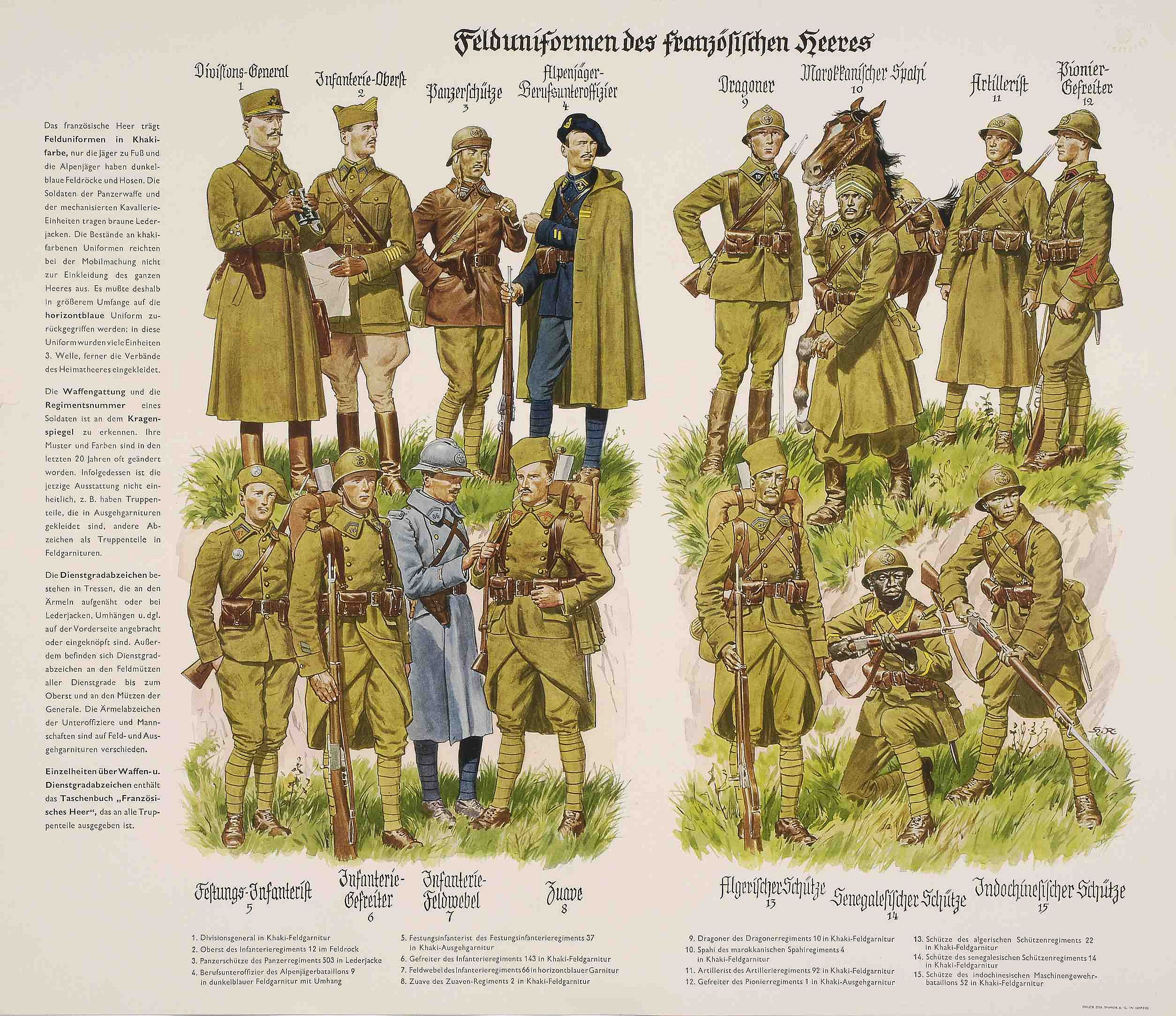
A 1939 OKH illustration for German Army use showing the different field uniforms employed by the French Army at the time, including some of those used by colonial troops

After the defeat, the French army went on wearing 1940 uniforms, in particular in the armée d'Afrique (Army of Africa). Some new equipment was introduced by Vichy for the "armistice army" limited to 100,000 soldiers on French soil. The old French uniforms were progressively replaced in the Free French forces by much more modern British or American uniforms, which were progressively withdrawn but still in use until the end of the fifties.

==== Cold War era ====
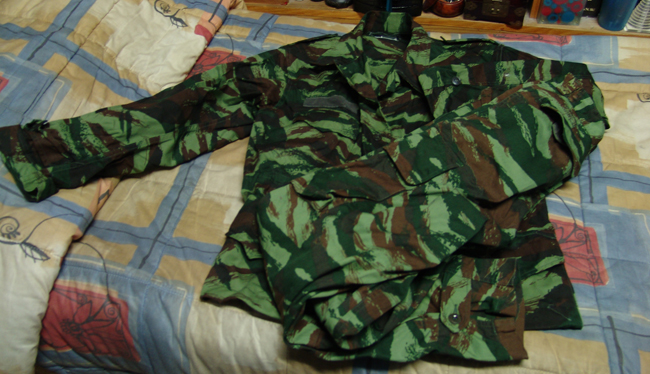
Field jacket and trousers for the lizard pattern battle dress uniform. The camouflage pattern was introduced in 1947 and used to until the 1980s

The first French battledress was introduced in 1945 and was made of a heavy cotton duck, sometimes taken from old German stocks and based on the same design as the British 1937 pattern.

The French army introduced a new woolen serge model in 1946 looking like the British 1937 pattern but with exposed buttons. Although it was intended to be a field uniform, it was mainly used as a winter walking-out uniform until the late 1950s. However, the armée de l'air used it in its dark blue version, until 2010.

A proper cotton combat uniform was introduced in 1947 (Modèle 47) based on a jacket inspired by the US 1943 pattern and loose trousers with two big cargo pockets on each side of the thighs. The same year, a special uniform, also called Modèle 47 was issued to airborne units composed of a large jacket with two breast and two hip cargo pockets. Originally, both "Modèle 47"s were issued in khaki. From 1951 on, the paratroopers' uniform and, in a lesser proportion, the standard Modèle 47 were issued in a three-colour camouflage pattern which gave the uniform the nickname tenue léopard (leopard uniform), but became better known as the TAP47 lizard pattern. It was issued in many colour variants (colourways), saw war service in Indochina and in North-Africa, and was frequently copied by nations in those areas.

The last official issue was the 1956 variant, but its use continued until the end of the war in Algeria. The tenue léopard was a symbol of elite units and was issued only to Foreign Legion and French airborne units. Therefore, it was withdrawn in 1962—officially, to give a standard uniform to the whole of the French army but, less officially, to punish those elite troops which had not behaved well during the conflict. The Modèle 1947 paratroopers uniform continued to be produced in grey-green material (water repellent and herringbone) until 1969, when it was replaced by the Modèle 1964. On another side, the camouflaged uniform was still in use by the French forces in overseas territories until the end of the 1980s; a huge quantity of them was then handed over to Portugal and Israel.

The French army received a new standard battle dress in 1964, roughly based on the principles of the 1947 pattern, but much closer to the body, with zipped breast pockets and made of water repellent grey-green infrared proof material called Satin 300 to protect soldiers against nuclear and chemical agents. Because of a budget shortage at the beginning of the 1980s, this uniform was made of much lighter but much more fragile herringbone material under the name F1. A new variant under the name F2 was introduced at the end of the eighties made of a much stronger material. F1 uniforms were mainly sent to overseas territories.

==== 1990s to present ====
In the 1980s, research results were rejected, because of the similarity to German flecktarn. In 1994, a new four colour camouflage called "Camouflage Central-Europe" and close to the American woodland pattern was adopted and progressively introduced for troops in ex-Yugoslavia. F2 battle dress were produced in camouflaged water repellent or herringbone material from this instant on.

In 1990, desert camouflage was introduced during the Gulf War and F2 battle dress were produced in a hurried effort in a three-colour "Daguet" desert pattern.

In 2012 a redesigned Centre Europe version called T4 Serie 2 is slowly replacing the original F2 cut style. it keeps the same pattern and colors but has a wider cut for more comfort and ease of movements, it has improved pockets placement for body armor use and a more resistant fabric (Rip-Stop). The new uniform is planned in 2 different pattern: Centre Europe (Woodland) and Arid (Desert 'Daguet' style)

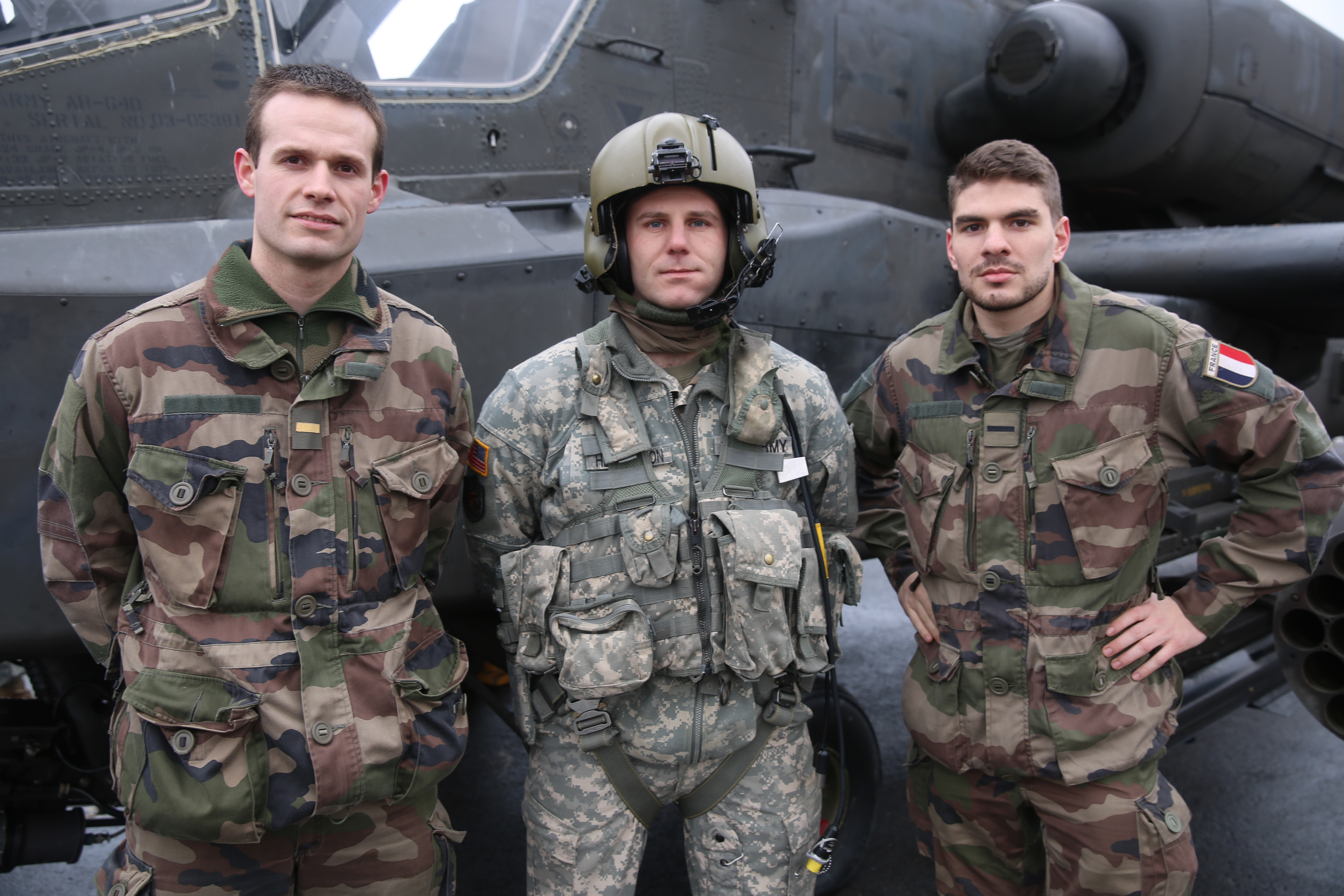
Two French soldiers wearing Camouflage Central-Europe uniforms with jackets.

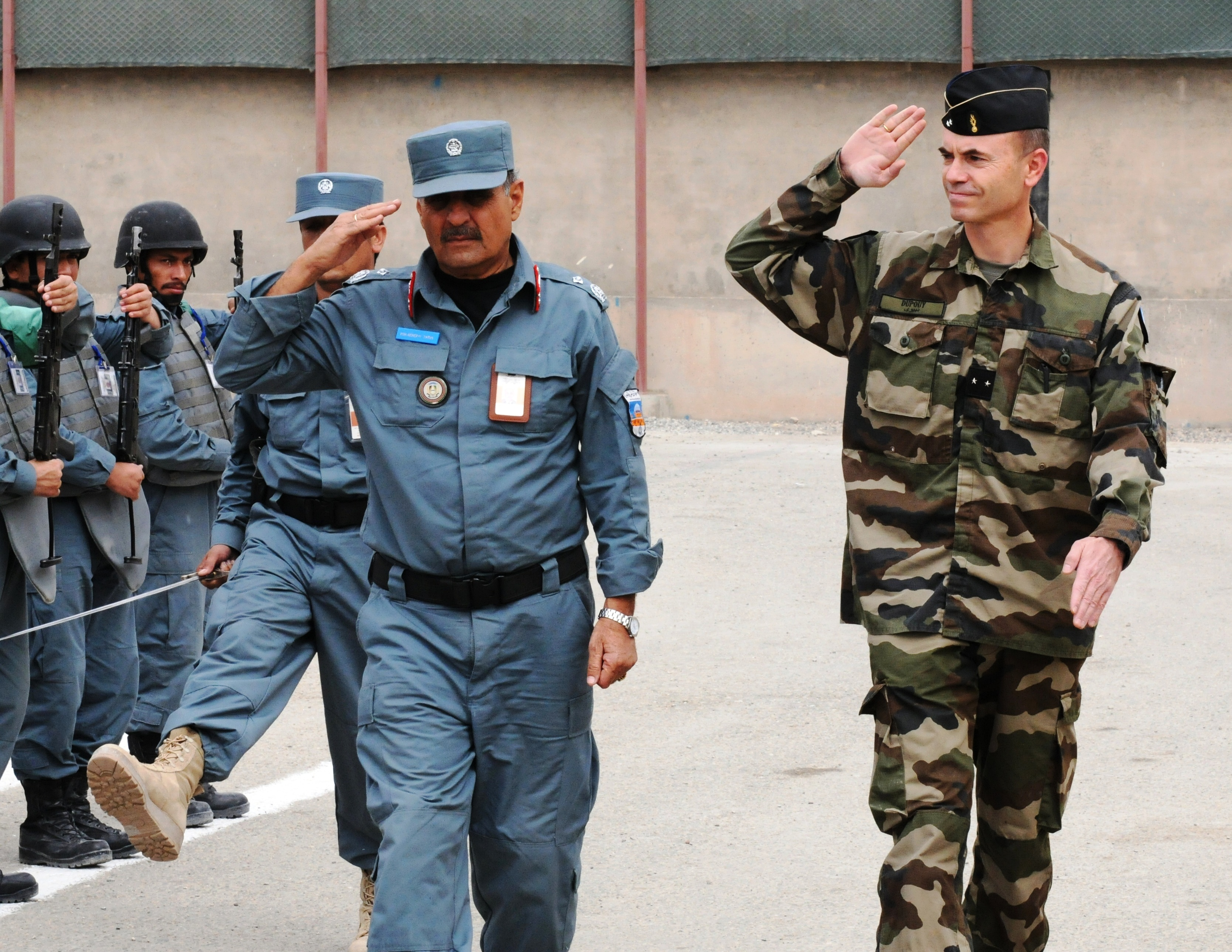
Camouflage Central-Europe with a shirt worn by a French Gendarmerie general, on the right.

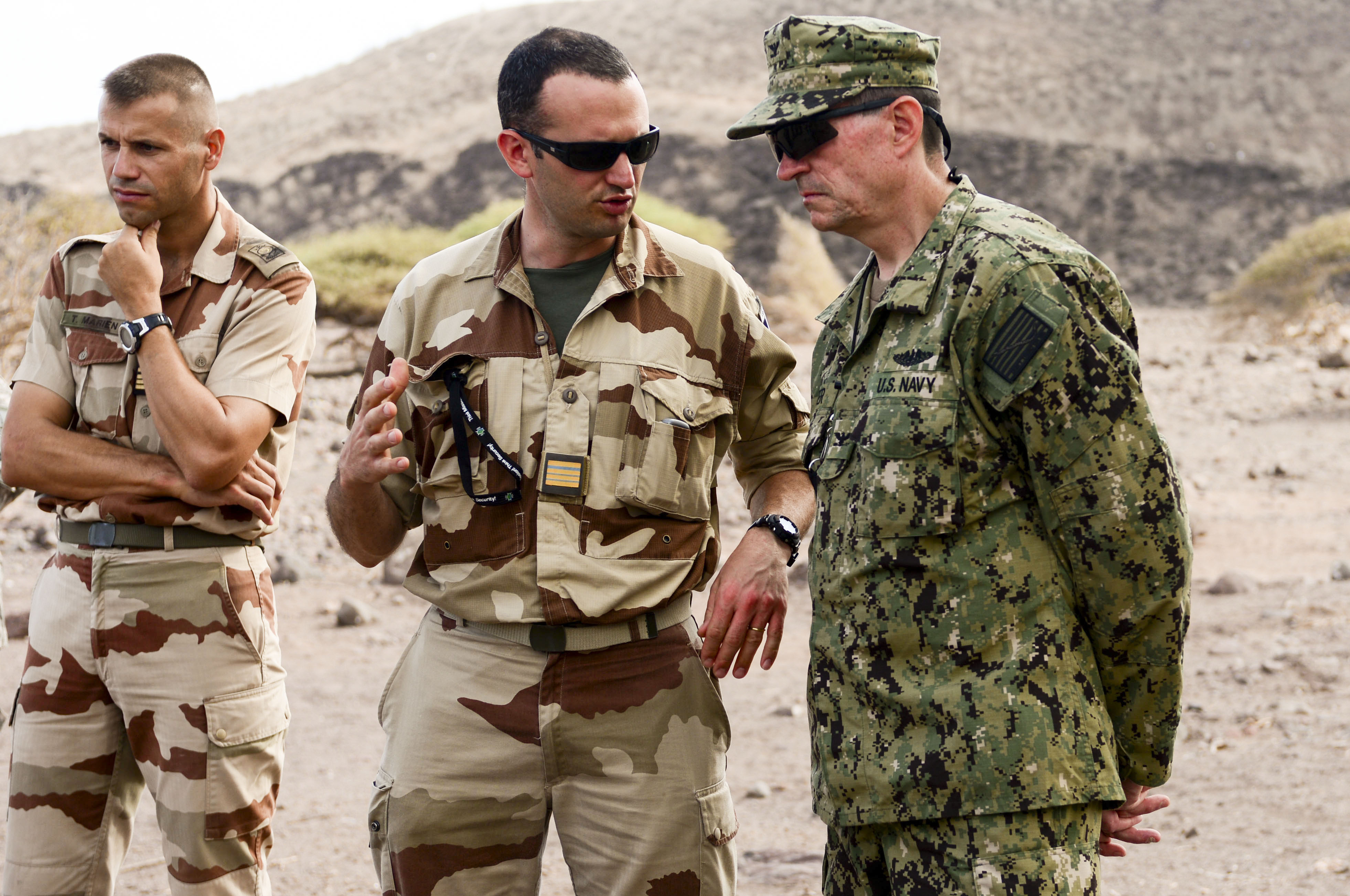
Two French soldiers wearing Camouflage Daguet uniforms.

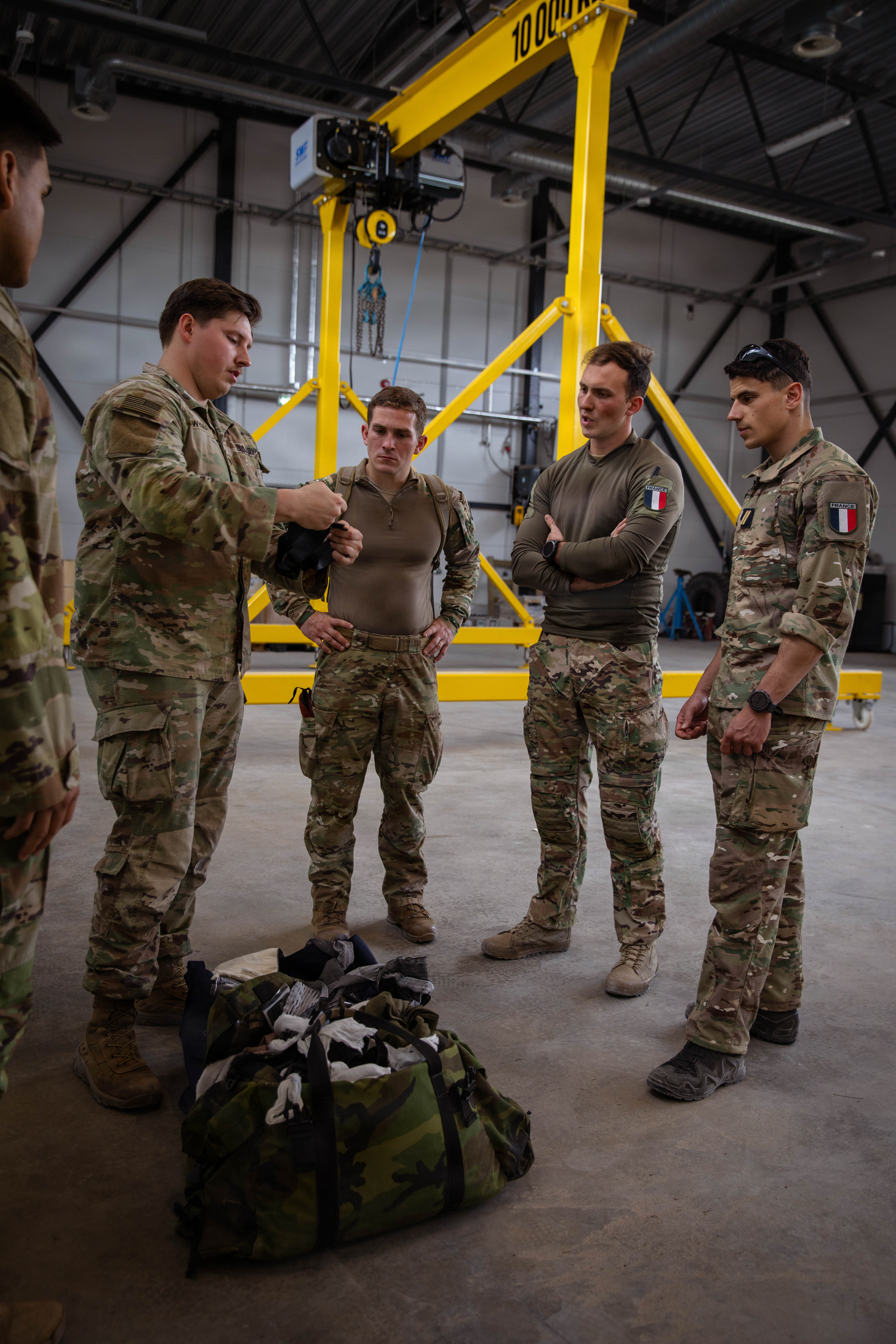
Two members of French Armed Forces wearing the Bariolage Multi-Environnement (BME) combat uniform

In May 2022, the Ministry of Armed Forces announced that it would be replacing older Camouflage Central-Europe with a bariolage multi environnement pattern, developed by the service of the Commissariat of the Armed Forces (SCA) in cooperation with the Technical Section of the Army (STAT). Heavily influenced by US Multicam and British MTP camouflage, this new camouflage will be distributed from 2024.

=== Germany ===
The feldgrau ("field grey") colouring was adopted by the German Empire in 1910.

==== World War II ====
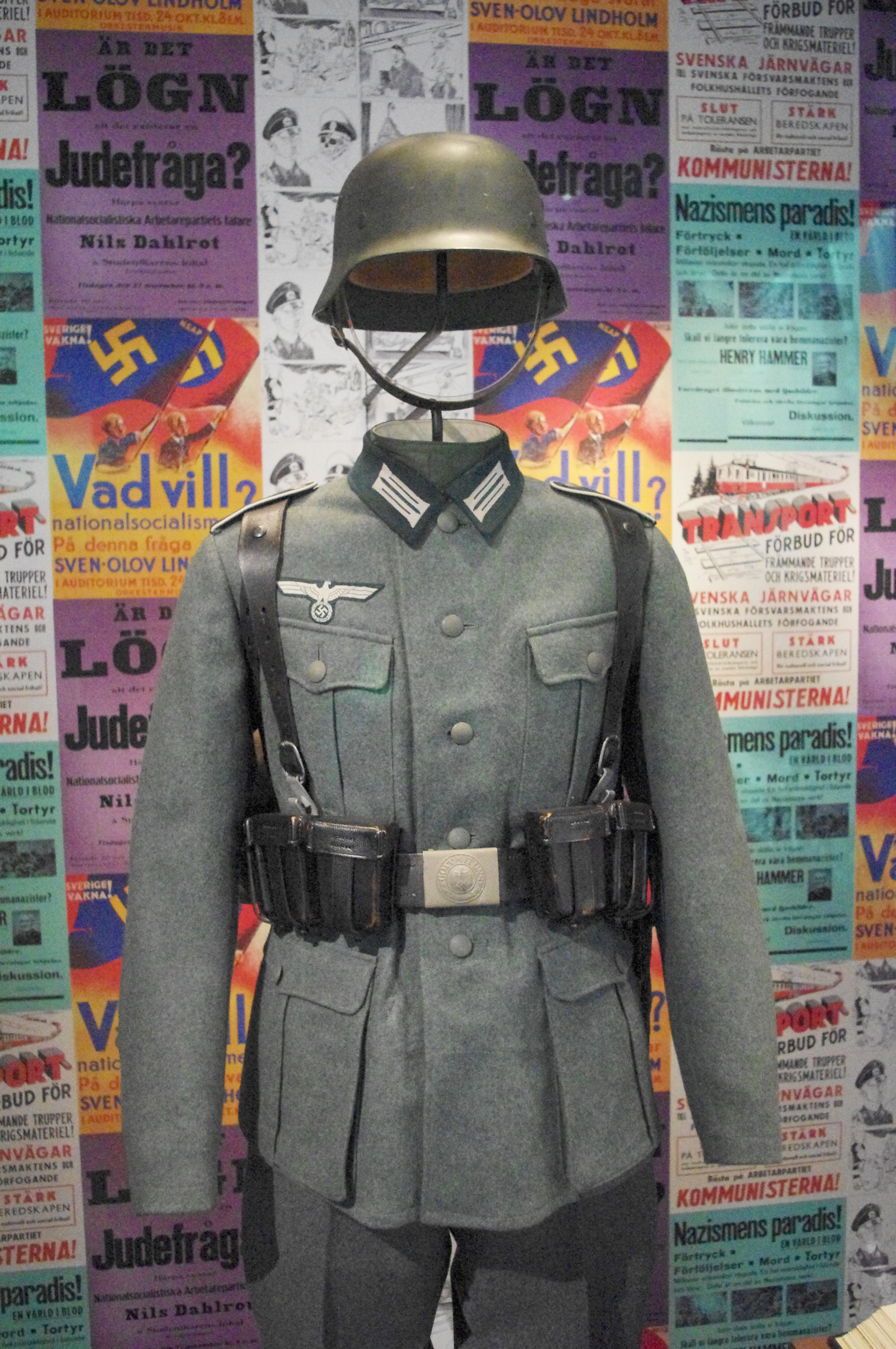
M36 uniform worn by enlisted Wehrmacht infantry.

Nazi Germany funded a great deal of research on camouflage uniforms, investigating many patterns including NIR camouflage. After much trial the Oberkommando der Wehrmacht, in 1938, issued the basic four-colour "plane tree" pattern (Platanenmuster) of Schick and Schmid in the form of camouflage smocks to units of the Waffen SS. The three-colour disruptive Splittermuster, more commonly known in English as 'splinter pattern', was issued to the army beginning before the war, in the form of camouflaged tent quarters (zeltbahn) which was reversible, with a splinter pattern in dark colours on one side, and light coloured on the other.

From 1942, a year after the Luftwaffe started producing jump smocks in this pattern, a variety of helmet covers and camouflage smocks were adopted for the army. A distinctive variant of splinter pattern camouflage was introduced midway through the war, a blurry marsh pattern (Sumpfmuster) referred to as "tan water pattern" in English by collectors. During the war, additional SS variants including "palm", "smoke", and "oak leaf" were introduced, in spring and autumn colours. By 1944 the complex "peas" pattern (Erbsenmuster) was also used by the Waffen SS issued as standard, in tunic and trouser combinations, but never in smocks or caps. Initially, camouflage had been a sign of elite troops and the SS continued this differentiation by using its own distinctive patterns.

In 1941, during the winter on the Eastern Front, German troops were at a considerable disadvantage because they lacked winter camouflage. In 1945, a five-colour Leibermuster design was introduced. Intended to be used by all the armed forces, it was layered to improve effectiveness at distance, used a new print method to reduce obvious repetition, and included NIR protection. Due to the distribution situation, it was issued to eastern units only. After WW2, this became the standard camouflage pattern for the Swiss armed forces.

==== Post-war ====
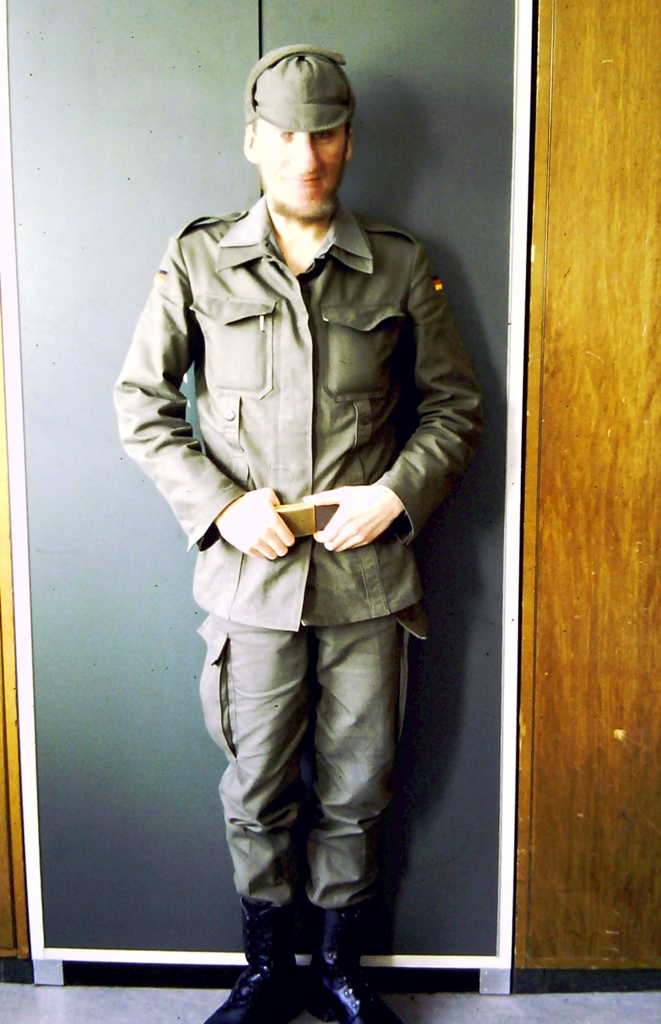
A soldier of the Bundeswehr in plain olive green combat uniform, 1982.

In the 1950s, West Germany's Bundeswehr used two versions of the wartime "splinter", a four-colour pattern called BV-Splittermuster. Thereafter, from 1961 until 1990 they used the so-called olive-green battle dress. Following various trials, the dots-and-blotches five-colour Flecktarn pattern was chosen in 1976 and issued from the mid-1980s. Reserve forces remained in old olive-green battle dress as late as 1994.

East Germany's Nationale Volksarmee first pattern was the 1956 Russisches Tarnmuster based, as the name suggests, on the Soviet "amoeba" designs. It was soon replaced by the four-colour Flächentarnmuster pattern (sometimes called "potato" or "splotch"). In 1965, the dense straight-line two-colour Strichmuster pattern was introduced, sometimes called "ein Strich – kein Strich", it remained in use until reunification.

Flecktarn was made the pattern for the unified country in 1990. Tropentarn is the desert variant of Flecktarn.

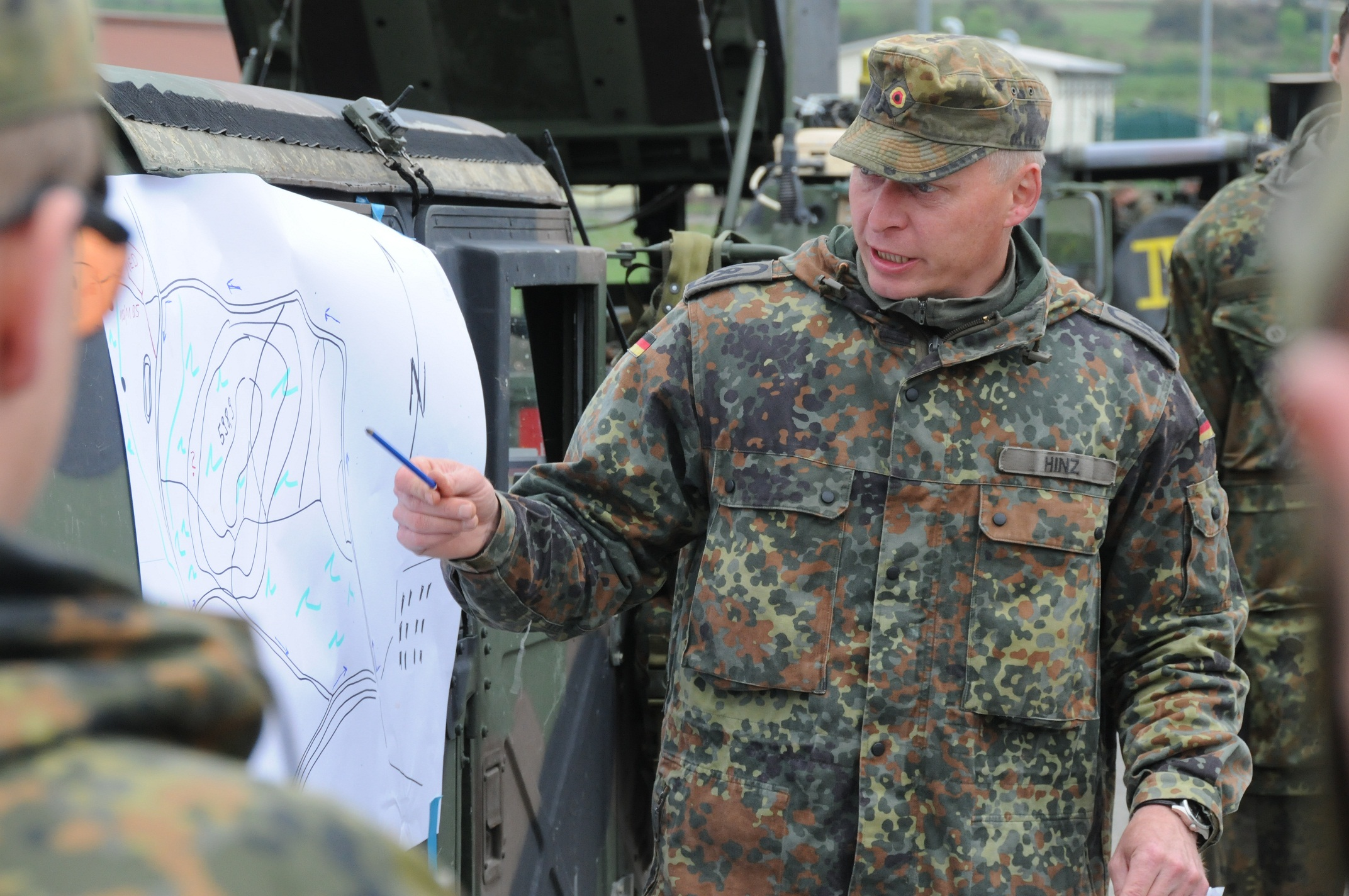
Flecktarn parka and cap.

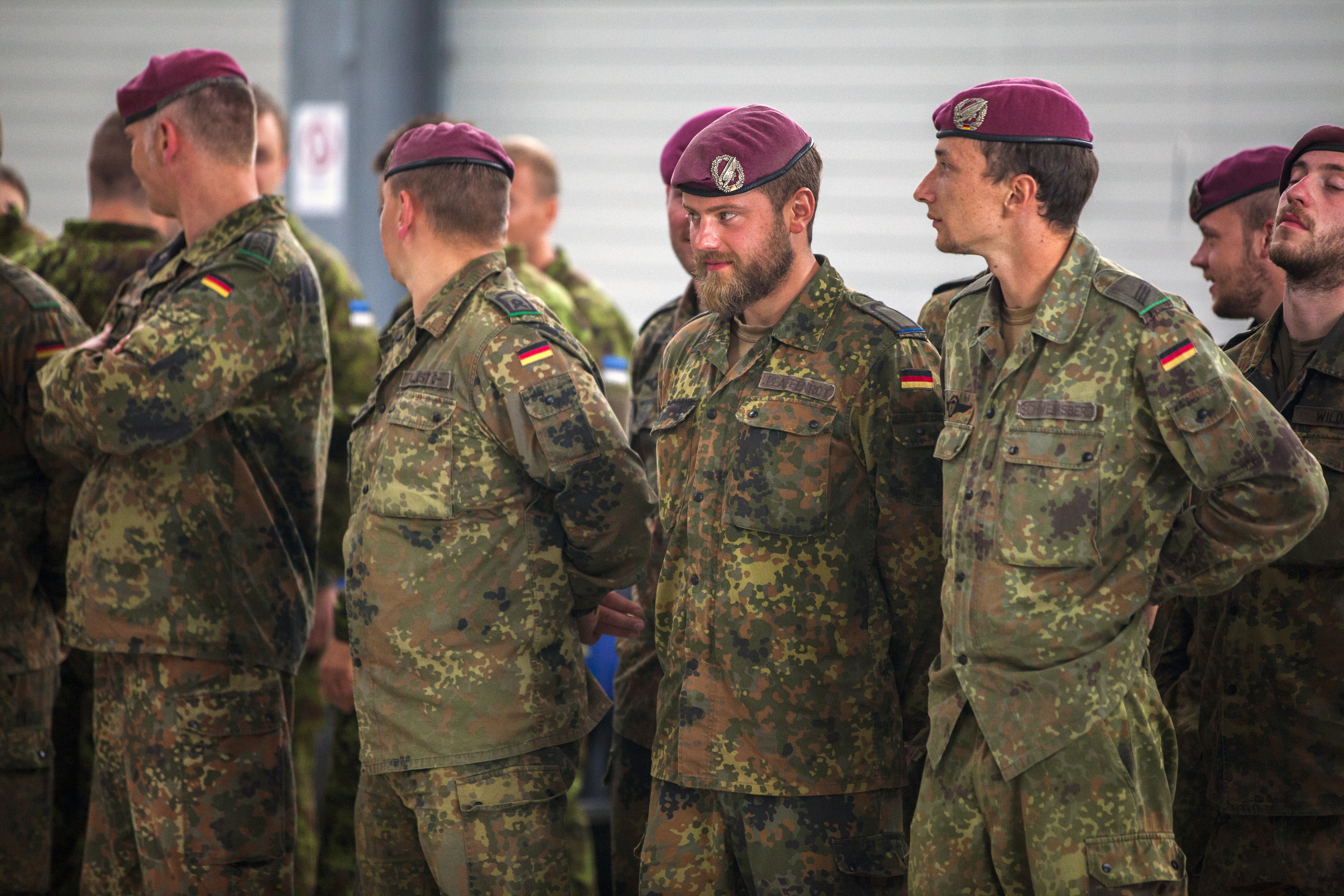
German soldiers wearing Flecktarn shirts and trousers.

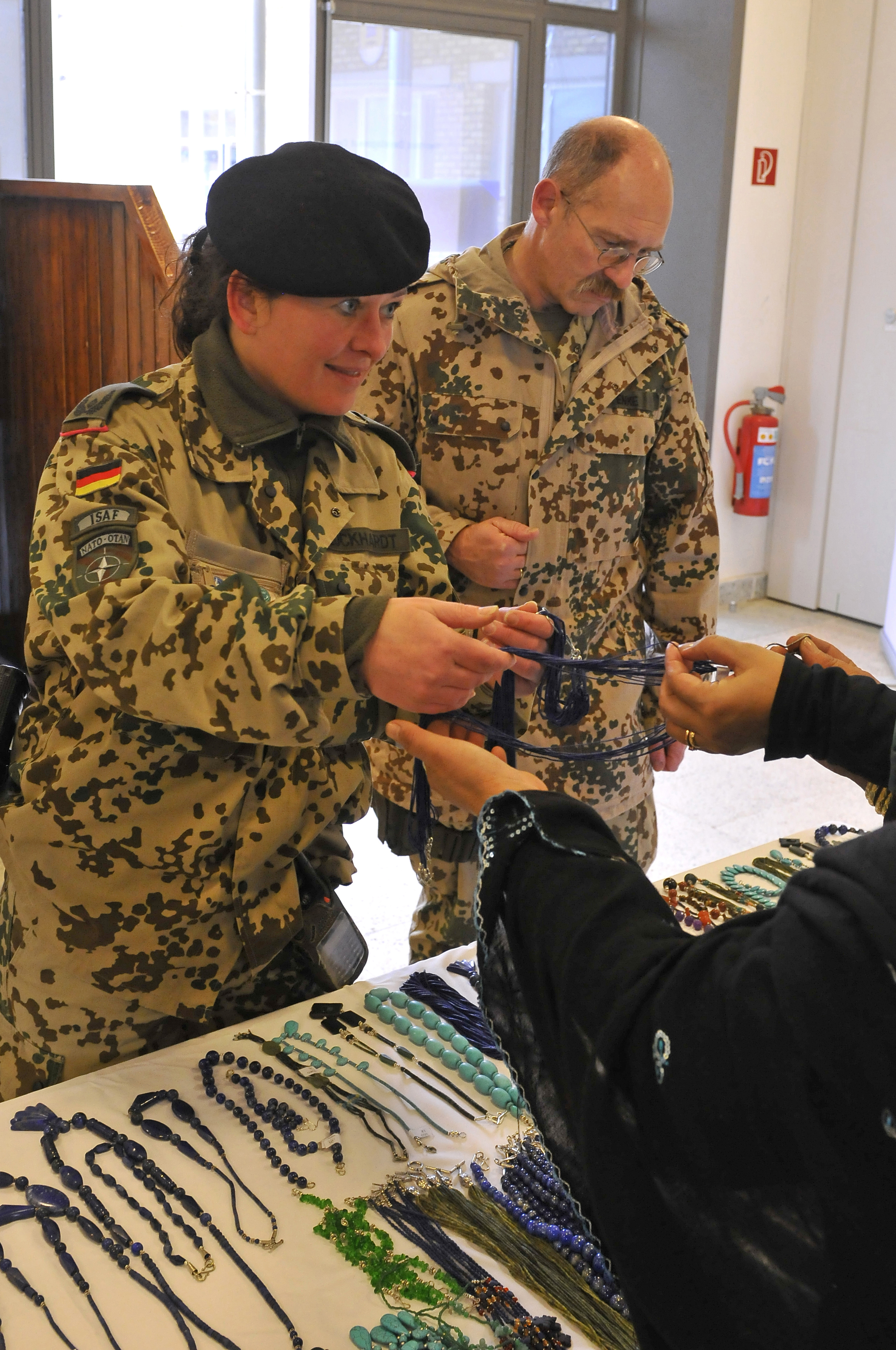
Tropentarn shirt and parka.

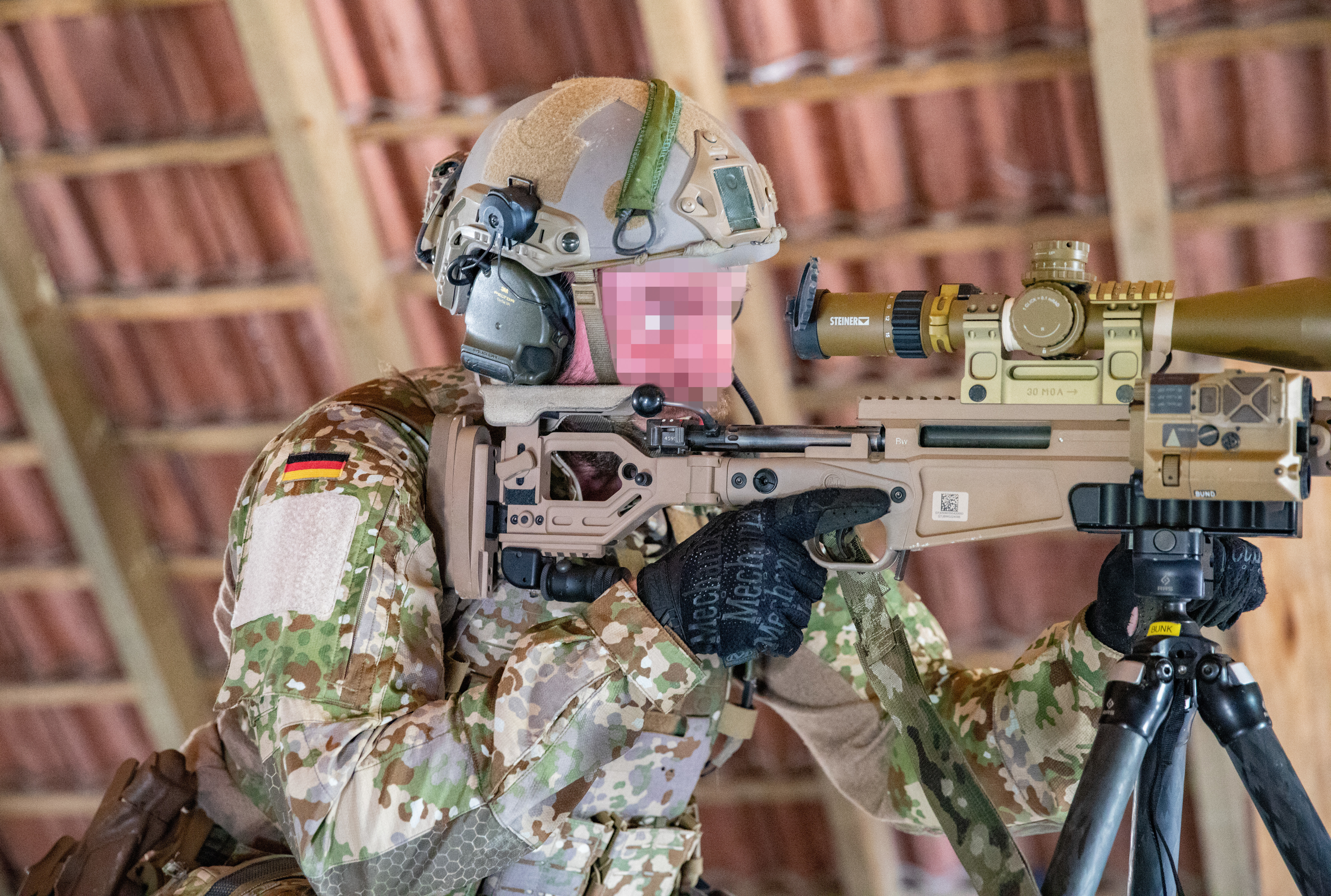
A German KSK member wearing the new Bundeswehr Multitarn camo pattern.

===== Multitarn =====
In 2016, tests were conducted by the Research Institute of materials and property of the Bundeswehr (Wehrwissenschaftliche Institut für Werk- und Betriebsstoffe – WIWeB) on a new pattern designated Multitarn as a potential replacement for flecktarn. The pattern is a six-color fleck pattern with similar colors to Crye Precision MultiCam which has seen widespread adoption by many international special forces including the Bundeswehr Kommando Spezialkräfte (KSK).

The pattern is intended as a multi-terrain pattern, initially for use only by German special forces. The Bundeswehr initially expressed plans for adoption by multiple divisions of the Bundeswehr to complement existing flecktarn patterns but as of 2022 this has not occurred. Unlike with its previous Flecktarn patterns the Bundeswehr has taken strict measures over its property rights and distribution control to prevent unauthorized and illegal production of the pattern outside the Bundeswehr's authorized contractors.

=== Indonesia ===
In the Indonesian National Armed Forces, the combat uniform is known as "PDL" (Pakaian Dinas Lapangan; translated as Field uniform), and is categorized into five types, PDL I (No. 1), PDL II (No. 2), PDL II A (No. 2A), PDL III (No. 3), and PDL IV (No. 4).

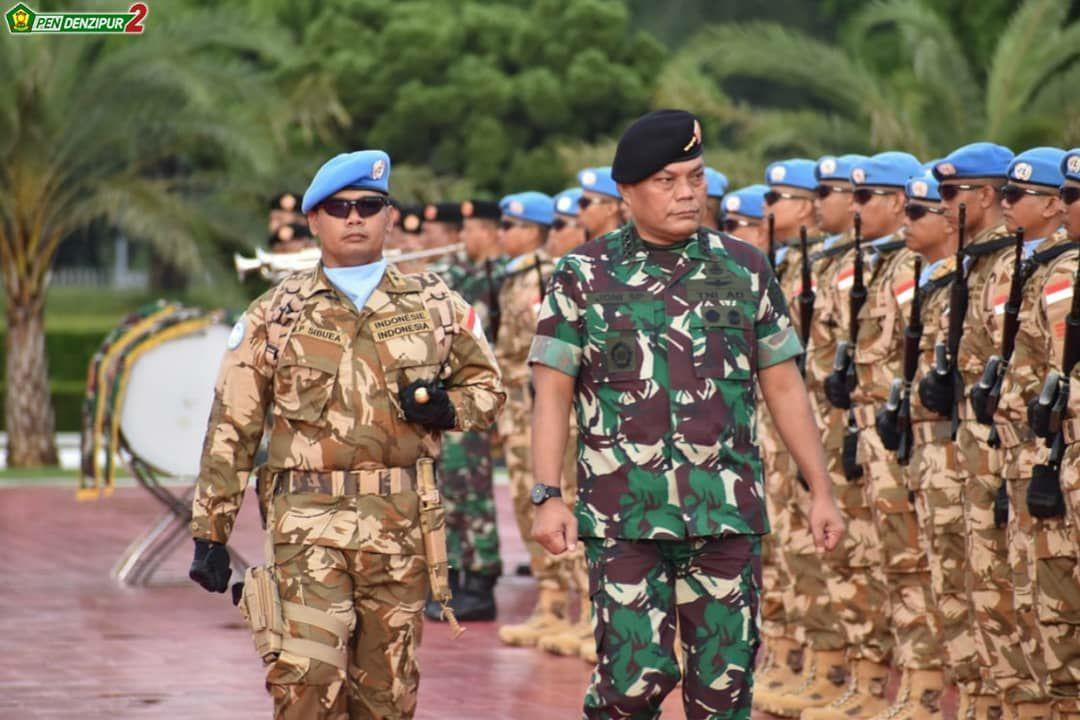
Indonesian soldiers of the Garuda Contingent. One is dressed in a temperate variant of DPM while most have a four-colour desert variant of the uniform.

The general combat uniform of the Indonesian National Armed Forces uses the Disruptive Pattern Material (DPM), which was adopted in 1984. This pattern is sometimes called "Loreng Malvinas". Aside from general combat uniforms of the national armed forces, each branch also has its own specific camouflage pattern. Around the middle of 2011, the navy adopted a new camouflage design for ship crews. The design is known locally as Loreng Layar, or "sailing camouflage". The Air Force officially adopted a pixelated camouflage design utilizing black, grey, off-white, blue-grey and medium blue, on 5 October 2015, to mark the service's anniversary. It also incorporates (non-pixelated) images of aircraft into the pattern. On 2 March 2022, the army unveiled its combat uniform with a new camouflage pattern, called Loreng Angkatan Darat (Army camo pattern).

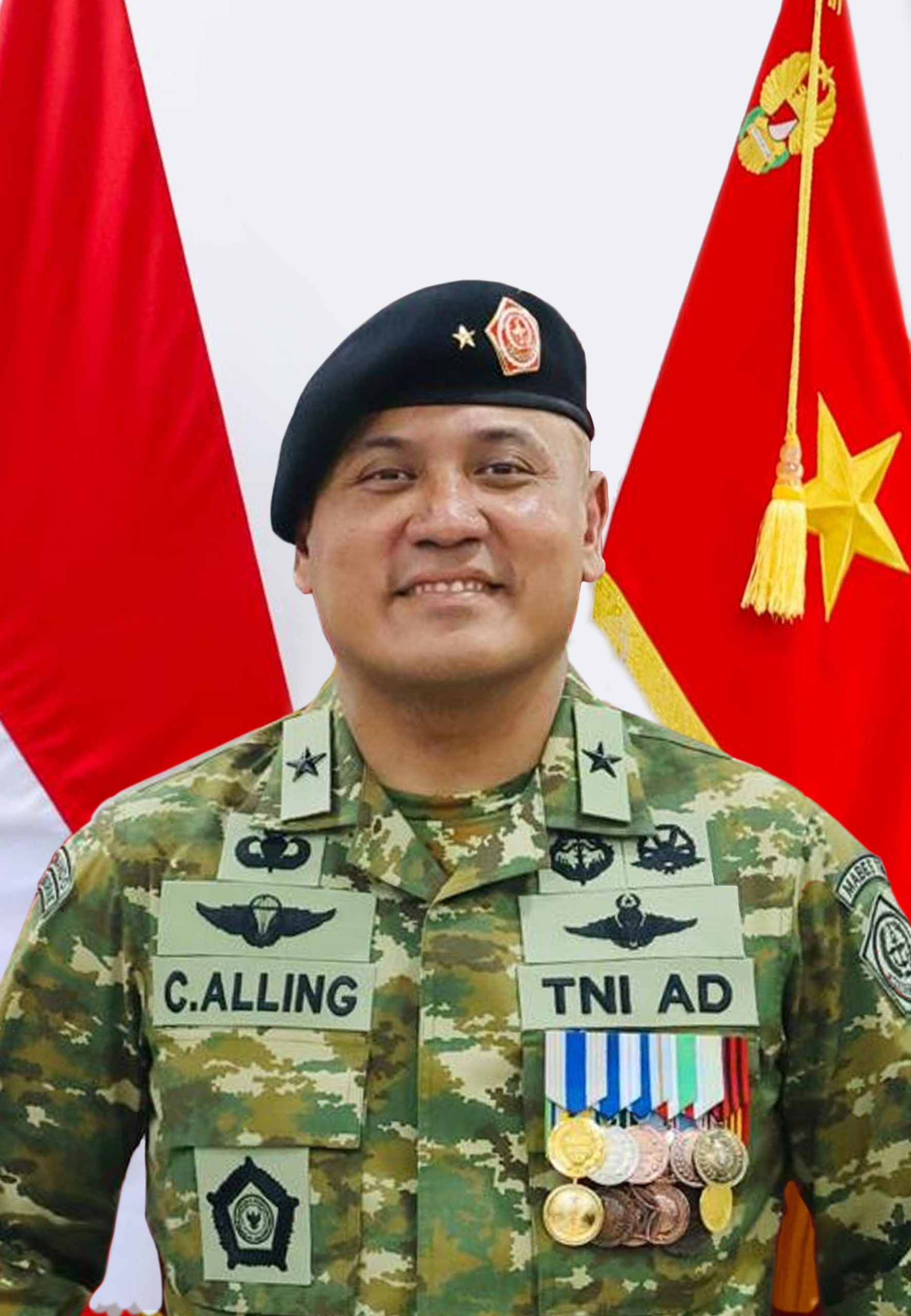
Member from the Indonesian National Armed Forces wearing a new field uniform featuring a digital camouflage pattern called "sage green camo pattern" (now "TNI PRIMA" pattern).

On 3 October 2025, the Indonesian National Armed Forces introduced a new field uniform featuring a digital camouflage pattern called "sage green digital" or "Loreng Trimatra" (Tri-Service camo pattern). And now the name of this field uniform was later changed to PDL TNI Prima on 21st January 2026. Officially replacing the DPM camouflage that had been in use since 1982. The new pattern is planned to be adopted simultaneously on 5 October 2025, coinciding with the celebration of the National Armed Forces' 80th anniversary.

Units and formations within the armed forces such as the Kopassus, Raider Infantry, Kostrad, Marine Corps, Kopaska and Paskhas have their own distinctive camouflage pattern designs for their field uniforms which resemble their identity, but are only worn during special occasions such as military parades. Members of the armed forces who are assigned to the Garuda Contingent wear a desert variant of the DPM camouflage pattern.

=== Iran ===
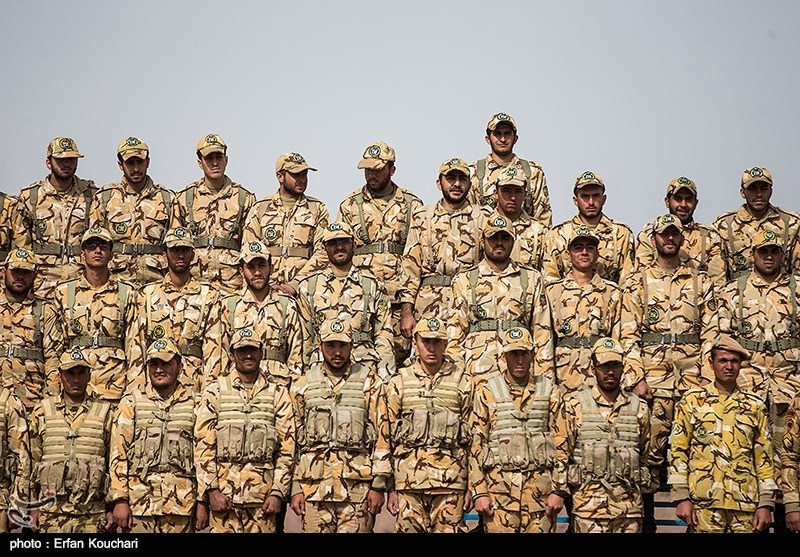
Iranian Army personnel outfitted with modified DPM

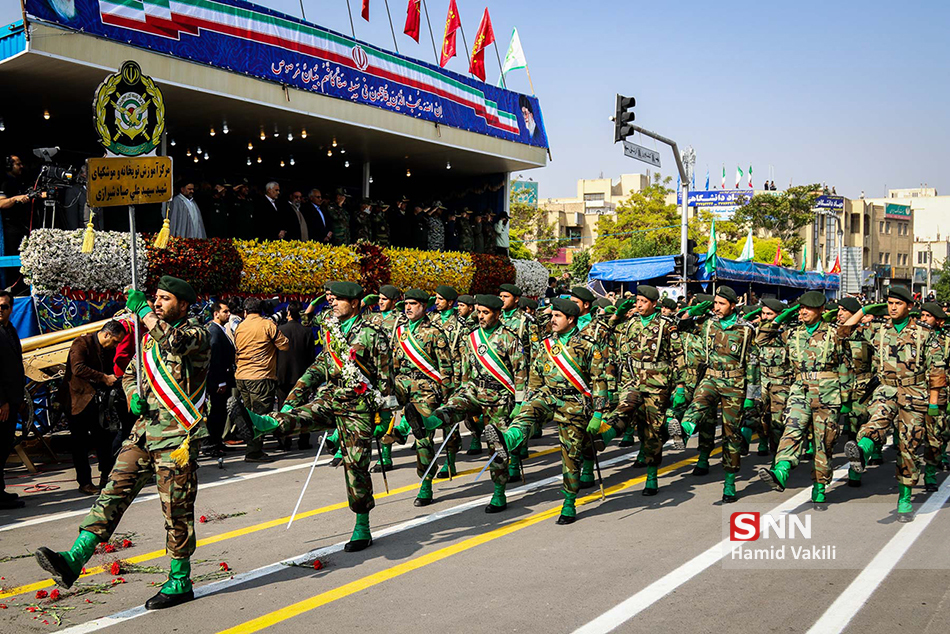
Iranian Army personnel outfitted with U.S. Woodland.

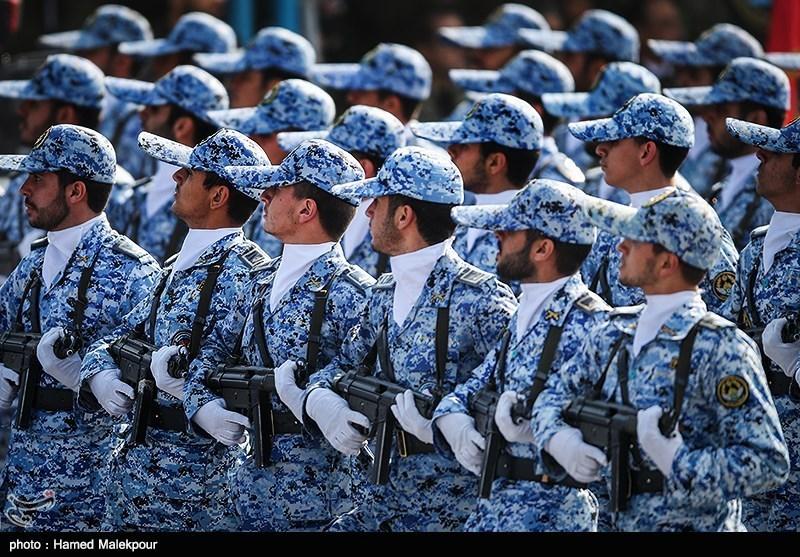
Members of Iranian Air Force outfitted with distinct pixelated camo pattern

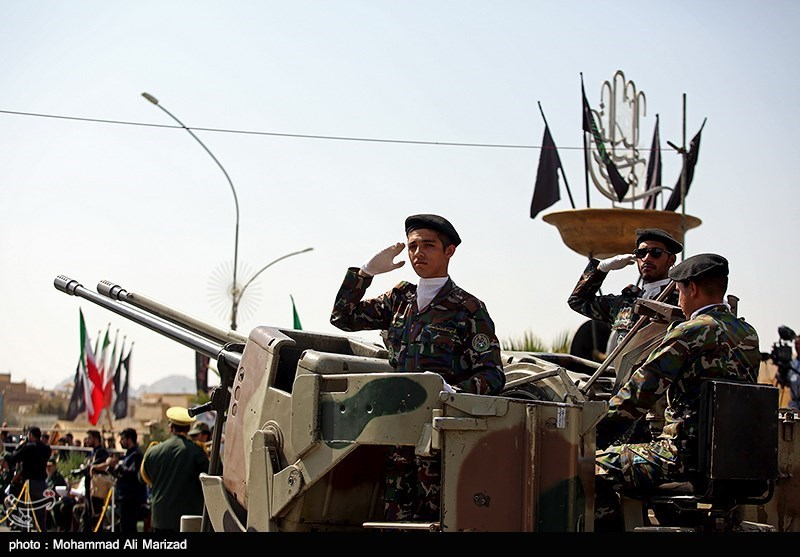
Iranian Air Defence Forces personnel outfitted with distinct camo pattern

Iran issues an arctic blue camo for the Army air force, and a green and brown forest camo with splotches of electric blue for the Army Air Defence Force.

=== Italy ===
The Italian Army used grigio-verde in the Alps from 1906 and across the army from 1909. In 1929, the country was the first to mass-produce camouflage fabric, the three-colour telo mimetico pattern. It was initially used as shelter halves, and not issued as uniform until 1942.

The pattern remained in use after the war, moving through several colour variations. The marines adopted a complex five-colour "Mediterranean spray" pattern in the 1980s. In 1990, a new army pattern was introduced, a four-colour named "Vegetata"; a desert version was also issued from 1992.

=== Japan ===
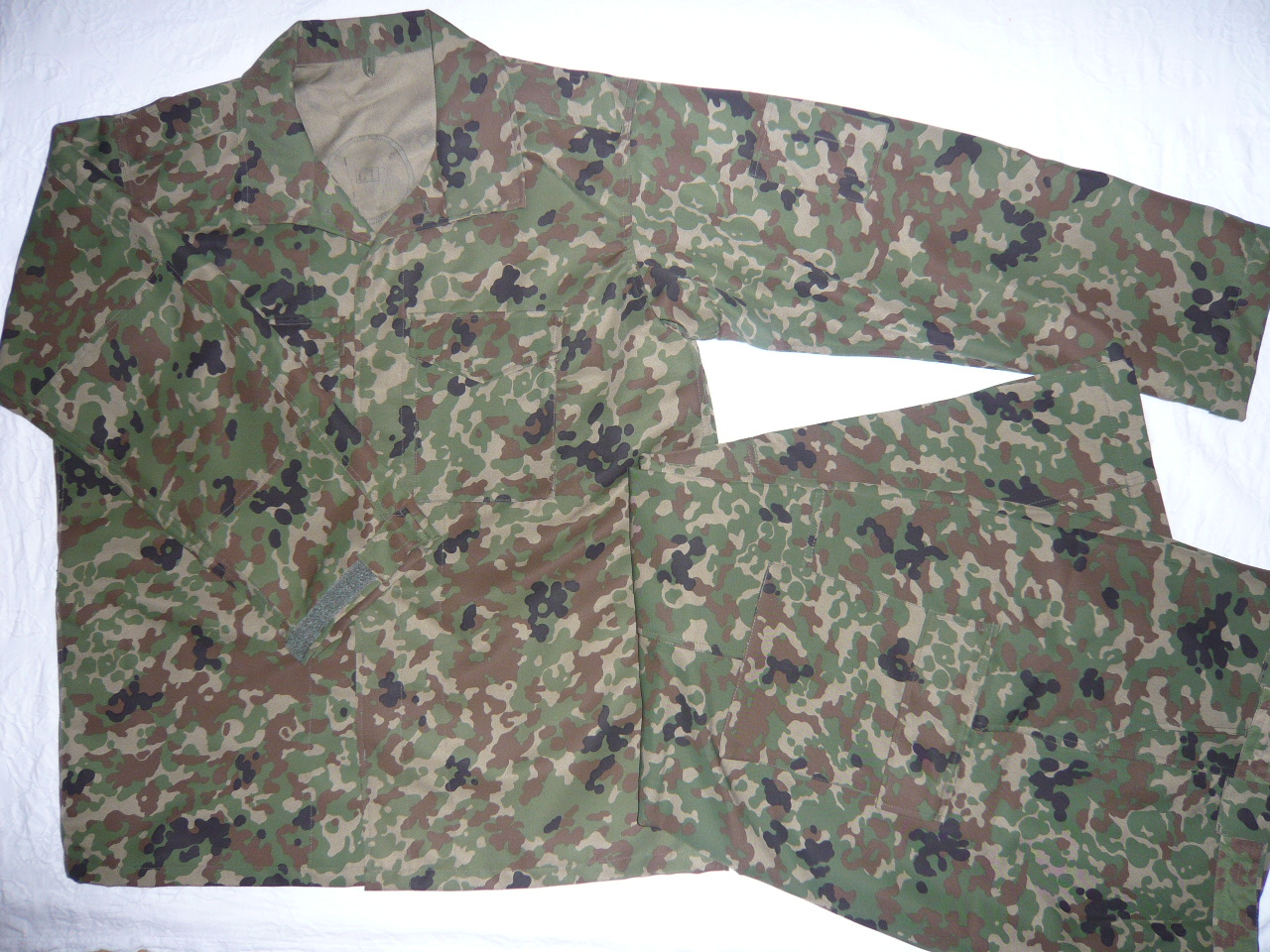
Shirt and trousers used in the Japan Self-Defense Forces combat uniform

Japan tried monochrome green during the 1905 conflict with Russia, but entered World War II with monochrome mustard khaki uniforms. Some were fitted with special loops to aid the attachment of natural vegetation.

The Japan Self-Defense Forces did not issue a pattern until the 1980s, choosing a four-colour green-and-brown design, sometimes called "fang". It was succeeded in 1991 by a dot pattern close to flecktarn, while during the Gulf War a six-colour pattern similar to the United States Desert Battle Dress Uniform was used.

=== South Korea (Republic of Korea) ===
In the years following the establishment of the Republic of Korea and during the Korean War (1950–1953), the ROK Armed Forces relied heavily on U.S. military surplus equipment and uniforms. Soldiers commonly wore the U.S. M1943 and M1951 field uniforms, which were olive drab in color and included items such as the M1 helmet, wool field jackets, and herringbone twill (HBT) fatigues.

There was little to no camouflage patterning during this era, and uniforms were largely standardized based on U.S. practices. The use of such surplus continued throughout the 1950s and into the 1960s.

==== Vietnam War and Camouflage Introduction (1960s–1980s) ====
South Korea deployed several divisions to Vietnam between 1964 and 1973. During this period, ROK special forces units adopted tiger stripe camouflage patterns, similar to those used by U.S. and ARVN forces, but often manufactured in Korea with slight variations in color and pattern.

By the late 1970s and early 1980s, the ROK Army, and Navy began adopting several camouflages but its for their special units.

==== Woodland Era (1990s–2000s) ====
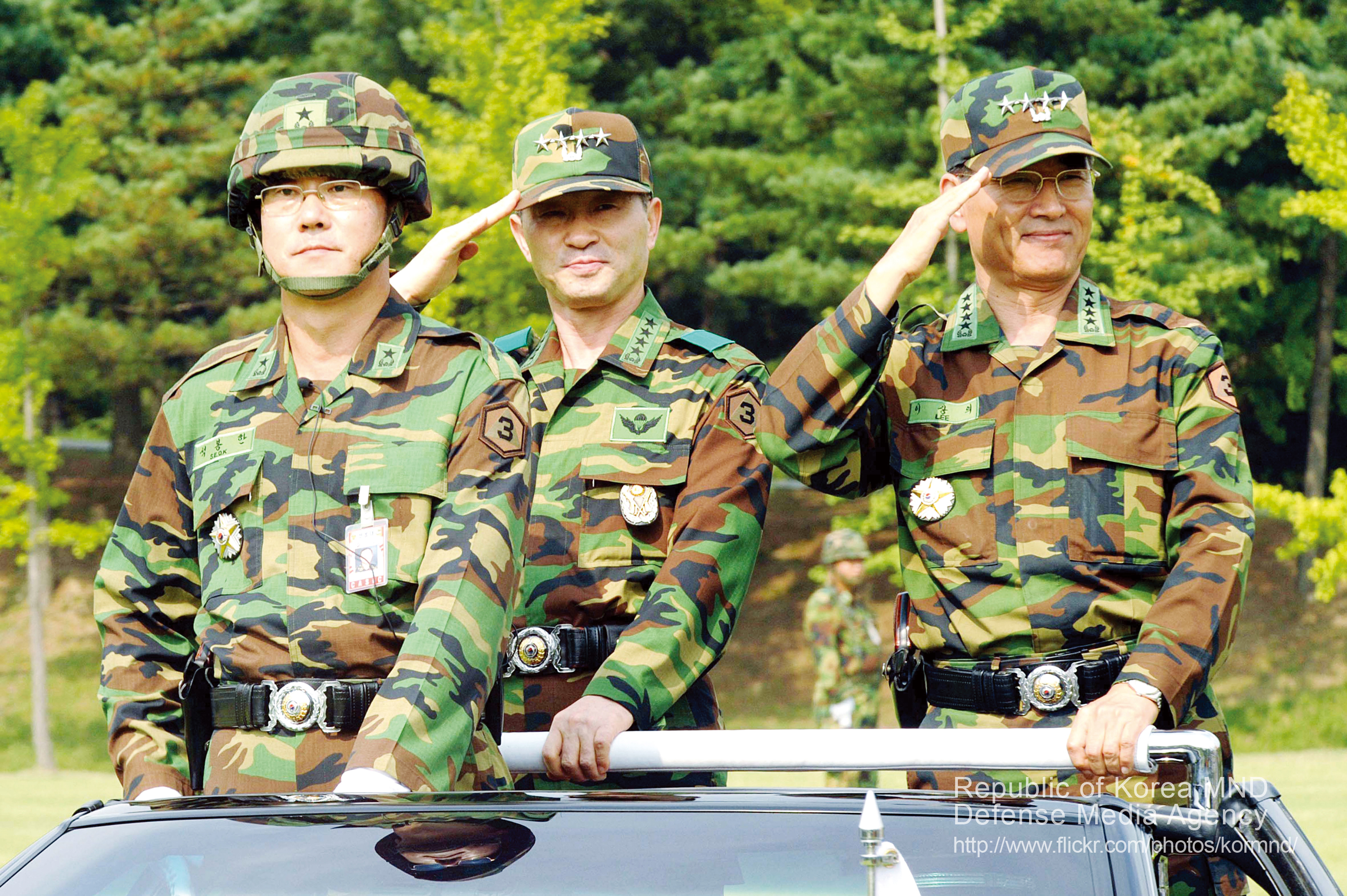
Commander of 3rd Army and two ROKA Generals outfitted with Tonghab camouflage.

In the early 1990s, the ROK Armed Forces transitioned to a new camouflage pattern influenced by the U.S. M81 Woodland design. The Tonghab (통합 or "integrated"), this camouflage became standard issue for ROK Army personnel and remained in use for nearly two decades.

Key features of the uniform included ripstop fabric, reinforced stitching, and a subdued woodland camouflage color scheme consisting of green, brown, black, and tan. Specialized units, including the ROK Special Warfare Command, sometimes used modified versions for overseas deployment, including desert or arid variants.

==== Digital Camouflage and TAKA Pattern (2011–present) ====
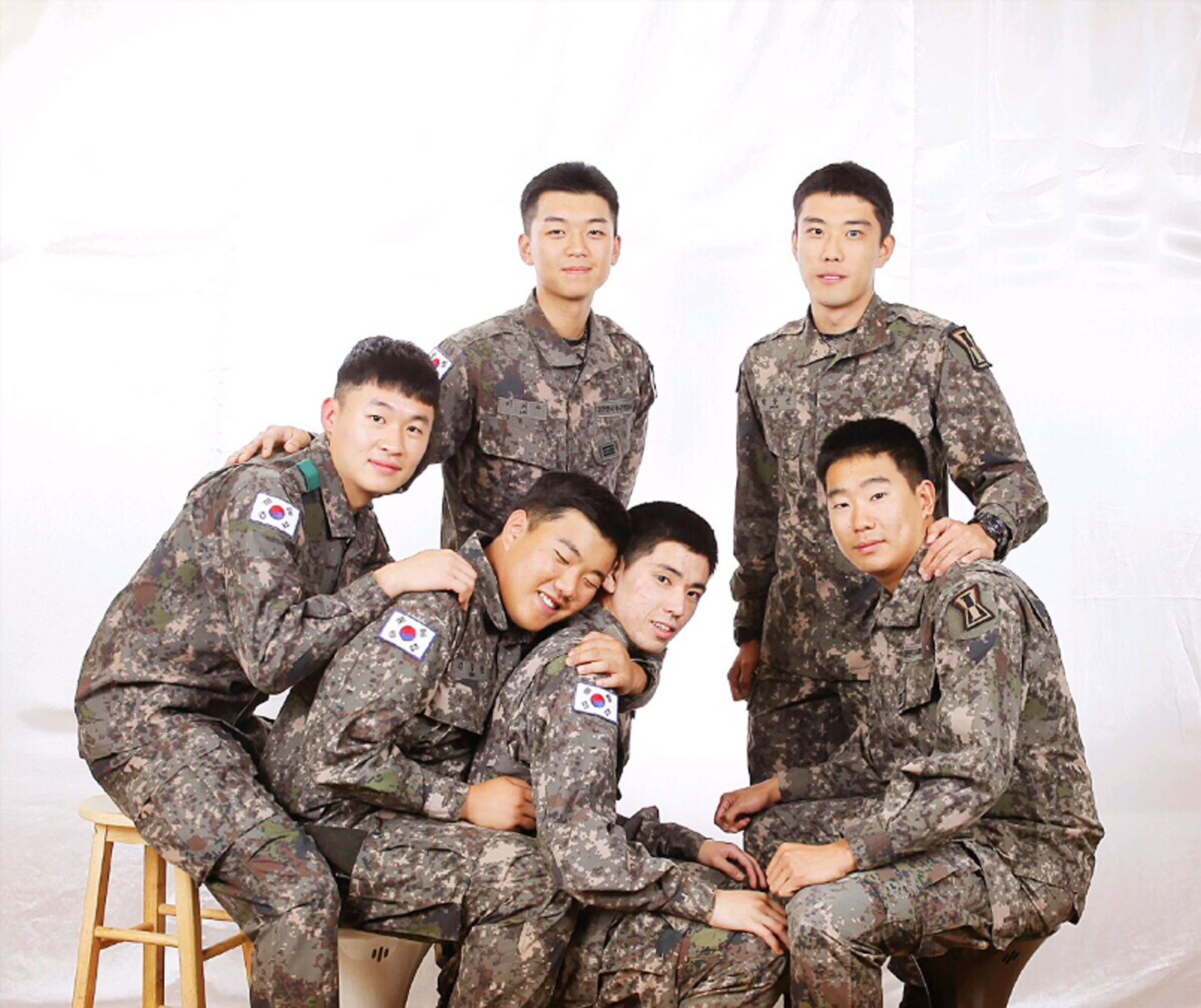
ROK Army from 1st Corps wearing Granite B field uniform.

In 2011, the ROK Armed Forces began a phased introduction of the Digital Combat Uniform (DCU) using the indigenous TAKA pattern (an acronym for Tactical Korea Army). Known as Granite B. This marked the ROK’s transition to digital camouflage, aligning with global trends in military uniform design.

The TAKA pattern consisted of a pixelated design tailored to Korea's mountainous and mixed-vegetation terrain. The uniform included improved materials with flame resistance, Velcro closures, modular pockets, and identifiers in Hangul, including name tags and branch insignia.

Each military branch adopted branch-specific variants:

- ROK Army & Air Force: Standard green-gray TAKA digital camouflage.
- ROK Navy: Blue-gray digital pattern suitable for maritime environments.
- ROK Marine Corps: Known as 물결무늬 (Wave pattern) - aka WAVEPAT - or 해병 디지털 (Marine digital).

=== New Zealand ===
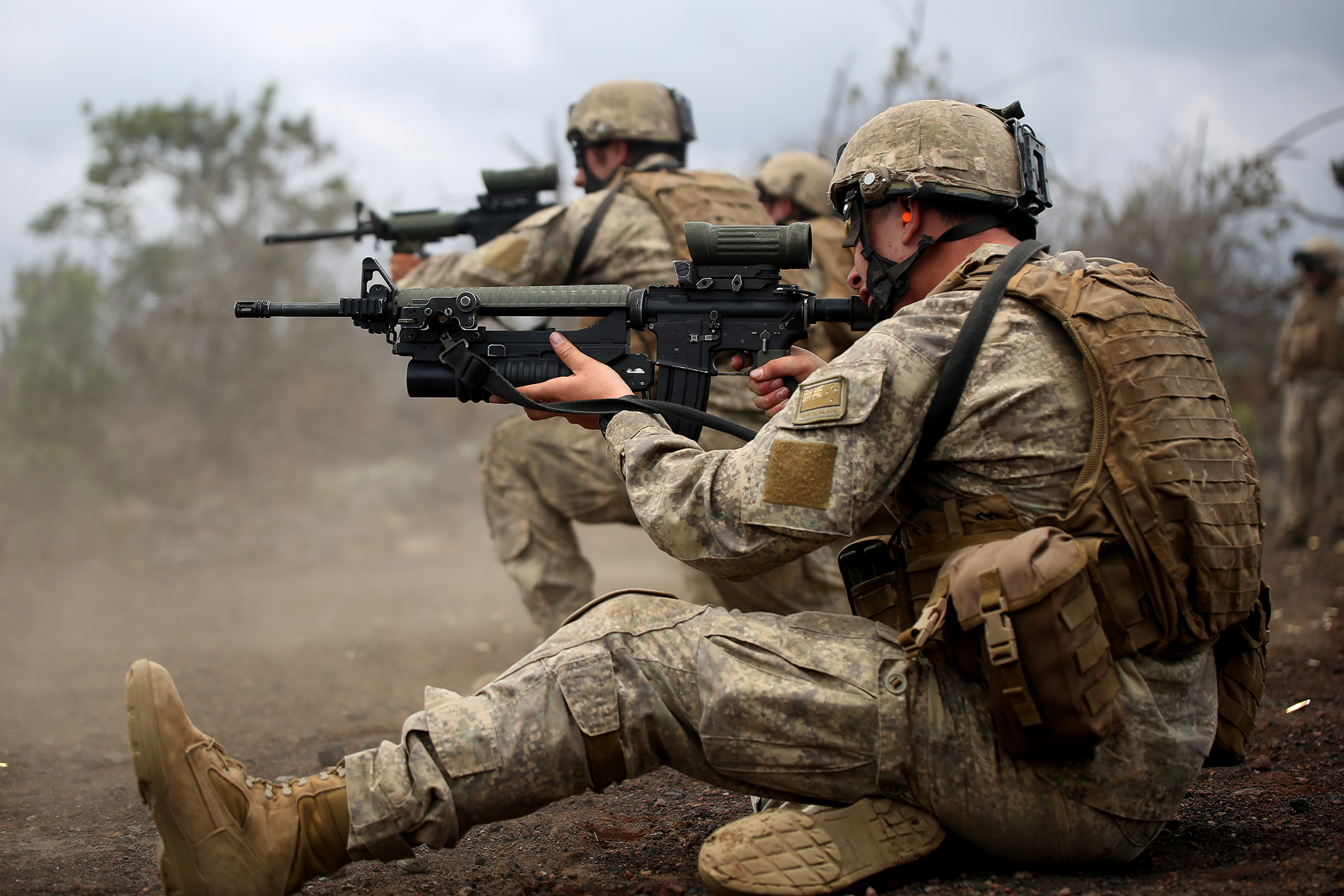
NZ Army soldiers from RNZIR wearing MCU camouflage pattern, in service from 2013 to 2020.

Being of a Commonwealth country, New Zealand's armed forces generally followed British-style uniforms for most of the 20th century, with New Zealanders adopting British Battledress during World War II and Korea, and British "Jungle Greens" in Malaya and Borneo while serving in the 28th Commonwealth Infantry Brigade. During the Vietnam War New Zealand forces wore Australian Jungle Greens. NZ Special Air Service (NZSAS) troopers wore U.S-issue BDUs in ERDL camouflage during Vietnam and thereafter until the adoption of camouflage for all branches of service in 1980.

British Disruptive Pattern Material camouflage was the basis of what eventually evolved into New Zealand disruptive pattern material which became the standard camouflage pattern for the New Zealand Defence Force from 1980 until 2013 when it was replaced by a New Zealand-only digital camouflage called New Zealand Multi Terrain Camouflage (NZMTP) manufactured by Canadian company Hyperstealth Biotechnology Corp. The pattern has since been officially replaced with Multi-Terrain Pattern by Crye Precision. Crye Precision's off-the-shelf Multicam pattern from which MTP is derived was used by NZ SAS forces in Afghanistan.

The cut of the current New Zealand combat uniforms is similar to the modern U.S. Army Combat Uniform. It entered into service in 2008, was modified in 2013, and reverted in 2019.

=== Russia ===
==== Imperial era ====
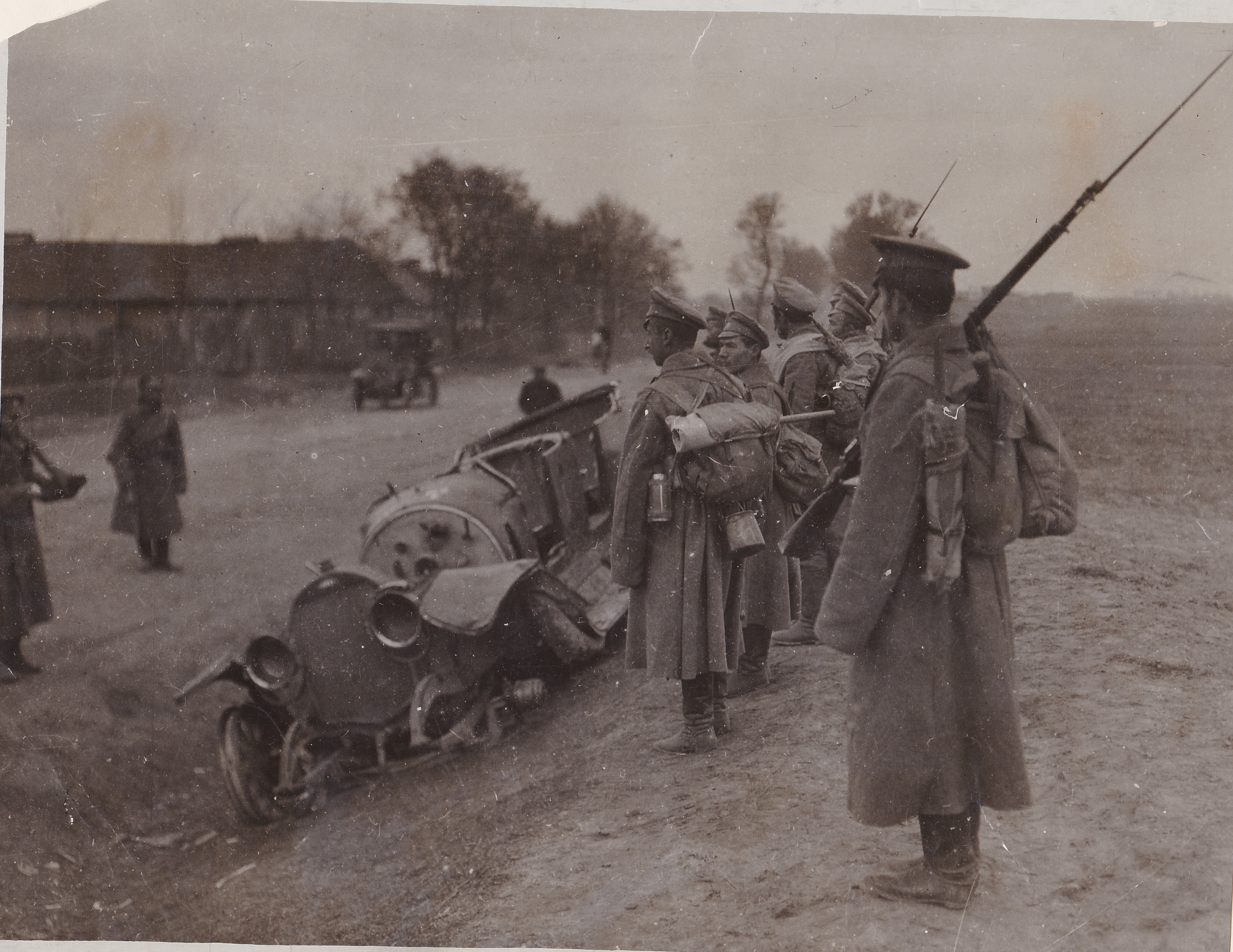
Imperial Russian Army soldiers inspect an auto wreckage, 1915

The Imperial Russian Army fought mostly in dark green colours (introduced by Peter the Great in 1700), even if several branches (Life Guards regiments, dragoons, hussars and uhlans) dressed in distinctive and colourful attire. Cossack regiments were reported to use basic camouflage patterns and techniques during the Crimean War. Duller colours were used unofficially in the 1880s and again in 1905. The whole army began using khaki for field dress from 1908 on.

==== Soviet era ====
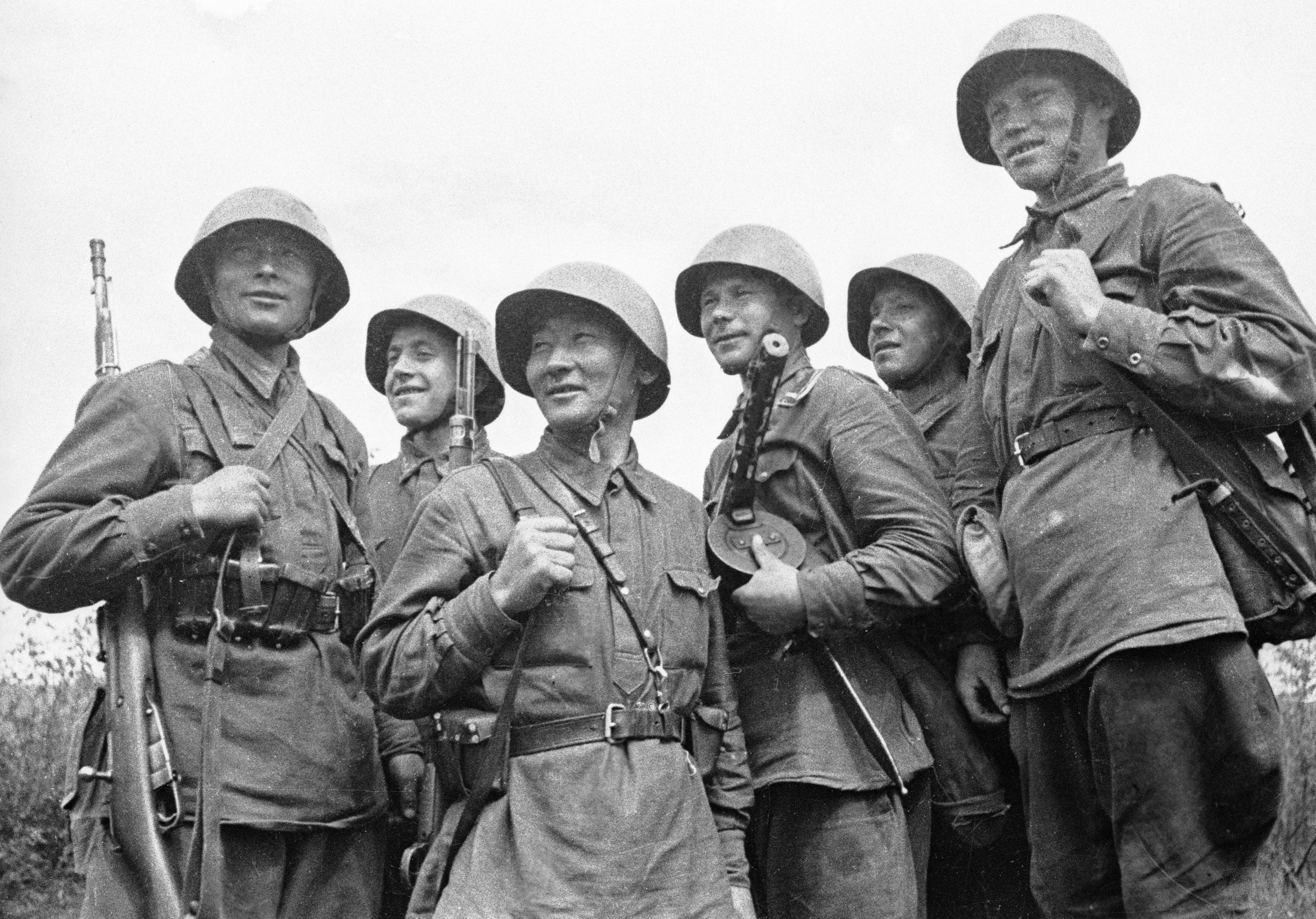
Soviet soldiers prior to the Battle of Smolensk in 1941

In the early 1930s, the Soviet Union developed one-piece coveralls and two-piece suits with a disruptive pattern of big amoeba-like spots, which, in conjunction with the baggy shape of the suit itself, were very effective in breaking the outline of the human silhouette. The two-piece suits were made to be worn over the uniform and gear, which could be accessed through the special slots (a design feature later employed by the Germans). The limited use of a two-colour disruptive "amoeba" pattern began in 1938. The "amoeba" remained in use until the 1950s.

The Soviet Union issued all-white winter camouflage in 1938. During World War II, other designs were tried, including "leaf" (1940) and the jagged three-colour "TTsMKK" (1944). Most troops remained in a monochrome brown.

Post-war Soviet camouflage remained a sign of elite units. A two-colour "sun-ray" pattern was used by paratroopers from 1969 and two- or three-colour versions were issued to Spetsnaz, KGB and MVD troops into the 1980s. The KLMK pattern was the first "digital" camouflage and it was issued to Spetsnaz troops and some Border guards units.

In the early 1980s a new brown and green pattern was introduced, the 3-TsV series, more commonly referred to as TTsKO. It was intended for the Soviet airborne and land forces, and remained in service until after the end of the Soviet Union. It was not seen by the west until 1985 during a military parade.

==== Modern Russia era ====
After the collapse of the Soviet Union, a new pattern was developed as the standard field uniform of the new Russian Armed Forces. Issued from 1993, the three-colour green-brown-tan design in a vertical orientation was called VSR, or "Schofield" in the West. This was quickly superseded by the same basic pattern in a horizontal orientation, called 'flora', in 1998. Other widely used patterns in the 1990s were inspired by Western designs, notably the British DPM influenced the 'Smog' pattern, and U.S. Woodland pattern influenced the 'les' pattern. The elite forces maintain different patterns; MVD troops began using the four-colour "SMK" pattern in 1992 and other units wear a distinctive "reed" pattern. Versions of the "woodland" pattern also remain in use.

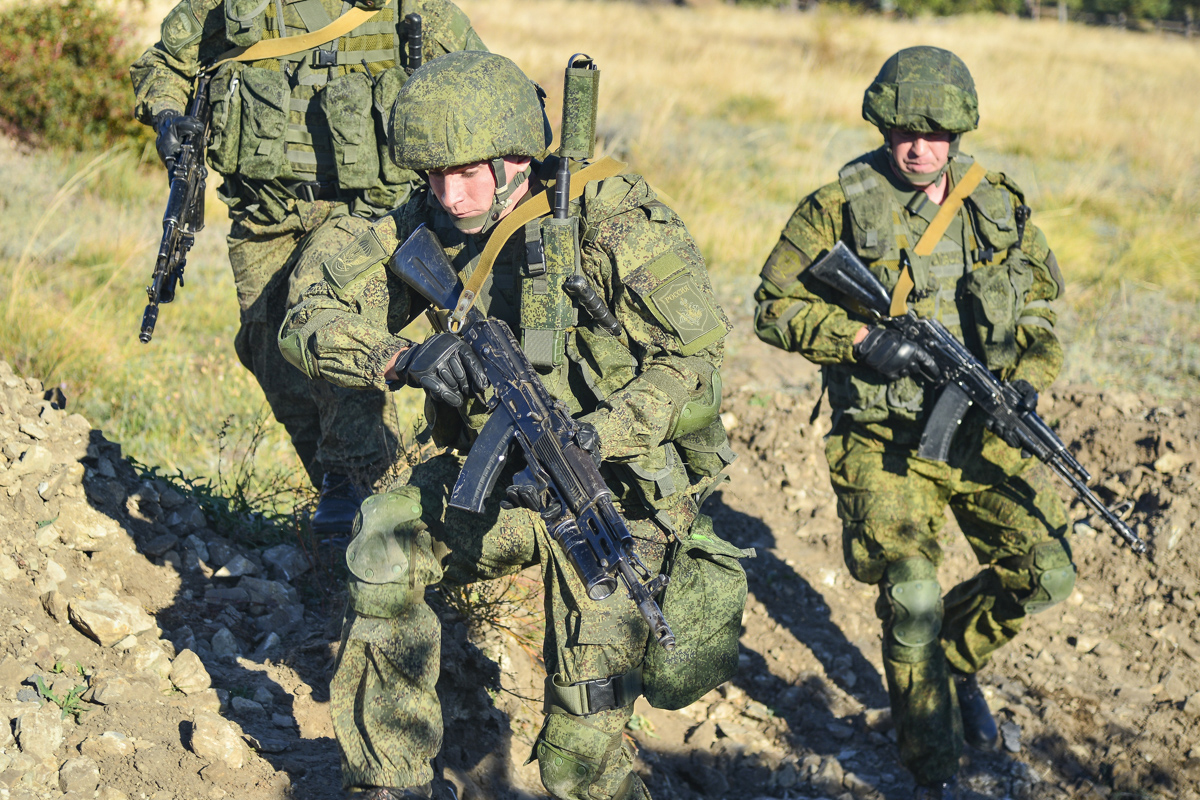
Members of the Russian Airborne Forces in EMR Pattern uniform.

In 2008, the Russian Armed Forces introduced a pixelated camouflage design intended to replace the VSR and Flora patterns. Officially called единая маскировочная расцветка (Edinaya maskirovochnaya rascvetka) or EMR, translating roughly as Unified Camouflage Coloration (in this sense the word "unified" refers to the fact that it is common to all the armed forces of Russia). The pattern is often referred to as Tsifra, Tetris or "digital flora." Several variations of this pattern have been produced, the most common of which is the leto (summer) variant incorporating tiny pixels of black, reddish-brown and foliage green on a pale green background. Other versions include sever (northern regions), zima (winter), and gorod (urban). Full-scale adoption began in 2011.

=== United Kingdom ===
From the late 17th century to the late 19th century, most British soldiers (red coats) fought in scarlet tunics. The adoption of scarlet was mainly for economic reasons. When Oliver Cromwell initially started forming the New Model Army, red was the cheapest dye available. Toward the end of the 19th century, however, as the nature of warfare moved away from close formation fighting to more individual fighting, it began to be recognised that this colour stood out too much.

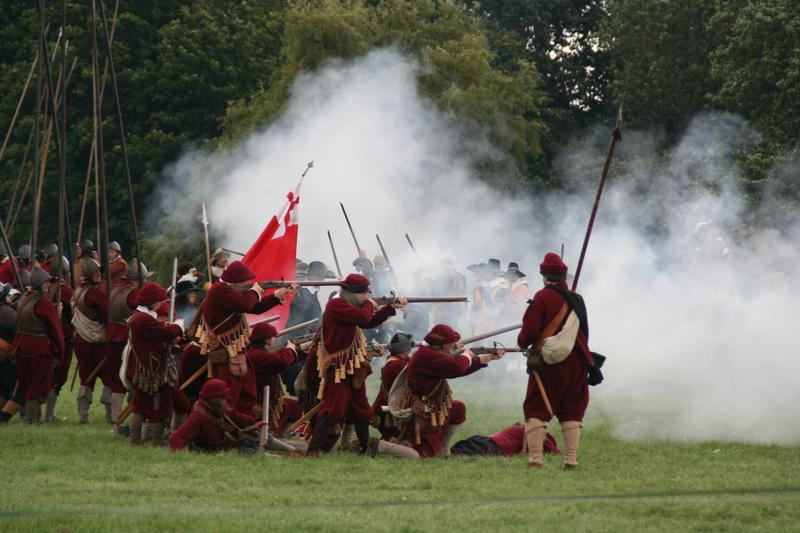
Historical reenactors depicting the New Model Army during the Battle of Naseby. Most British soldiers fought in red-coloured coats/tunics from the 17th to 19th century.

The move towards camouflage began in India, and khaki was used during the Indian rebellion of 1857. It became standard in India in 1885, for all foreign postings in 1896, and was adopted throughout the British Army in 1902 during the Second Boer War.

World War I

In 1902, the British Army introduced a khaki serge uniform known as Service Dress, featuring a pair of straight leg trousers and a jacket, featuring a stand-and-fall collar and four pockets, each secured by a single, usually brass, button. This was subtly altered in 1907, 1914 as well as during the inter-war period. In addition, a version existed for wear with sporrans, was cut away at the front. A separate version was used by officers, which had an open collar and was worn with a shirt and tie. Service Dress continued to be worn throughout the inter-war period and into the earlier part of the Second World War, when it was superseded by Battledress.

==== World War II ====
Battledress (BD), later called "No.5 Dress", was the official name for the standard working and fighting uniform worn by the British Army and the armies of other Imperial and Commonwealth countries in temperate climes from 1937 to the late 1960s. It was a pair of trousers and a close fitting short jacket Blouse made of khaki-coloured woollen cloth. Air force blue battledress was worn by the Royal Air Force, and Royal Navy shore parties wore a navy blue version. Camouflage dress was hand-painted for some specialists.

The Battle Dress design at the start of the war was the (19)37 Pattern. In 1942 it was replaced with the simpler made (19)40 Utility Pattern. This omitted finer details such as pleating on pockets. In both cases the blouse came in two forms, the ordinary ranks with closed neck and the officers open neck which exposed their shirt and tie. From 1942, the camouflaged Denison smock, originally issued to the Airborne forces to be worn over the BD, was issued more widely.

===== Tropical uniforms =====
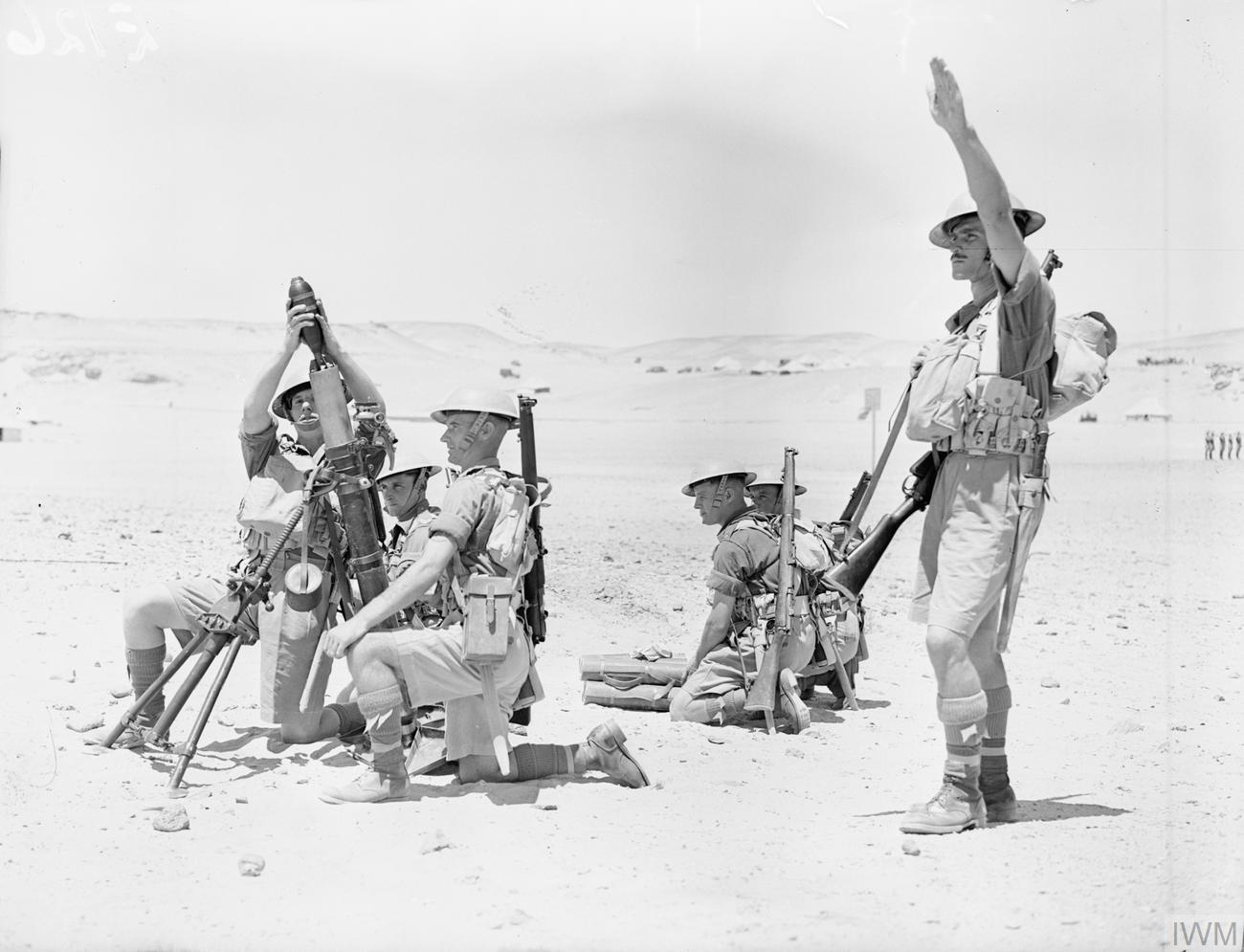
British Army soldiers in KD uniforms in Egypt, June 1940

An on-leave British soldier in KD uniform in Rome, June 1944

Before the Second World War, the British Army had already adopted lightweight khaki drill (KD) uniforms in territories such as Hong Kong and Mandatory Palestine. By late 1930s, a typical tropical uniform consisted of a short- or long-sleeved Aertex shirt, KD shorts, long socks, and ankle puttees. When the North African campaign began in June 1940, British troops continued to wear these uniforms. Their lighter shade and cotton fabric were better suited to desert conditions compared with darker wooden Battle Dress. Shorts remained very common through the whole campaign and were a familiar part of the British troop's appearance in the desert. However, long trousers and warmer coats were needed in night when temperatures drop considerably in the desert. KD uniforms continued to be used during the Italian campaign from 1943, alongside bush jackets and other types of military clothing. In southern Italy, shorts and lightweight shirts remained common in the warmer conditions, while wooden battledress and greatcoats were worn during the colder time.

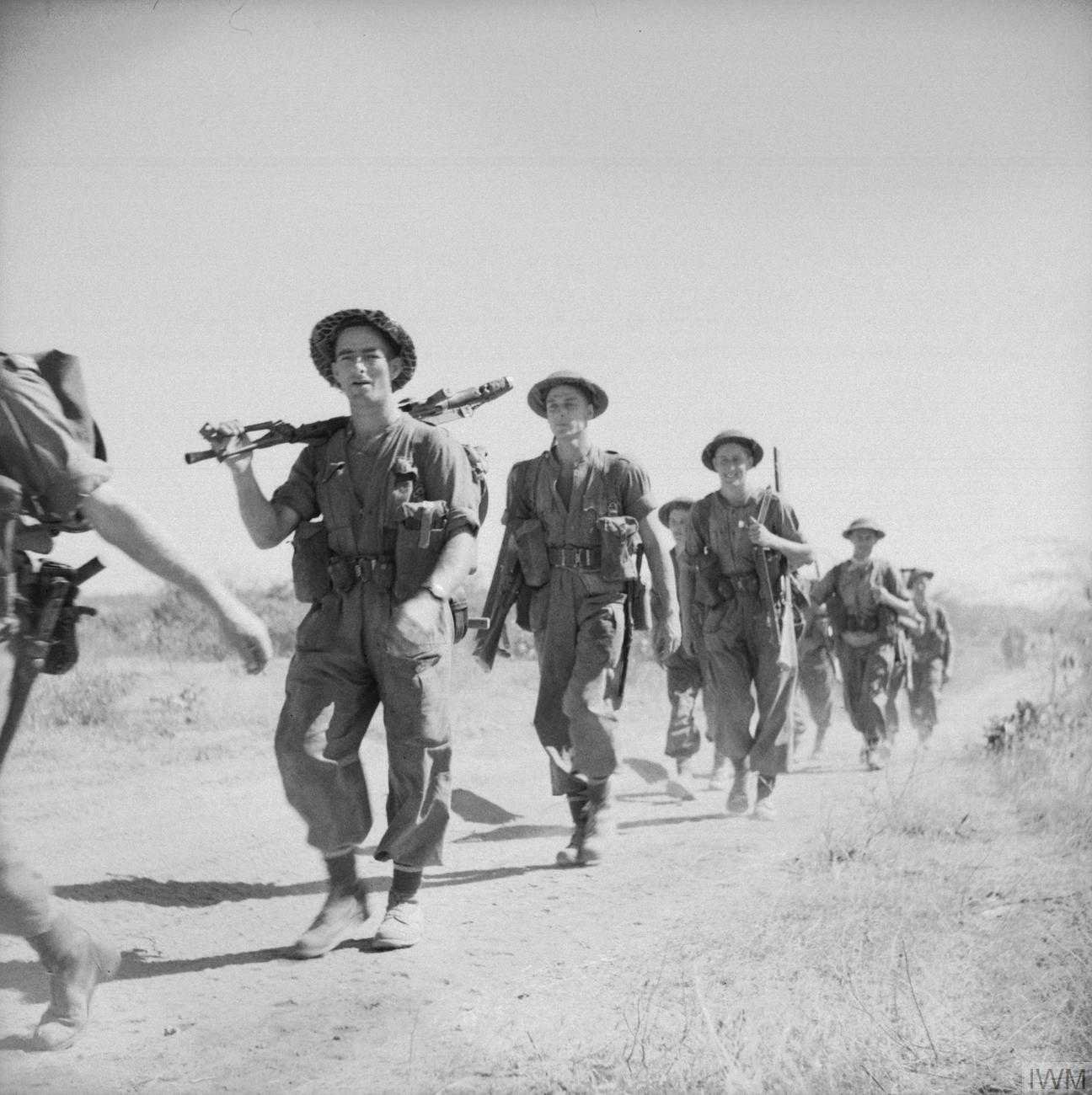
British Army soldiers in Burma, February 1945

In the Far East, the climate was much more humid than that of North Africa. British troops in Malaya also commonly wore lightweight khaki drill uniforms consisting of shorts, long socks. When war with Japan broke out in December 1941, British troops found KD clothing unsuitable for jungle warfare in Malaya and Burma. The light colour provided poor camouflage, and shorts left the skin exposed to thorns, insect bites and an increased risk of infection. Therefore, existing KD clothing was dyed green until more suitable Jungle Green uniforms became available from 1942. A new tropical uniform in Jungle Green (JG) was quickly developed – a JG Aertex battledress blouse, a JG Aertex bush jacket (as an alternative to the blouse) and battledress trousers in JG cotton drill. In the hot and humid conditions of Southeast Asia, JG darkened with sweat almost immediately.

==== Post-war ====
When the war in Europe was over, a new jungle uniform began to be produced for troops posted to the Far East. It was based on the U.S. Army Pacific theatre field uniform, with Aertex being rejected in favour of cotton drill. Although the jacket was similar to the U.S. design, the trousers maintained the battledress design, but with some features copied from American olive drab (OD) herringbone twill trousers. Newly available synthetic materials were utilised in one version of the new Olive Green (OG) uniform, as it was called.

The khaki Battledress was used until the late 1960s, and various uniform items in KD, JG and OG remained on issue to soldiers serving in the Mediterranean, Middle East or tropics after the war. By the end of the 1940s, however, stocks were becoming depleted, and a new 1950-pattern tropical uniform was made available in both KD. Shorts were worn with a bush jacket. Eventually the much more practical Gurkha regiments’ JG shirt was copied, replacing the 1950-pattern bush jacket. All the same, troops still sought out the older, wartime, issues of the better KD, JG and OG kit.

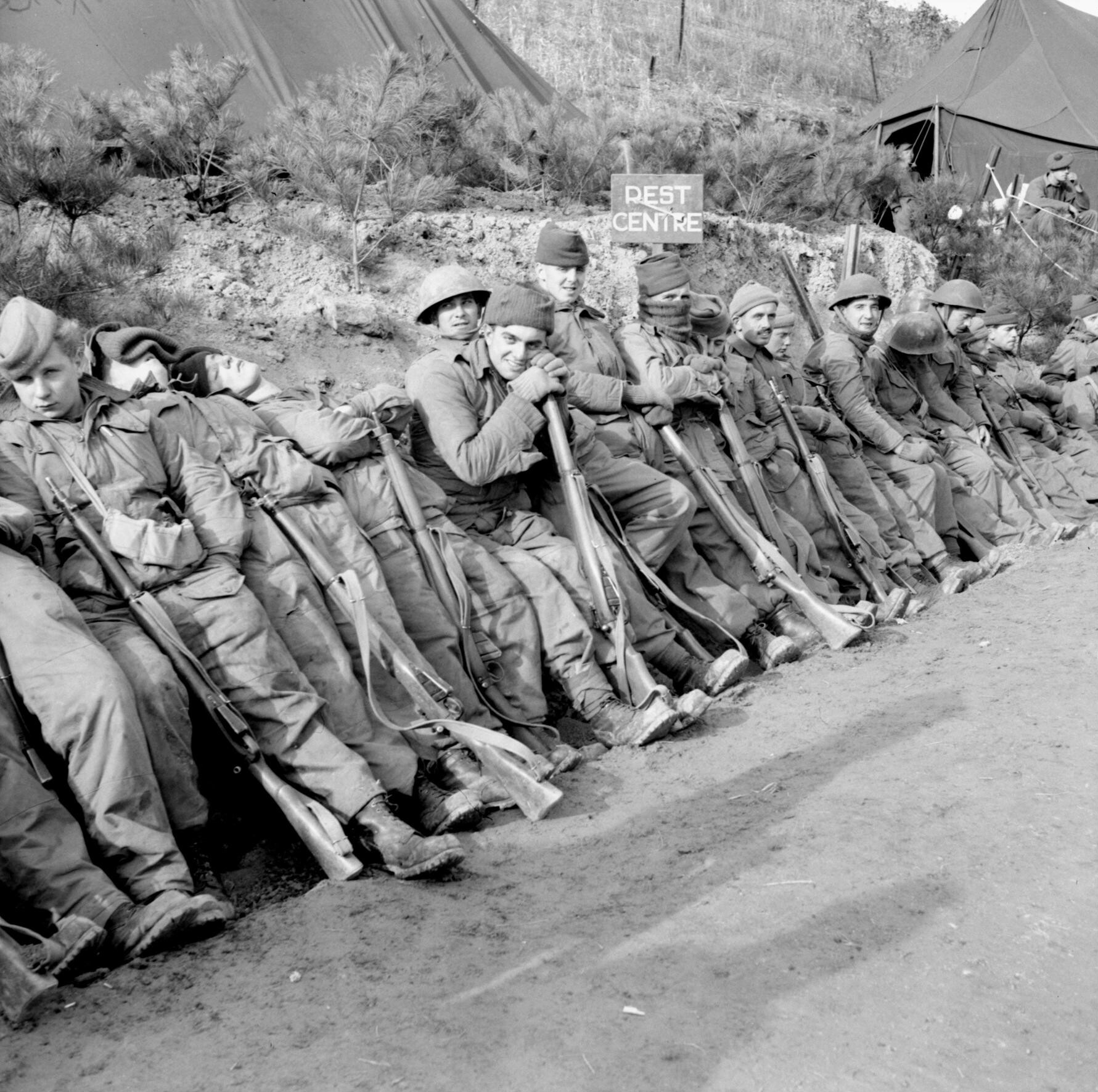
Members of the Black Watch in combat uniforms relaxing during the Korean War

While serving during the Korean War (1950–53), troops had found the existing combat uniform inadequate: It was too hot in the summertime, and not warm enough during the harsh Korean winters. Soldiers were at first issued JG for hot weather, and battledress in the wintertime, but this had to be augmented with additional warm clothing (often from the U.S. Army) as well as caps with ear flaps and fur linings. A solution was rapidly pursued, and towards the end of the Korean War a windproof and water-repellent gabardine combat uniform was issued. The trousers followed the tried and tested battledress design, while the bush jacket had several pockets inside and out, closing with zips and buttons, a hip length skirt with draw-strings to keep out the wind, and a similar arrangement at the waist. The uniform was produced in a greyish green colour (OG), similar to the U.S. Army OD.

With the end of National Service in 1961, the Army looked for a new uniform: Something that was smarter than battledress, but also more comfortable, while still having a military air about it. Using the Korean War combat clothing as a basis, various new items of field wear were developed for the 1960-pattern Combat Dress, which was well made, with a lining above the waist and reinforced elbows. The 1960s was a period of transition for the Army, and this was reflected in the changes that were taking place in soldier's uniform.

Formally classified as "No. 5 Dress", the 1949 pattern battledress began to be withdrawn from British Army use from 1961 on. With the general issue of the new service dress uniform for parade and off-duty ('walking out") wear, battledress was relegated to barracks wear from about 1962 and thereafter disappeared within individual units as stocks were used up. One final appearance was in Northern Ireland as a cold weather dress by the Gloucestershire Regiment in the winter of 1970.

===== DPM =====
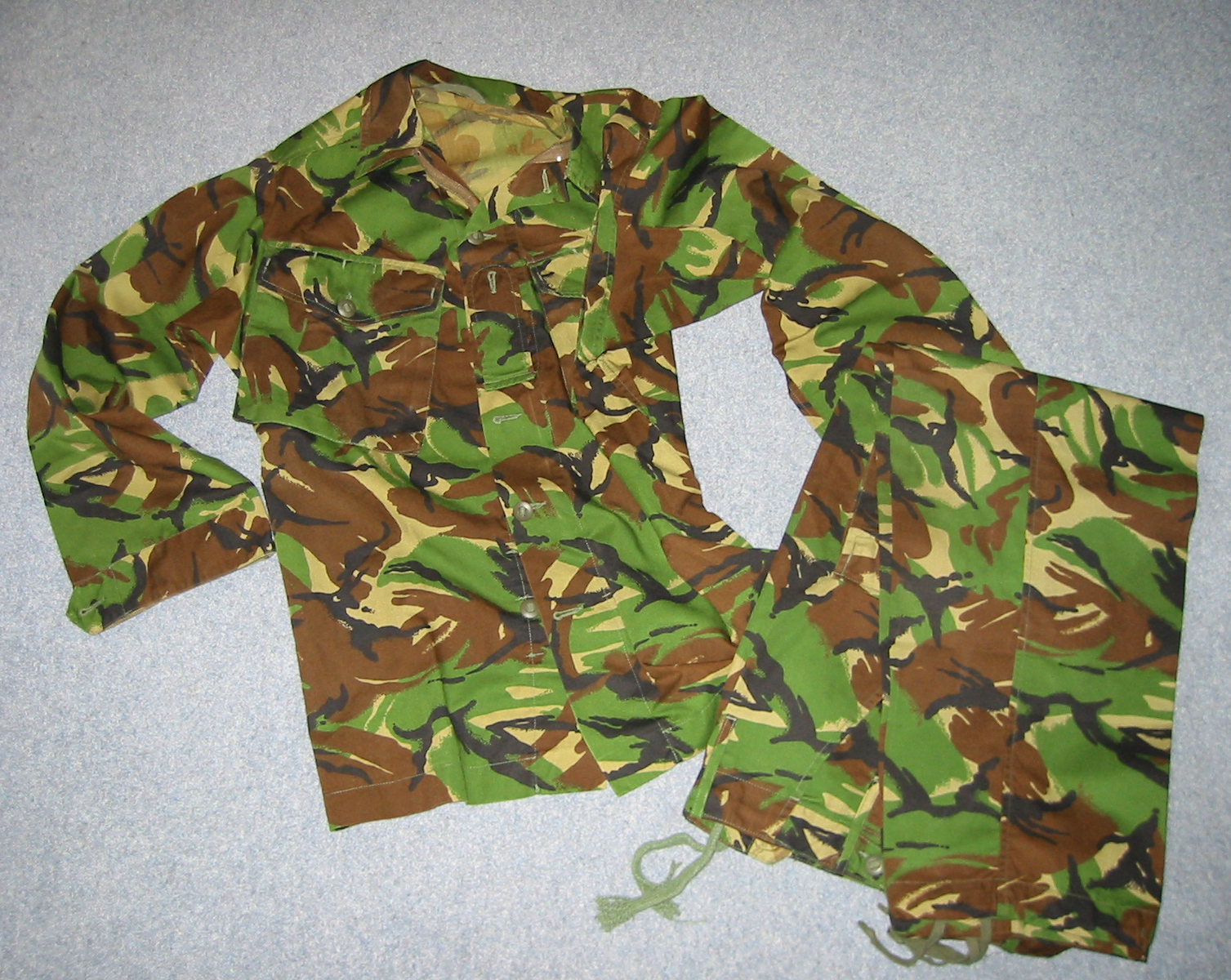
British issue shirt and trousers in temperate version of DPM.

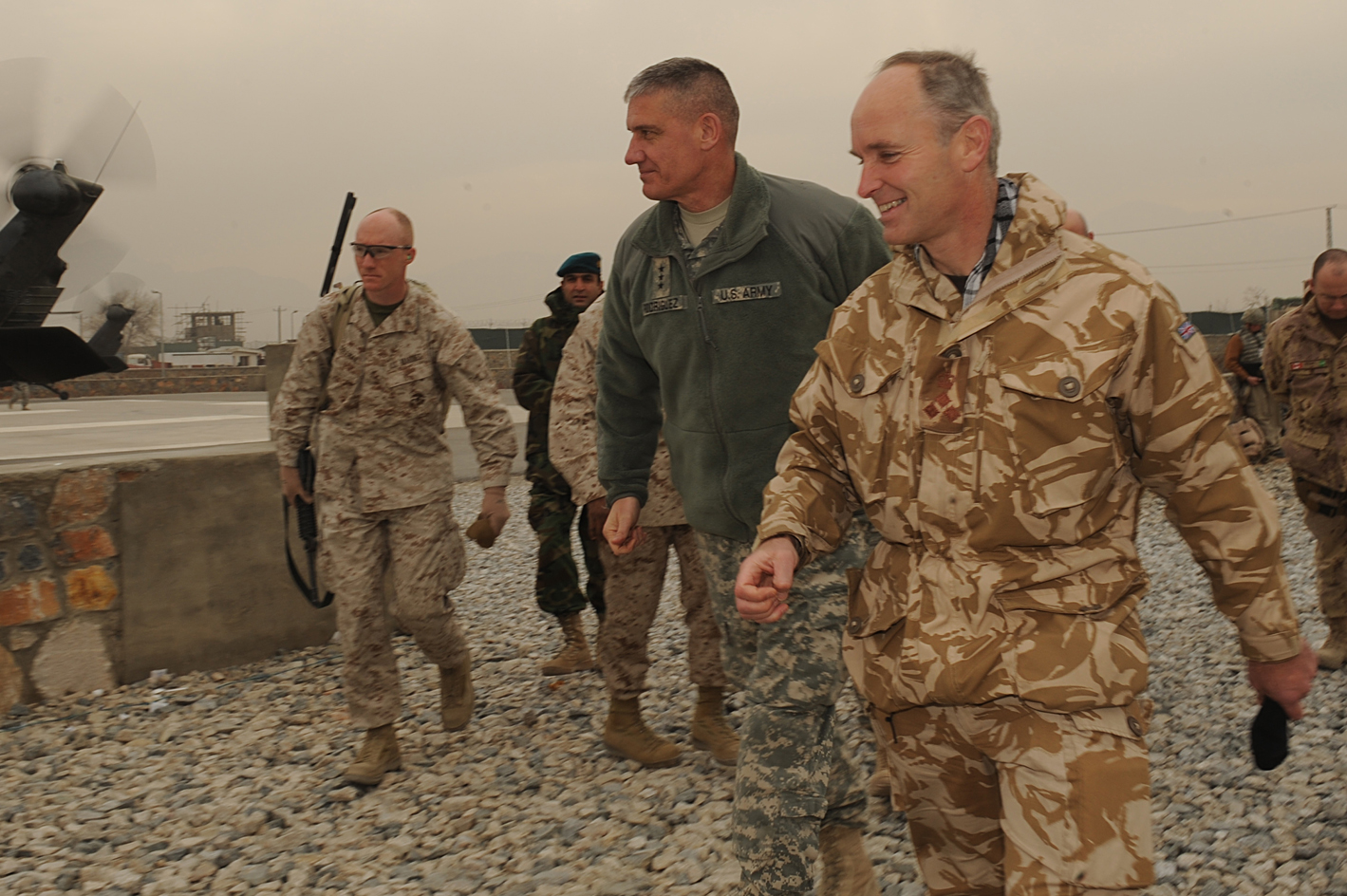
British desert version of DPM worn by a British Army officer, right.

The new, smaller, all-volunteer Army could also now afford to equip every soldier with his own camouflaged uniform, and following work at the Army Personnel Research Establishment (APRE) a four-colour camouflage pattern was designed in 1960. From 1969 it was issued in limited quantities on 1960-pattern jackets and trousers. Known as “1960 Pattern DPM” (Disruptive Pattern Material), these items were soon superseded by the '1968 Pattern, which had a very slightly revised camouflage design on a new uniform, featuring minor changes over the preceding 1960/66-Pattern kit, most notably: a full lining for jacket and trousers. It became official issue only in 1972.

The temperate clothing was followed by a DPM jungle combat uniform which, due to the use of different (i.e. polycotton) material, had a slightly different colourway.

The underlying pattern has remained through various different patterns of clothing but has differed in detail of the pattern and the colourway depending on the material and manufacturer. The DPM uniform was overhauled with the introduction of the Combat Soldier 95 system (CS95) in the mid 90s, which combined lightweight polycotton shirts and trousers similar to the old jungle uniforms with a combat jacket and breathable waterproof clothing.

Prior to the Gulf War, the stock of uniform in four-colour desert DPM of browns and tans had been sold to Iraq therefore a two-colour DPM version (light brown on tan) was issued to UK forces.

===== MultiCam =====
Since 2010 the British armed forces began phasing out DPM in favour of Multi-Terrain Pattern (MTP). This pattern is based on the technology developed by Crye called MultiCam, which was rejected by the US Army in favour of the controversial ACU, but kept elements of the DPM pattern to create a more British Army look. MTP was brought in as a response to the Green Zone in Helmand, Afghanistan, where troops could move between typical desert conditions like those found in Iraq to lush green countryside during a routine patrol. The initial run of MTP was produced in CS95 cut and material, but the second run was produced in the new Personal Clothing System (PCS), closer to that used in the American ACU.

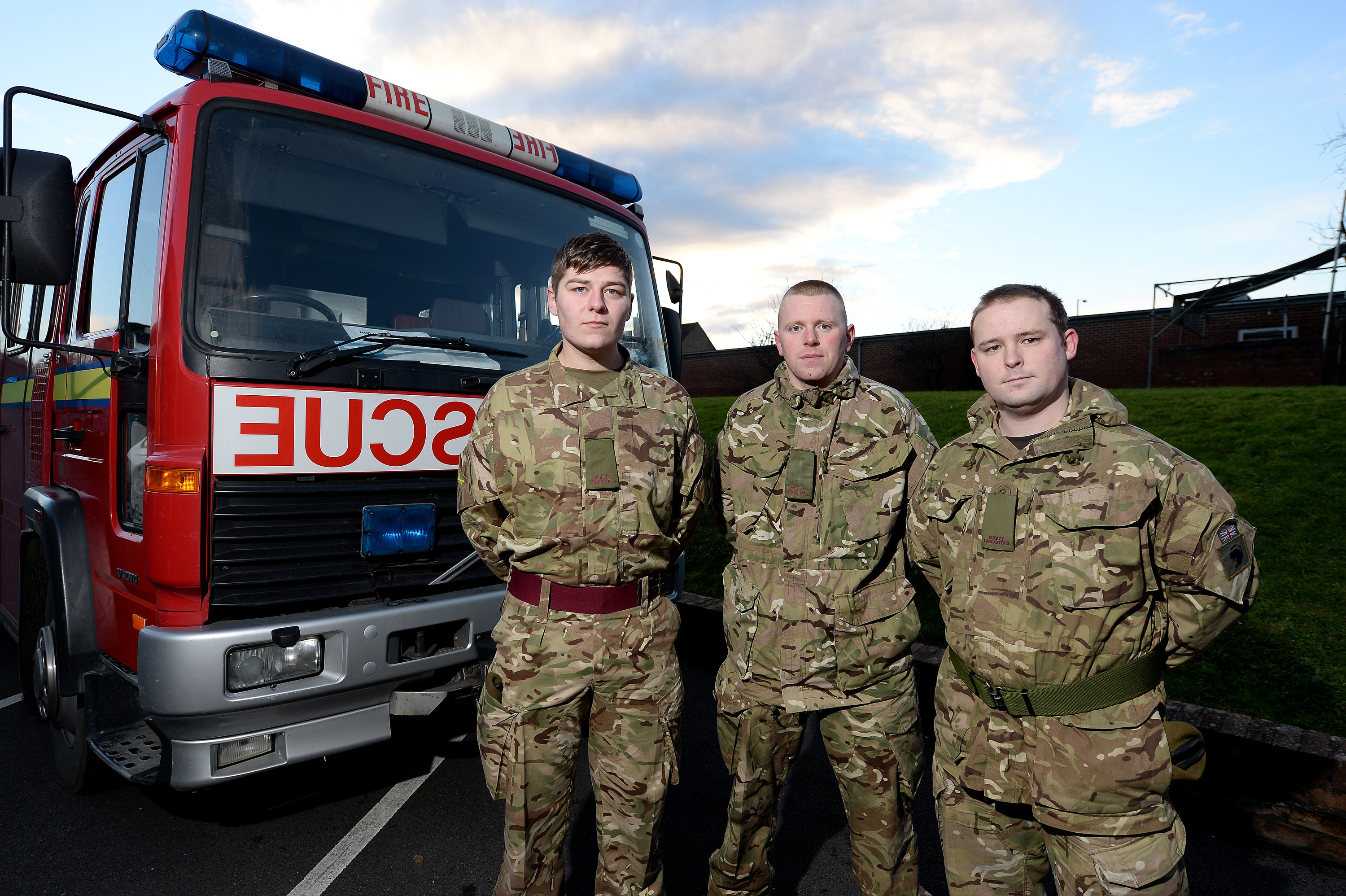
Multi-Terrain Pattern with shirt, left, and with jackets.

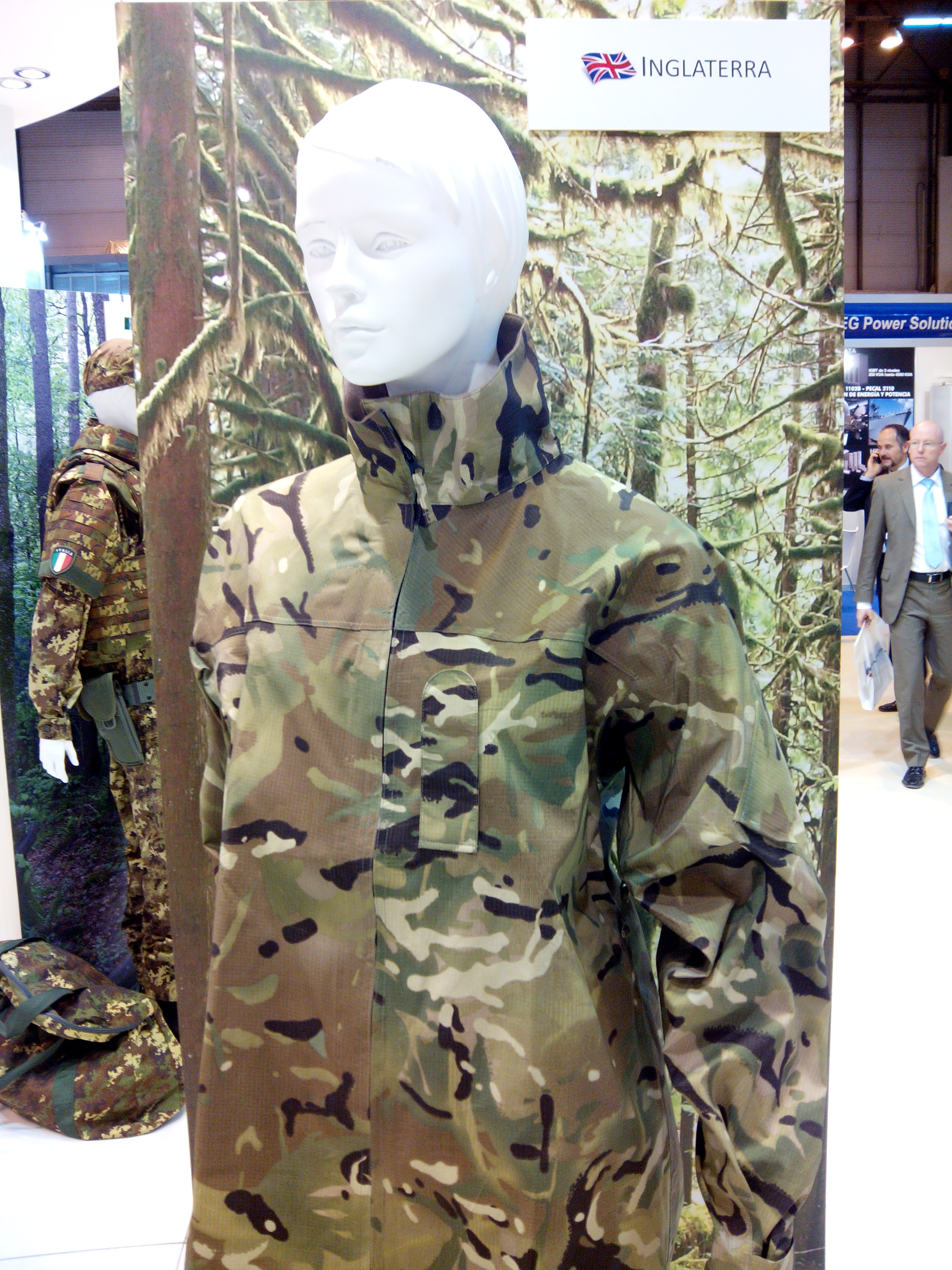
Waterproof jacket in MTP.

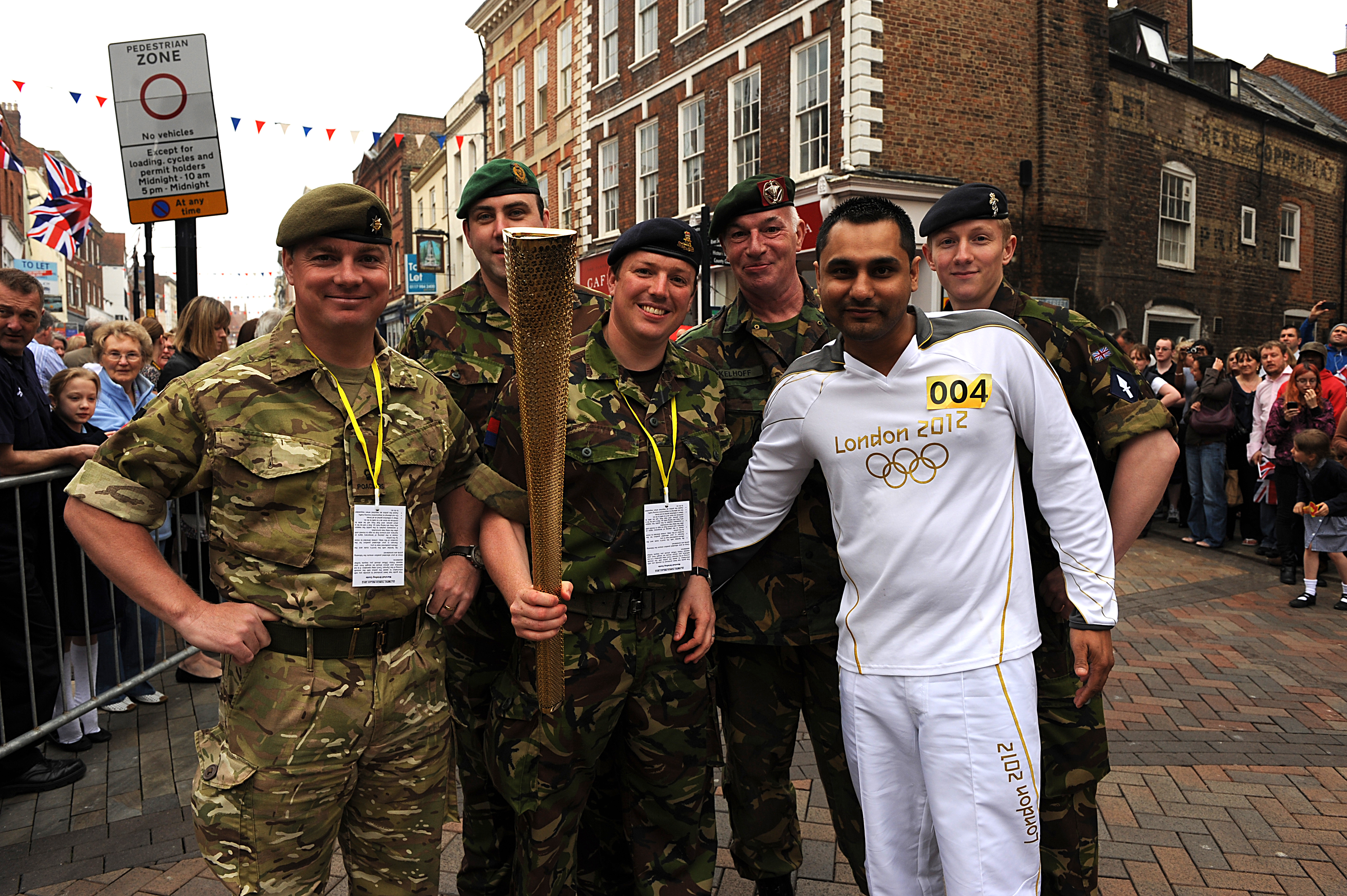
One British soldier wearing a Multi-Terrain Pattern uniform, left, and other soldiers wearing temperate versions of Disruptive Pattern Material uniform.

=== United States ===
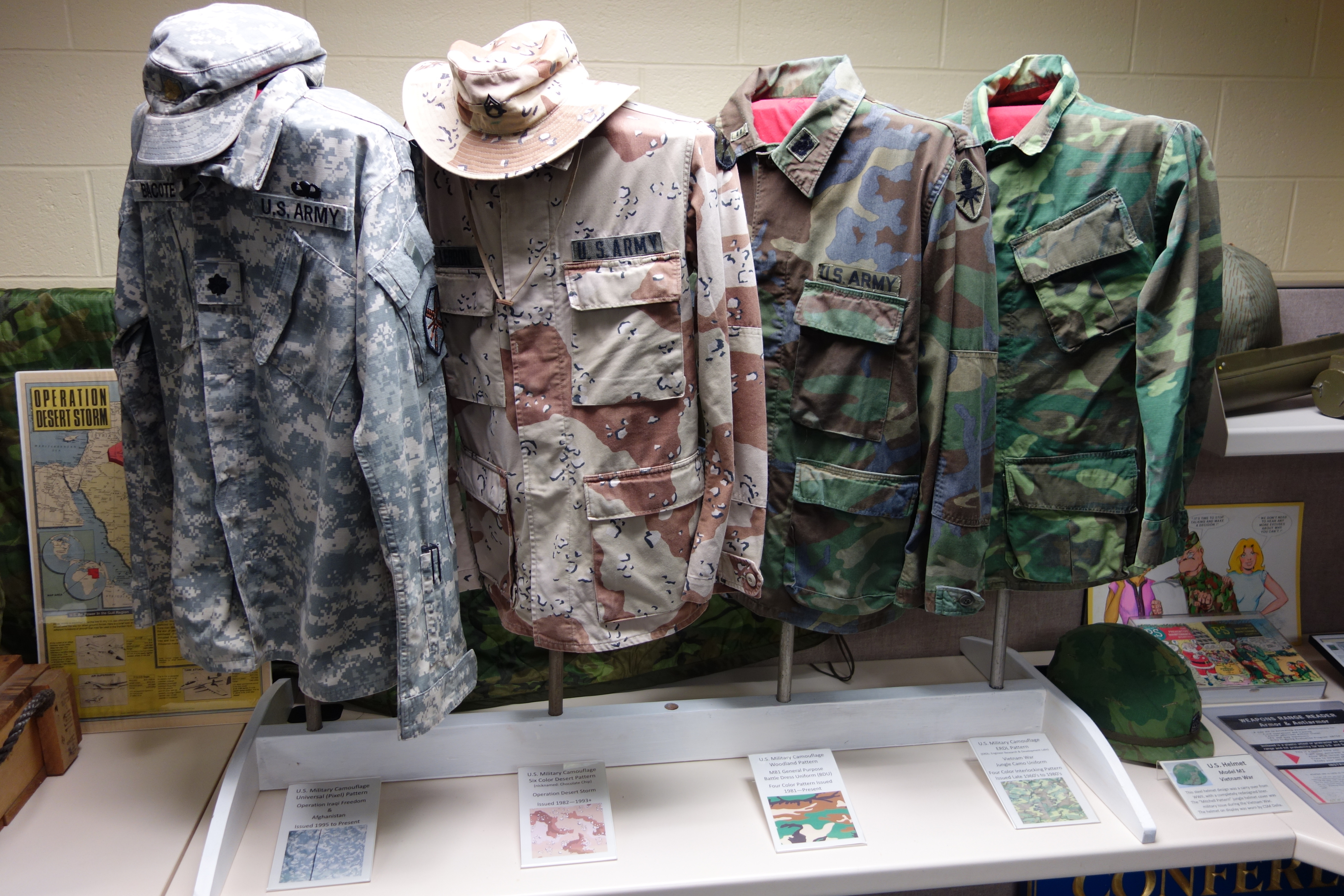
Examples of different US combat uniforms. From left to right are Army Combat Uniform in Universal Camouflage Pattern (UCP), Desert Battle Dress Uniform, Battle Dress Uniform and ERDL pattern

The United States Armed Forces have adopted a variety of combat uniforms throughout their history, including the plain olive green OG-107. In the 1980s the OG-107 was replaced with the camouflaged Battle Dress Uniform (BDU). During that decade the Desert Battle Dress Uniform (DBDU) was introduced and remained until it was replaced in the 1990s by the Desert Camouflage Uniform (DCU).

Pixelated camouflage uniforms were introduced in the 2000s, including Airman Battle Uniform (ABU), Army Combat Uniform, Marine Corps Combat Utility Uniform and the Navy Working Uniform. These replaced the BDU and the DCU.

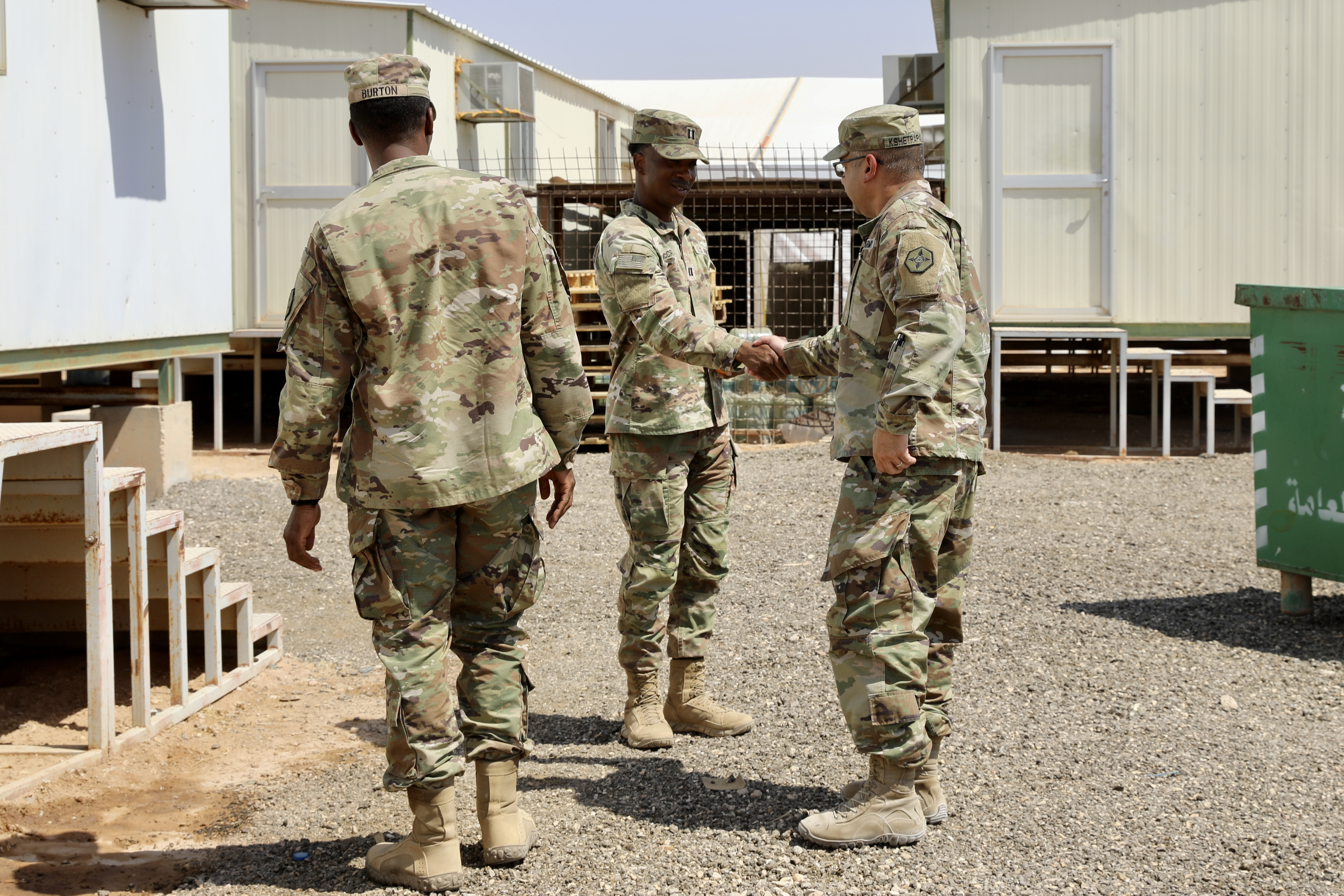
U.S Soldiers oufitted with OCP

The Operational Camouflage Pattern (OCP) uniforms were adopted in 2015 and replaced the Army's UCP uniforms. The OCP uniform also replaced the ABU.

== See also ==
- Military uniform
  - Boonie hat
  - Patrol cap
  - Helmet cover
  - Combat boot
  - Snow camouflage#Military usage
  - Type 07#Combat uniforms and armor
