= List of military clothing camouflage patterns =

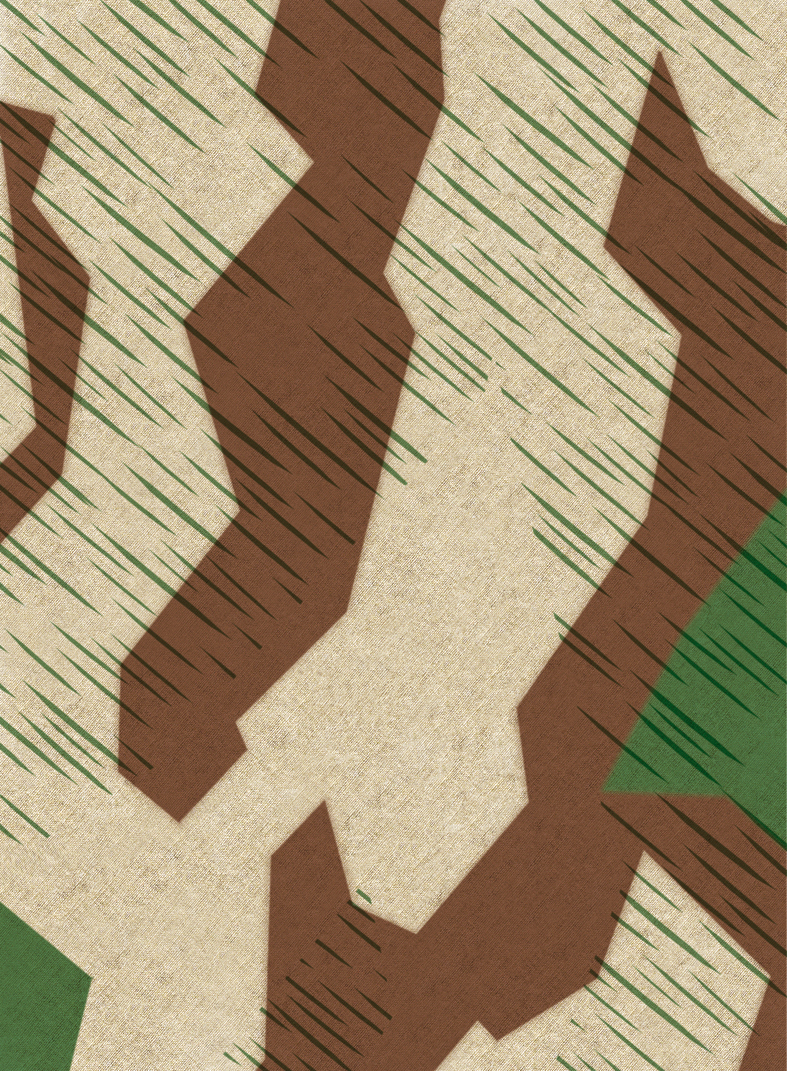
1931 Splittertarnmuster (splinter pattern) first used for tents, then parachutists' jump smocks, and finally for infantry smocks

This is a list of military clothing camouflage patterns used for battledress. Military camouflage is the use of camouflage by armed forces to protect personnel and equipment from observation by enemy forces. Textile patterns for uniforms have multiple functions, including camouflage, identifying friend from foe, and esprit de corps.

The list is organized by pattern; only patterned textiles are shown. It includes current and past issue patterns, with dates; users may include a wide range of military bodies.

== Patterns ==
| Name | Family | Image | Issued | Users |
|---|---|---|---|---|
| Airman Battle Uniform (ABU) | Digital tigerstripe | | 2008 | Formerly used by the United States Air Force and currently used by its civilian auxiliary, Civil Air Patrol. |
| Alpine Tundra Pattern | Woodland | | 2004 | Snow camouflage of the French Armed Forces. It is typically worn by the Alpine Hunters of the 27th Mountain Infantry Brigade and other mountain units. It was developed by Terräng - MP-Sec France. The French Armed Forces were looking for a winter camo for their participation to the ISAF in Afghanistan. |
| AOR-1 (NWU Type II) | Digital | | 2010 | United States Navy, certain specialized units only. |
| AOR-2 (NWU Type III) | Digital | | 2010 | United States Navy, specialized units before 2016, fleet-wide after 2016. |
| A-TACS | Woodland | | 2010 | Used by Peruvian marines and the Haitian National Police. Unlicensed copies are used by the National Guard of Russia under the name of "Ataka". "Original Foliage Green (FG)" variant shown. |
| Australian Multicam | Disruptive Pattern Camouflage | | 2014 | Australia |
| Bundeswehr Tropentarn (3-Farb-Tarndruck) | Flecktarn | | 1993 | German Bundeswehr: tropical battle dress uniform for desert and semi-arid regions (army and air force) was also in use in the Danish army until they changed to M/01 |
| CADPAT TW | Digital | | 1997 | Canada; Temperate woodland variant of the Canadian Disruptive Pattern camouflage. Replaced by CADPAT MT in the 2020s. |
| CADPAT AR | Digital | | 2002 | Canada; Arid region variant of the Canadian Disruptive Pattern camouflage. Replaced by CADPAT MT in the 2020s. |
| CADPAT WO | Digital | | | Canada; Winter operations variant of the Canadian Disruptive Pattern camouflage. |
| CADPAT MT | Digital | | 2021 | Canada; Multi-terrain variant of the Canadian Disruptive Pattern camouflage. |
| Camouflage Central-Europe | Woodland | | 1994 | French Armed Forces and Turkish Armed Forces. |
| Camouflage Pattern No. 4 | Digital Semi-MARPAT | | 2009 | Singapore Armed Forces |
| Digital Camouflage Combat Uniform (DCCU) | Digital | | 2011 | Taiwanese Army and Air Force |
| Desert Camouflage Pattern (three-color) | Woodland | | 1991 | Thailand (VDC), Egypt, United States |
| Desert Camouflage Pattern (six-color) | Woodland | | 1980s | United States (formerly). United Arab Emirates (formerly). Used by many other armies in many colour and pattern variations, including Argentina, Dominican Republic, El Salvador, Kuwait, Niger, Paraguay, Peru, China, Eritrea, Iran, Iraq, Jordan, Kazakhstan, Libya, Pakistan, Philippines, Rwanda, Saudi Arabia, Somalia, South Korea (formerly), Spain (only in arid theaters) (formerly), Yemen. |
| Desert Night Camouflage | ? | | 1991 c. | United States (formerly) |
| Disruptive Pattern Camouflage | Frog Skin | | 1986–2017 | Australian Defence Force |
| Disruptive Pattern Material | DPM | | 1968 | United Kingdom, DPM-95 shown. It replaced similar 1960 pattern DPM, introduced in 1968. Replaced by Multi-Terrain Pattern. Indonesia, Netherlands, New Zealand, Norway (special forces) (formerly), Philippines, Russia, Yemen. |
| Darah Mengalir | DPM | | 1964 | Indonesia and Cambodia; Kopassus and Special Forces Command (Cambodia) |
| EMR Camouflage | Digital | | 2011 | Russia |
| Erbsenmuster | Flecktarn | | 1944 | Germany |
| Erbsentarnmuster | Flecktarn | The Austrian Erbsentarnmuster | 1957 - 1978 | Austrian Armed Forces |
| ERDL (M1948) | Woodland | | 1967–1988 | Singapore Armed Forces, Turkish Armed Forces late 1980s–1990s, was used by the USMC until the early 1980s and the U.S. Air Force until the late 1980s. |
| Flächentarnmuster, also called Kartoffelmuster (potato pattern), or Blumentarn (flower camouflage) | Flecktarn | | 1956–1967 | East German National People's Army |
| Flecktarn | Flecktarn | | 1990 | Germany, and at least 16 variants in different countries. Albania; Belgium; China until 2007; Denmark 3-color variant; France; India; Japan; Kyrgyzstan; Poland; Russia; Greece, Ukraine. |
| Frog Skin/Spot | Frog Skin | | 1942 | United States. Reversible: 5-color jungle one side, 3-color beach the other. Also sometimes called "Duckhunter." Used by the US, (primarily the USMC) in World War II. Remained in use by the USMC into the 1960s. Also used by Turkey until 1980s in different colorways. |
| Granite B | Digital | | 2011–present | South Korea |
| Hungarian camouflage pattern 2015M | Woodland | | 2015 | Used by the Hungarian Defence Force introduced in 2015. |
| HyperStealth Spec4ce Afghan Forest | Woodland | | 2009 | Used by the Afghan National Army since 2010. |
| Jigsaw | Puzzle | | 1956 | Belgium |
| Kopaska Camouflage | Digital | | 2006 | Indonesian Navy |
| K17(Type 17) | Modified duck hunter pattern | | 2017/2018 | Vietnam; 5 variant colorways |
| K20 (Type 20) | Woodland | | 2019/2020–present | Vietnam; 6 variant colorways |
| Leibermuster | Woodland | | 1945 | Germany |
| Lizard | Lizard | | 1947 | France; Many variants, both with horizontal stripes (Chad, Gabon, Rwanda, Sudan, Cuba, Congo, Greece) and with vertical stripes (Portugal 1963, then Egypt, Greece, India, Lebanese Palestinians, and Syria). Outside France, Tunisia has probably fielded more varieties of the lizard pattern than any other nation. Vietnam era Tigerstripe is a variant of Lizard. |
| Linud Camouflage | Digital | | 2012 | Indonesian Strategic Reserve |
| M05 | Digital | | 2007 c. | Finland |
| M10 | Digital | | 2011 | Standard camouflage of the Serbian Armed Forces. |
| MM-14 | Digital | | 2014 | Ukrainian Army camouflage used since 2014, replacing the Dubok camo that was developed in 1980 and in service since 1984. Ukraine though now has multiple patterns that it received from NATO and other western partners since the Russian invasion of Ukraine in 2022. Ukraine uses yellow, blue and green markings (usually in a form of a duck tape) on the uniform to prevent friendly fire. |
| M19 Netherlands Fractal Pattern Green (NFP-Green) | Flecktarn | | 2019 | NFP Green, Standard issued camouflage since 2019 in the Royal Netherlands Army . This camouflage is designed to be used in green areas, woods, and urban areas in Europe. Three additional colour variations are in use and are shown below. An arctic version of the NFP is being considered. |
| M19 NFP-Multitone | Flecktarn | | 2019 | NFP Multitone is in use in the Royal Netherlands Army. It is used for packs and load carriage equipment. The fabric being coarser, it is difficult to incorporate all the details. I uses therefore less colours than the Tan and the Green, and takes mixes both so that they can use it in both environments efficiently enough. |
| M19 NFP-Navy | Flecktarn | | 2020 | In use in the Royal Dutch Navy since 2020, and used by the Belgian Navy since 2021 |
| M19 NFP-Tan | Flecktarn | | 2019 | Camouflage in use in the Royal Netherlands Army in desert and arid climates. |
| M20 WoodLatPat | Splinter | — | 2020 | The Latvian Land Forces unveiled a new standard camouflage pattern. It uses a similar concept to the Swedish M90 Splinter camo, but with smaller shapes. |
| M84 | Flecktarn | | 1984 | Denmark; 9 color variants. France; Latvia; Lithuania; Russia; Sweden; Turkey; Was used by Estonian Defence Forces until 2006, when it was replaced with ESTDCU |
| M90F | Splinter | | 1989 | Standard camouflage of the Swedish armed forces. The Latvian Land Forces used it in 1996 for the SFOR mission, the uniforms were surplus equipment of the Swedish Army. Two additional colour patterns exist and described below. |
| M90K | Splinter | | 2004 | Introduced for the Afghan mission of the Swedish armed forces, colours of the standard M90F were changed for an arid environment. |
| M90 Winter | Splinter | | — | Used by Sweden and by the Royal Netherlands Army special force group Korps Commandotroepen (KCT) |
| M2017 | Woodland | | 2017 | Introduced for the Romanian Armed Forces in 2017. Has three variants: Army, Navy, and Air Force. Similar to MultiCam. |
| Marina Trans Jungle (US4CES) | Digital | — | 2015 | Mexican Naval Infantry |
| Marine Pattern (MARPAT) | Digital | | 2002 | United States Marine Corps (arid variant shown), some U.S. Navy sailors assigned to USMC units, and U.S. Marine Corps JROTC cadets. The temperate variant was used by the Georgian Army in the late 2000s, but has since been replaced by a domestic variant of MultiCam. |
| MultiCam | Woodland | | 2002 | U.S. Armed Forces, Angola, Brazil, Australia, Austrian Armed Forces Jagdkommando, Cypriot National Guard, Denmark, Montenegro, New Zealand, Panama, South Korea, Thailand, Indonesia, Bolivia, Tunisia, Turkish Navy Azerbaijani Armed Forces, the Canadian Special Operations Forces Command, Georgian Armed Forces, and the Haitian National Police. Also known as Scorpion. Norwegian Special Forces (FSK, MJK) |
| Multi-Environment Pattern | Woodland | | 2024 | French Army, the BME (Bariolage Multi-Environnement) will replace the Central Europe Pattern and the Daguet Desert Pattern from 2024. The pattern was designed by the Technical Section of the Army. The base colour is the one used on all new French vehicles, "Brown French Soil" (Brun Terre de France). |
| Multi-Environment Winter Pattern | Woodland | — | 2024 | French Army, it will replace the Alpine Tundra Pattern from 2024. This pattern is used by the "Alpine Rangers" (Chasseurs Alpins). It uses the same pattern as the BME but with a white background, light gray spots, and small patches made of a darker colour based on a humid trunk. |
| Multitarn | Flecktarn | | 2016 | In 2016, the Bundeswehr Research Institute for Materials and Operating Materials (WIWeB) developed a universal camouflage following the lead of many allies in their purchase of the MultiCam camo for their special forces, and its 6 colours are very close to it. It was developed as the new standard pattern for the Bundeswehr but has yet only entered service with the special forces. |
| Multi-Terrain Pattern | Disruptive Pattern Material | | 2010 | British Armed Forces, it is a combination of the Army's previous camouflage, DPM and MultiCam. It is supposedly more effective than MultiCam itself, due to the integration of more natural and fluid shapes of the DPM pattern. |
| M06 ESTDCU | Digital | | 2006 | Estonian Defence Forces |
| M/98 Woodland | Woodland | | 1998–Present | Norway |
| Multiumfeld-Tarnmuster 16. | Woodland | | 2022 | Switzerland This camouflage will be the standard one for the new personal equipment of the Swiss Army (MBAS armament program). The pattern is based on the TAZ 90, and the black colour was replaced by a light brown, and is also designed to provide multispectral stealth properties (IR and radar). |
| MOUT T-pattern | ? | | 1990s | United States Marine Corps developed the experimental T-pattern or T-block pattern for Operation Urban Warrior. |
| NWU Type I | Digital | | 2008–2019 | United States Navy, New York State Naval Militia, and U.S. Naval Sea Cadet Corps. Retired by the U.S. Navy in 2019. |
| Operational Camouflage Pattern (OCP) | Woodland | | 2015 | United States, replacing Universal Camouflage Pattern by 2019. An enlarged, slightly modified version of MultiCam. Also known as Scorpion W2. |
| PHILARPAT | Digital | | 2016 | Philippine Army. |
| PHILMARPAT | Digital | | 2008 | Philippine Marine Corps |
| Platanenmuster | Flecktarn | | 1937 | Germany: summer (shown) and autumn variants. |
| Rain pattern | Rain | | 1960 c. | Warsaw Pact countries: Poland ("deszczyk"), Czechoslovakia ("jehličí"), East Germany ("Strichtarn"), and Bulgaria subsequent use: Uzbekistan, Kazakhstan |
| Rhodesian Brushstroke | Brushstroke | | 1965–1980 | Rhodesia/Zimbabwe |
| Semi pixelated Arid Desert pattern | semi-Digital | | 2012 | Pakistan Army |
| Soldier 2000 | Woodland | | 1994 | South Africa |
| Splittermuster | Splinter | | 1931 | Germany 1931–1945 (Wehrmacht, SS, Reichswehr) |
| Tactical Assault Camouflage (TACAM) | Organic, non-pixelated pattern | | 2004 | U.S. National Counterterrorism Center |
| TNI PRIMA camouflage | Digital | | 2025–present | Indonesia. Previously named as Sage Green camouflage pattern (Three-dimensional camo pattern) |
| Type II camouflage | Flecktarn | | 1991 | JGSDF, JMSDF, Japan National Defense Academy cadets, JASDF Air Rescue Wings Pararescuemen |
| Type III camouflage | Flecktarn | | 2007 | JGSDF, JMSDF, JASDF |
| Tarnanzug ÖBH | Organic, non-pixelated pattern | Tarnanzug ÖBH | 2017 | Austrian Armed Forces |
| Tarnanzug Beige ÖBH | Woodland | Tarnanzug ÖBH | 2019 | Austrian Armed Forces |
| Tarndruck Beige PXL | Digital pattern | Tarnanzug ÖBH | 2011 | Austrian Armed Forces |
| Tarndruck SEK PXL | Digital pattern | Tarnanzug ÖBH | 2014 | Austrian Armed Forces |
| TAZ 83 | Woodland | Swiss TAZ-83 camouflage | 1983 | Switzerland |
| TAZ 90 | Woodland | | 1990s | Switzerland |
| TAZ 07 | Woodland | | 2007 | Switzerland Only used for missions abroad, such as in arid countries (Mali), it can also be used in missions abroad in summer in countries such as Kosovo (Swisscoy as part of KFOR) or in South Korea (NNSC mission). The pattern is based on the TAZ 90. |
| Telo mimetico | Woodland precursor | | 1929 | Italy, for shelter-halves, then uniforms. Oldest mass-produced camouflage pattern. |
| Tigerstripe | Tigerstripe | | 1969 c. | South Vietnam, US special forces in Vietnam. Based on Lizard. Many variants. Also used by Australia, New Zealand in Vietnam. |
| Turkish M2008 'Nano' | semi-Digital | | 2008 | Turkish Armed Forces, Azerbaijani Armed Forces, Ukrainian Armed Forces, Somali Armed Forces and South Sudan People's Defence Forces. 6 variants, one still in use with Turkish Air Force. |
| Turkish M2018 | semi-Digital | | 2018 | Gendarmerie General Command and Uzbek Armed Forces. |
| Turkish M2019 | semi-Digital | | 2019 | Turkish Naval Forces |
| Turkish M2021 | semi-Digital | | 2021 | Turkish Land Forces, General Directorate of Security and Azerbaijani Armed Forces; 4 variants |
| Type 99 (China) | Woodland | | 1999 | China |
| Type 07 (China) | Digital | | 2007 | China. Ocean variant shown. |
| Universal Camouflage Pattern | Digital | | 2005–2014/19 | United States Army, some U.S. Navy sailors assigned to army units, the Texas State Guard, Chadian Army, and the Azerbaijani Armed Forces. Also used by the Iranian military in limited contexts. |
| U.S. Woodland ("M81") | Woodland | | 1981 | Derived from ERDL. Used by the United States Navy SEALs, U.S. Navy SWCC, USMC MARSOC, Luxembourg, Argentine marines, Azerbaijani Armed Forces, Bangladesh Army, the Dutch Marine Corps, Peruvian marines, and the Nigerian Navy. Was used by the Afghan National Army and the Mexican Naval Infantry in the 2000s. Also used by the Moldovan Special Forces, Malaysian navy, Malawian Army, Tunisian Army's Special Forces Group and Turkey until mid-2000s in 3 colorways. |
| VSR-93 Flora | Woodland | | 1993 | Russia |
| wz. 68 Moro | "Worm pattern" | | 1969–1989 | Polish People's Army; 6 variant colorways. |
| wz. 89 Puma | "Reptile Pattern" | | 1989–1993 | Polish Armed Forces, National Army of Afghanistan. |
| wz. 93 Pantera | Woodland | | 1993 | Polish Armed Forces, Armed Forces of Ukraine, Armed Forces of Armenia. |
| Wavepat | Digital | | 2010 | ROK Marine Corps; Known as 물결무늬 (Wave pattern) - aka WAVEPAT - or 해병 디지털 (Marine digital). |
| Xingkong (camouflage) | Digital | | 2019 | China |

== See also ==
- Military uniform
- Snow camouflage#Military usage
