= United States Army Engineer Research and Development Laboratory =

United States Army research facility (1947–1967)

Engineer Research and Development Laboratory
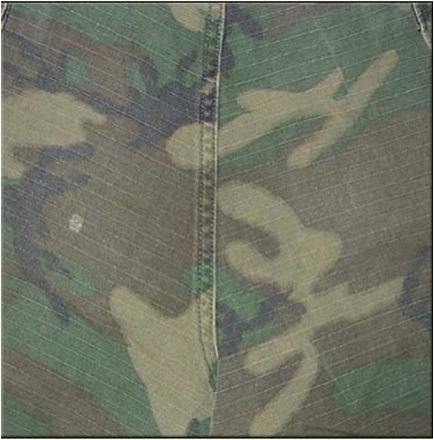
- ERDL (1948) pattern
- Active: 1947–1967
- Country: United States
- Branch: US Army
- Type: Military R&D organization
- Garrison/HQ: Fort Belvoir, Virginia

The Engineer Research and Development Laboratory (ERDL) was a United States Army Corps of Engineers research facility located at Fort Belvoir, Virginia.

The ERDL performed research and development related to earthmoving, industrial engines and turbines, fuels handling, environmental control, electric power and propulsion, direct energy sources, detectors, bridges and marine craft, mine warfare, fortifications and obstacles, camouflage and deception, water purification, nuclear weapons effects, materials, and environmental testing.

== History ==
The Army established its first engineer board at Willets Point, New York, now Fort Totten, in 1870. Around the turn of the century, the engineer board was transferred to Washington Barracks, DC, where it was disbanded in 1920. It was replaced by the Board on Engineer Equipment, which was set up the following year in 1921, at Camp Humphreys, Virginia, now Fort Belvoir. This was the forerunner of the Engineer Board, which guided the research and development activities of the Corps of Engineers from 1933 to 1947. Initially, the Board occupied two temporary buildings near the present Wallace Theater. Its mission continued to expand, however, and the Engineer Board moved into the current facilities in 1942.

The Engineer Board's laboratory elements were re-designated as Engineer Research and Development Laboratories, or ERDL, on 1 March 1947. The change in name was made to clarify the status of the scientists and technicians at the installation. The Engineer Board continued to function as the directive and policy-making body for the ERDL. By 20 October 1947, all functions of the Engineer Board laboratory elements were transferred to ERDL. Additionally, the ERDL was under administrative supervision by the Director of Research and Development of the Engineering Center, operated through the Engineer Board, and technical supervision remained with the Office of the Chief of Engineers (OCE).

The ERDL was released from assignment to OCE and transferred to the newly created US Army Materiel Command (AMC), 1 August 1962. The ERDL was in turn assigned to AMC's US Army Mobility Command (MOCOM). About two years later, ERDL was made subordinate to MOCOM's US Army Mobility Equipment Center (MEC) on 1 July 1964. Previously, the ERDL reported directly to the Commanding General, US Army Mobility Command (CG, MOCOM).

== Army Equipment Development milestones ==
Among other things, the ERDL was responsible for the creation of the ERDLator water treatment device in World War II, the ERDL woodland camouflage pattern in 1948, and the updated M1950 lensatic compass.

The ERDL also established the first US Army research group dedicated to night vision systems in 1954, called the Research and Photometric Section.

== Mobility Equipment Research & Development Center ==
Mobility Equipment Research & Development Center / Command
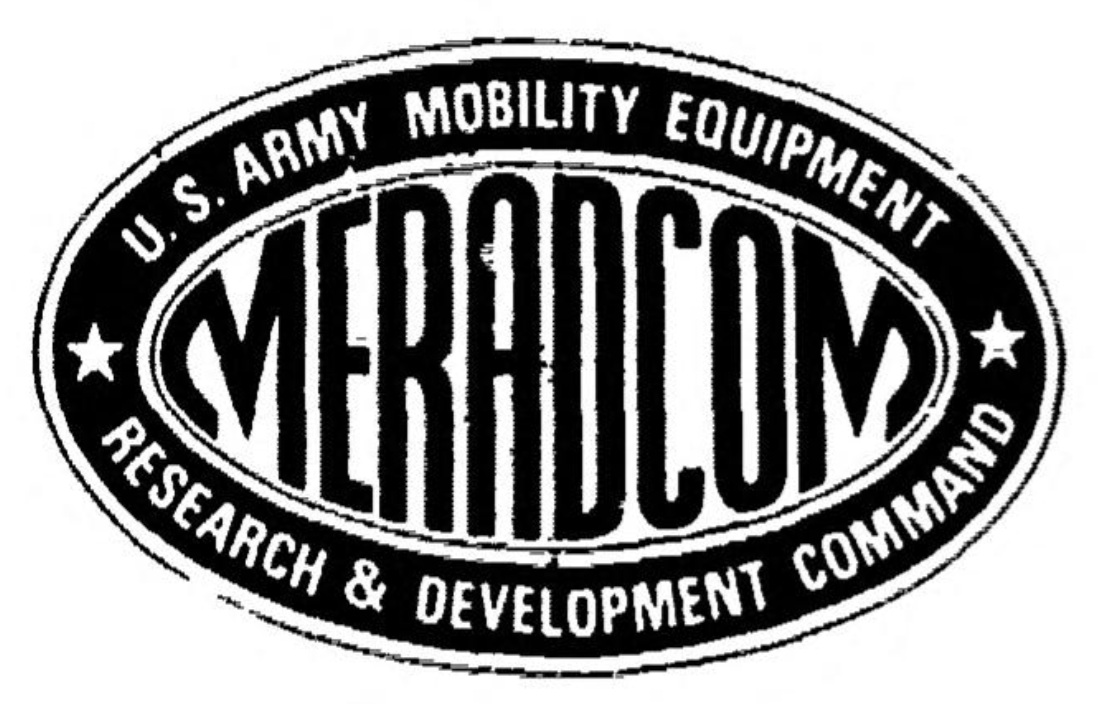
- MERADCOM logo
- Active: 1967–1984
- Country: United States
- Branch: US Army
- Type: Military R&D organization
- Garrison/HQ: Fort Belvoir, Virginia

Insignia
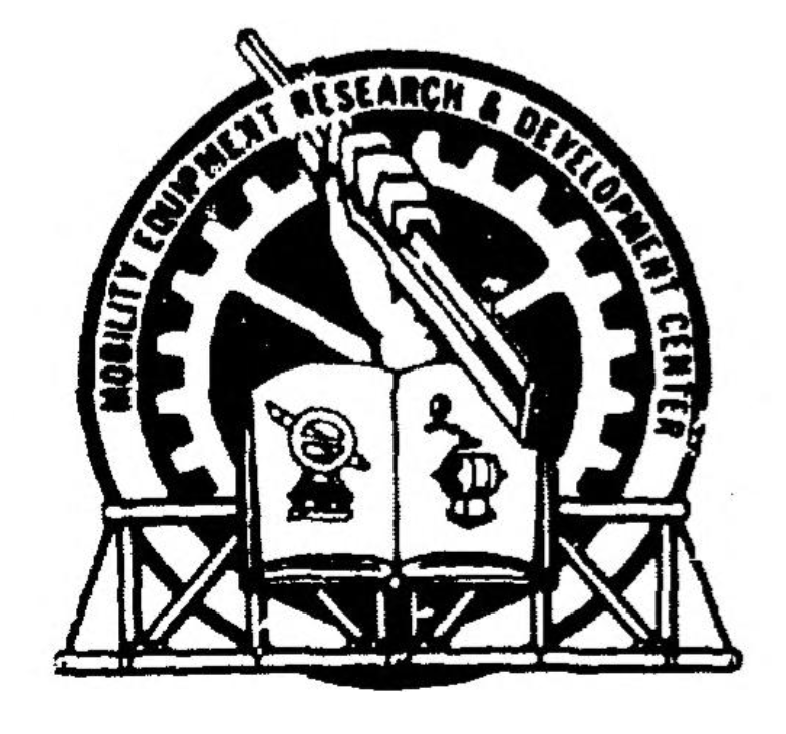
- MERDC logo (1967)

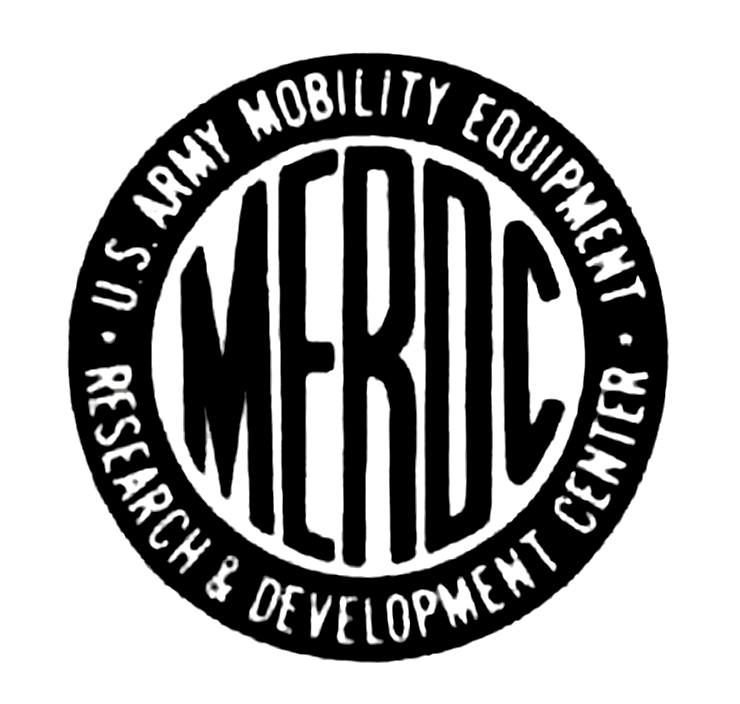
- MERDC logo (1975)

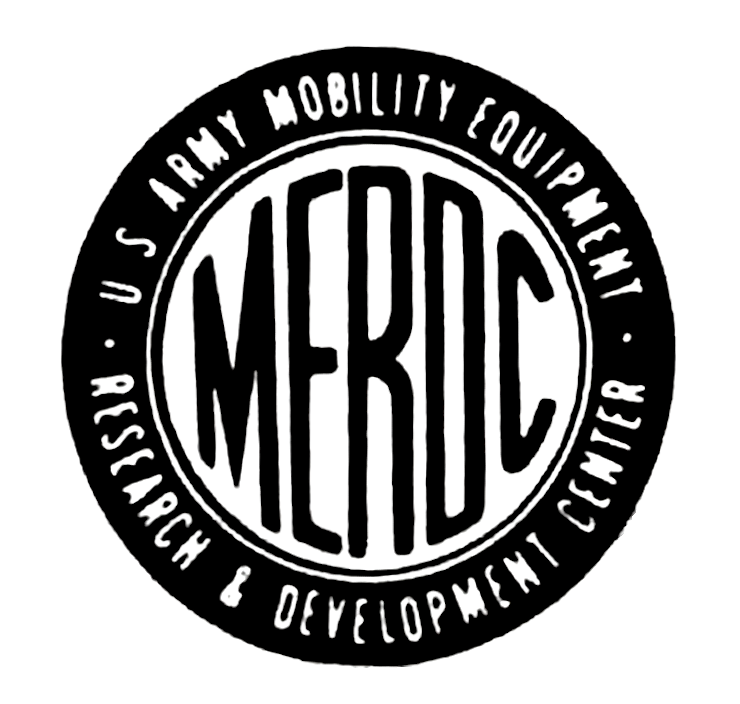
- MERDC logo alternate (1975)

The ERDL was re-designated as Mobility Equipment Research and Development Center (MERDC) on 1 September 1967. MERDC also served as the Directorate of Research and Engineering for US Army Mobility Equipment Command (MECOM).

The center performed research, development and evaluation necessary for the procurement and support of the major mobility items managed by the command. In it, five assigned commodity groups—materiel transportation and handling, troop support, construction – and providing technical support and assistance to equipment users.

Facilities available to MERDC included a test area of 820 acres (3,300,000 m^{2}) on the west side of Shirley Highway, a part of the Fort Belvoir complex. A major portion of this area was used for testing of detectors and sensors.

In 1972, MERDC had a workforce of 1,300 employees, of which approximately 500 were scientists and engineers.

In 1973, MERDC became an agency of the newly-formed US Army Troop Support Command (TROSCOM). MERDC remained part of TROSCOM until 1975, when the center began to report directly to AMC.

In 1976, MERDC became the Mobility Equipment Research and Development Command (MERADCOM), on 23 January 1976, having been given full command status.

== Belvoir Research, Development & Engineering Center ==
Belvoir Research, Development & Engineering Center
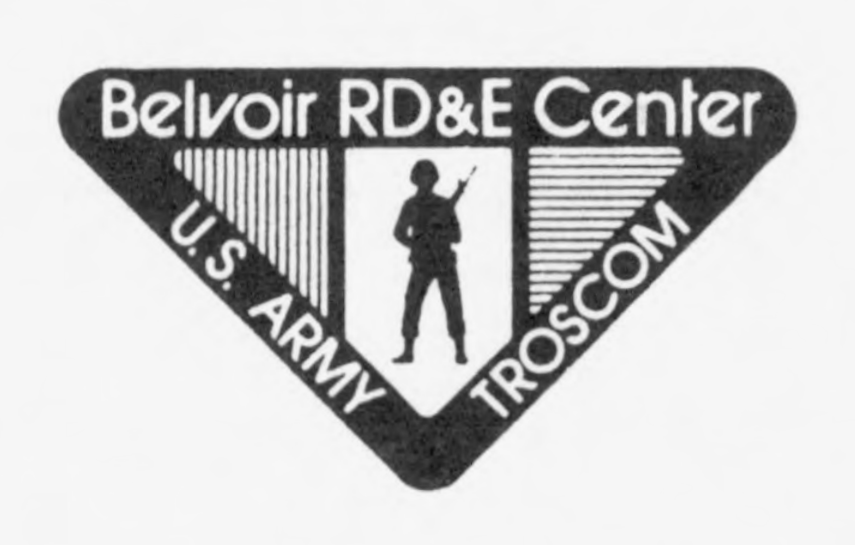
- BRDEC logo
- Active: 1984–unknown
- Country: United States
- Branch: US Army
- Type: Military R&D organization
- Garrison/HQ: Fort Belvoir, Virginia

On 1 March 1984, MERADCOM was disestablished. Its functions were divided between the newly established Aviation Systems Command (AVSCOM) and Troop Support Command (TROSCOM). Around the same time, the Belvoir Research and Development Center was formed in its place. Shortly afterward, the word "engineering" was added to its name.

== See also ==
- Soldier Systems Center Natick
- PEO Soldier, program executive office
