= Camouflage Central-Europe =

French woodland camouflage pattern

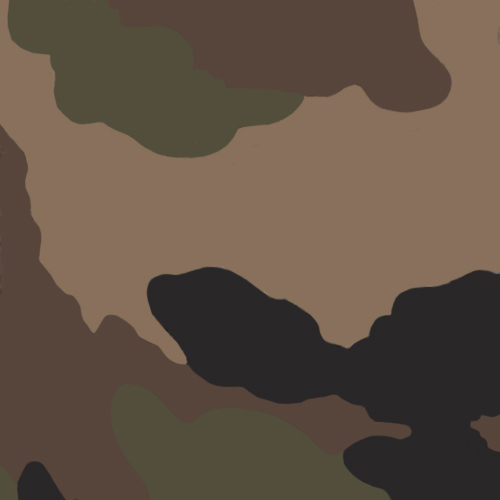
- A CCE swatch fabric sample
- Type: Military camouflage
- Place of origin: France

Service history
- In service: 1994–present
- Used by: See Users
- Wars: Bosnian War; War in Afghanistan (2001–2021); Operation Serval

Production history
- Manufacturer: 1991–present
- Variants: See § Variants

The Camouflage Central-Europe (French: Camouflage Centre-Europe) is the standard camouflage pattern of the French Armed Forces.

It is also used for vehicles of the French Army but with different shapes, since 1986, it took six years to generalize it to the entire military fleet. It is now being replaced since 2020 by the "Scorpion Camouflage" which is intended for new generation vehicles.

== History ==
Camouflage Central-Europe (CCE) was introduced in 1991, replacing both TAP 47 pattern camouflage and khaki F2 uniforms as used by the French military. But the pattern was brought to service by 1994.

In 2018, a contract worth €50 million was made for new combat suits in CCE camo pattern. In 2019, the Tenue Combat F3 uniform was announced to be the standard uniform in CCE for the French Army.

In 2024, the CCE is being replaced by a Multicam-based camo called the BME.

== Design ==
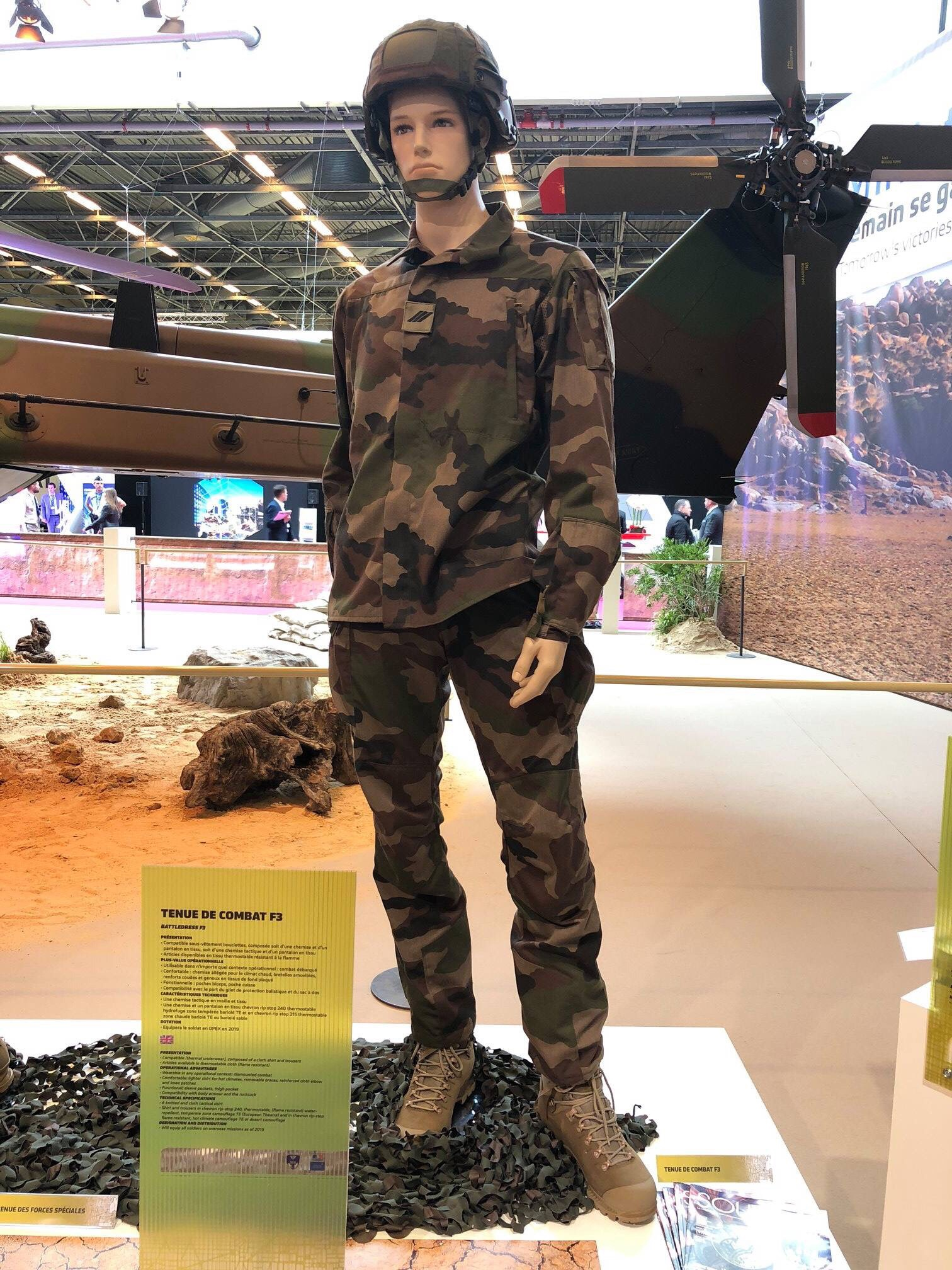
The French Army's Tenue De Combat F3 uniform in CCE.

It is suggested that the design of the CCE was primarily based around the summer foliage of Fontainebleau forest. The design is made of black branches and large horizontal medium green and brown colored elements on a tan background, being inspired by the U.S. Woodland pattern.

Two variants of the CCE are used in French military uniforms, which consist of the Uniform T3 and the Uniform T4.

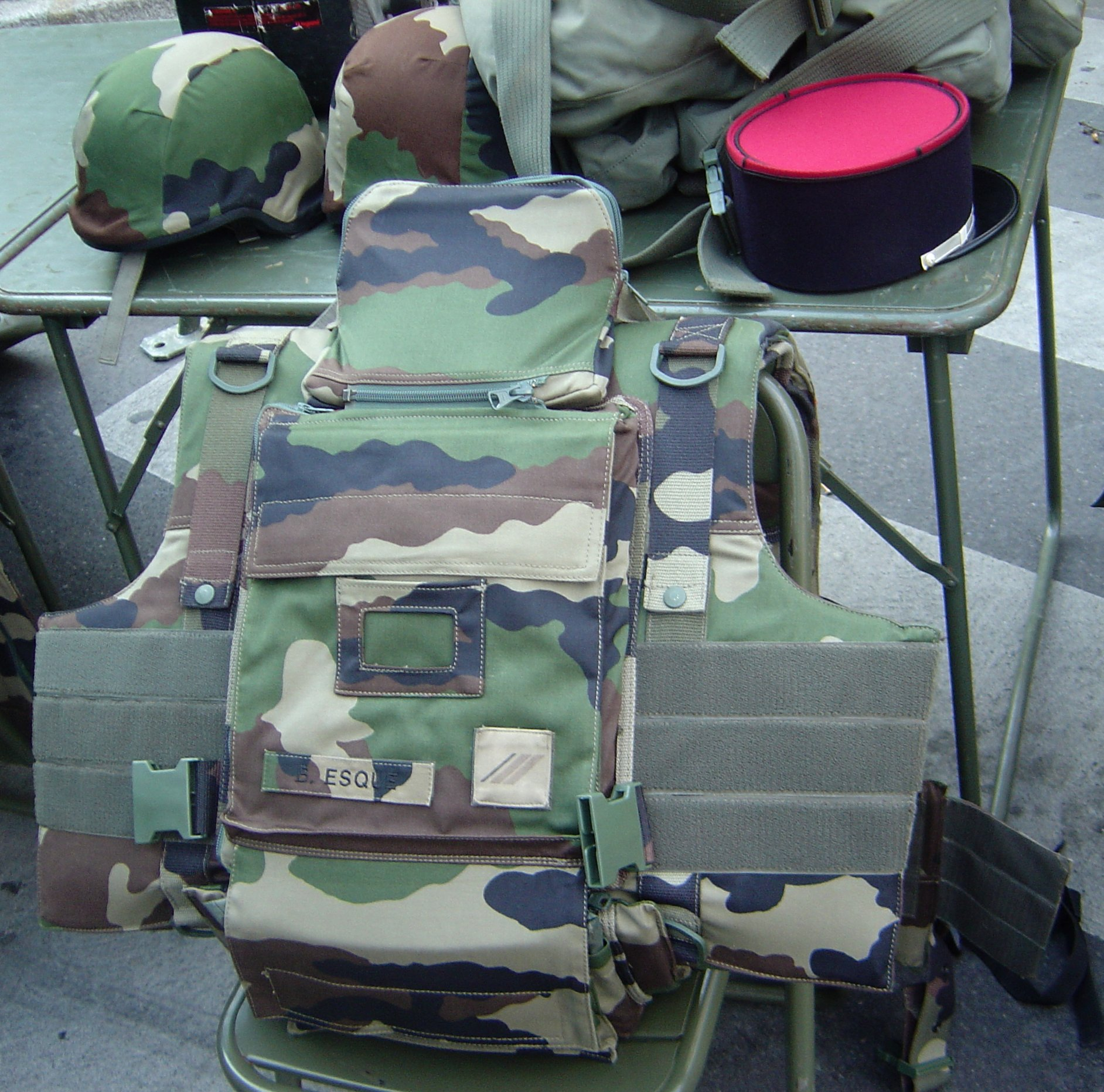
French body armour and helmet covers in Camouflage Central-Europe.

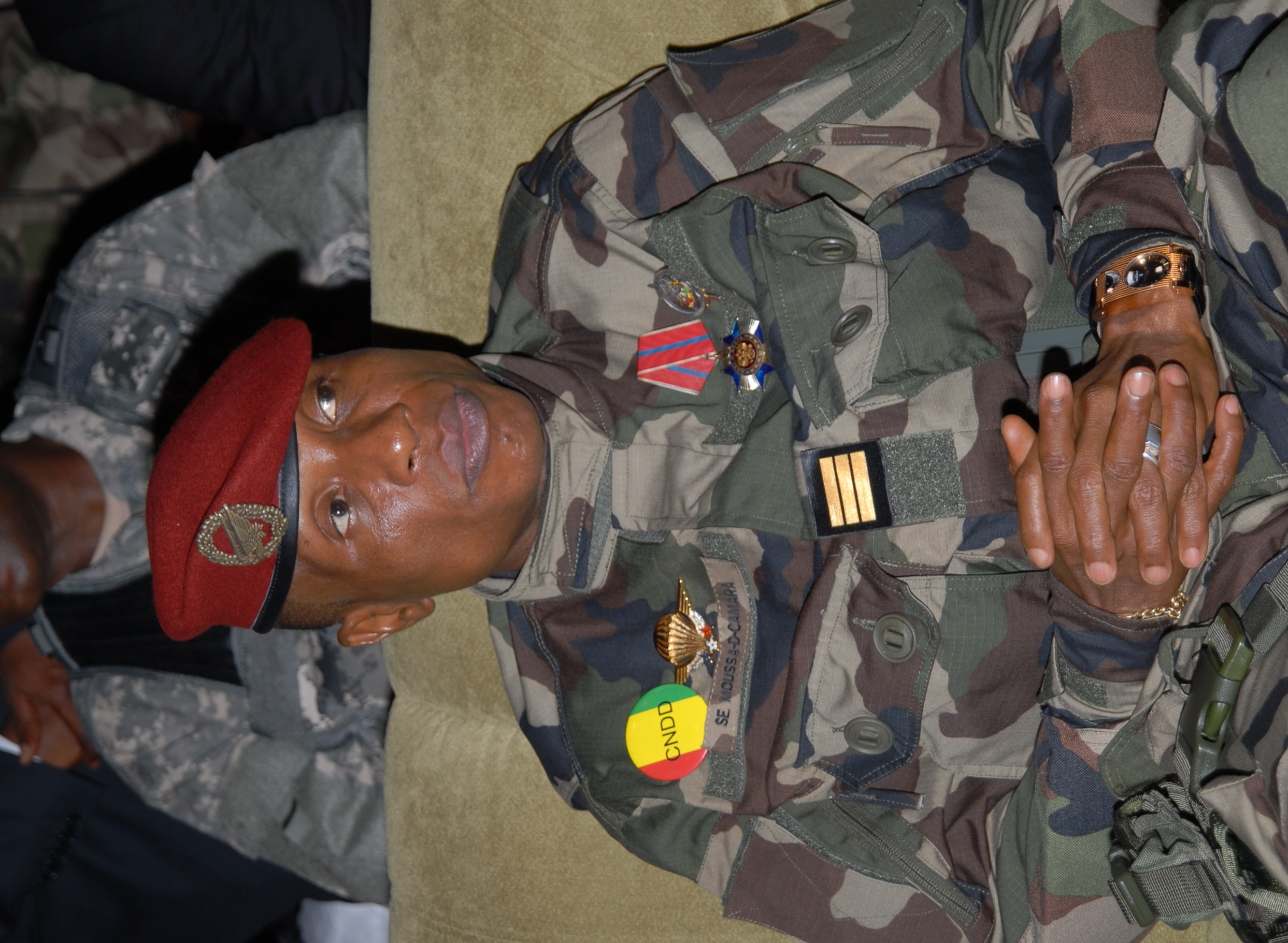
Moussa Dadis Camara of the Guinean Army wearing CCE in 2009.

== Users ==
- Austria: Vests with the pattern used by Austrian Stabilisation Force in Bosnia and Herzegovina soldiers in 2004.
- Cape Verde: Used by the Cape Verdean National Guard.
- Central African Republic: CCE clones used by CAR military units.
- Comoros: CCE clones used by Comoran military units.
- France: Introduced by the French military in 1991, but only adopted in service in 1994.
- India: Used a similar camouflage pattern inspired by CCE for Indian troops from 2006, officially designated as PC-DPM Being replaced by new disruptive digital pattern made by NIFT from 2022. To be retired by 2026.
- Fourth Republic of Madagascar: Used by Malagasy troops in 2009 Malagasy coup d'etat.
- Russia: Used by Alpha Group.
- Qatar: Used by Qatari troops deployed to Lebanon in 2006.
- Ukraine: Used by Maksym I.(surnom - Français) and Kastuś Kalinoŭski Regiment.

== Former users ==
- Third Republic of Madagascar / High Transitional Authority

== See also ==
- Camouflage Daguet, the French military's desert camouflage pattern.
