= Tactical Assault Camouflage =

United States camouflage pattern

Tactical Assault Camouflage, also called TACAM, is a 2004 camouflage pattern exclusively used by the National Counterterrorism Center of the United States.

The pattern was designed as an experiment to show the ability of fractal patterns, breaking up a soldier's outline and symmetry. The fractal pattern and harsh geometric figures in the pattern meld well in urban and suburban areas, where it is used.

== See also ==
- MARPAT
