= Granite B =

Granite B Digital Camouflage Pattern
- Granite B swatch
- Type: Military camouflage pattern
- Place of origin: Republic of Korea

Service history
- In service: 2011-present
- Used by: Republic of Korea Army, Republic of Korea Navy and Republic of Korea Air Force

Production history
- Designer: Banglim Co., Ltd.
- Designed: 2008
- Manufacturer: Banglim Co., Ltd.

Granite B (Korean: 디지털 무늬, lit. 'Digital camouflage-pattern') or digital 5-color granite camouflage pattern is a camouflage pattern of the Republic of Korea Armed Forces combat uniform made by mixing five colors including earth color, bush, tree trunk, charcoal, and coniferous tree.

In 2017, the Ministry of National Defense made a program called the "Warrior Platform Project" for began to develop new camouflage pattern, and at the same time there was public discussion about a new combat uniform to replace the existing Granite B camouflage pattern. The research project resulted in several prototypes being presented at the 2018 Defense Exhibition. However, despite considerable study and expense, it has been discontinued and this digital combat uniform is still in use into present era.

== History ==
ROK Marine Corps members with "Tonghab" camouflage.

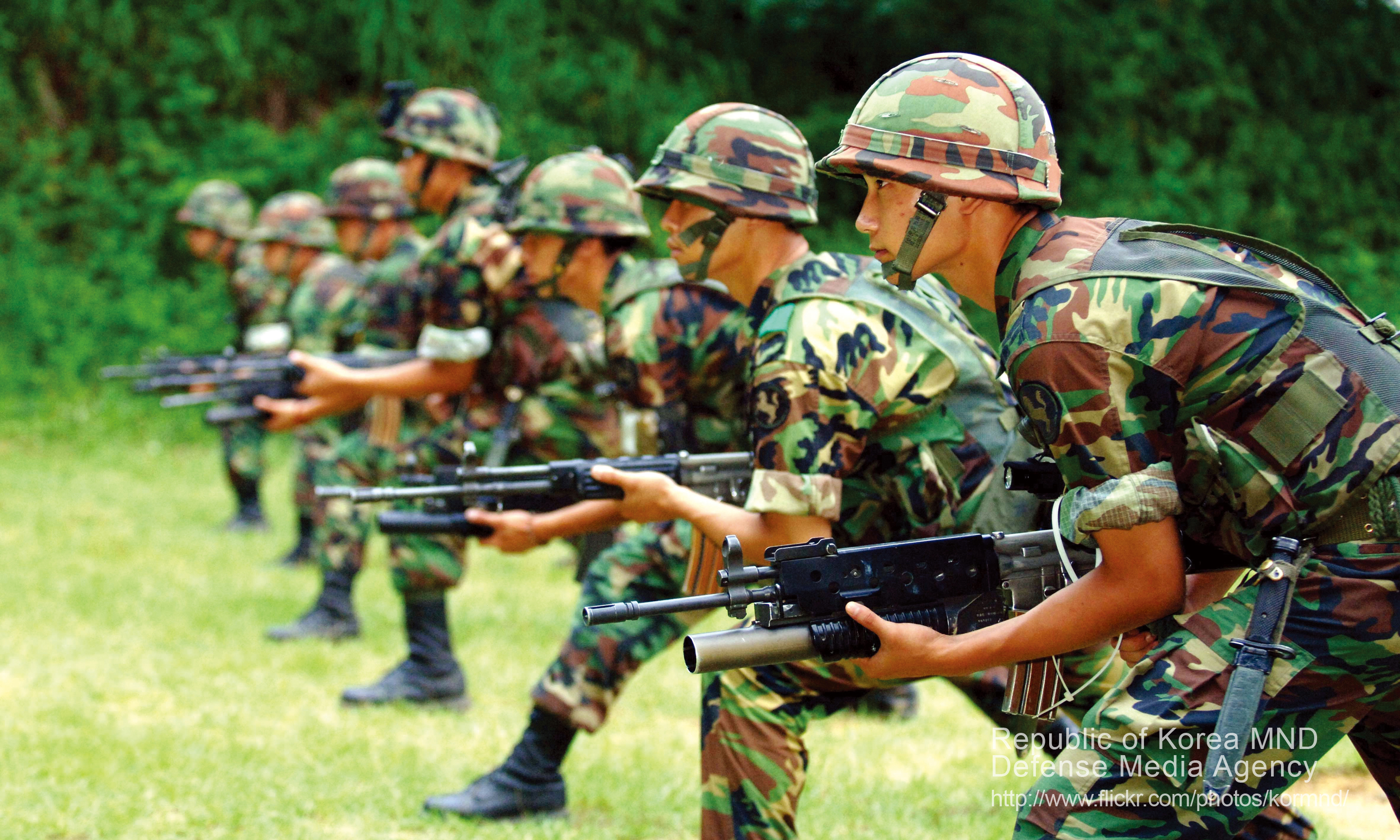
ROK Army members with "Tonghab" camouflage

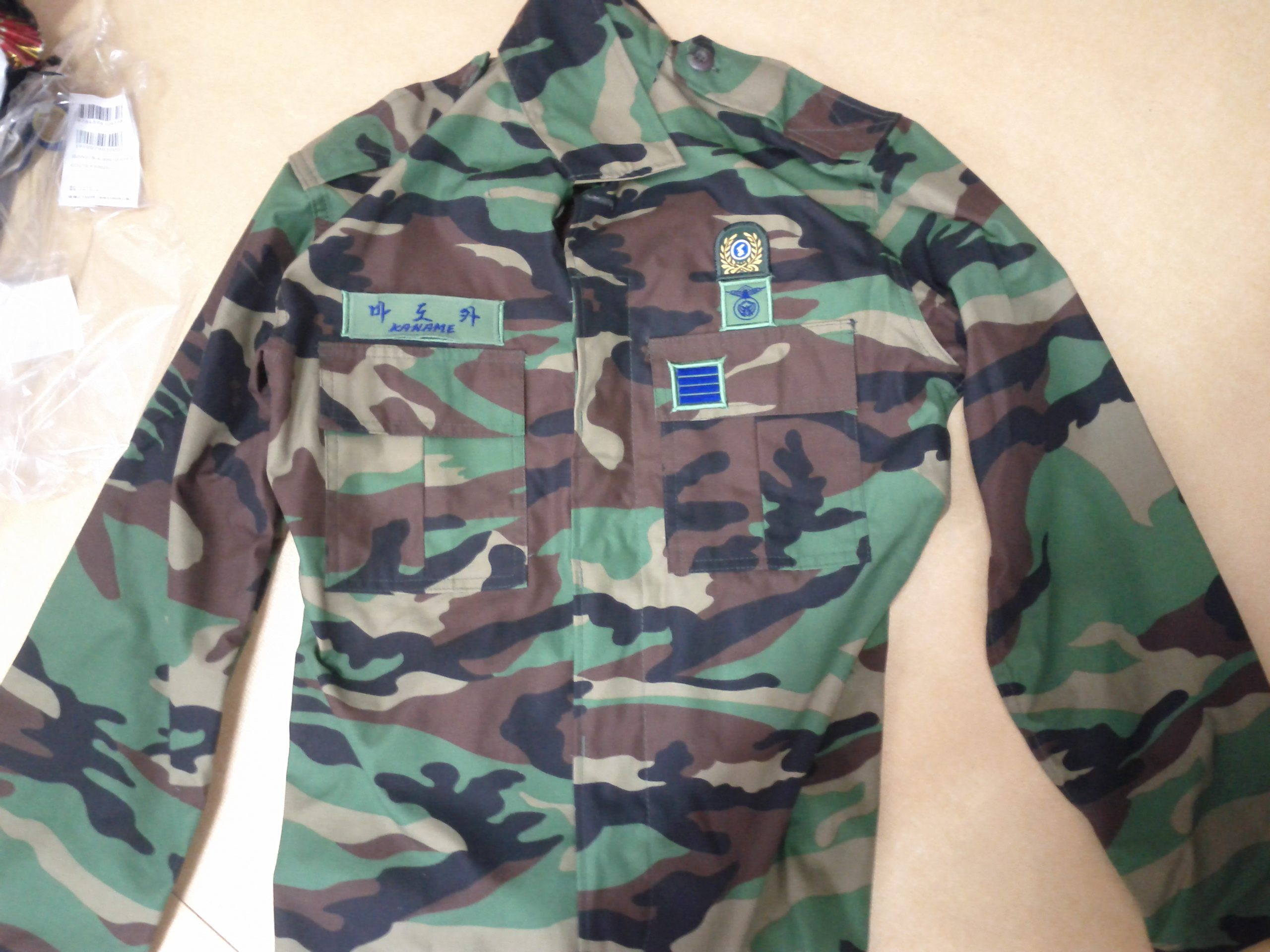
ROK Air Force combat uniform in the "Tonghab" camouflage, this belongs to reservist.

The South Korean military, which had been using the existing U.S. Army Woodland Combat Uniform-like called "Tonghab" (통합, lit. 'Unified') or "Gaeguri" (개구리, lit. 'Frog') in the 1990s, began developing new uniforms in the late 2000s and started issuing new digital camouflage combat uniforms in the 2010s.

The difference from the old Tonghab camouflage is based on digital pixels. The background for the issuance of this new combat uniform is that U.S. military requests for uniform improvements began in 2004, and the project got on track in earnest when the Department of Defense accepted the plan to improve the new combat uniform in May 2009. At that time, the United States had already introduced ACU combat uniforms produced using digital pixels such as Universal Camouflage Pattern. For landscape and environment context, there were three test types: granite, pine, and rock, and the granite pattern, which is very common in the terrain of the Korean Peninsula, was finally selected. Unlike the existing uniform, the new combat uniform also enhanced the functionality of the uniform itself and was manufactured using advanced fibers. This Granite B combat uniforms began to be issued to the Army, Navy, and Air Force starting in 2014.

== Development ==
The development of a new combat uniform began in April 2008 at the request of the Ministry of National Defense, with the participation of Professors such as Professor Jin Seong-mo and Professor Nam Yun-ja of Kookmin University, Professor Choi Seong-mi of Dongseoul University, and the Korea Institute of Industrial Technology, and it was completed in November of the same year. Starting with some test in September 2010, and it become the standard camouflage pattern for the entire branches, except for the Marine Corps, which utilizes its own distinct camouflage pattern called Wavepat.

== North Korean copy ==
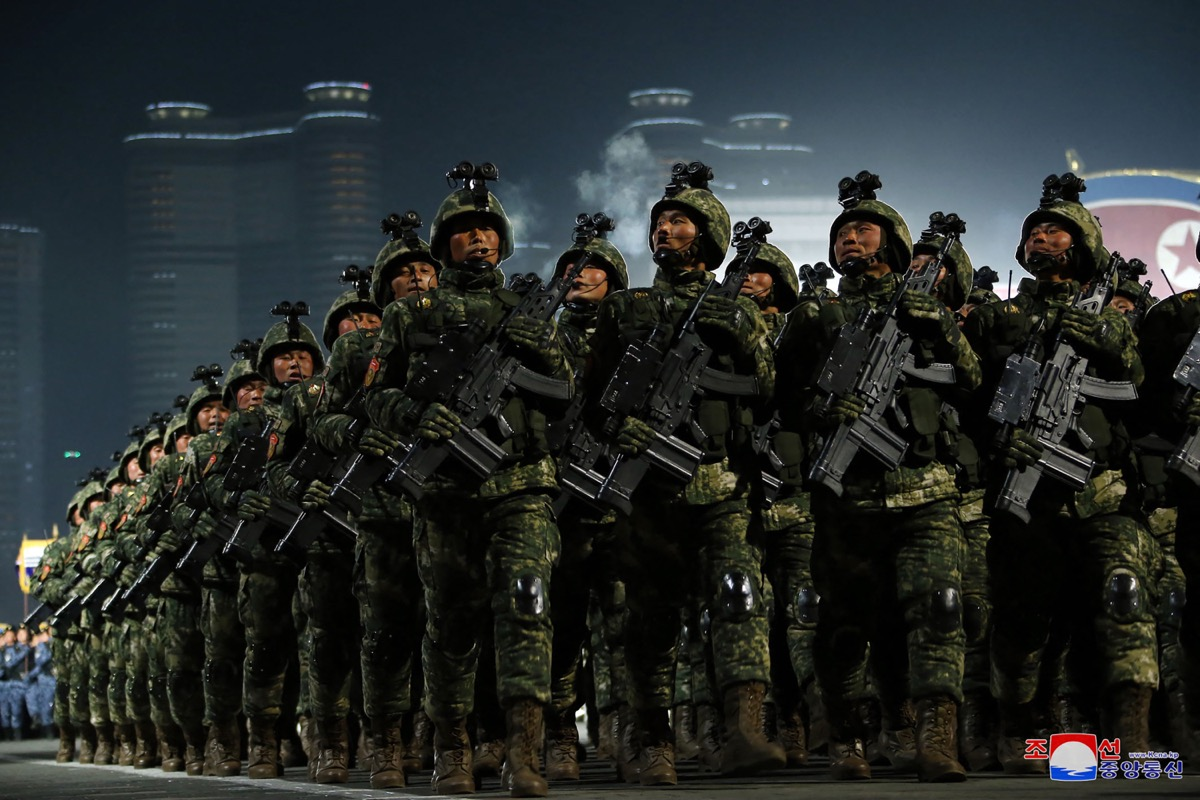
One of example of Korea People's Army newest digital camouflage pattern.

During North Korean military parade on 10 October 2020, a range of at least 5 new pixelated camouflage patterns and new soldiers’ combat gear of all branches, including the Korea People's Army Ground Forces were shown for the first time. Even though it was difficult to tell the patterns apart from each other, two different green based designs, an arid camouflage design, blue camouflage design, and a two-color pixelated camouflage pattern for mountain and winter warfare were all observed. Also, the use of Multicam pattern combat uniforms by North Korean military personnel was first documented in 2020 during the same parade, although uniforms in this design may well have appeared in the inventory much earlier.

During the parade on January 14, 2021, the Korea People's Army Ground Forces wore digital camouflage uniforms and combat boots similar to the desert-colored combat boots that the Republic of Korea Army recently began issuing. The shape and material of the pockets match the initial type of the Republic of Korea Armed Forces standard combat uniform, and the pattern is also in the form of a color inversion. There was also an article that said some Korean-Chinese merchants were involved in leaking Korean military camouflage patterns. However, until first quarter of 2022, these camouflage been provided to strategic forces and military parade units actively mobilized for propaganda. But in 2026, North Korean military wore digital camouflage uniform, similar to Granite B and EMR camouflage.

== Gallery ==
ROK Army members outfitted with Granite B

ROK Navy commissioned members outfitted with Granite B

Commander of Combined Forces Command outfitted with Granite B. (Note: The characteristic that distinguishes the Air Force from other branches is the blue color of the name tape and rank insignia.)

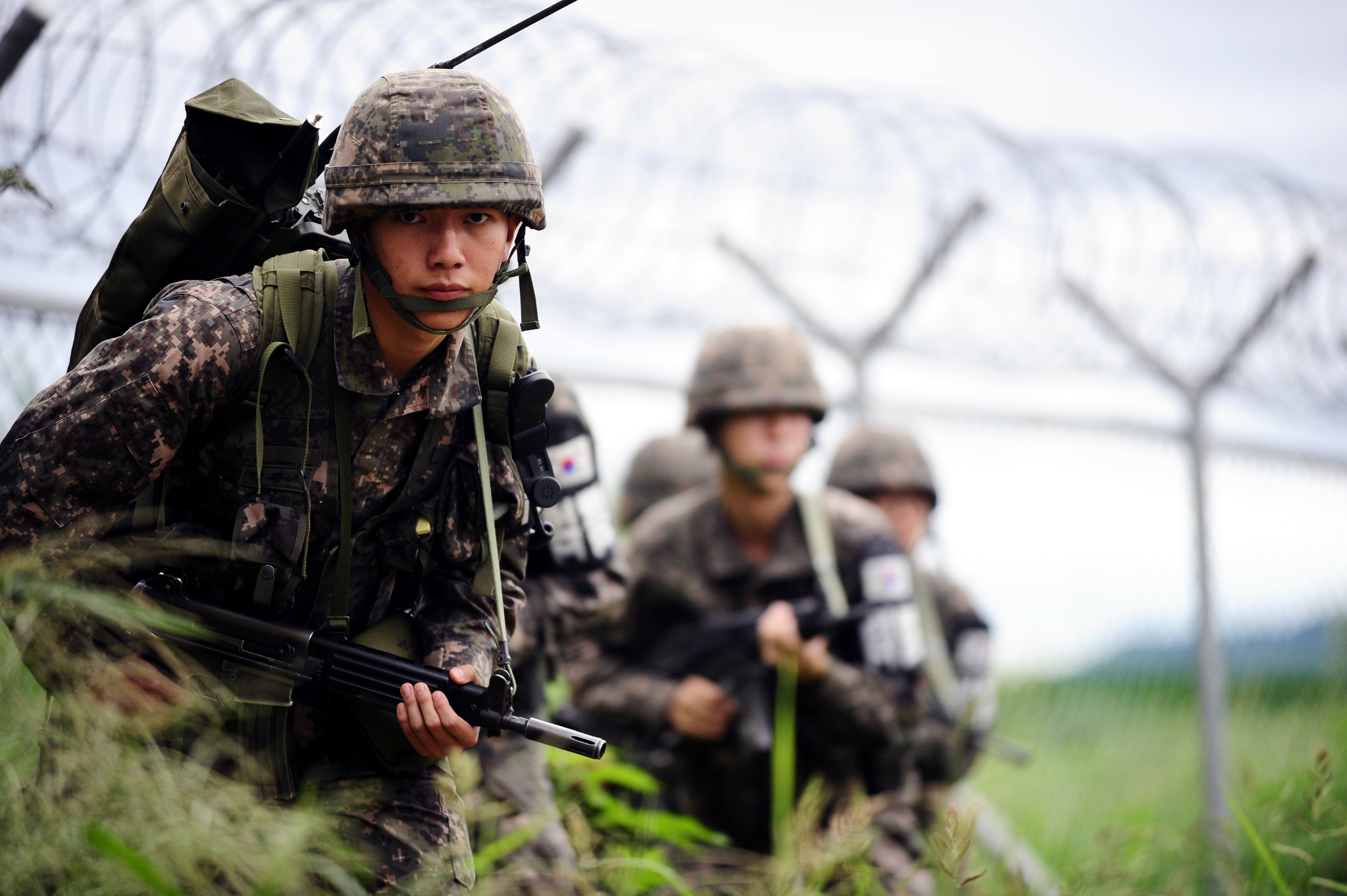
ROK Army soldiers patrolling the Demilitarized Zone, outfitted with Granite B

== See also ==
- U.S. Woodland
- Universal Camouflage Pattern
