= ERDLator =

The ERDLator was a field water treatment device developed during World War II at the U.S. Army's United States Army Engineer Research and Development Laboratory (ERDL) at Ft. Belvoir, Virginia.

Technically named the "Water Purification Unit, Van-Type, Body Mounted, Electric Motor Driven", the laboratory's acronym was incorporated into the name of the purification device itself, creating the name by which it was most widely known, ERDLator, pronounced "erda-later".

The device was introduced into the field as a van-type body-mounted mobile unit, and proved vitally important to the operational effectiveness of deployed units under harsh field conditions, providing not only the water needed for survival, but clean potable water for staying healthy. This passage from a description of the United States Marine Corps Engineer Battalion illustrates the ERDLator's significance:

"One of the most important units was the water supply platoon. This platoon operated...water purification plants called Erdalators [sic] that could remove silt and suspended matter, filter, and purify even contaminated stream water. Producing from 1-3,000 gallons (about 4,000 to 12,000 liters) per day -- the larger number was achieved using separate large rubberized settling tanks -- one unit could adequately supply an infantry battalion under adverse conditions"

ERDLator units of several production capacities were used for field water purification during the Vietnam War.

The unit was replaced in 1979 by the Reverse Osmosis Water Purification Unit (ROWPU) ("row-pew"), also developed by a U.S. Army laboratory. Developing water purification systems for military use has led to technological breakthroughs which have benefited the civilian community; the ERDLator was evaluated for technology transfer to the civilian sector for the decontamination of water polluted with asbestos fibers.
