= Hungarian camouflage pattern 2015M =

Style of camouflage

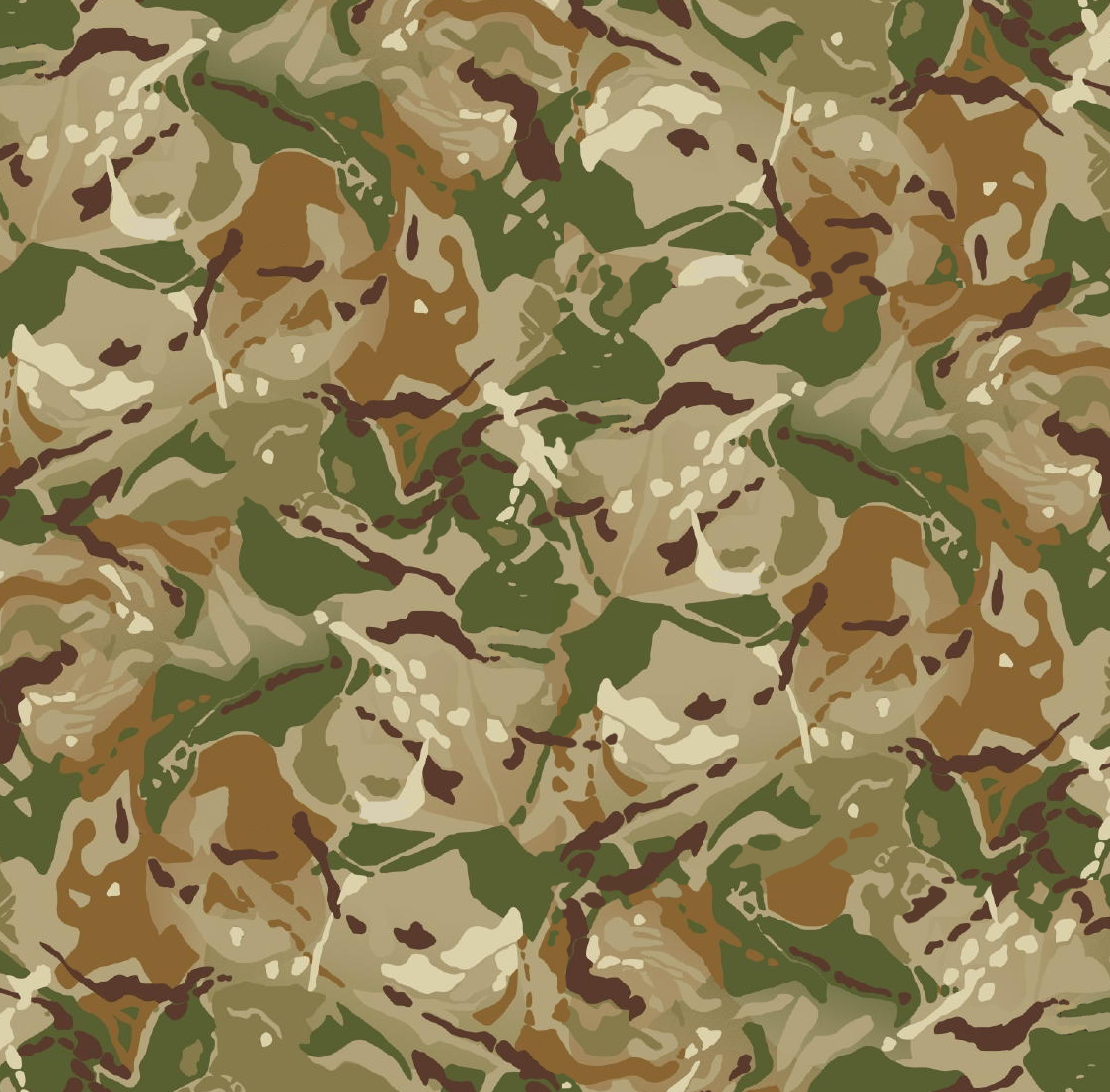
- Woodland camouflage fabric
- Type: Military camouflage pattern
- Place of origin: Hungary

Service history
- In service: 2015–present
- Used by: See Users
- Wars: War in Afghanistan

Production history
- Designed: 2015

The Hungarian camouflage pattern 2015M, also known as HunCam, is a family of 7-color camouflage pattern.

== History ==
The Hungarian Defence Force started experimenting with camouflage patterns after 2010. Crye Precision's MultiCam pattern was determined to be the best performing, across the widest range of environments and was subsequently selected as the basis for the new pattern.

First unveiled and designed in 2015, the HunCam was known to be used with Hungarian troops in peacekeeping operations throughout Kosovo in 2017.

== Design ==
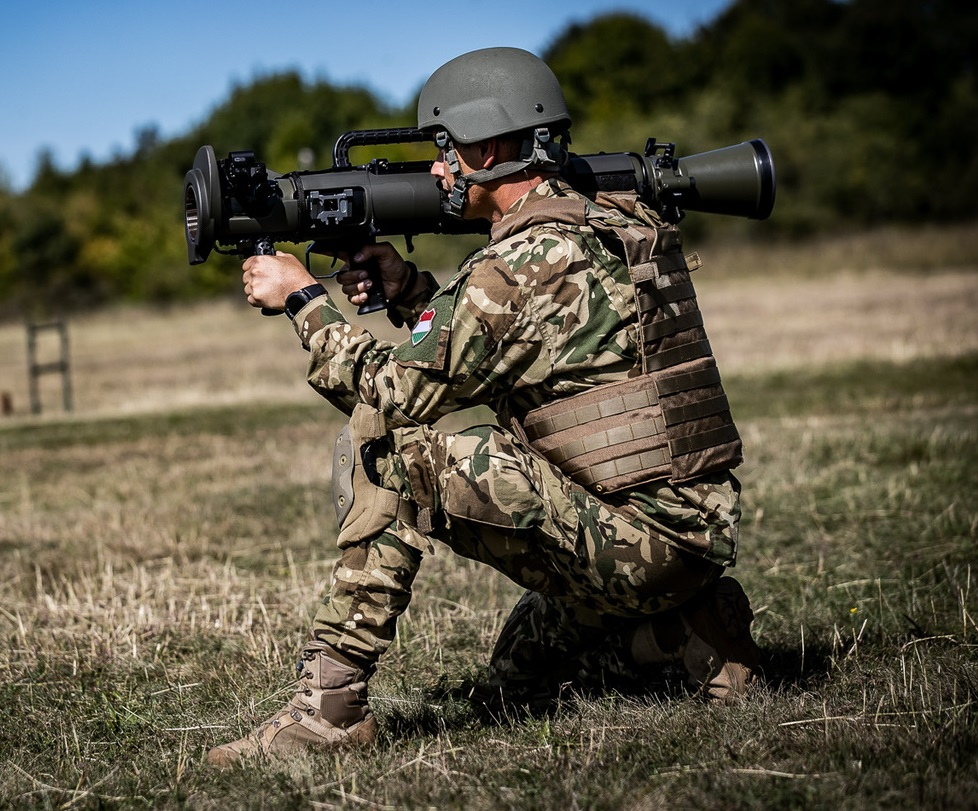
Hungarian soldier wearing 2015M pattern uniform

HunCam was designed for the use of the Hungarian Defence Force in varied environments, seasons, elevations, and light conditions.

HunCam has a background of a brown to light tan gradient, overprinted with a dark green, olive green, and lime green gradient and a top layer of opaque dark brown and cream-colored shapes spread throughout the pattern.

The colors of the MultiCam pattern were used in the development of the HunCam Pattern.

This allows for the overall appearance to change from predominantly green to predominantly brown in different areas of the fabric, while having smaller shapes to break up the larger background areas.

== Adoption ==
Hungarian forces deployed in Afghanistan used this new pattern from August 2016 onwards.

== Users ==
- Hungary: Hungarian Defence Force

== See also ==
- MultiCam#Hungary
