= ERDL pattern =

Camouflage pattern

- The two variants of the ERDL pattern: The initial green-dominant version (top) and the succeeding brown-dominant version (bottom)
- Type: Military camouflage pattern
- Place of origin: United States

Service history
- In service: 1948–1980s (U.S. military service)
- Used by: U.S. Marine Corps (former); U.S. Navy (former); U.S. Air Force (former); U.S. Army (former); See Users (for other non-U.S. users)
- Wars: Vietnam War; Laotian Civil War; Cambodian Civil War; Invasion of Grenada; Operation Golden Pheasant; Invasion of Panama; Syrian Civil War

Production history
- Designer: United States Army Engineer Research and Development Laboratory under Chief of Camouflage Adolph H. Humphreys and chief designer John Hopkins
- Designed: 1948
- Produced: 1948–1981

The ERDL pattern, also known as the Leaf pattern, is a camouflage pattern developed by the United States Army at its Engineer Research & Development Laboratories (ERDL) in 1948. It was not used until the Vietnam War, when it was issued to elite reconnaissance and special operations units beginning early 1967.

The pattern consists of four colors printed in an interlocking pattern. It was initially produced in a green-dominant colorway, consisting of large organic shapes in olive green and brown, black 'branches' and light green 'leaf highlights'. Shortly after it was first fielded in Vietnam a brown-dominant scheme with the light green replaced by light tan was introduced.

== History ==
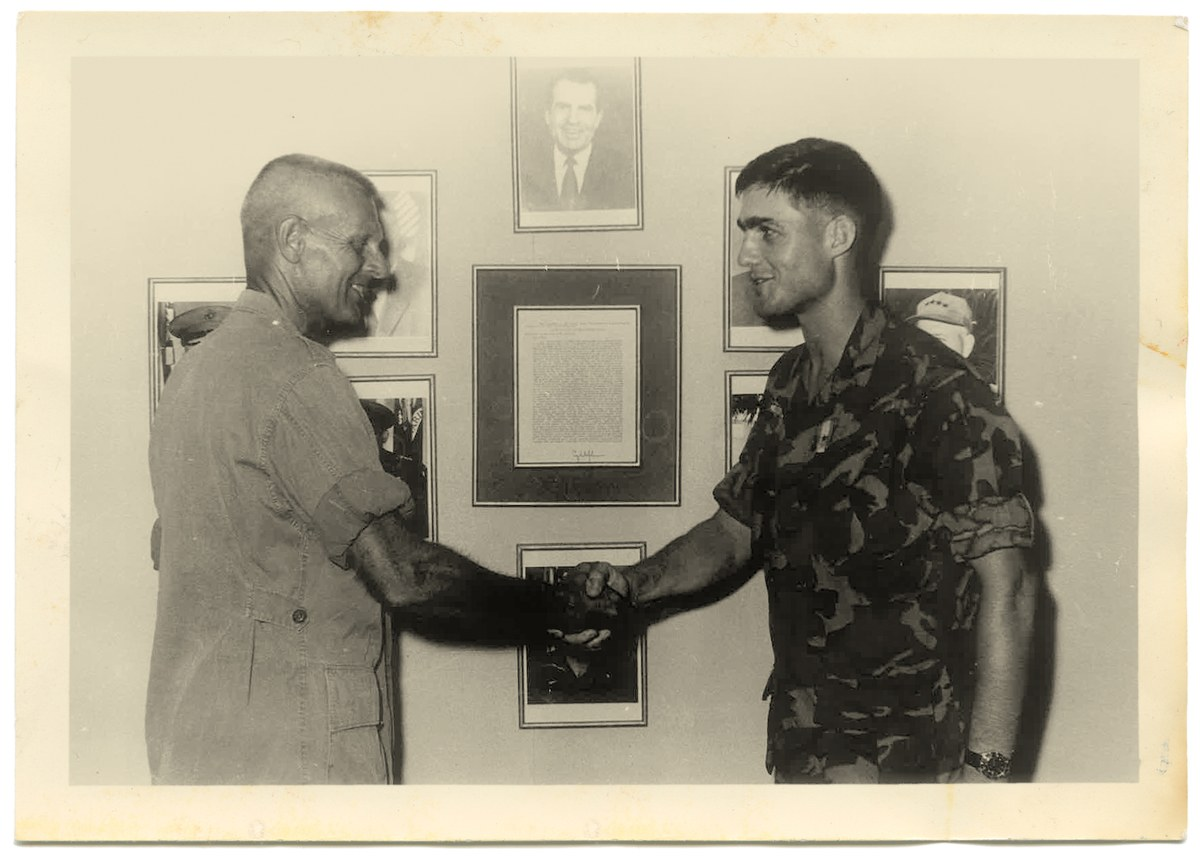
Robert Mueller wearing an ERDL-patterned uniform in 1969.

The United States Marine Corps (USMC) adopted the green-dominant version as standard issue in South Vietnam in 1968, and later the U.S. Army introduced it on a wide scale in Southeast Asia.

The ERDL-pattern combat uniform was identical in cut to the OG-107 Tropical Combat uniform, commonly called "jungle fatigues", it was issued alongside. It was common for Marines to wear mixes of ERDL and OG-107 jungle fatigues, which was authorized owing to periodic shortages. Australian S.A.S.R. and New Zealand S.A.S. members were also occasionally issued U.S.-spec tropical combat uniforms in ERDL during their time in the Vietnam War. By the end of the Vietnam War, U.S. service members wore camouflage combat dress as the norm.

Following the withdrawal of the U.S. military from South Vietnam in 1973, the U.S. Army ceased routine issue of camouflage clothing. The 1st Battalion, 13th Infantry Regiment wore the ERDL pattern as an experiment from January 1973 to 1974 in Baumholder, Germany.

In 1976, the Marines obtained the leftover Vietnam War-era ERDL pattern uniforms which became general issue, replacing the solid OG-107 sateen utility/fatigue uniform.

The uniform was used to equip the United States Rapid Deployment Force (RDF) while on tropical missions. Photographs during the 1979 Iranian hostage crisis show U.S. Marines guarding the U.S. embassy wearing the RDF version ERDL uniforms when they were taken hostage by Iranian revolutionaries.

It was not until 1981 that the Army approved another camouflaged uniform. That year it officially introduced the M81 Battle Dress Uniform (BDU) in a four-color woodland pattern, an enlarged and slightly altered version of ERDL, to supply all branches of the U.S. military. Despite being phased out after that date, the ERDL pattern continued to see service up into the 1990s. ERDL was notably seen being worn by various US troops during the Invasion of Panama and seen in 1996 during US peacekeeping operations in Africa.

=== Garment types, designs, and use in Southeast Asia (1967–72) ===
The ERDL pattern was used on official and unofficial U.S. military garments in Southeast Asia, in both ground and aviation garment versions, from 1967 to the war's end. Early production on the ERDL ran into problems due to roller slippage, which results in inconsistencies with the patterns that were printed.

On official ground combat garments, the ERDL pattern was first applied to the third model Tropical Combat Uniform around 1967 and was printed onto a lightweight cotton poplin textile material. This poplin uniform was very short lived, but it did see combat use in Southeast Asia by various U.S. special operations and other units. Soon afterward, the ERDL pattern was printed onto the standard rip-stop cotton textile material. This ERDL rip-stop cotton Tropical Combat Uniform version thus saw wide use in Southeast Asia after 1968, with special operations units and regular units, especially as ground combat operations continued throughout the war up to late 1972.

On official aviation combat garments, the ERDL pattern was used on the USAF Type K-2B flying coveralls, in a cotton poplin textile version. The USAF ERDL coveralls saw some use in Southeast Asia from 1967 to 1969, until replaced by Nomex coveralls in 1970. The U.S. Navy also produced an official ERDL aviation garment in their MIL-C-5390G pattern, produced in a cotton twill textile. These Navy ERDL coveralls saw limited Southeast Asia use from 1967 to 1968, as their Nomex coveralls were already in use.

On unofficial and commercial garments, the ERDL pattern was copied and used by U.S. commercial textile manufacturers in the late 1960s and applied to various commercial camouflage garments for hunting or unofficial military use. Some commercial ERDL garment examples were made using cotton poplin material, and others were made in the standard rip-stop cotton material. Many commercial ERDL garment examples of the time were made in the pattern mirroring the standard OG-107 fatigue uniforms, with a standard tucked-in shirt, and conventional trousers design. These commercial ERDL OG-107 fatigue-style garments did see some combat use in Southeast Asia, such as with U.S. Navy tactical jet aviators in the 1968 timeframe. Some USAF aviators also purchased locally tailor-made ERDL garments for combat and off-duty use. Additionally, some tropical combat uniforms were made by local tailors in the ERDL rip-stop material, which were particularly useful when a classified mission required the use of 'sanitized' or 'sterile' apparel, and equipment.

== Users ==
=== Current ===
- Czech Republic: The Czech Armed Forces use a modified version of the ERDL pattern, known as Woodland pattern vz.95.
- North Korea: Seen in 2012 with North Korean military units.
- South Korea: Clones made for the South Korean air force.

=== Former ===
- Afghanistan: Formerly used by former Afghan National Army Commando and Special forces
- Australia: Formerly used by Australian SAS in the Vietnam War.
- Philippines: Formerly used by the Special Action Force in the 1980s. Also used by the Home Front Defense Group and the Scout Ranger Regiment. Also formerly used by the Philippine Navy.
- New Zealand: Formerly used by New Zealand SAS during (and after) the Vietnam War
- Nicaragua: Formerly used by the Nicaraguan National Guard and saw combat in the 1978–79 Nicaraguan Revolution.
- Panama: Formerly used by the Panama Defense Forces and saw combat in the 1989 Panama Invasion "Just Cause".
- Singapore: Formerly used by the Singaporean military. Known as the No. 4 Uniform.
- South Africa: Some used by Hunter Group and 32 Battalion commandos.
- South Vietnam: Formerly used by the South Vietnamese army, consisting of regular and "invisible" ERDL-type camo.
- Spain: By 1982, Spain began to use a camouflage pattern heavily influenced by the ERDL design. The pattern, black, brown & forest green shapes on a khaki-green background, was initially tested by the Army's special operations companies, but ultimately became the standard issue uniform of the Spanish Armed Forces in 1985 or 1986.
- Syria: Clones made for the Syrian military.
- Taiwan: Formerly used by Taiwanese military.
- Thailand: Formerly used by the Thai military.
- Turkey: Formerly used by Turkish Armed Forces in the late-1980s to the early-1990s.
- United States: Formerly used by the U.S. military until it was phased out in the late-1990s.
- Vietnam: Clones of South Vietnamese ERDL patterns were formerly used by the PAVN.

=== Non-state actors ===
- Karen National Liberation Army
- Khmer People's National Liberation Front: Used Thai-made ERDL camos in the 1980s.
