= Camouflage Daguet =

French military's current desert camouflage

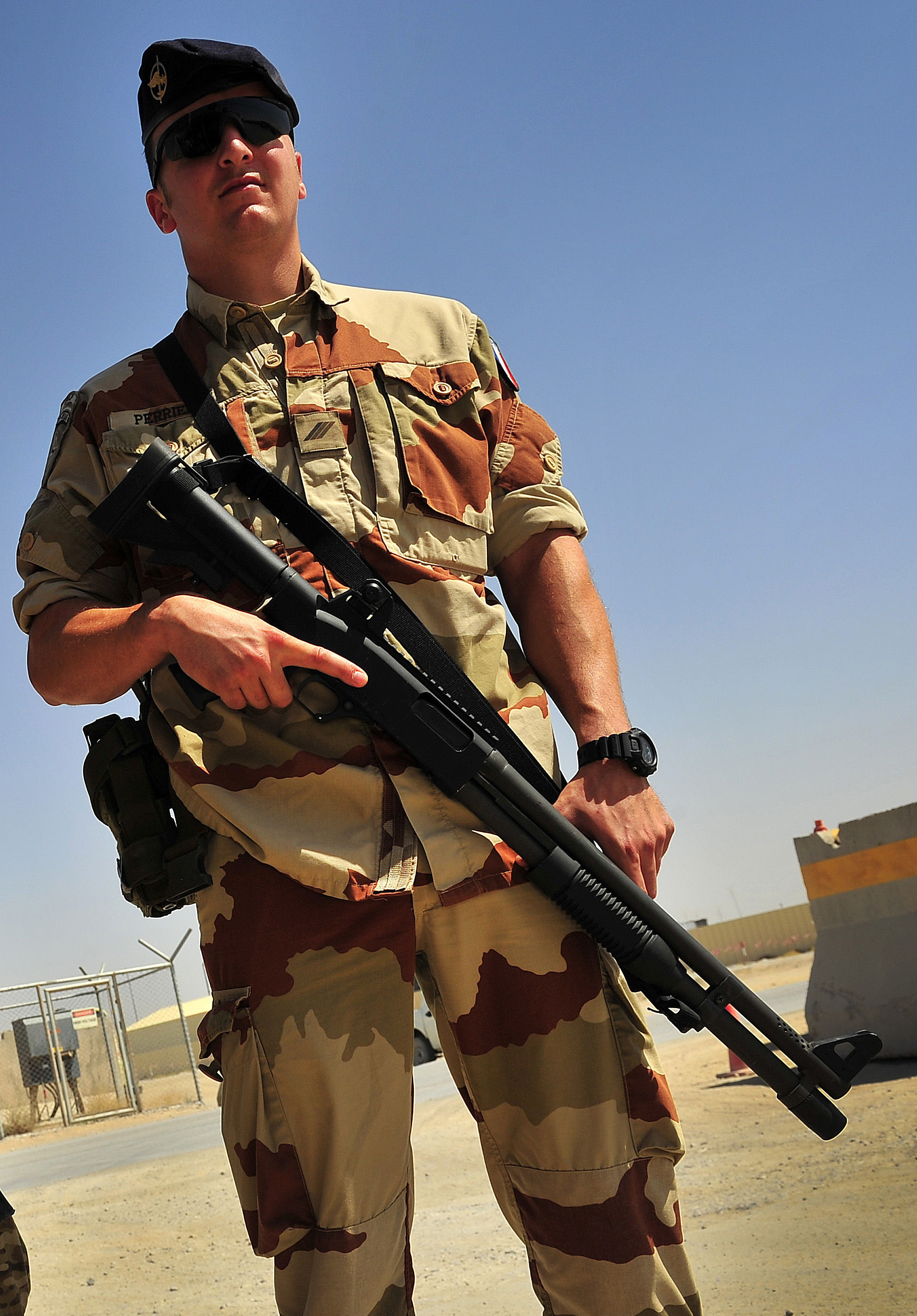
French Air Force Fusilier Commando de l’Air in Kandahar, Afghanistan.

Camouflage Daguet is the French military's current desert camouflage. It is the desert variant of Camouflage Central-Europe.

== History ==
Although it was introduced in 1989, this French desert camouflage model is commonly known as "Daguet" because it is closely associated with Operation Daguet, where French conventional forces used it for the first time.

Prior to the adoption, the French military never considered another camouflage uniform again because of their association with their colonial conflicts.

== Pattern ==
Introduced in 1988, consisting of broad horizontal tan and brown stripes on a sandy background. The Daguet pattern has been issued in separate uniforms for French troops deployed in countries/territories with desert terrain.

== Users ==
- Central African Republic: Daguet clones used by CAR military units.
- France: Adopted by the French military in 1989.
- Ukraine: Used by Ukrainian Forces and Kastuś Kalinoŭski Regiment.
- United Arab Emirates: UAE troops wore Daguet clones in desert-based operations.

== Gallery ==
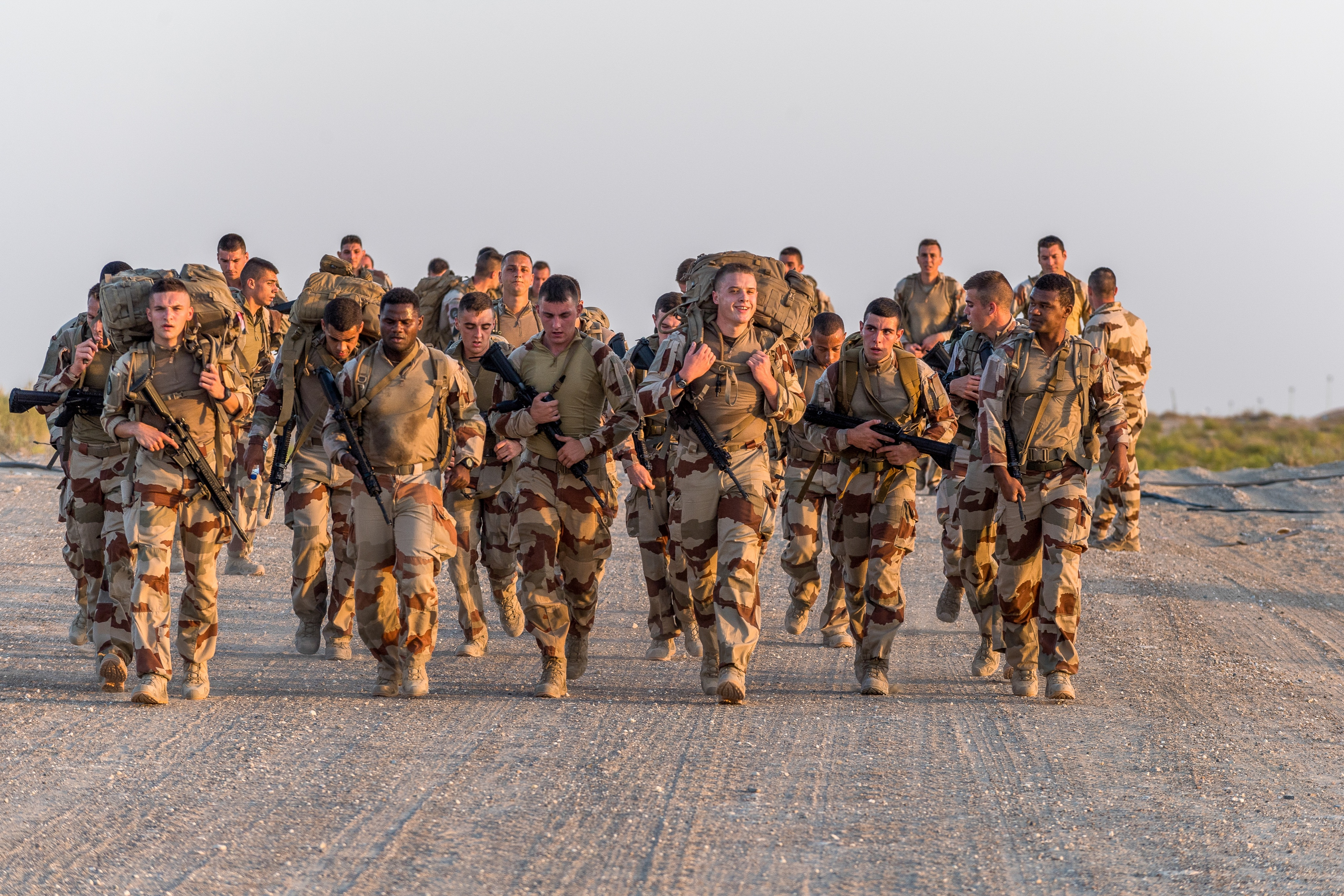
Young French troops in camouflage Daguet (2022).

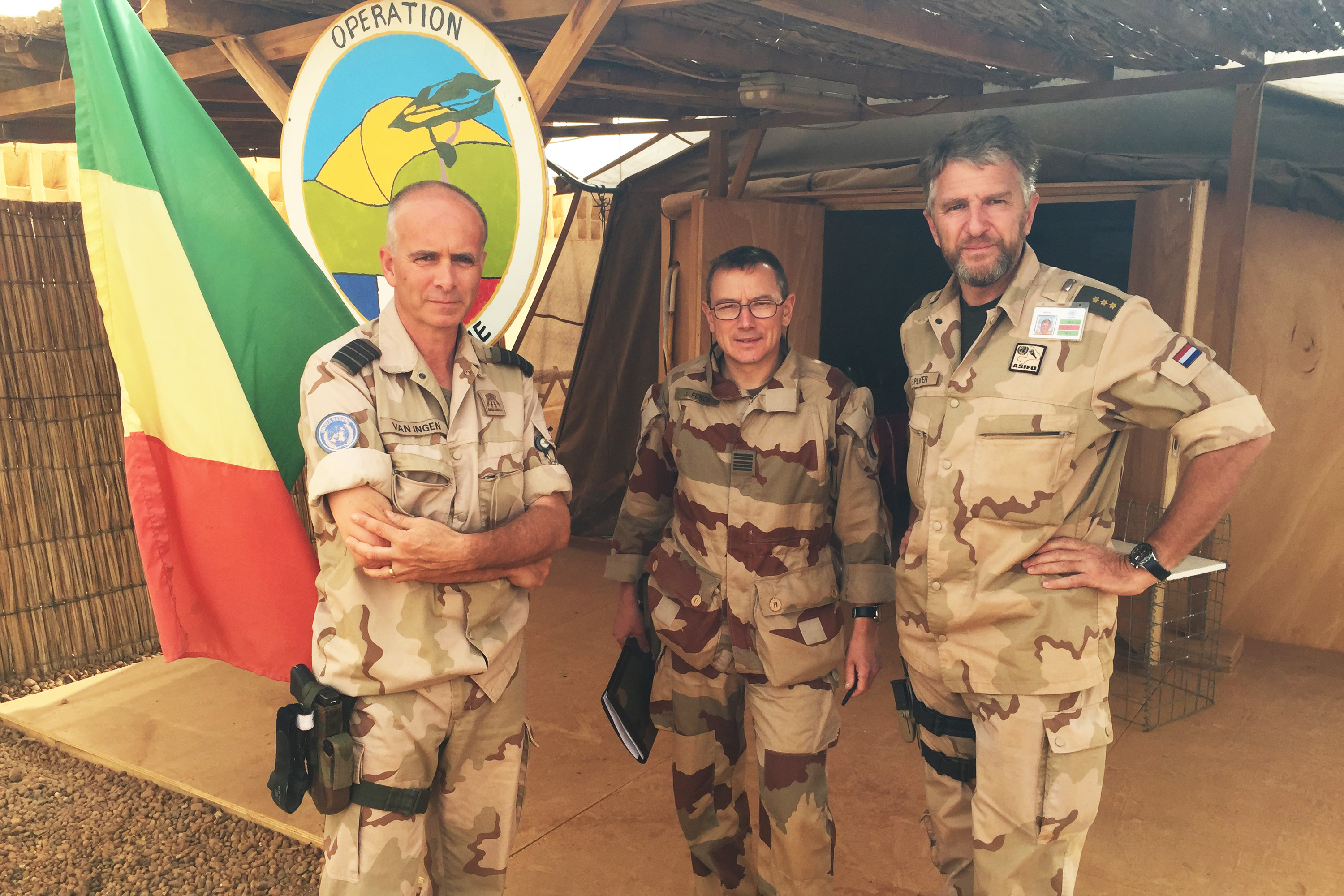
Camouflage Daguet worn by a French officer (OF-5) during Operation Barkhane (2016).

== Bibliography ==
- Newark, Tim (2013). The Book of Camouflage: The Art of Disappearing. Oxford: Osprey. ISBN 978-1782008316.
- Rottman, Gordan L. (1993). Armies of the Gulf War. Bloomsbury: Osprey. ISBN 978-1855322776.
- Larson, Eric H. (2021). Camouflage: International Ground Force Patterns, 1946–2017. Barnsley: Pen & Sword. ISBN 9781526739537.
