= Frog skin camouflage =

U.S. military camouflage pattern

Frog skin
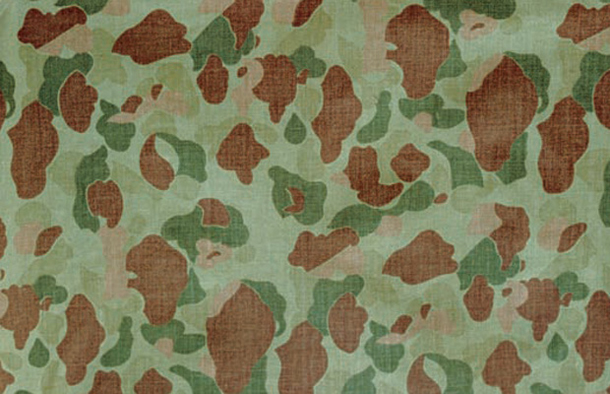
- Frog skin camo fabric
- Type: Military camouflage pattern
- Place of origin: United States

Service history
- In service: 1942–1960s
- Used by: See Users
- Wars: World War II; Korean War; First Indochina War; Bay of Pigs Invasion; Vietnam War; Turkish invasion of Cyprus; Iran-Iraq War

Production history
- Designer: Norvell Gillespie
- No. produced: 150,000 (Initial Numbers)

Frog skin, also known as duck hunter, is a camouflage pattern with mottle and disruptive coloration to blend into the environment. It is named for its similarity to a frog's crypsis skin.

The frog skin pattern was the United States military's first attempt at disruptive coloration camouflage.

== Description ==
Frog skin camouflage consists of two variants, a five-color pattern of green and brown shapes on a pale green cloth base intended for use in wooded and jungle areas, and a three-color pattern of brown shapes on a pale tan cloth base intended for wear on beaches and other plant-bare terrain. The pattern was cost used the US Army's M1942 Reversible Spot Pattern and U.S. Marine Corps' P42 Camo utility uniforms, which were made from herringbone twill (HBT) cotton fabric and featured reversible construction, with the jungle pattern on one side and the beach pattern on the other.

== History ==
=== World War II ===
The US Army began experiments with camouflage in 1940–1941. The frog skin pattern was designed by Norvell Gillespie, a civilian horticulturist and the gardening editor for Better Homes & Gardens magazine, at the request of the US military. 150,000 uniforms in the pattern were ordered.

In 1942, the Marine Raiders were the first issued a frog skin pattern uniform, using it in the Pacific Theater. The uniform was also worn by the Marines in other campaigns, notably the Battle of Tarawa.

In the European Theater, during the summer of 1944, certain Army infantry units were issued the uniform, like the 41st Armored Infantry Regiment of the 2nd Armored Division.

By January 1944, production of the pattern was stopped. The uniforms were later sold as military surplus. Surplus uniforms became popular among hunters, which led to the common alternate nickname duck hunter camo.

=== Later use ===
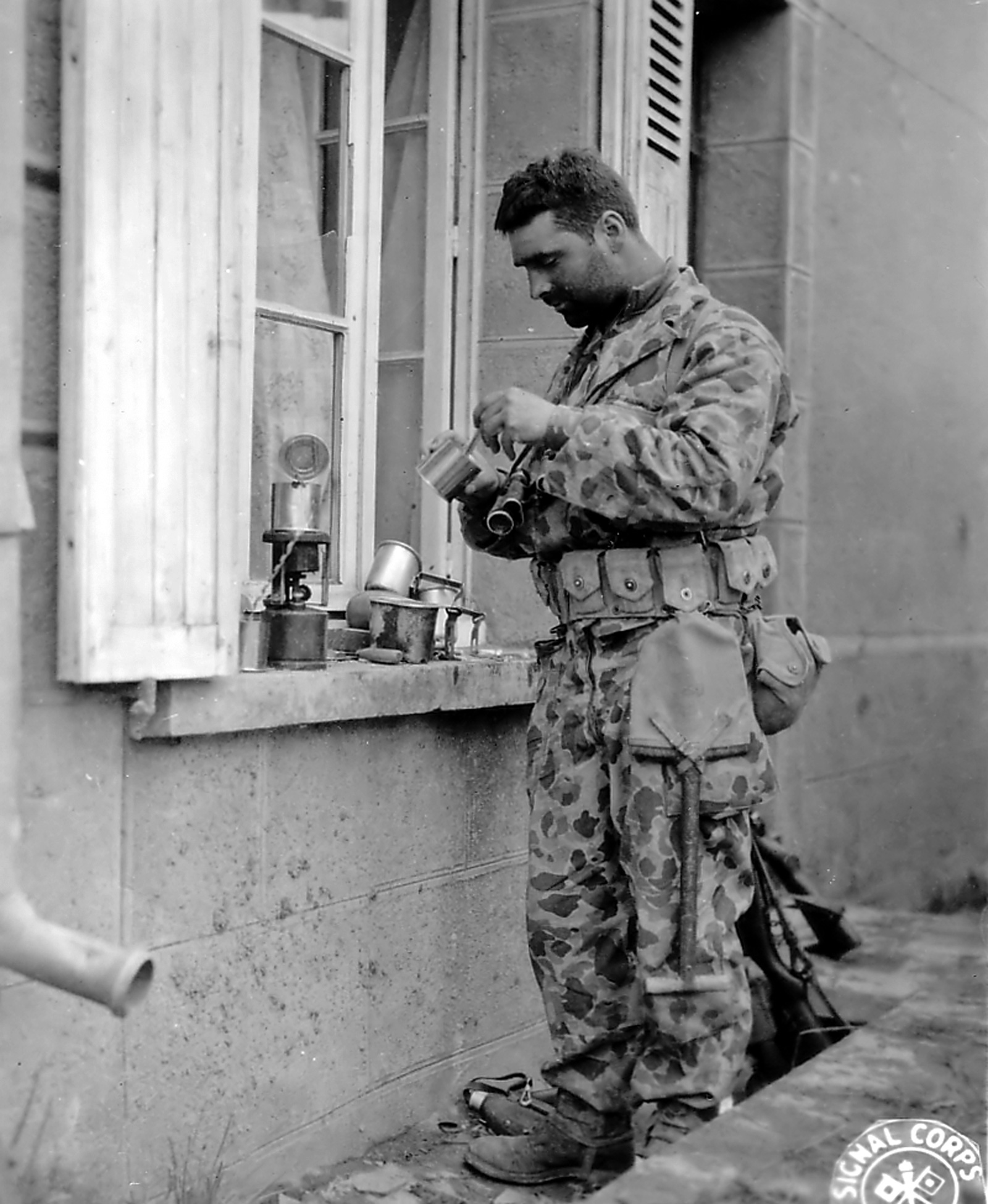
A private of the 41st Armored Infantry Regiment wearing the two piece herringbone twill (HBT) camouflage in Normandy. July 1944

The United States Marine Corps revived the pattern during the Korean War for limited use as helmet covers.

The frog skin pattern was issued to France's 1st Foreign Parachute Regiment and 2nd Foreign Parachute Regiment during the First Indochina War.

In 1961, the Cuban exiles Brigade 2506 were issued the frog skin pattern by the Central Intelligence Agency (CIA) for the Bay of Pigs Invasion.

During the Vietnam War, United States Special Forces issued frog skin to the Montagnard for their guerrilla warfare activities. Navy SEALs and Rangers resorted to using the camo due to a lack of a standard camouflage. Army Special Forces advisers, sailors and marines attached to the Military Assistance Command Vietnam — Naval Advisory Group and the CIDG also used it before tiger stripe camouflage uniforms were issued.

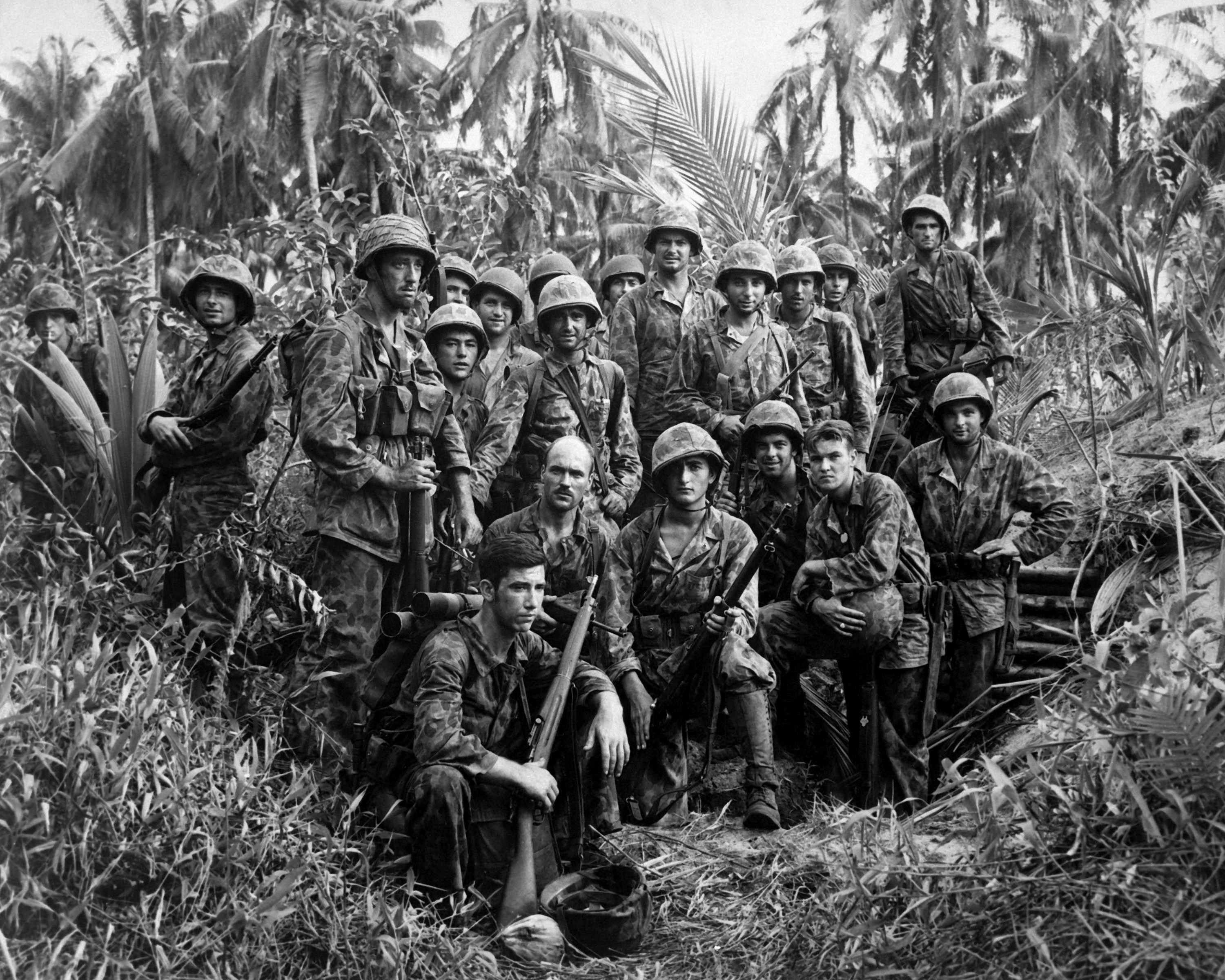
Marine Raiders in frog skin pattern uniforms

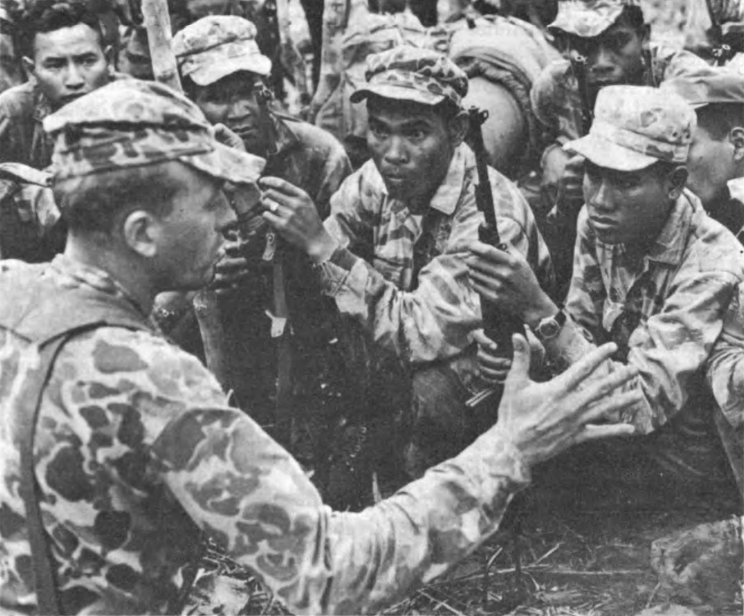
SAF adviser briefing a Montagnard strike force wearing frog skin

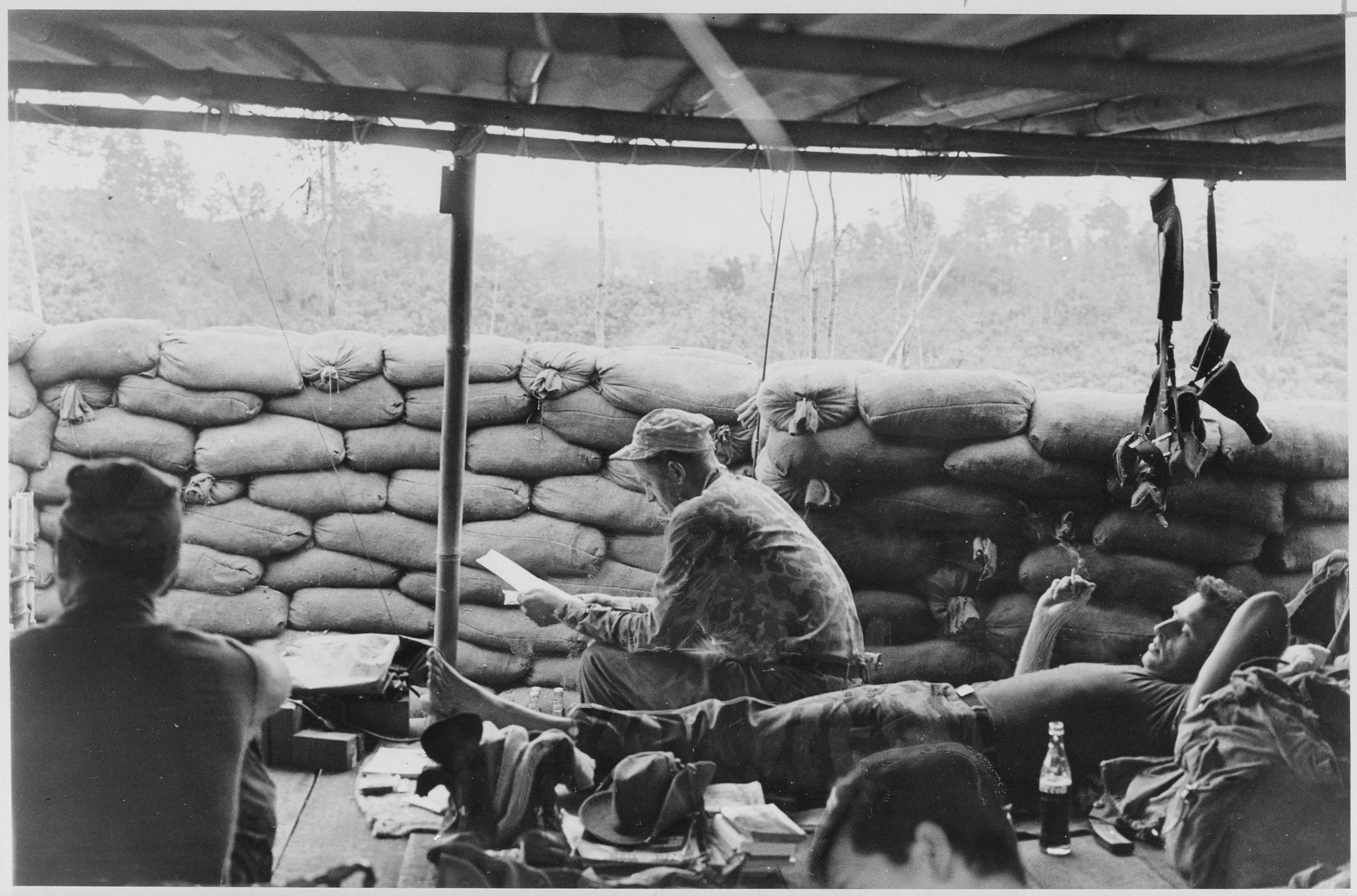
SF advisor to Montagnards relaxing

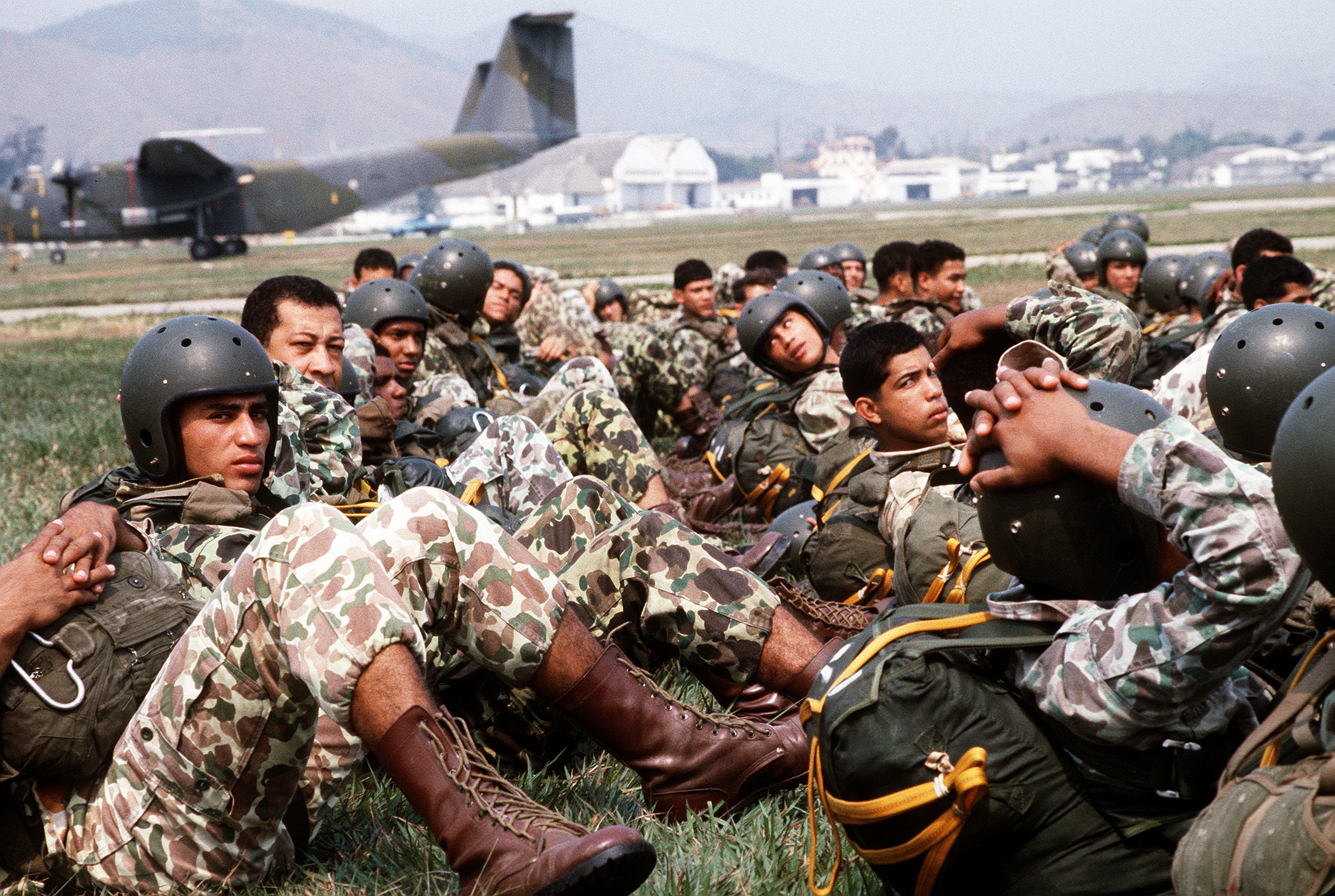
Braziian paratroopers during a forced rest before a joint US exercise wearing camuflagem bolinhas while waiting to board a plane

== Users ==
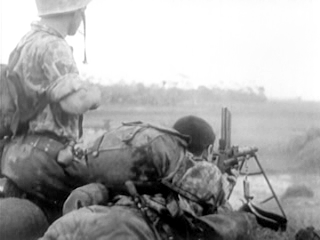
French troops in Indochina 1953

- Biafra: Acquired frog skin uniforms in 1968 for Biafran soldiers. Pro-Biafran mercenaries recruited also use the same camos.
- Brazil: Called camuflagem bolinhas
- Chile: Wore camouflage patterns based on frog skin.
- Colombia: Used by the Colombian National Army from 1960 to 1990.
- France: 1st Foreign Parachute Regiment and 2nd Foreign Parachute Regiment in First Indochina War.
- Indonesia:
  - Brimob forces wore copies based on the US from 1965.
  - Pasukan Gerak Tjepat and Resimen Para Komando Angkatan Darat commandos wore copies based on the M1942 pattern. Original 1942 camo uniforms were used back in the 1950s by PGT/RPKAD and airborne troops from 1954 to 1960, worn with the green pattern visible.
- Iran: Copies, called Panther, were worn by the Iranian military and Revolutionary Guard especially during the Iran-Iraq War.
- Mexico: Copies worn by the Mexican military.
- Netherlands
- Philippines: Used by Scout Ranger units in the Philippine Army and Constabulary.
- United States:
  - United States Marine Corps
    - Marine Raiders
  - Brigade 2506
- Spain: Three-color pattern used in 1970 and was mostly used for ponchos, helmet covers, field equipment and some on clothes.
- Turkey: Formerly used frog skin clones; first examples seen in the 1970s.

== Bibliography ==
- Conboy, Ken (2007). ELITE: The Special Forces of Indonesia 1950-2008. Equinox Publishing. ISBN 978-9793780603.
- Javier, Pedro Antonio V. (2024). Evolution of Filipino Camouflage 1899-2024.
- Jowett, Philip (2016). Modern African Wars (5): The Nigerian-Biafran War 1967–70. Osprey Publishing. ISBN 978-1472816092.
- Larson, Eric H. (2021). Camouflage: International Ground Force Patterns, 1946–2017. Barnsley: Pen & Sword. ISBN 9781526739537.
