= U.S. Woodland =

1980s military camouflage pattern

- Digitized swatch of the U.S. Woodland pattern
- Type: Military camouflage pattern
- Place of origin: United States

Service history
- In service: 1981–2012 (U.S. military); 2006–present (MARSOC)
- Used by: See Users (for other non-U.S. users)
- Wars: Invasion of Grenada; United States invasion of Panama; Lebanese Civil War; Somali Civil War; Colombian conflict Yugoslav Wars; Operation Uphold Democracy; Second Chechen War; War in Afghanistan; Iraq War; 2006 Lebanon War; Mexican drug war 2008 Cambodian-Thai stand-off Russo-Georgian War; Libyan civil war (2011); Syrian Civil War; Russo-Ukrainian War; 2025 Cambodia–Thailand border conflict

Production history
- Produced: 1980–present

U.S. Woodland was the former standard issue camouflage pattern of the United States Armed Forces from 1981 to 2012 in the cut of the Battle Dress Uniform and a dozen other pieces of clothing that were issued, until its replacement in the early 2010s. It is a four color, high contrast disruptive pattern with irregular markings in green, brown, sand and black. It is also known unofficially by its colloquial moniker of "M81" after the year of its adoption, however this term was never officially used by the U.S. military.

Although BDUs have been long phased out of frontline use in the U.S. Armed Forces, U.S. Woodland is still used on some limited level since MOPP suits, vests, and other equipment were printed in it and never fully replaced. Some modernized uniforms such as modified BDUs and FROG gear were used by special forces such as the USMC Forces Special Operations Command and United States Navy SEALs.

== Development and history ==
The woodland pattern is similar to the brown-dominant version of the ERDL pattern used during the Vietnam War, only differing in that it is enlarged by 60 percent and the shades adjusted for contrast. The changes were made in order to extend the effectiveness of the camouflage pattern to as close to 350 meters as possible.

The enlargement of the pattern was made as part of a shift of tactical focus of the United States military from the close-range fighting of Vietnam to planning for potential longer-range fighting across European woodlands.

The US Woodland pattern was printed slightly darker than ERDL for two key reasons. First, the chosen colors complemented the pattern sizing, preventing the visual blending of colors at greater distances and enhancing the effectiveness of the pattern. Also, by starting with slightly darker colors, the eventual fading of the fabric through use and washing would result in colors moving closer to the desired target, thereby prolonging the garment's useful life.

It is not labeled as NIR compliant, but testing done on the material and dyes used in the creation process found it to be effective in camouflaging under infrared light.

== Usage ==
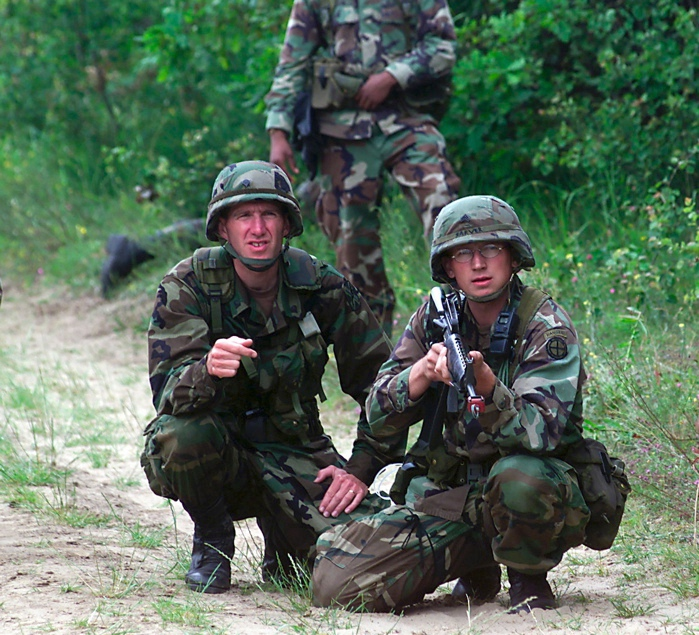
U.S. Army National Guardsmen on an exercise in 2000 while wearing Woodland BDUs and PASGT helmets

=== U.S. Army ===
In the U.S. Army, the woodland-patterned Battle Dress Uniform was replaced by the digital Universal Camouflage Pattern (UCP) found on the Army Combat Uniform, introduced in 2005. UCP itself was replaced by the Operational Camouflage Pattern (OCP) in 2019. The pattern is still found on MOPP suits and some older models of body armor yet to be retired, such as PASGT vests and Interceptor Body Armor.

=== U.S. Navy ===
The U.S. Navy no longer uses the Woodland pattern. Most of the Navy has transitioned to the Navy Working Uniform, which uses digital patterns in either a woodland colorway (NWU Type III) or, for some deployed tactical units only, a desert version (Type II).

=== U.S. Marines ===
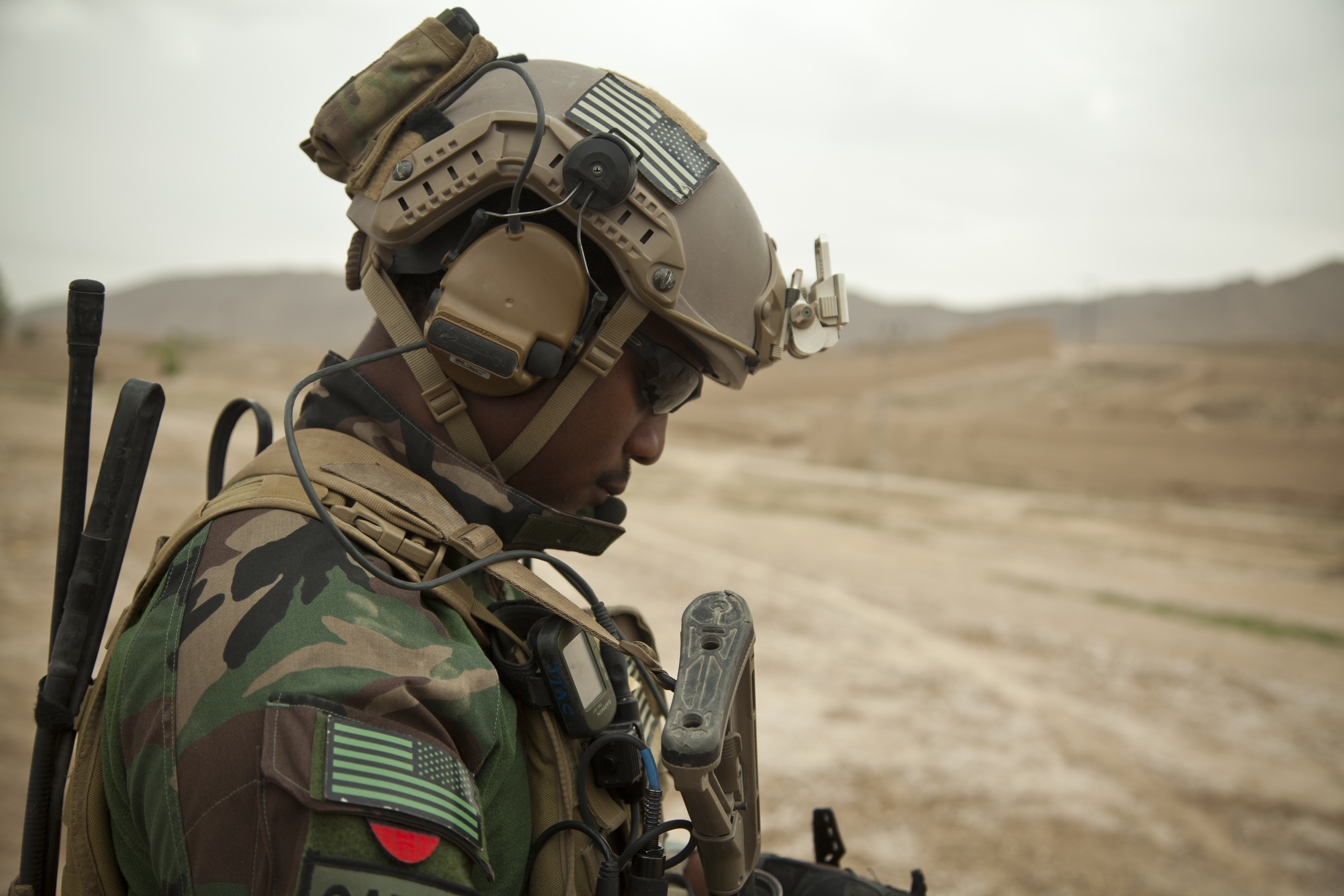
A Marine Raider wearing a FAST Maritime combat helmet and M81 camouflage combat uniform

The Woodland Pattern BDU was phased out by the Marine Corps with the introduction of the digital MARPAT Marine Corps Combat Utility Uniform in 2002, although it was reintroduced for the United States Marine Corps Forces Special Operations Command in 2011 and was also worn by MARSOC forces in the War in Afghanistan.

=== U.S. Air Force ===
The Air Force phased out the woodland pattern battle dress uniform in 2011 when they went to the Airman Battle Uniform (ABU) which used a pixelated version of the tiger stripe pattern. It was in turn replaced by the Army's OCP by 2021. The Civil Air Patrol, the U.S. Air Force's civilian auxiliary, also used woodland patterned BDUs until being discontinued 15 June 2021.

=== State defense forces ===
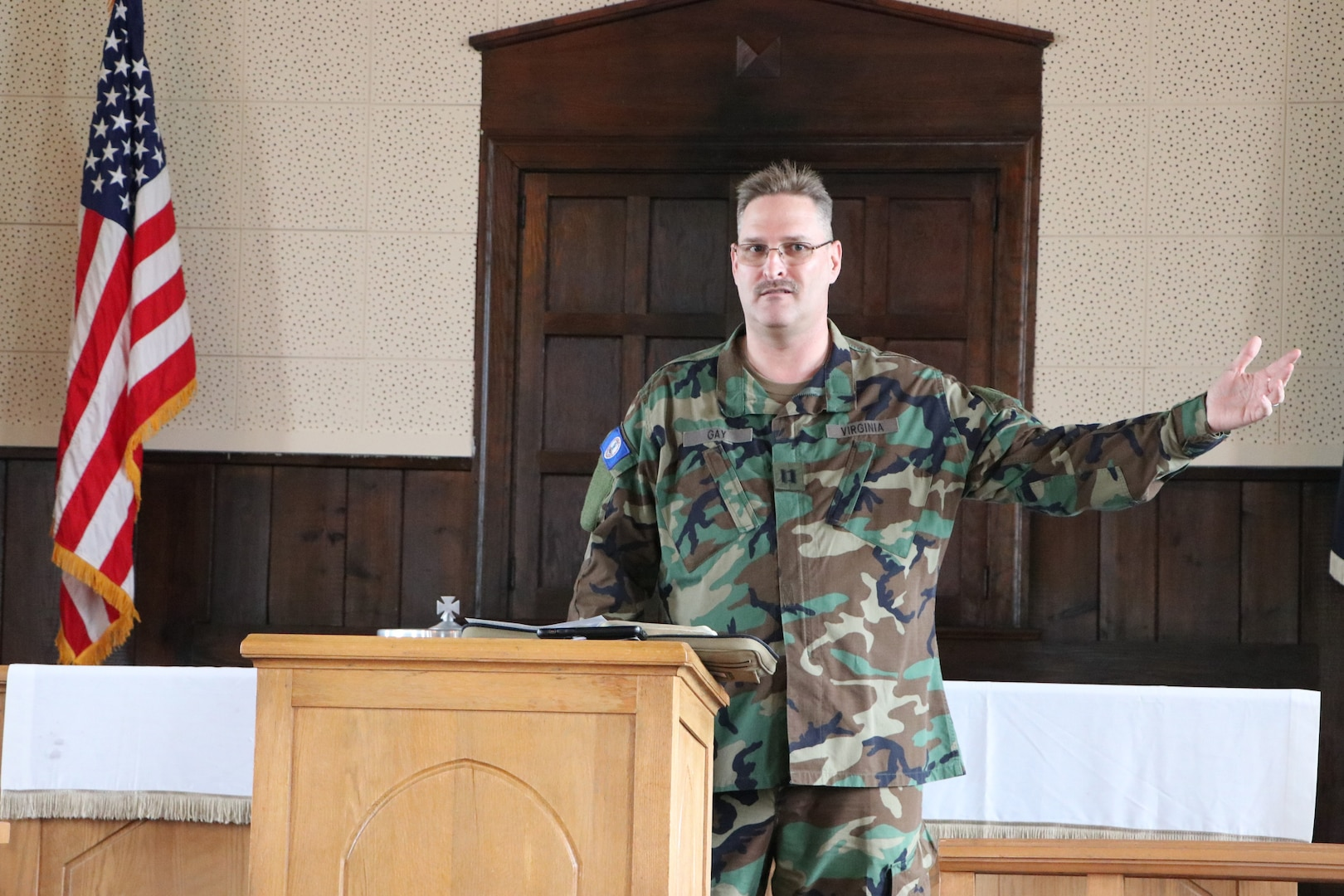
Captain Gay of the Virginia Defense Force wearing ACU pattern woodland camouflage.

Several state defense forces use the Woodland Pattern on their BDUs. Members of the Virginia Defense Force wear a Woodland version of the Army Combat Uniform (ACU).

=== Law enforcement ===
The pattern also sees use among police departments, such as the Rhode Island State Police.

== Users ==
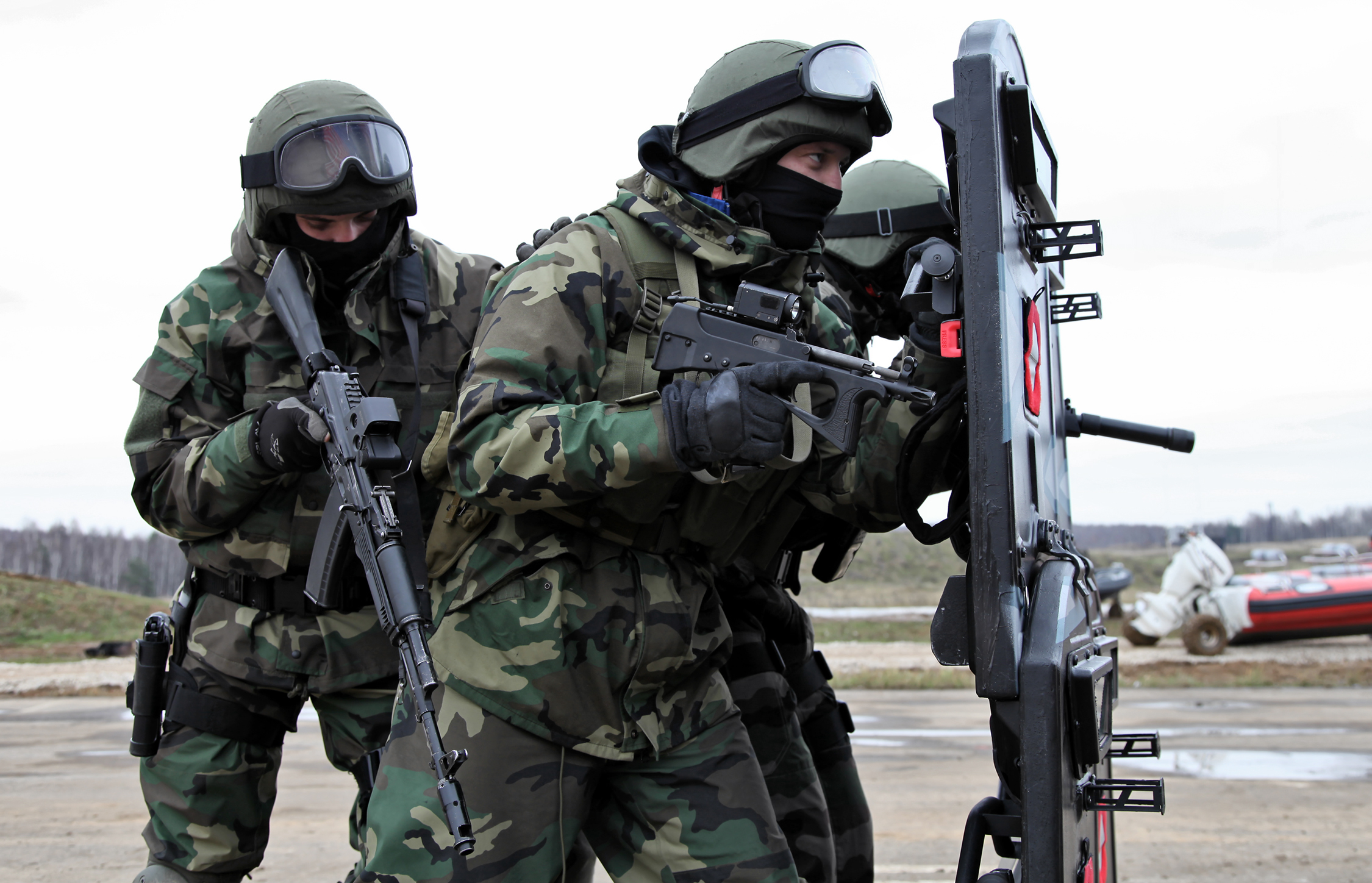
Russian Internal Troops wearing LES, a Russian camouflage pattern similar to the woodland camouflage

- Afghanistan: Taliban used copies and US made uniforms circa 1996 to 2001 before the invasion of Afghanistan. Uniform copies and US uniforms used by Taliban during insurgency period. After 2021 takeover woodlands continued to use by Islamic National Army.
- Argentina: Clones made for Argentine military.
- Armenia: Adopted an Armenian-made Woodland pattern.
- Azerbaijan: Used by State Border Service of Azerbaijan.
- Bangladesh: Used Woodland uniforms with bright yellow patterns.
- Bhutan
- Bolivia
- Bosnia and Herzegovina
  - Republika Srpska: Used by the RS' Special Anti-Terrorist Unit.
- Cambodia: Used Cambodian-made Woodland uniforms.
- Chad
- Chile
- Colombia
  - FARC
- Congo-Brazzaville
- Congo-Kinshasa
- Côte d'Ivoire
- Croatia
- Cyprus: Used by Cypriot special forces.
- Egypt
- El Salvador
- Estonia
- Fiji: Woodland camo used by some Fijian military units.
- Gambia
- Greece: Used by Underwater Demolition Command.
- Grenada: Used by the SSU.
- Guatemala
- Haiti: Used by the Armed Forces of Haiti, as of January 2024.
- Honduras
- Hong Kong – Used by the Hong Kong Police tactical unit (SDU)
- Israel: Used by Israeli military in unofficial capacity.
- Kyrgyzstan: Asian-made Woodland patterns used in the Kyrgyz military.
- Kuwait: Used by the Kuwait National Guard.
- Liberia
- Lithuania – Used by the Lithuanian Riflemen's Union
- Luxembourg
- Malaysia: Clones used by PASKAL commandos.
- Mexico
- Moldova – Worn by Army of the Republic of Moldova.
- Montenegro: Used by the Montenegrin Special Anti-Terrorist Unit.
- North Korea: Reported to be used by North Korean soldiers stationed in the DMZ from 2010.
- Philippines: Woodland uniforms and gear sometimes used in the AFP.
- Russia: Russia uses near-copies (Komplekt kamuflirovannogo obmundirovannogo [KKO] and Лес or Les [forest]) and true copies (HATO), English NATO, worn by MVD Agencies such as the Internal Troops and Spetsnaz GRU units.
- Saint Kitts and Nevis: Used by Saint Kitts and Nevis Defence Force
- Saudi Arabia: Used by the Royal Saudi Air Force.
- Somalia
- South Korea: Initially in the early to mid-1980s several local variations were produced in limited amounts and used by certain units in the ROKA and the ROKMC. In 1990 the Republic of Korea Armed Forces introduced a locally produced version based on US woodland (Tonghab Korean: 통합) across all branches, which was the standard issue pattern for uniforms, vests, webbing and helmet covers until 2010 when it began to be replaced by digital patterns Granite B for ROKA and ROKN, digital "tiger stripe" style camouflage pattern, known as 물결무늬 (Wave pattern) - aka WAVEPAT - or 해병 디지털 (Marine digital) for ROKMC and Doksa (독사 or "venomous snake") for ROK-SWC due to reports of North Korea issuing copies of Woodland, however the woodland pattern still continues to see limited use.
- Sri Lanka
- Tonga
- Thailand
- Turkey
- Ukraine: Blue Woodland camos used by MVS units. State Border Guard personnel use green woodland clones.
- United States: Still used by MARSOC, Marine Raiders and Navy SEALs. At the state-level, several state defense forces use it.
- Vietnam

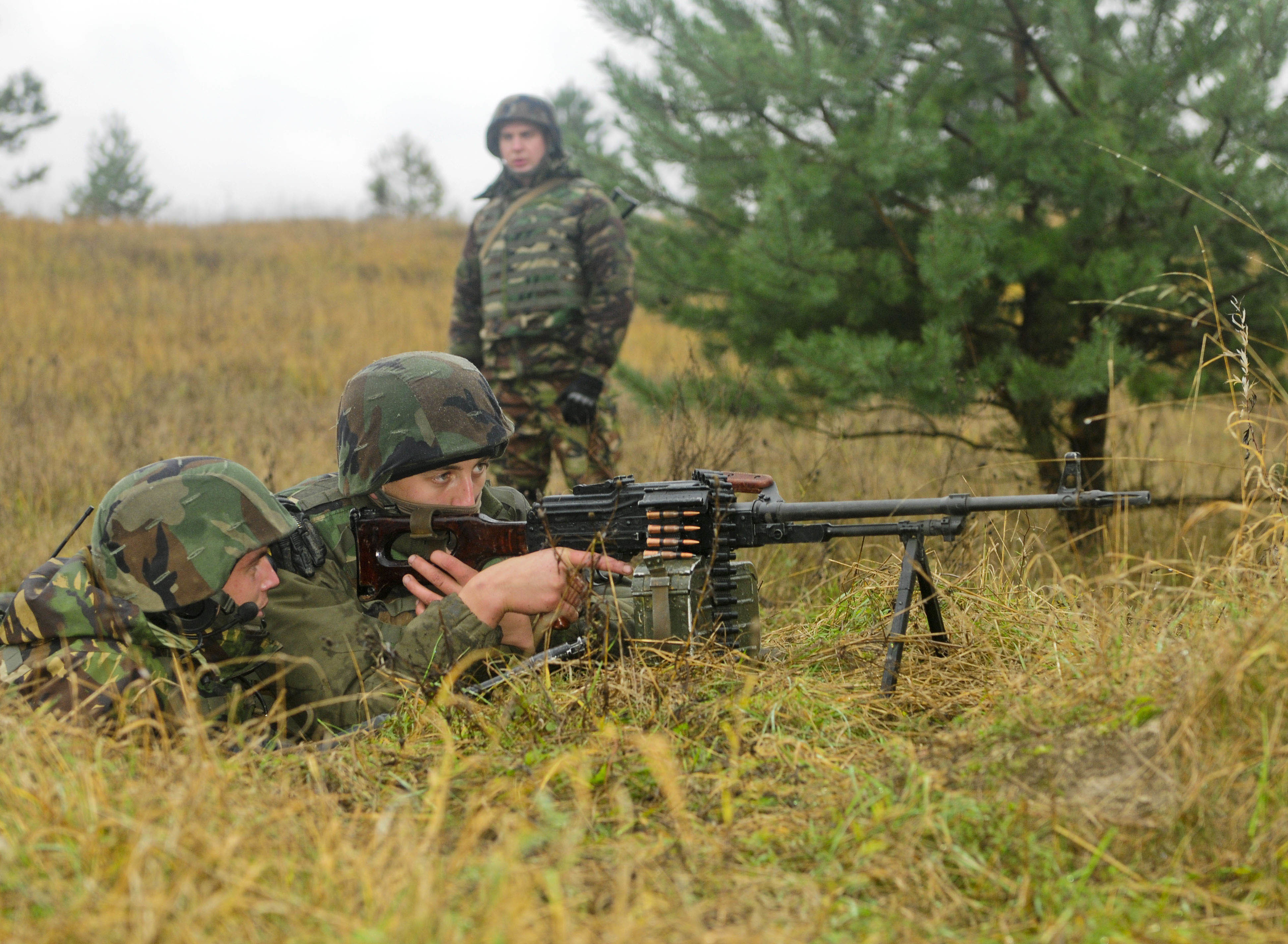
Ukrainian National Guard soldiers wearing woodland uniforms in 2015

=== Former users ===
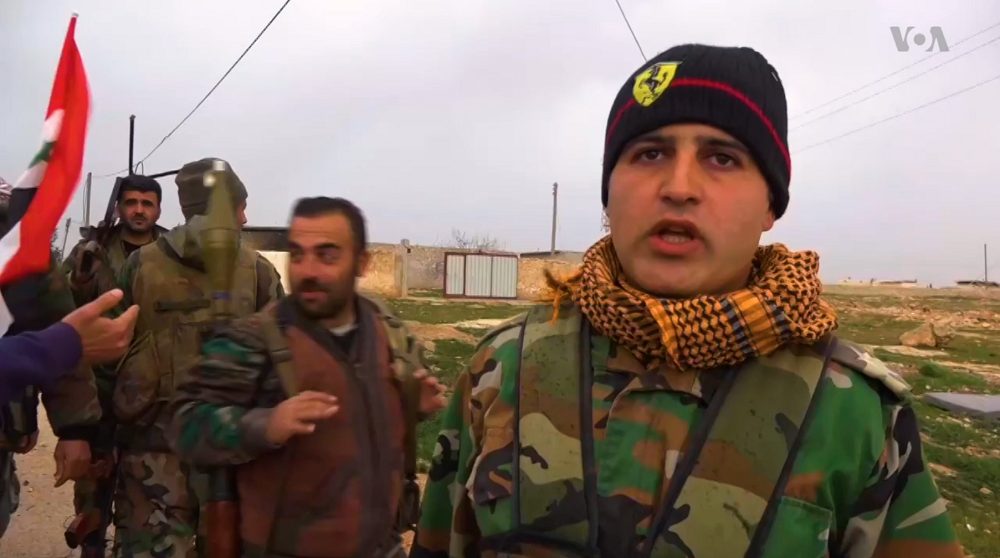
- Syrian Army soldiers wearing woodland-pattern uniforms in 2017
  Islamic Republic of Afghanistan: Formerly used by Afghan National Army as standard issue uniforms, both locally produced and sourcing US surplus uniforms and foreign clones, before switching to Spec4ce Camouflage
- Australia: Formerly used by OPFOR in training during the 1990s and 2000s.
- Azerbaijan: Obtained Turkish-made Woodland uniforms and used from around 2000–12.
- Canada: Formerly used by the Canadian Forces as the pattern of helmet covers for the M1 Helmet (both regular and paratrooper variants), the PASGT Helmet and the Spectra Helmet otherwise known as the 'Barrday Helmet'. The Woodland pattern had originally entered service around the same time as the US and had become the standard issue cover by the late 1980s, replacing the older Mitchell Pattern covers. The cover pattern was fully phased out and replaced by CADPAT by the mid-2000s. Helmet covers as well as uniforms (like former US BDUs) and webbing equipment are still seen in Woodland pattern for OPFOR training.
- Chechen Republic of Ichkeria: Sourced from Afghanistan, used in combat during the Second Chechen War.
- Colombia: Formerly used by the National Army of Colombia, used until 1991 and replaced in 2006.
- Costa Rica: Formerly used by the Costa Rican Civil Guard.
- Germany: Used by Kommando Spezialkräfte Marine in 1990s.
- Georgia: Former standard issue camouflage pattern of the Georgian Armed Forces, replaced in 2007.
- Iraq: Formerly used by reformed post-2003 Iraqi military.
  - Kurdistan: Used by Peshmerga.
- Latvia: Worn by the Latvian Land Forces from 1992 to 2007 when the M07 LATPAT camo was issued.
- Lebanon: Replaced in 2017 by the Operational Camouflage Pattern
- Netherlands: Worn by the Royal Netherlands Marine Corps, most of the Woodland camos being replaced by Dutch-made fractal camo.
- Nigeria: Used by the Nigerian military until they were replaced by the M14 pattern.
- Ba'athist Syria: Copies made for the Syrian military.
- United States: Former standard issue camouflage uniform pattern for all branches of the U.S. Armed Forces.

== See also ==
- ERDL pattern

== Bibliography ==
- Galeotti, Mark (2015). Spetsnaz: Russia's Special Forces. Osprey Publishing. ISBN 978-1472807229.
- Javier, Pedro Antonio V. (2024). Evolution of Filipino Camouflage 1899-2024.
- Larson, Eric H. (2021). Camouflage: International Ground Force Patterns, 1946–2017. Barnsley: Pen & Sword. ISBN 9781526739537.
