= Rhodesian Brushstroke =

Camouflage pattern

Rhodesian Brushstroke pattern
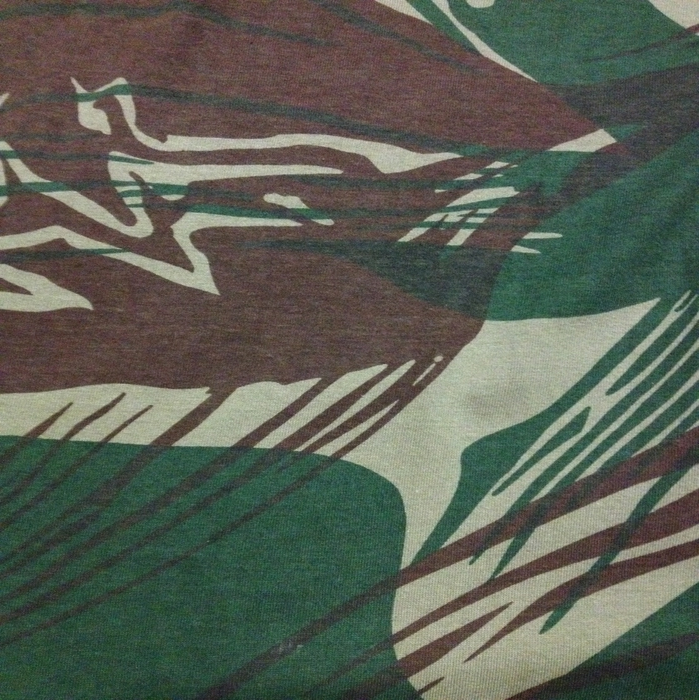
- Rhodesian Brushstroke pattern.
- Type: Military camouflage pattern
- Place of origin: Rhodesia

Service history
- In service: 1963–1980 (Rhodesian service)
- Used by: See Users
- Wars: Rhodesian Bush War; Mozambican Civil War; Second Congo War

Production history
- Designer: Di Cameron
- Manufacturer: David Whitehead Textiles (Original)
- Produced: 1965-Present

The Rhodesian Brushstroke is a brushstroke-type camouflage pattern used by the Rhodesian Security Forces from 1963 until its replacement by a vertical lizard stripe in 1980.

It was the default camouflage appearing on battledress of the Rhodesian Army and British South Africa Police, although used in smaller quantities by INTAF personnel. The design was also used on uniforms issued to South African Special Forces for clandestine operations. A similar pattern is fielded by the Zimbabwe National Army.

== Development and history ==
Rhodesian Brushstroke is similar to the United Kingdom's Disruptive Pattern Material (DPM). It consists of large, contrasting, shapes tailored to break up the outline of an object. Like most disruptive camouflage, the pattern is dependent on countershading, utilising hues with high-intensity contrast or noticeable differences in chromaticity.

Prior to Rhodesia's Unilateral Declaration of Independence, enlisted personnel in the Rhodesian Army were issued with uniforms in khaki drill. The Battle of Sinoia and the outbreak of the Rhodesian Bush War prompted the security forces to devise a more appropriate uniform especially designed for the region. This incorporated a three colour, high contrast, disruptive fabric with green and brown strokes on a sandy background. Early shortages of textile and equipment were overcome with South African and Portuguese technical assistance, and a home industry for the new battledress developed. The pattern was designed by Di Cameron of David Whitehead Textiles.

== Users ==
=== Rhodesia ===
The basic Rhodesian military battledress adopted universally between 1964 and 1966 consisted of a camouflage jacket, field cap, and trousers with wide belt loops for a stable belt and large cargo pockets. Ranks, name tapes, or unit patches were sewn on. In 1969, the jackets were largely superseded by shirts of a lighter material for combat operations in the hot African climate. Late in the bush war, Rhodesian battledress commonly took the form of one-piece coveralls, but uniform regulations remained quite lax in the field. Individual servicemen often modified their uniforms to shorten the sleeves while others wore privately purchased T-shirts with the same camouflage print. The long camouflage trousers were also discarded in large numbers in favour of running shorts.

While the brushstroke pattern itself was considered very effective, the fabric in locally made uniforms was of poor quality and the Rhodesian troops frequently envied foreign volunteers who brought their more durable foreign-produced clothing with them.

=== Zimbabwe ===
The Zimbabwe Defence Forces initially discarded its preexisting stocks of Rhodesian battledress in favour of a Portuguese-designed vertical lizardstripe during the 1980s; however, the original brushstroke pattern was re-adopted during the 1990s just prior to the Second Congo War. Zimbabwe currently produces military uniforms in two variations of Rhodesian Brushstroke designed for the dry season and rainy season, respectively. The dry season variant uses a light khaki base while the rainy season variant is designed on a green base.

=== South Africa ===
During the late 1970s, South African pilots, technical personnel, and special forces frequently operated alongside the Rhodesian security forces. Due to the covert nature of their presence, they were forbidden from wearing their regulation uniforms and instead issued with Rhodesian battledress. South African units known to have received stocks of Rhodesian uniforms included 3 South African Infantry Battalion and 1 Parachute Battalion. South African special forces also wore Rhodesian battledress during raids in Mozambique during the Mozambican Civil War. This practice was largely discontinued following Zimbabwean independence in 1980. The Rhodesian battledress did continue to be issued to ex-Rhodesian service members serving with South African special forces units operating in Zimbabwe between 1981 and 1984.

=== Non-state actors ===
Pilfered Rhodesian fatigues occasionally turned up in the hands of the Zimbabwe People's Revolutionary Army (ZIPRA), which used it to impersonate members of the Rhodesian security forces. Prior to standardising its uniforms during the mid-1970s, the People's Armed Forces for the Liberation of Angola (FAPLA) also adopted Rhodesian battledress uniforms in limited quantities.

=== Trials ===
While developing a new disruptive camouflage pattern in the 2000, the United States Marine Corps (USMC) evaluated Rhodesian Brushstroke as one of the three best military camouflage patterns previously developed, along with Canadian Pattern (CADPAT) and tigerstripe. None of the three patterns were adopted because the USMC desired a more distinctive design.

== See also ==
- Denison smock
- Lizard (camouflage)
- Tiger stripe camouflage

== Bibliography ==
- Hutcheson, Thomas (2000). "SAAF (1978–1980) Waterkloof (Military Transport Workshop) – Rhodesia – Camps". Newcastle upon Tyne: Sentinel Projects. Archived from the original on 27 January 2015.
- "Camouflage Facts". Birmingham: Delta Gear Inc. 2012. Archived from the original on 27 January 2015.
- Jackson, Jackie (October 2021). "The CQ Store" (PDF). Mount Maunganui: Rhodesian Services Association. Archived from the original (PDF) on 14 November 2024.
- Stiff, Peter (2000) [1999]. The Silent War: South African Recce Operations 1969–1994. Alberton: Galago. ISBN 978-0620243001.
- Abbot, Peter (February 2014). Modern African Wars: The Congo 1960–2002. Oxford: Osprey Publishing. ISBN 978-1782000761.
- Baumbach, Johannes (2012). Sparks, Emma (ed.). Advances in Military Textiles and Personal Equipment. Cambridge: Woodhead Publishing. ISBN 978-1845696993.
- Ambush Valley Games, (various) (May 2012). Bush Wars: Africa 1960–2010. Oxford: Osprey Publishing. ISBN 978-1849087698.
- Shortt, James (2003) [1981]. The Special Air Service. Oxford: Osprey Publishing. ISBN 978-0850453966.
- Grant, Neil (2014). Cowper, Marcus (ed.). Rhodesian Light Infantryman 1961–80. Oxford: Osprey Publishing. ISBN 978-1472809629.
- Cocks, Chris (June 2009) [1988]. Fireforce: One Man's War in the Rhodesian Light Infantry (Fourth ed.). Johannesburg: 30° South Publishers. ISBN 978-0-9584890-9-6.
- Petter-Bowyer, P. J. H. (November 2005) [2003]. Winds of Destruction: the Autobiography of a Rhodesian Combat Pilot. Johannesburg: 30° South Publishers. ISBN 978-0-9584890-3-4.
- Venter, Al J. (2013). Portugal's Guerrilla Wars in Africa: Lisbon's Three Wars in Angola, Mozambique and Portuguese Guinea 1961–74. Solihull: Helion and Company. ISBN 978-1909384576.
- Scholtz, Leopold (2013). The SADF in the Border War 1966–1989. Cape Town: Tafelberg. ISBN 978-0-624-05410-8.
- Stiff, Peter (2002). Cry Zimbabwe: Independence Twenty Years on. Alberton: Galago. ISBN 978-1919854021.
