= Maharishi (brand) =

British company

Maharishi is a London based company founded in 1994 by Hardy Blechman. The company uses natural fibres and up-cycled army issued clothing for collections.

== History ==
Hardy Blechman began his career buying and selling military surplus before founding Maharishi in 1994. Blechman won the British Fashion Council's Streetwear Designer of the Year Award in 2000, because of the popularity of Maharishi's sports and military products. The company's first flagship store was opened in central London in 2001.

In 2004, Maharishi published Hardy Blechman's DPM: Disruptive Pattern Material, a 944 page camouflage encyclopaedia. The book charts the history of camouflage from its roots in nature, to its adoption by the military, and onto its current popularity and use within art and fashion. In a 2013 Complex magazine story listing "triple OG labels that are still slaying the competition," Maharishi is cited as "knowing more about camo than the Pentagon."

== Production ==
=== Snopants ===
One of Maharishi's signatures, the Snopants, began as an upcycled version of the U.S. Army "Snow Camouflage Over Trousers". Maharishi altered the silhouette and fabrication while often adding embroideries, which made the Snopants a coveted item among celebrities and streetwear enthusiasts. In their millennial round up Arena Magazine described Snopants as "the most copied pants of the decade".

=== Upcycling ===
Maharishi was founded "with the intention to offer environmentally sound hemp and upcycled military & industrial surplus", according to Hardy Blechman. Their collections regularly include repurposed garments such as U.S. army liners and flight jackets, Italian military surplus knits, and Austrian M65 jackets, as well as vintage silk Kimonos.

=== Hemp and Natural Fibres ===
Maharishi produces its garments with natural fibres like hemp fabric and organic cotton. Founder Blechman also developed the first waterproof hemp fabric with the Italian mill ITS Artea.
