= Windproof smock =

Garment that protects from cold wind

Windproof smocks are clothing for the upper part of the body. They usually come with hoods and matching trousers worn as over garments to prevent cold air, and in some cases water, passing through.

== Examples ==
A garment with a similar appearance and colours to the Denison Smock, in lighter-weight denim, the 1942 Pattern Smock, Windproof, was also commonly issued to scouts and snipers in infantry battalions, from 1943, but most notably the SAS/SBS/SOE and Commando squads. It is sometimes incorrectly referred to as the "SAS Windproof". It was not designed much for parachuting, and lacked a crotch flap, having a drawstring hem instead. The most distinctive point of difference between 'Windproofs' and the Denison smock are that the former are hooded. A matching set of over-trousers was produced to complement the smock. Both items were screen printed with colour-fast pigments in a bold splinter design, with colours similar to that of the Denison.

Variations of the 'Windproof' have been the basic Special Forces smock until the present, with several alternative colours seen over the years - white (or at least natural cotton) for LRDG's desert use; olive green; black; and, in now very rare later issues of the Smock, Windproof, 1963 Pattern, the Disruptive Pattern Material (DPM) introduced in the late 1960s. The current issue Windproof Smock is in the latest MTP camouflage design.

The camouflage pattern of the "SAS Windproof" was used as the basis of the post World War II Belgian Paratrooper Smock with very similar overtrousers.

=== SOE Jumpsuit ===
A camouflaged overall garment in a similar camouflage pattern along with a matching cloth helmet were issued to the SOE and allied agents parachuting into occupied Europe and were discarded shortly after descent. The "striptease suit" came with a side shovel pocket, pistol holster, knife pouch on cuff and parallel zips for instant removal of garment. SOE jumpsuits were also issued in white for winter/arctic environments.

=== DPM Windproof Smock ===
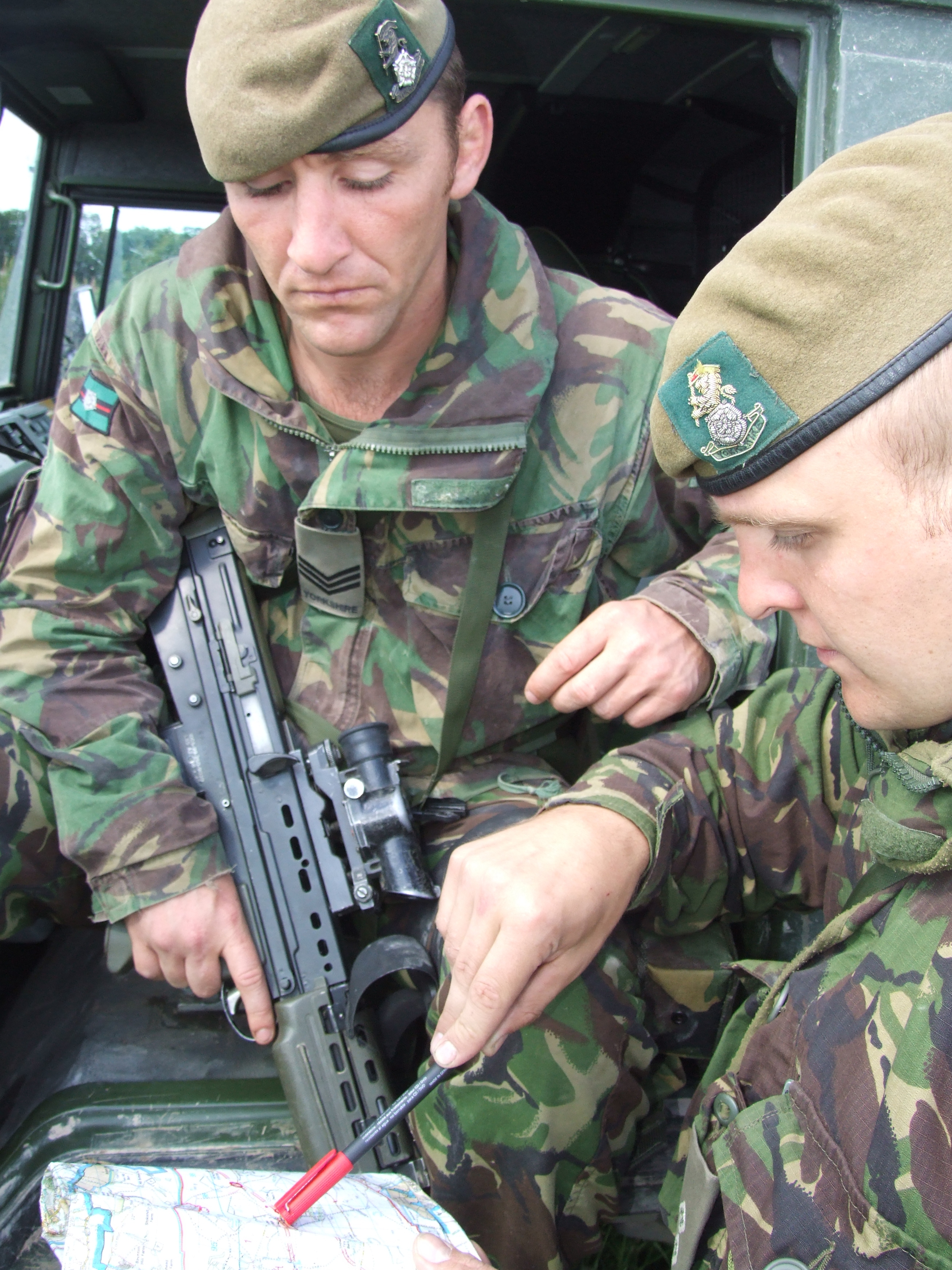
Soldier of the 2nd Battalion Yorkshire Regiment wearing Smock Windproof DPM and trousers, temperate pattern.

The Smock, Windproof, DPM (or DPM Windproof Smock) was issued alongside the standard DPM Combat Jackets by the British Army. The Special Air Service Regiment was the first unit to adopt its own design of DPM Windproof Smock which it wore in preference to the 68 Pattern and later combat jackets. Aside from being made from a windproof material, it differed from the standard combat jackets in being cut to fit more loosely, allowing it to fit over other layers of clothing more easily, and in having an integral hood. Where the standard jackets were closed by a full-length zipper, covered by a buttoned flap, and buttoned cuffs, the windproof smock used velcro to close the flap over the zipper and to fasten the cuffs. The buttons fitted to the Windproof Smock (on the four, expanding front pockets, and the small arm pocket for the First Field Dressing) were all of an overlarge type, to ease use by cold or gloved fingers.

Later, a similar DPM Windproof smock was introduced (the Smock, Windproof, Arctic), this was primarily issued to Royal Marine Commandos and Army units assigned to the AMF(L) for arctic warfare. This differed from the Smock, Windproof, DPM in that it had button-on rank tabs on the chest and back, as well as a wire 'stiffener' for the hood. The general issue Combat Soldier 95 combat jacket followed this pattern, but omitting the rank tab on the back which tended to snag on rucksacks, camouflage netting and so forth.

== See also ==
- Uniforms of the British Armed Forces
- Smock Parachutist DPM
