= Smock Parachutist DPM =

The 'Smock, Parachutist DPM', known simply as the Para Smock, was the replacement for the Denison Smock used by the British Army's Parachute Regiment and parachute-trained troops. It was introduced in the mid-1970s, after the British Army's universal adoption of DPM field clothing. While the design was little different from the Denison smock, it was made from a lighter-weight cloth, printed in the then standard Disruptive Pattern Material (DPM).

The Para Smock differs from the three most recent standard patterns of combat jacket, all made from DPM, and is like its Denison predecessor in having no flap to button or velcro over the full length zipper; hip and breast pockets; hem adjustors; and a diaper flap (fastened under the crotch to stop the smock riding up while parachuting) fastened by pres-studs (snaps) (though smaller than on the Denison); and knitted wool cuffs. It is also cut more loosely than the Smock, combat. It lacks the flannel lining on the inside of the collar that the Denison had, and like the standard Smock, combat has a first field dressing pouch on one sleeve (the right), and pen pockets on the other, both closed by buttoned flaps. Like the 1968 Pattern Smock, Combat, it is fitted with three buttons around the outside of the collar, to which a hood can be attached. The hood is DPM, and lined in green. (One is visible in the photograph shown). The Para Smock is standard issue for the Parachute Regiment and other airborne units.

With the introduction of the British Army's latest "Multi-Terrain Pattern" camouflage (MTP), the Para Smock also became available in that pattern and remains on issue with the Parachute Regiment and other airborne units. Outside of airborne units, it is highly sought after not only for its physical qualities, but also as something of a status symbol.

== Images ==
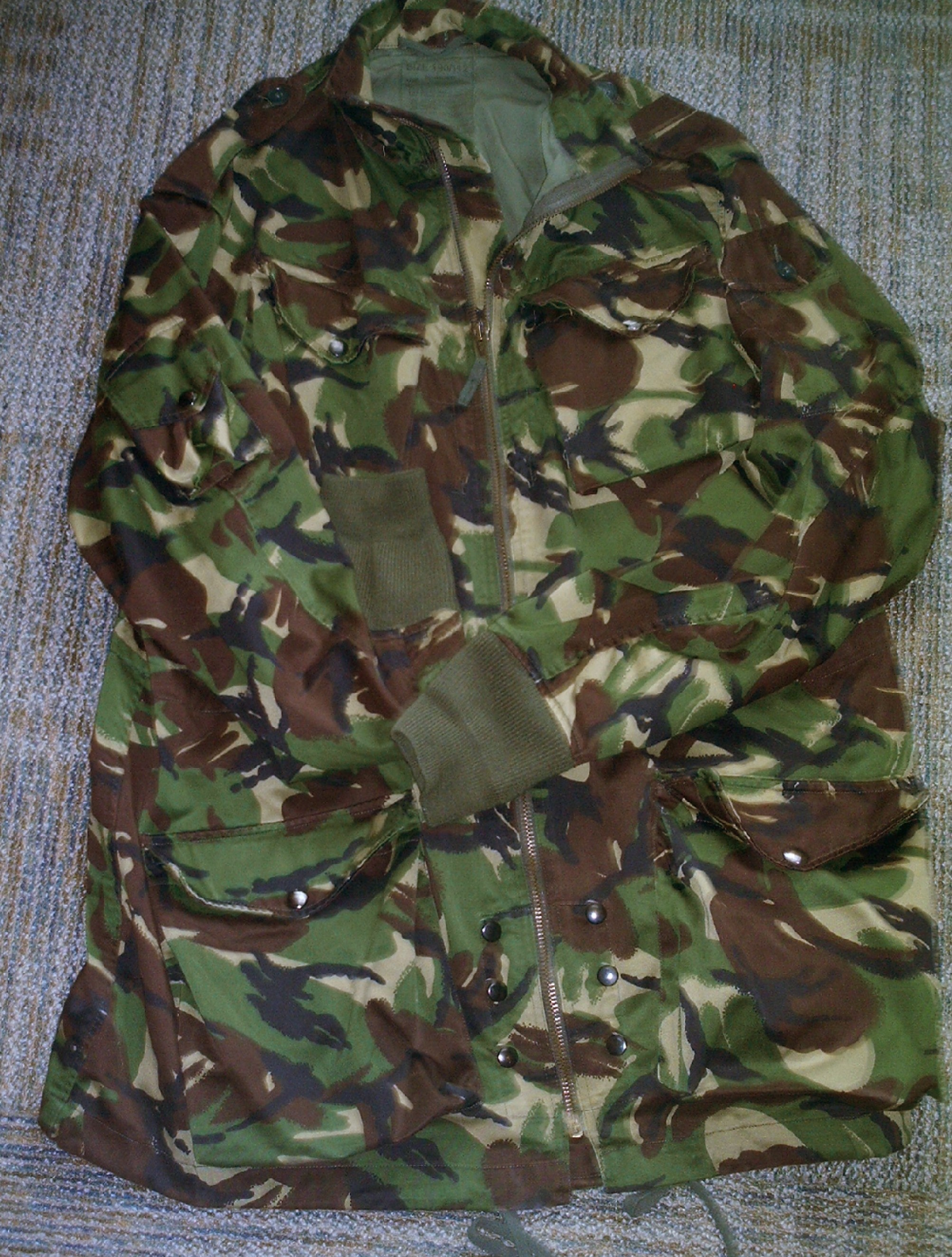
DPM Parachute Smock

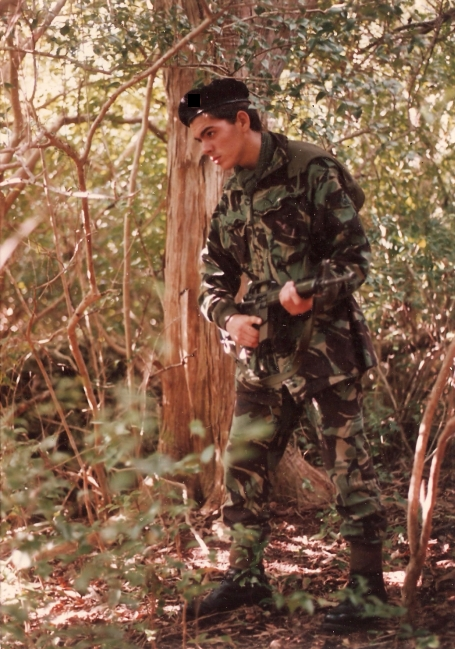
Model wearing a DPM Parachute Smock

== See also ==
- Denison Smock
- Smock Windproof DPM
- British Army Uniform
