= Tiger stripe camouflage =

Type of camouflage pattern

Tiger stripe
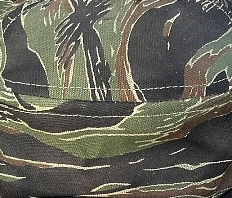
- Sample of tiger stripe fabric
- Type: Military camouflage pattern
- Place of origin: Unknown (Likely South Vietnam or United States)

Service history
- In service: 1963–present
- Used by: See Users
- Wars: Vietnam War; Laotian Civil War; Cambodian Civil War; Lebanese Civil War; Nicaraguan Revolution; Gulf War; War in Afghanistan (2001–2021); Russo-Ukrainian War; Gang war in Haiti

Production history
- Designer: Numerous
- Manufacturer: Numerous

Tiger stripe is the name of a group of camouflage patterns developed for close-range use in dense jungle during jungle warfare by the South Vietnamese Armed Forces and adopted in late 1962 to early 1963 by US Special Forces during the Vietnam War. During and after the Vietnam War, the pattern was adopted by several other Asian countries. It derives its name from its resemblance to a tiger's stripes. It features narrow stripes that look like brush-strokes of green and brown, and broader brush-strokes of black printed over a lighter shade of olive or khaki. The brush-strokes interlock rather than overlap, as in French Lizard pattern (TAP47) from which it apparently derives.

== History ==
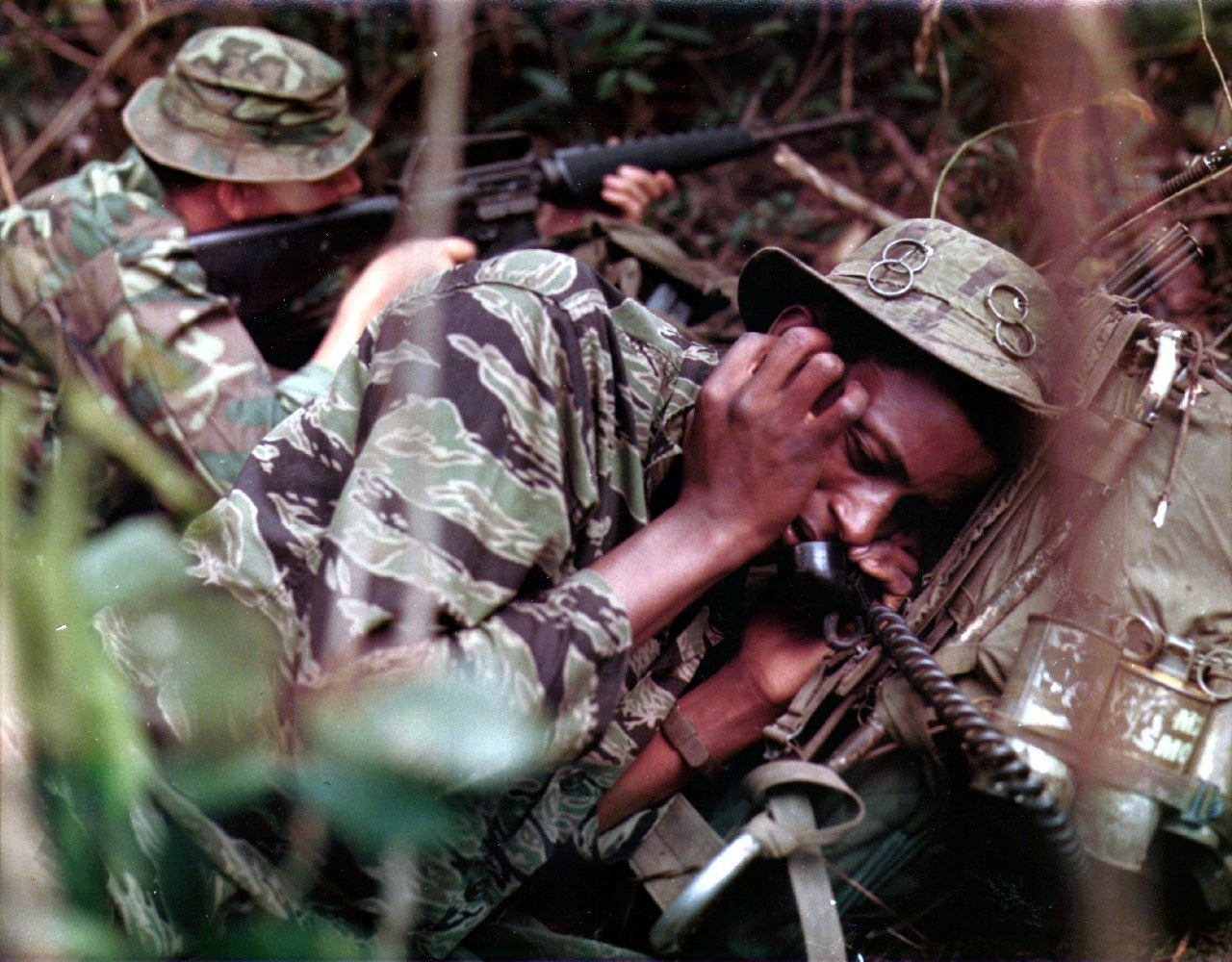
Sergeant Billy H. Faulks calls for air support, Co D, 151st (Ranger) Inf., Vietnam War, 1969.

It is unclear who developed the first tiger stripe pattern, consisting of 64 stripes. The French used a similar pattern called "lizard" in the First Indochina War. After the French left Vietnam, the Republic of Vietnam Marine Division began using a derived pattern which differed in having interlocking elements instead of overlapping ones. Variants of the pattern were later adopted by Vietnamese Rangers (Biệt Động Quân) and Special Forces (Lực Lượng Đặc Biệt). When the United States began sending advisors to South Vietnam, USMAAG advisors attached to the ARVN were authorized to wear their Vietnamese unit's combat uniform with US insignia. Soon, many American special operations forces in the Vietnamese theater of operations wore the pattern, despite not always being attached to ARVN units.

Tiger stripe was never an official US-issue item. Personnel permitted to wear it at first had their camo fatigues custom-made by local tailors, with ARVN uniforms being too small for most Americans; for this reason there were many variations of the basic tiger stripe pattern. In 1963, Marine Corps Advisors and from 1964, 5th Special Forces Group of the Green Berets contracted with Vietnamese and other Southeast Asian producers to make fatigues and other items such as boonie hats using tiger stripe fabric. Being manufactured by different producers in places like Thailand, Korea and Okinawa, Japan, there was a wide variety of patterns and color shade variations. They were made in both Asian and US sizes.

During the latter stages of the war, tiger stripe was gradually replaced in American reconnaissance units by the then-new ERDL pattern, a predecessor of the US four-color woodland pattern from 1967. The Special Forces-advised Civilian Irregular Defense Group (CIDG) used tiger stripe from 1963 until disbanded in 1971. Special Forces personnel wore tiger stripe when conducting operations with the CIDG.

Besides American and ARVN forces, Australian and New Zealand military personnel used tiger stripe uniforms while on advisory duty with the ARVN units. Personnel from the Australian Special Air Service Regiment and the New Zealand Special Air Service were the principal wearers of tiger-stripe uniforms (and ERDL uniforms) in theater, while regular Australian and New Zealand troops wore the standard-issue olive green uniforms.

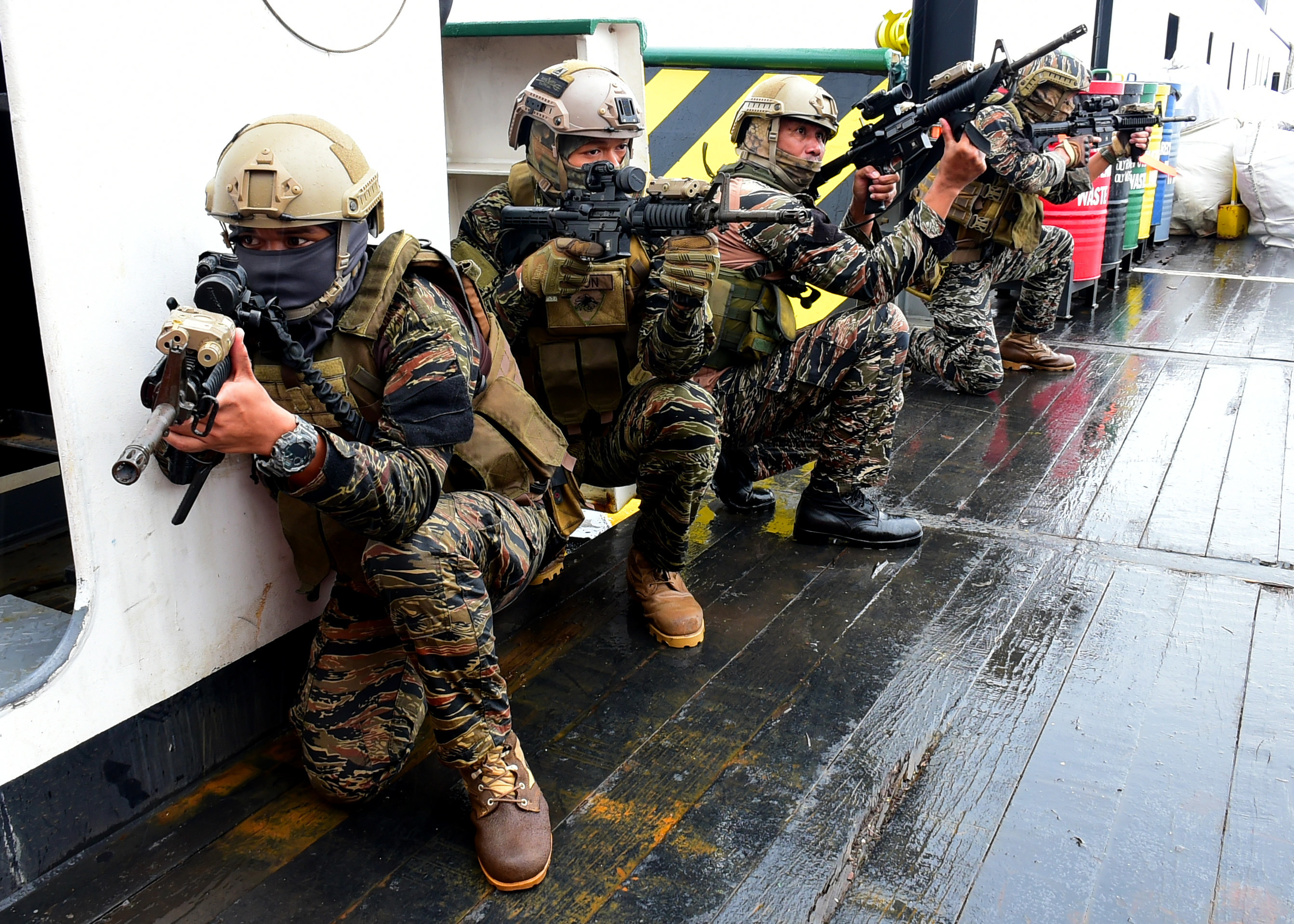
Philippine Navy NAVSOCOM at the SEACAT 2018 Exercise.

Outside of Vietnam, Thailand and the Philippines have been the most prolific manufacturers of tiger stripe designs since the Vietnam War. Philippine Naval Special Operations Command personnel wear tiger stripe combat uniforms.

The pattern was tested by the USMC prior to the adoption of MARPAT through the Scout Sniper Instructor School.

== Users ==
=== Current ===
- Afghanistan: Used by Taliban forces.
- Argentina: Used by the Grupo Especial de Operaciones Federales (Argentina).
- Dominican Republic: Used by Special Forces.
- France: Used by French Foreign Legion forces in French Guiana under the Army Jungle Warfare School.
- Guyana: Used by the GDF ground forces and Coast Guard.
- Haiti
- Iraq: A desert tiger stripe variant consisting of four shades of brown was known to be used by Iraqi commandos.
- Philippines: Used by the Special Forces Regiment and the Naval Special Operations Command.
- Russia: Used by the MVD and other Russian law enforcement agencies as the Kamysh (Reed) or Tigr (Tiger). Various security agencies, notably OMON, have used an urban variant known as Ten′ (Shadow), which uses various shades of blue in place of the Kamysh design's more standard woodland coloration. The Kamysh is based on Malaysian-made tiger stripe patterns adopted for Russian use.
- South Sudan: Used by the Tiger Division, South Sudan People's Defence Forces.
- Thailand: Use by Aerial Reinforcement Division (known as Police Aerial Reinforcement Unit: PARU) of Border Patrol Police, Royal Thai Police. It is believed to have been in use since the Laotian Civil War, when the unit was trained by the CIA for operations in Laos and has remained the unit's camouflage until today.
- Ukraine: Helikon-Tex made uniforms used by Armed Forces of Ukraine.
- United States: Green and desert tiger stripe were used in Afghanistan by US Special Forces units. Used by Green Berets in OPFOR drills.

=== Former ===
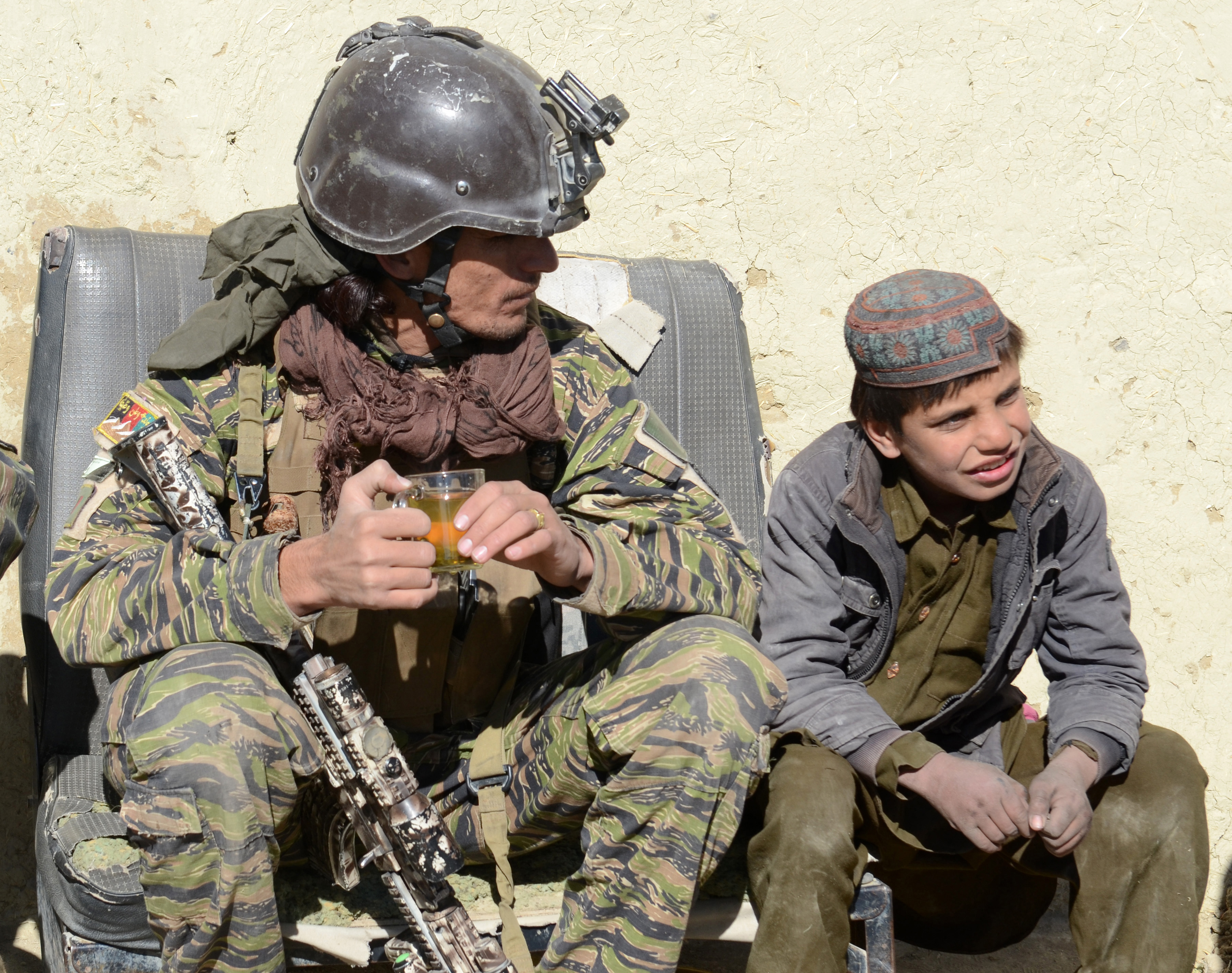
Tigerstripe camo seen being used by Afghan Security Forces.

- Islamic Republic of Afghanistan: Used by National Directorate of Security and the Directorate of Protection and Security (DPS).
- Australia: Australian Special Air Service Regiment (Vietnam War)
- Croatia: Used local copies made in Croatia by the Croatian National Guard.
- Khmer Republic: Formerly used in the 1970s.
- Paraguay: Some Paraguayan military units used tiger stripe patterns made for the ROC military before they were replaced by digital patterns.
- Philippines: Used by the Special Action Force during the EDSA Revolution.
- New Zealand: New Zealand Special Air Service (Vietnam War)
- South Vietnam: Used by ARVN Rangers, CIDGs and Marines
- Thailand: Used by Thai special forces units. One version of the pattern is made with darker camo dyes with a pale background color, known as Shadowtiger.
- Ukraine: Formerly used by Ukrainian Berkut forces prior to being disbanded.
- United States: Used by American soldiers advising the ARVN. and by American special forces operating in Vietnam.

=== Non-state actors ===
- Khmer People's National Liberation Front: Used Thai-made tigerstripe camos in the 1980s.
- Liberation Tigers of Tamil Eelam: Used by LTTE forces. Fabric acquired from Norway and tailored in Sri Lanka. They consist of a blue variant for Sea Tigers and black for Black Tigers.
- Shan State Army: Known to be used from the 1960s to the 1980s.
- Moro Islamic Liberation Front: Used by the Bangsamoro Islamic Armed Forces.

== See also ==
- Airman Battle Uniform
- Denison smock
- Rhodesian Brushstroke

== Sources ==
- Conboy, Kenneth (1991). South-East Asian Special Forces. Osprey Publishing. ISBN 978-1855321069.
- Dougherty, Martin (2017). Camouflage at War: An Illustrated Guide from 1914 to the Present Day. Amber Books. ISBN 978-1782744986.
- Fontanellaz, Adrien (2020). Paradise Afire Volume 3: The Sri Lankan War 1990-1994. Helion & Company. ISBN 978-1913118624.
- Galeotti, Mark (2019). Armies of Russia's War in Ukraine. Osprey Publishing. ISBN 978-1472833440.
- Johnson, Richard Denis (1999). Tiger Patterns: A Guide to the Vietnam War's Tigerstripe Combat Fatigue Patterns and Uniforms. Schiffer Publishing. ISBN 978-0-7643-0756-0.
- Larson, Eric H. (2021). Camouflage: Modern International Military Patterns. Barnsley: Pen & Sword. ISBN 9781526739537.
- Rottman, Gordon L. (2008). US Army Long-Range Patrol Scout in Vietnam 1965-71. Osprey Publishing. ISBN 978-1846032509.
- Chao Tzang Yawnghwe (1987). The Shan of Burma: Memoirs of a Shan Exile. Singapore: Institute of Southeast Asian Studies. ISBN 9789812306012.
