= Denison smock =

WWII British military jacket

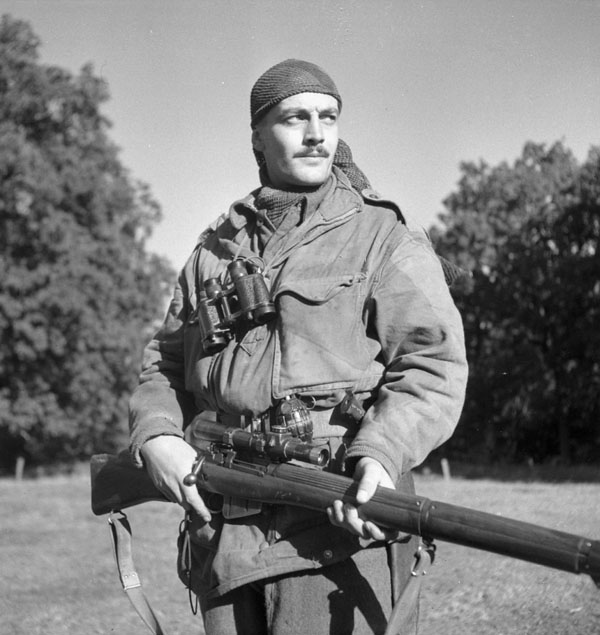
Canadian Sniper Sgt Harold Marshall wearing a Denison smock.

The Denison smock was a coverall jacket issued to Special Operations Executive (SOE) agents, the Parachute Regiment, the Glider Pilot Regiment, Air Landing Regiments, air observation post squadrons, Commando units, and other Commonwealth airborne units, to wear over their Battle Dress uniform during the Second World War, remaining in service with the British Army until the early 1970s when it was replaced by a version in the Disruptive Pattern Material (DPM) smock. The garment was also issued as standard to the scout and sniper platoons of line infantry battalions.

The smock was initially worn over the paratrooper's webbing equipment, but under his parachute pack and harness, as its primary purpose was to prevent the wearer's equipment from snagging while emplaned or during a jump. It was equally useful for camouflage and as a windproof garment that provided a method of carrying ammunition or equipment. Contemporary photographs show that airborne troops preferred to wear the smocks under their webbing once they had landed.

== Development ==
The smock replaced an expedient first issue khaki-drill paratroop jump-jacket that had been directly copied in 1940 from the German parachutist's Knochensack ("bone sack"). This first "smock" was designed to be stepped into and pulled up over the body like a set of overalls which had had the legs removed from mid-thigh. The new Denison smock was put on and removed by pulling over the head: the collar zipped open as far as the chest, making it a true smock style. The zip was covered by a cloth flap, which had no buttons or other method to fasten it down. Introduced in 1942, the "Airborne Smock Denison Camouflage" often said to bear a camouflage pattern designed by a Major Denison, a member of a camouflage unit under the command of eminent stage designer Oliver Messel, however research by the Parachute Regiment and Airborne Forces Museum, has shown that no such person existed and it is likely that 'Denison' is a misspelling of 'Denim'. An alternative name was the "Smock Denison Airborne Troops".

The Denison was a popular garment among officers who could acquire them—Company Sergeant Major CC Martin, DCM, MM of The Queen's Own Rifles of Canada mentioned in his memoir Battle Diary that senior officers and sergeant majors of his battalion wore the Denison universally.

=== 1st Pattern ===
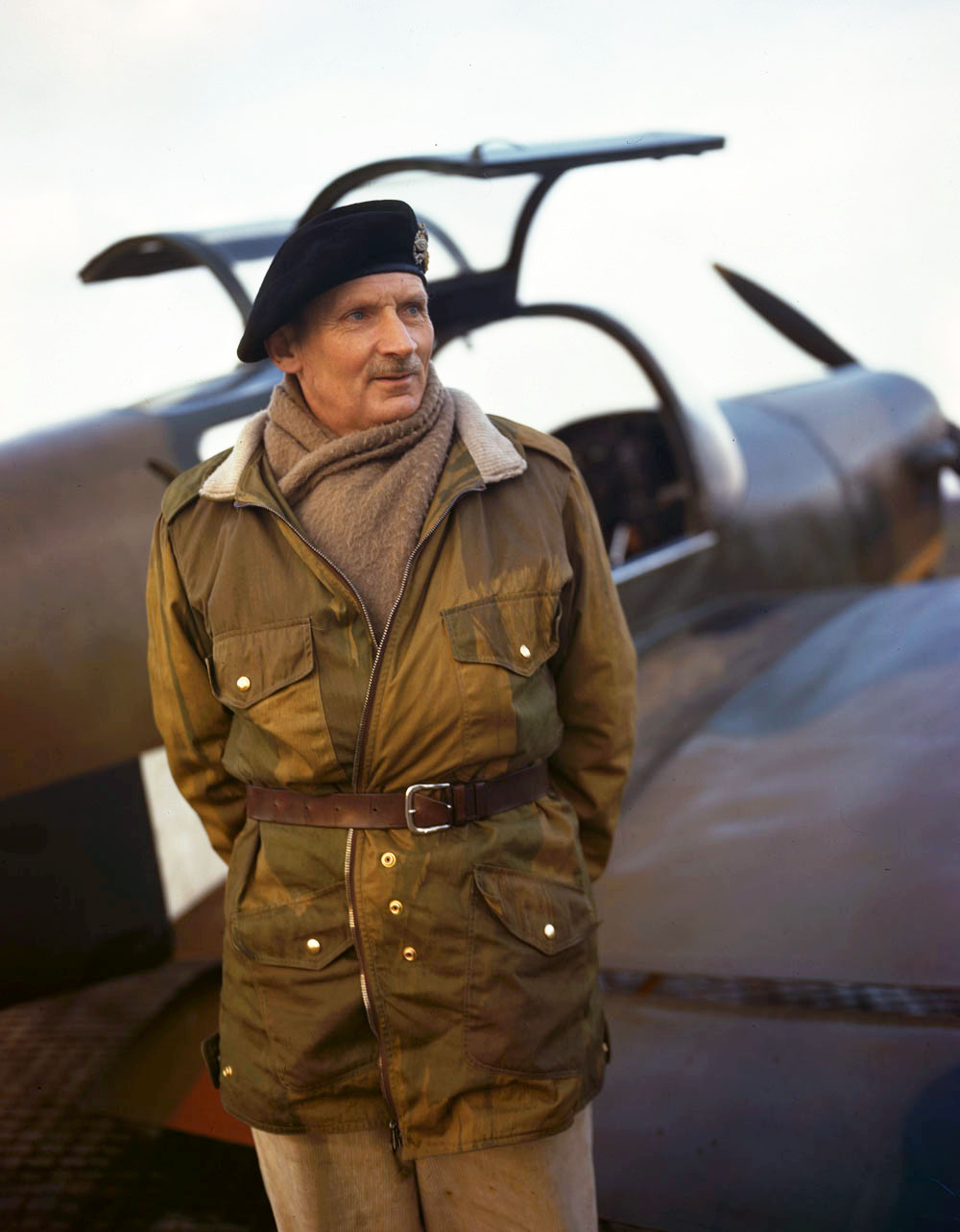
British Field Marshal Bernard Montgomery wearing a Windak smock

The smock was made from loose-fitting, yellowish-sand coloured, heavyweight twill material, allegedly hand-painted with broad, mop like brushes using non-colourfast dyes in broad pea green and dark brown stripes, or "brush-strokes". With use the base colour faded to a sandy buff, and the overlaid shades gained a blended appearance. The colours of the 1st pattern smock were thought to best suit the wearer to the North African and Italian theatres. It had a half length zip fastener made of steel, knitted woollen cuffs, four external pockets that secured with brass snaps (two on the chest and two below the waist), two internal pockets on the chest, and epaulettes that secured with plastic battle dress buttons. The inside of the collar was lined with soft khaki flannel (or in senior officer's smocks, Angora wool). A "beaver tail" fastened beneath the crotch from the back to the front of the smock – which kept it from riding up during a parachute descent. When not used, the tail would hang down behind the wearer's knees, hence the nickname "men with tails", given by the Arabs in North Africa in 1942. The smock was styled as a very loose garment, since it would be worn over Battle Dress, but it could be adjusted to some extent with tightening tabs on both sides of the lower part of the smock.

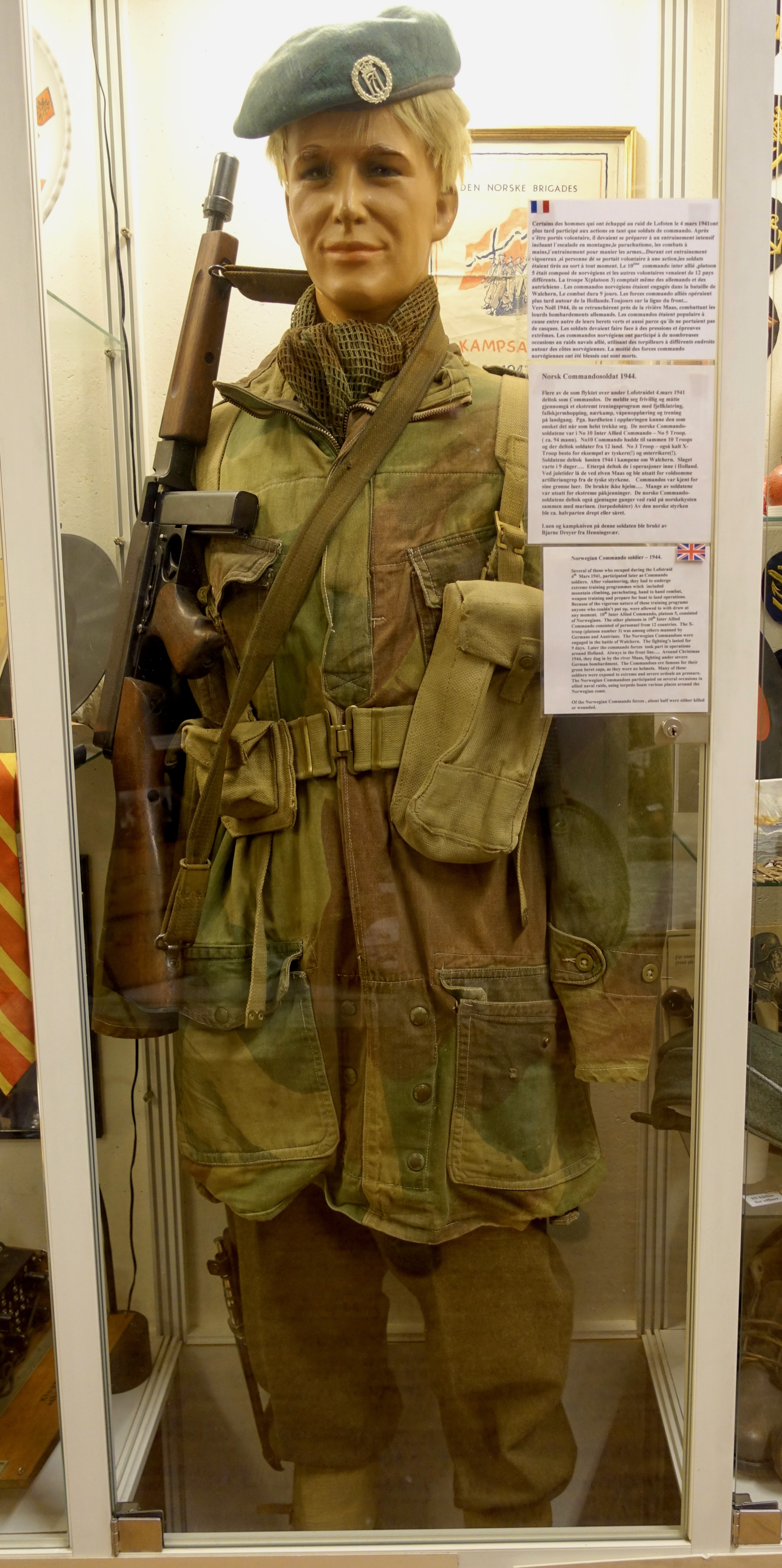
One of the WWII Denison patterns in a Norwegian museum

The smock was most commonly associated with British and Commonwealth airborne units, and the Special Air Service Regiment, after D-Day, but its initial use was by members of the Special Operations Executive (SOE), parachuted or landed into enemy territory between 1941 and 1944. In the early smocks the colours were meant to be impermanent and wash out, leaving the garment looking like a typical French artisan or labourer's chemise, and thus, hopefully, aiding the wearer's Escape and Evasion chances. As the newly formed Airborne Forces expanded, so the need for smocks grew, meaning that they were by now screen printed for easier production.

For use by Airborne troops, the Denison was worn over the battledress and under the webbing, with a sleeveless green denim oversmock being worn over the ensemble to prevent rigging lines snagging in the webbing and causing a 'chute malfunction. This sleeveless smock had a long external zip (often removed and used to make the half-zip Denisons full zip), a monkey tail that press studded to the outside front of the oversmock and two elasticated open pockets on the lower front which were to hold grenades for use whilst in the air or immediately upon landing. After a successful parachute landing fall, the oversmock was discarded.

=== 2nd Pattern ===
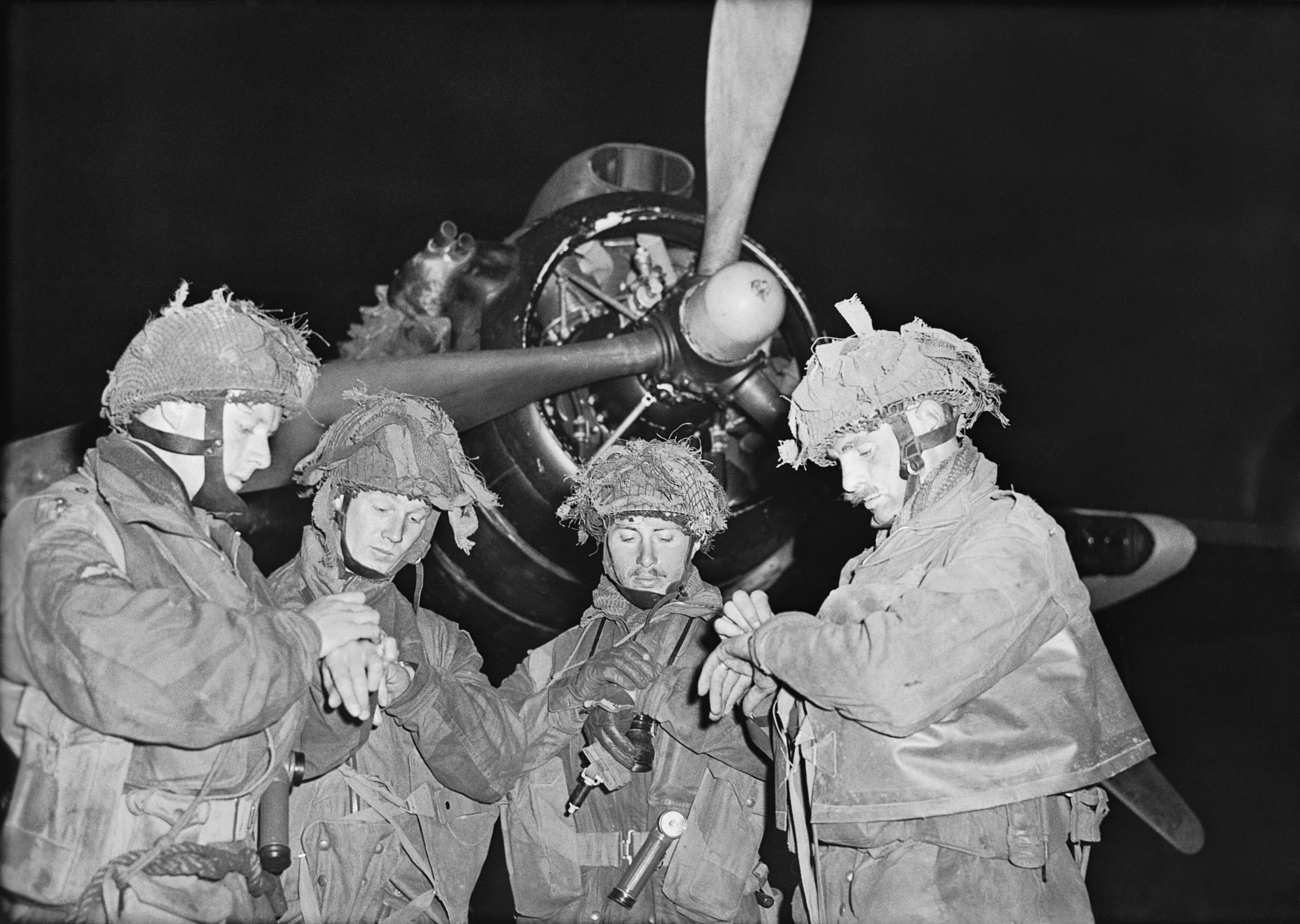
5/6 June 1944. Pathfinder officers synchronising their watches in front of an Armstrong Whitworth Albemarle before flying into battle in Normandy. They all wear 2nd Pattern Denison smocks

The 1st Pattern smock design was replaced in 1944 by a second pattern which had buttoning tabs at the cuffs and brass snap fasteners to stow the tail flap on the back of the jacket when not needed. Other detail differences included reduced length and tube shaped rather than tapered sleeves. In order to make it more wind-proof, the tops of woollen socks were often sewn to the cuffs. The half-length zip fastener on this smock was made of brass. The colours of the 2nd pattern also differed from those of the earlier smocks, the base colour varying from a light to a medium olive combination, with overlying brushstrokes of reddish brown and dark olive green. These colours were thought better suited to the North Western European theatre.

=== Variations ===
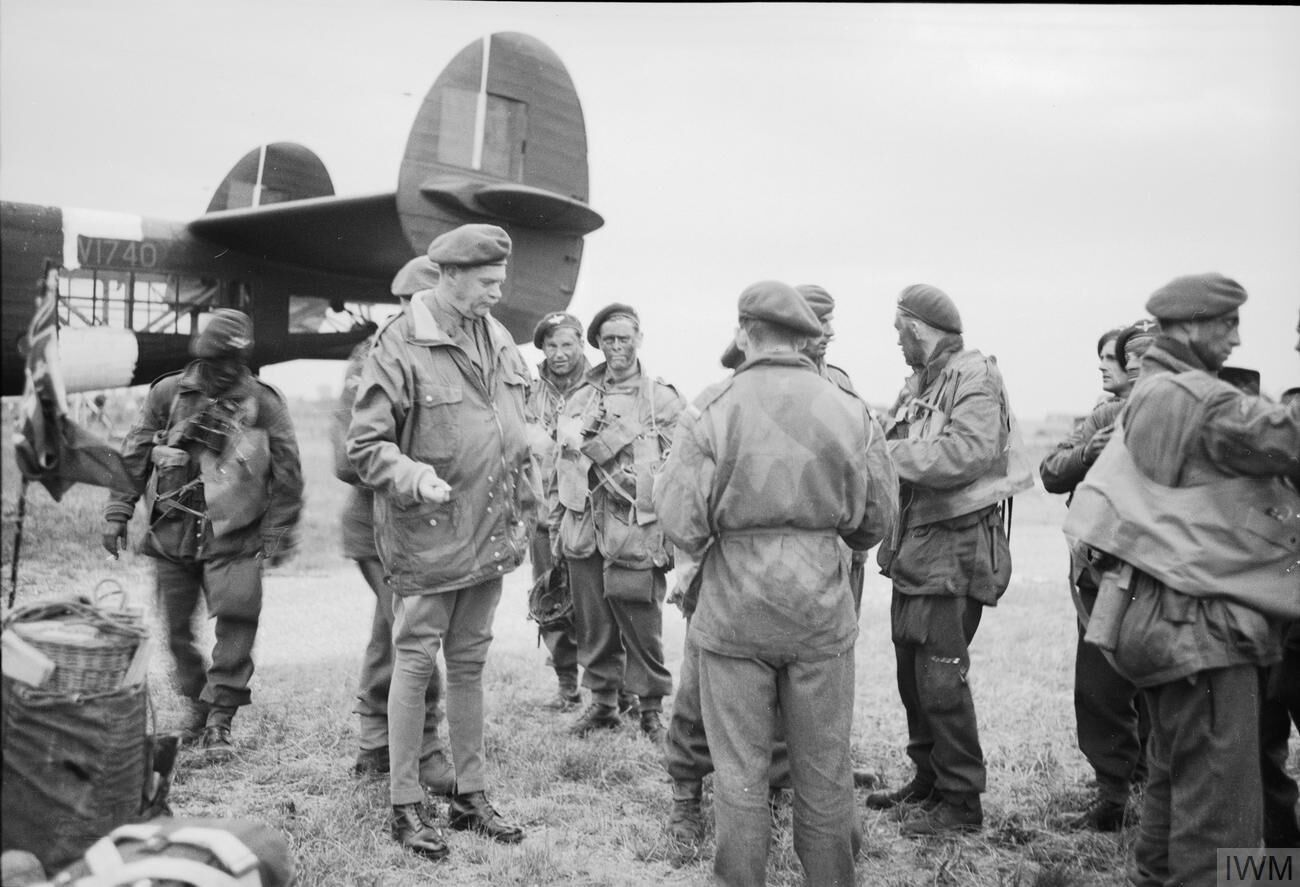
The Airborne Assault: Major-General Richard Gale, GOC 6th Airborne Division, talking to troops of 5th Parachute Brigade before they emplane in an Albemarle at Royal Air Force Harwell on the evening of 4 or 5 June

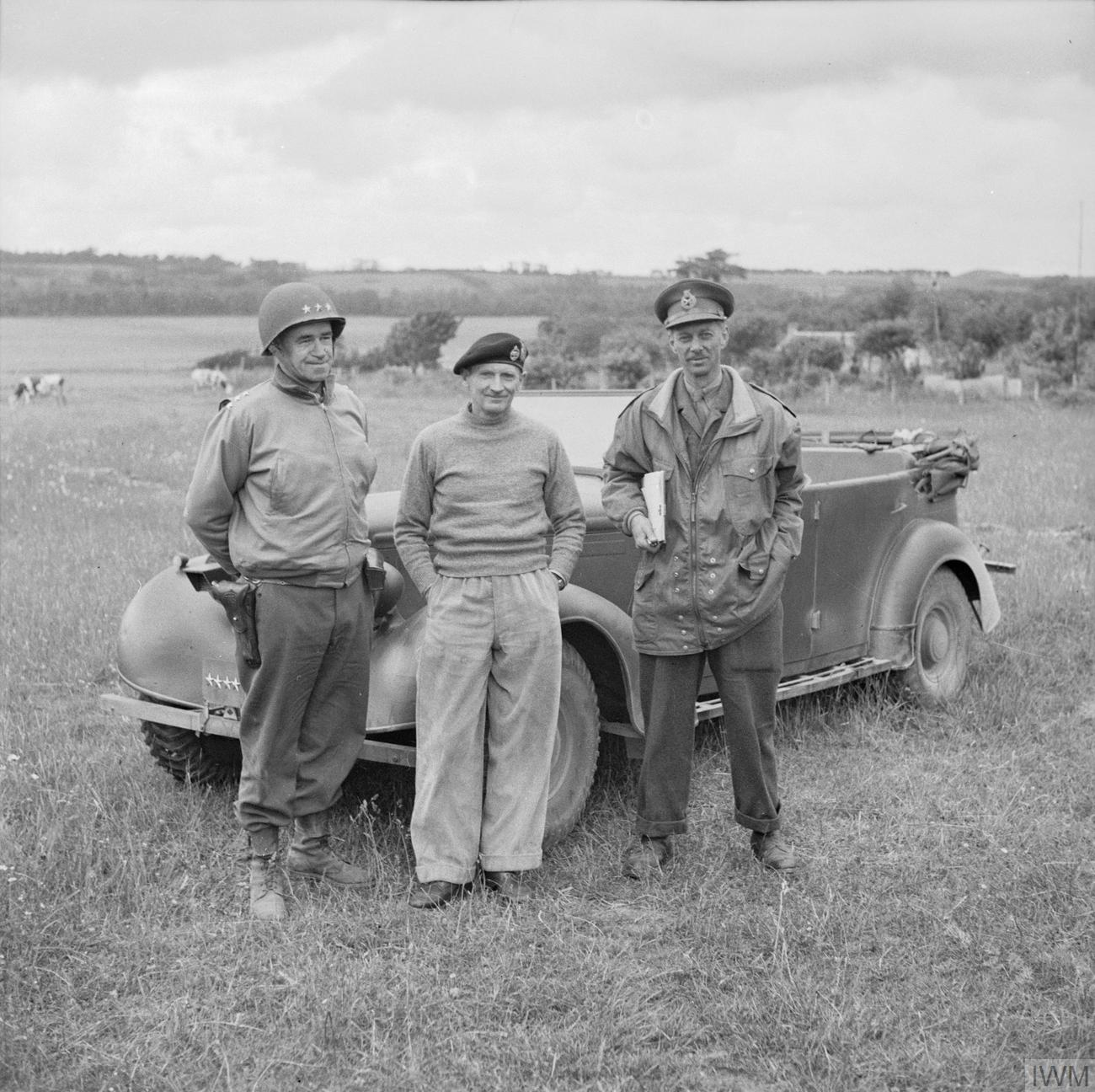
Lieutenant-General Miles Dempsey (right) wearing a Windak smock – 10 June 1944

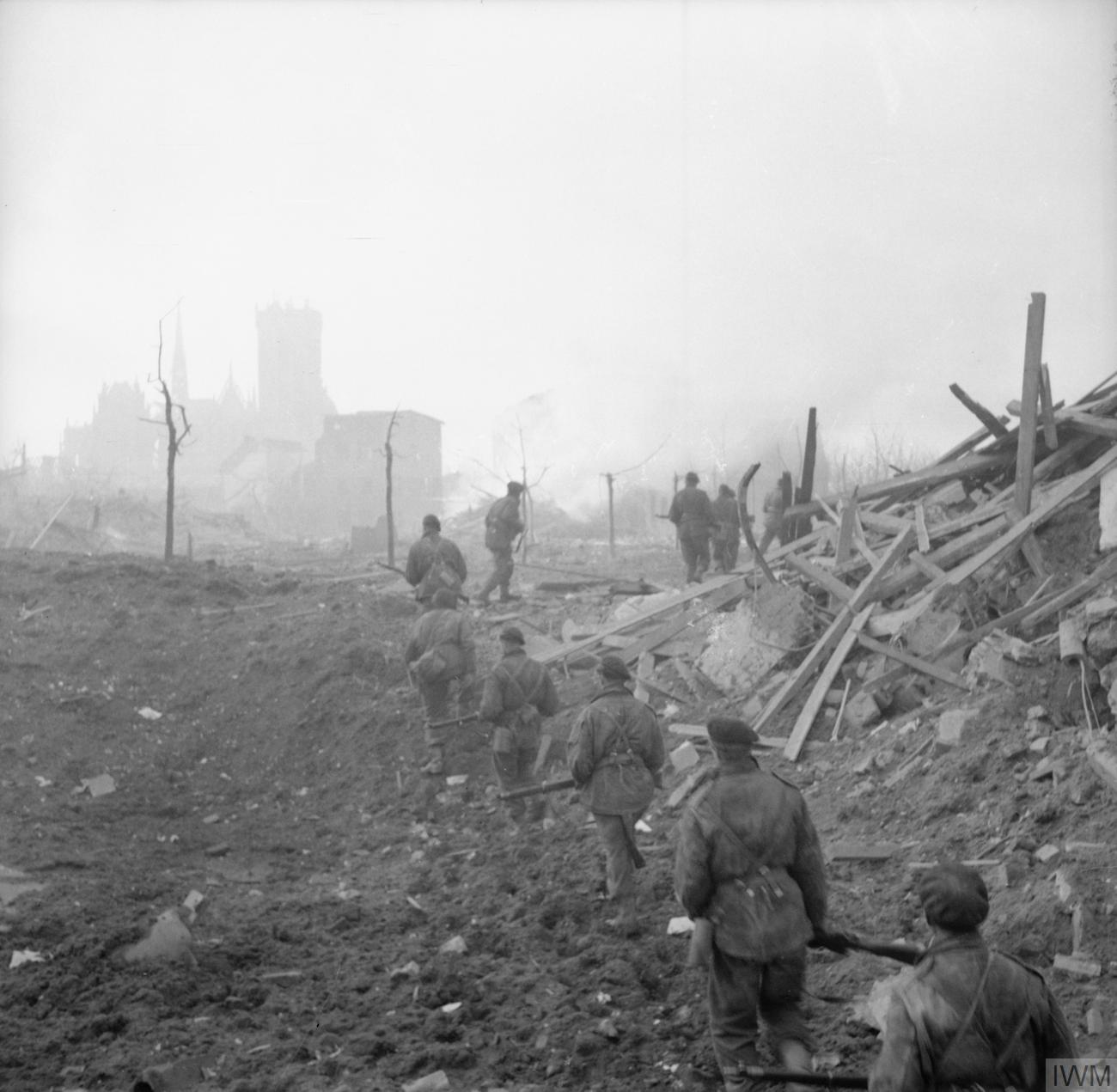
A patrol of 6 Commando, (1st Commando Brigade) wearing Denisons, set off to round up snipers in Wesel in 1945

Denisons of either pattern issued to officers had woollen collar linings. By the time of the D-Day airdrops, some officers had had their jackets modified with a full-length zip by their personal tailors, since this was not available on the issue item. Wartime photographs show that some other ranks had their smocks serviced the same way by the unit tailor. The zip was most commonly removed from the 1942 Parachutist's Oversmock, a longer, sleeveless, fully zipped jump-jacket, made of a grey-green denim material that was worn under the parachute harness, but over everything else (including the Denison). This Parachutist's Oversmock also featured a tail flap and its sole intention was to prevent the paratroopers equipment from snagging while emplaned or during a jump. It was to be discarded on landing. The oversmock had capacious elasticated pockets on the skirt, intended as a safer way to carry grenades. These pockets were sometimes removed and added to the Denisons as well.

A sniper's variant of the Denison smock is known, in effect an issue smock with a specialized pocket (approximately 10" x 10") added to the left rear in which could be carried food & water, maps, ammunition, and other small equipment. Modifications were done at the unit level and known examples all vary from one sample to the next.

The Royal Marines used a version which had the half zip replaced with buttons and loops for fastening the opening.

A waterproof Denison in waxed dark green material was also very rarely found during the War.

=== Windproof smock ===
The 1942 Pattern Smock, Windproof, with matching over-trousers, in lighter-weight denim, had a similar appearance to the Denison but was designed to be worn as an outer windproof layer over Battledress. It was issued to infantry battalions from 1943. Both items were screen printed with colour-fast pigments in a bold Splinter pattern camouflage similar to that of the 'brushstroke' pattern applied to the Denison. The pattern has a base colour of pink with overlying brushstrokes of plum, pale green and dark brown. The Smock, Windproof and trousers were also issued to British troops in Korea during the winter of 1950. It is sometimes incorrectly referred to as the "SAS Windproof". It was not designed much for parachuting, and lacked a crotch flap, having a drawstring hem instead. The most distinctive point of difference between 'Windproofs' and the Denison smock are that the former are hooded. Windproof smocks and trousers were worn by French paratroopers in Indochina, and to a lesser extent in Algeria. The French referred to the pattern as "sausage skin".

Variations of the 'Windproof' have been the basic Special Forces smock until the present, with several alternative colours seen over the years – white (or at least natural cotton) for LRDG's desert use; olive green; black; and, in now very rare later issues of the Smock, Windproof, 1963 Pattern, the DPM introduced in the late 1960s. The current issue Smock, Windproof is in the latest variation of the DPM design.

=== SOE Jumpsuit ===
A camouflaged overall garment in a similar camouflage pattern along with a matching cloth helmet were issued to the SOE and allied agents parachuting into occupied Europe and were discarded shortly after descent. The "striptease suit" came with a side shovel pocket, pistol holster, knife pouch on cuff and parallel zips for instant removal of garment. SOE jumpsuits were also issued in white for winter/arctic environments.

== Post-war use ==
The Denison smock (or Smock, camouflage on later garments) remained on inventories in Commonwealth and other militaries after the Second World War, and was popular with troops in Korea. It remained standard combat dress for the Royal Marines and the Parachute Regiment until the mid-1970s (see below), and changed little from the wartime issue. A full-length brass zip had become standard with no cloth flap to cover it and the knitted cuffs deleted on the 2nd Pattern smock were reintroduced. The base colour of the camouflage pattern was now a lighter khaki shade. The "Newey" press studs changed from brass/copper to nickel-plated versions.

=== 1959 Pattern ===
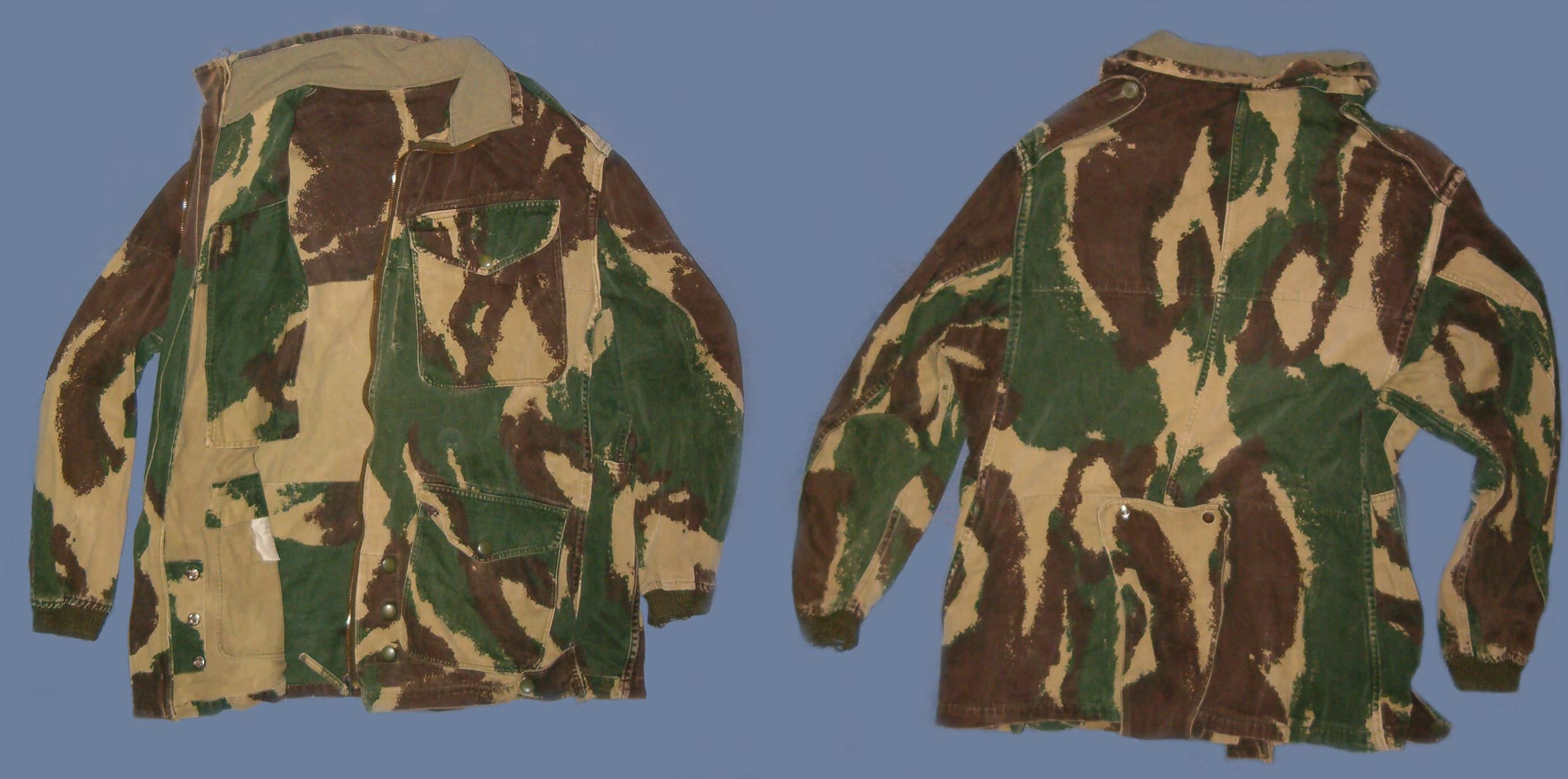
The 1959 Pattern Denison Smock.

The Denison was significantly modified in the 1959 Pattern. This had a higher hem line, and was much less baggy. This was because wearing it over the personal carrying equipment (but under the parachute harness) while parachuting was no longer the practice. The '59 Pattern retained the full length zip and knitted wool cuffs, but the flannel lining of the collar was changed from khaki to light green. The most obvious difference, however, was the change in pattern and colours of the camouflage. The pattern became less random, more defined, with broad, vertical brush-strokes, and greater contrast between the base light khaki and the overprinted tones. The green was much darker than previous versions, and the brown was now chocolate, rather than brick. Where green and brown overlapped, they formed a fourth, darker, olive brown colour.

=== Replacement ===
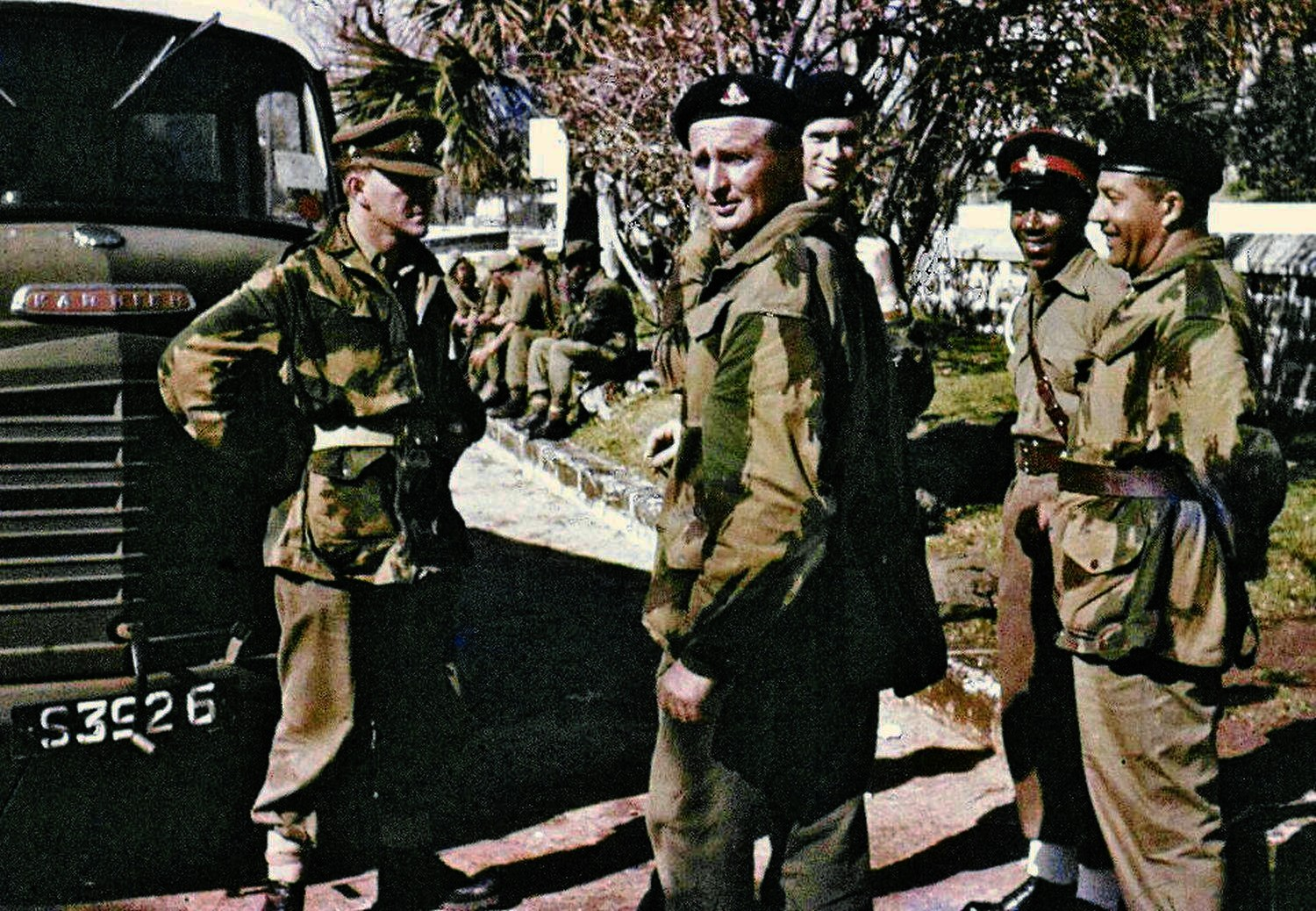
Bermuda Militia Artillery soldiers in Denison smocks

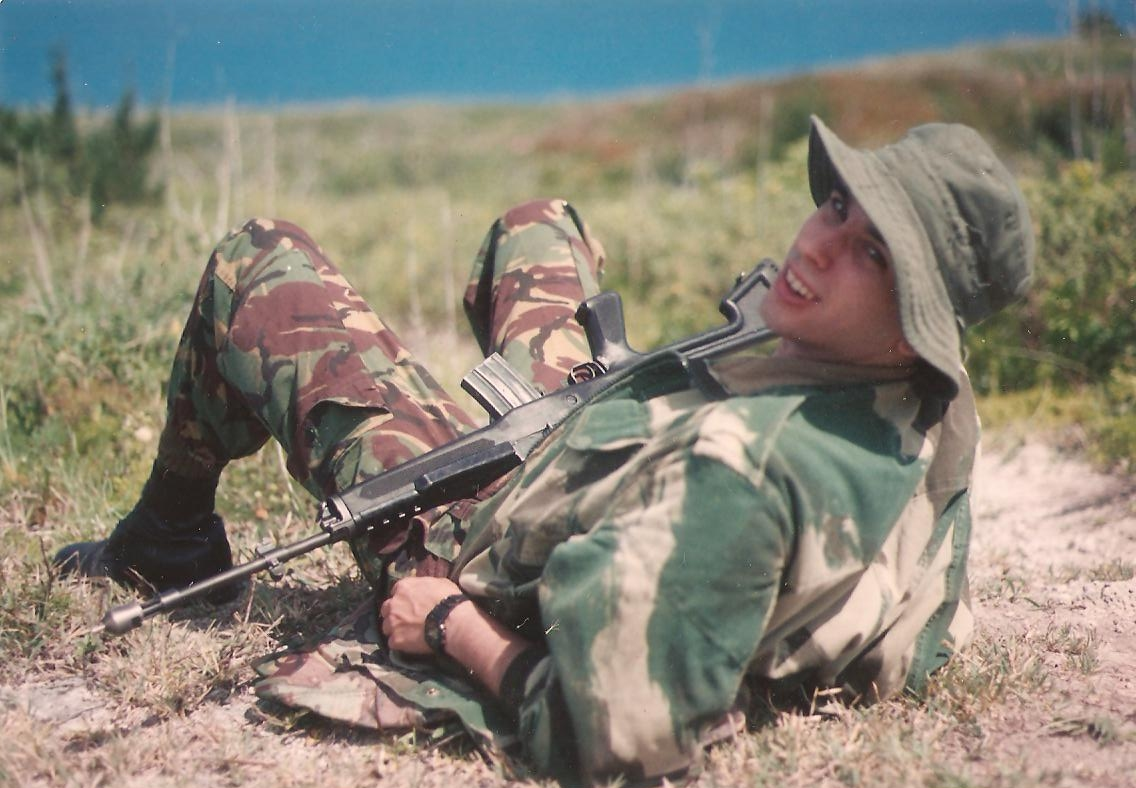
Royal Bermuda Regiment soldier wearing a Denison smock while acting as "enemy" in 1994

The British Army had officially adopted a DPM combat uniform for general use in 1972, and a Smock, combat, DPM was introduced as the general issue jacket of the range. Both the Royal Marines and the Parachute Regiment, together with Air Despatchers of 47 Air Despatch Squadron (RCT) and the 395th Air Despatch Troop (RCT) (V), continued to wear the Denison smock, (typically with olive green Trousers, combat, 1960 pattern for field use or "lightweight" trousers in barracks and walking-out) until the late 1970s. The Bermuda Militia Artillery and the Bermuda Rifles (after 1965 amalgamated into the Bermuda Regiment, now the Royal Bermuda Regiment), the territorial units of the Imperial fortress colony of Bermuda, wore the Denison from the 1950s until adopting the 1968 Pattern DPM uniform in the early 1980s. This presumably resulted from the many officers and other ranks who had served in the Parachute Regiment, Special Air Services and other special forces during the Second World War. The unit's Junior Leaders and the Bermuda Cadet Corps continued to wear the Denison into the 1990s.

"Although a status symbol in the British Army, the Denison," wrote ex-SAS officer, Barry Gregory, "was windproof but not waterproof and stank after use like a coal-miner's sweat shirt. I used it in extremis as a pillow when sleeping out with sleeping-bag and poncho to keep my head above ground level."

In the UK, the DPM Smock, Parachutist's began to replace the Denison smock beginning in 1977. The new DPM replacement was not constructed of the Denison's heavyweight twill, but was instead made from the same cotton material as the '68-Pattern combat jacket. However, it was cut like the Denison smock, with smaller Newey press-stud (snap) fastened (but now bellowed) pockets, a full-length zip without buttons down the front, the traditional olive green knitted wool cuffs, and a 'crotch flap' on the outside of the back. With the introduction of the British Army's multi-terrain camouflage pattern (MTP), a version of the "Smock, Parachutist" in that pattern was issued.

The Canadian Airborne Regiment was first issued an olive green replacement for the Denison in the 1950s, and in 1975 a Disruptive Pattern parachute smock entered service, remaining in the inventory until the regiment disbanded in 1995.

== Legacy ==
Belgian special forces units serving with the British during the Second World War included the Belgian Special Air Service (SAS). On their return to Belgium after the war, the unit (and its successors) continued to wear the Denison Smock, with the design following a separate evolutionary path there (M54 in Moon and Balls pattern, M56 in Belgian brushstroke pattern, and M58 in jigsaw pattern).

The French SAS wore the Denison while fighting with Free French Forces to liberate France during WWII, and continued to wear it after the war. The Denison smock was also utilized by most of the soldiers in the French army's 8^{e} Bataillon de Parachutistes de Choc (8^{e} BPC) in Indochina, including while the unit was at Dien Bien Phu; the majority of the smocks worn were in their original configuration, but modifications (particularly to the front and neck openings) were often made by local tailors or unit riggers.

The British Denison smock also heavily influenced the design of the French jump smock models 1947/51 and 1947/52.

The characteristic "brushstroke" camouflage pattern used on the Denison Smock has had a notable influence on the development of camouflage clothing worldwide. As well as being the design antecedent of its replacement, the four colour Disruptive Pattern, the Denison clearly inspired camouflage patterns used by Belgium, France, Rhodesia, Malaysia, Pakistan, and India.

The most important development based on Denison pattern was the French Lizard pattern, in which the green and brown brush-strokes were more frequent, but much smaller, on a light greyish green base. Lizard evolved into two main styles: vertical, and horizontal (indicating the general direction of the brushstrokes). Other developments changed the shape of the brushstrokes, using intricate grass-like patterns in the Rhodesian pattern, or palm frond-like sprays in the Indian pattern. South African Denison Smocks (later replaced by the Slangvel) were plain sand coloured.

== See also ==
- Uniforms of the British Army
- Smock Parachutist DPM
- Knochensack
- Lizard pattern
- Smock Windproof DPM
- Tiger stripe camouflage
- Rhodesian Brushstroke
