= Lizard (camouflage) =

Family of camouflage patterns

Lizard pattern
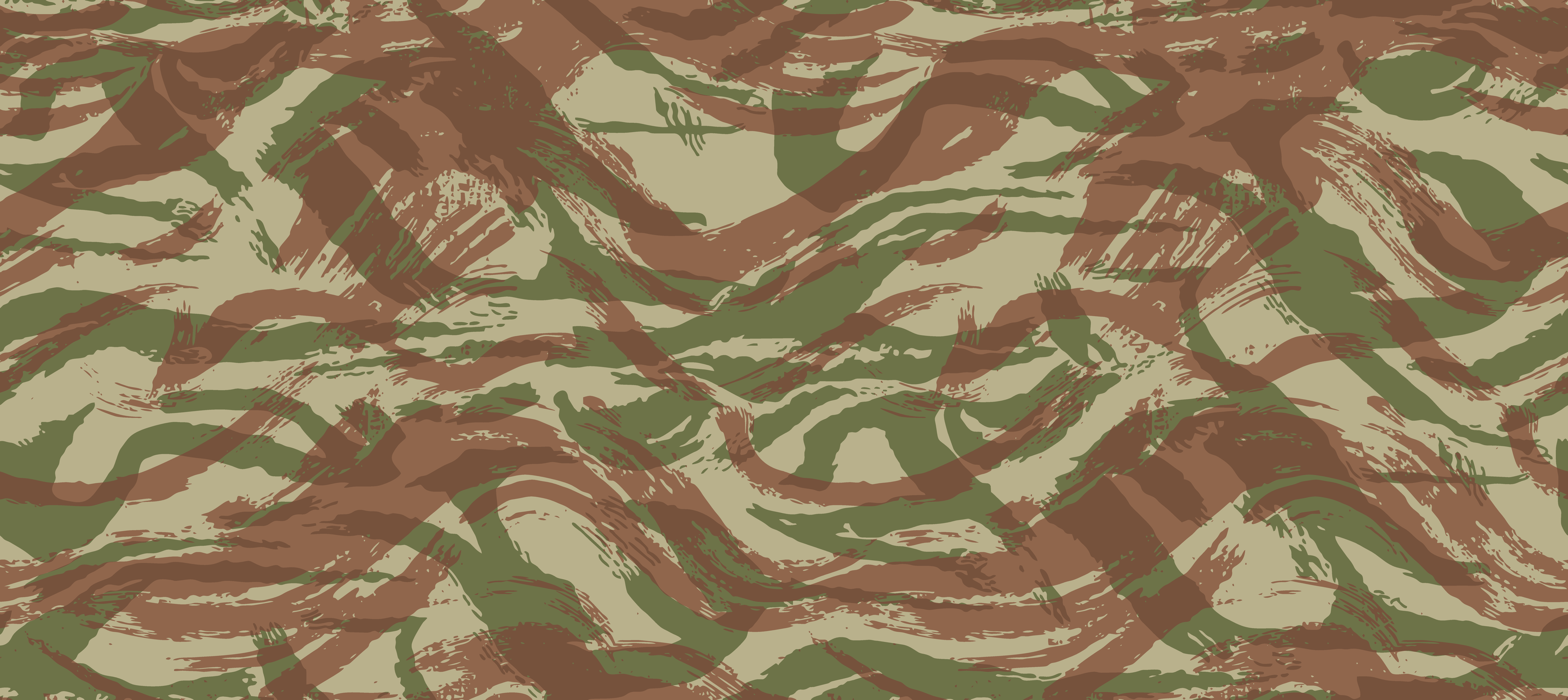
- French Lizard pattern fabric from the 1950s.
- Type: Military camouflage pattern
- Place of origin: France

Service history
- In service: 1947–1980s (French service)
- Used by: See Users
- Wars: First Indochina War; Algerian War; Congo Crisis; Nigerian Civil War; South African Border War; Six Day War; Uganda–Tanzania War; Rhodesian Bush War; Chadian Civil War; Chadian–Libyan conflict Vietnam War; Cambodian Civil War; Laotian Civil War; Portuguese Colonial War; Angolan Civil War; Mozambican Civil War; Sudanese Civil War; Western Sahara conflict Turkish invasion of Cyprus; Lebanese Civil War; Iran-Iraq War; Gulf War; Syrian Civil War

Production history
- Designer: Numerous
- Manufacturer: Numerous
- Produced: 1947–1980 (French production only)

The lizard pattern, also called TAP 47 (Airborne Troops 47) or Leopard pattern for the French is a family of many related designs of military camouflage pattern, first used by the French Army on uniforms from 1947 to the late 1980s. It was based on the British paratroopers' Denison smock. The use of the pattern is widespread in Africa, despite its association with France, because armed factions and militaries tend to obtain them from whichever source has it available.

There are two major types of lizard pattern, horizontal like the original French design, and vertical like the early variant developed by Portugal. In addition, the Vietnam War tiger stripe camouflage pattern is descended from Lizard from 1957.

== Evolution of lizard patterns ==
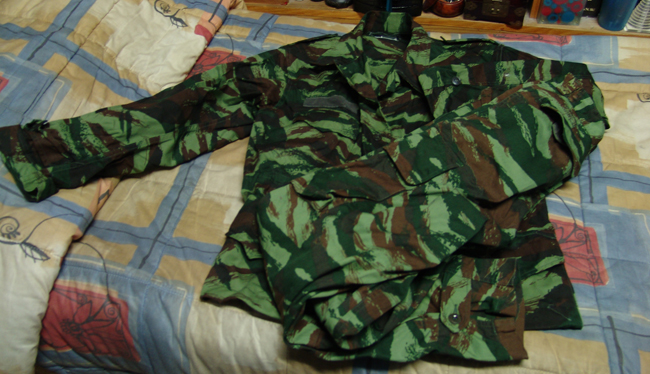
Lizard camo BDU and pants

Lizard patterns have two overlapping prints, generally green and brown, printed with gaps so that a third dyed color, such as a lighter green or khaki, makes up a large part of the pattern. In this, it is printed like earlier British patterns used on that country's Paratroopers Denison smocks. Lizard patterns have narrower printed areas than the British patterns, and the original form had a strong horizontal orientation, disrupting the vertical form of the soldier's body.

=== Horizontal lizard patterns ===
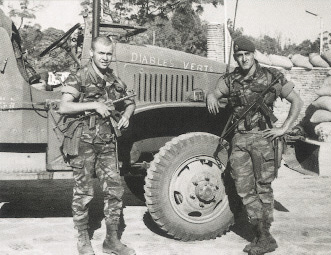
Two French Foreign Legion paratroopers in Kolwezi in 1978

Horizontal lizard patterns in different colour forms were made by the French. A copy of the French pattern, made in Asia, was adopted by some African countries such as Chad, Gabon, Rwanda, and Sudan. In around 1970 Cuba designed a gray variety, used by Cuba and by the FAPLA of Angola. Greece has used a range of horizontal lizard patterns from the 1960s. Soviet Spetsnaz and interior ministry troops wore lizard patterns. The Israel Defence Force used actual French lizard uniforms (donated by France) until 1968, alongside plain (unpatterned) battledress.

After the Algerian War, the "Troupes Aéroportées" (Airborne Troops) "Tenue Leopard"/"tenues de saut" was officially withdrawn from French service in January 1963 as it was felt to be a reminder of the Paratroops mutiny. It was initially replaced with the khaki M1947 "trellis/tenue de campagne" and later the vert armée "treillis Mle. 1964" or "Satin 300" in the late 1960s which evolved into the F1 and F2 uniform sets, the forest camouflage CCE was introduced in 1991.

However, the "tenue camouflee toutes armes" variant was worn by French Forces in Germany throughout the 1960s and by units going overseas into the early 1980s until finally replaced by Central-Europe Camouflage.

=== Vertical lizard patterns ===
Vertical lizard patterns in different colorways were apparently developed in Portugal from the original French horizontal patterns. The lizard pattern had been in use in Portugal since 1956 with the Air Force's Paratroopers, being extended to the Army's Special Rifles units in 1960. With the Portuguese Military engaged in the Overseas Wars mainly fought in the African jungles, the camouflaged uniform was issued throughout the whole Army and some units of the Navy and Air Force. In 1963, a vertical lizard pattern was developed, this replacing the French horizontal pattern. Paradoxically, the Portuguese vertical lizard pattern become popular amongst some of the guerrillas that opposed Portugal in the Overseas Wars and was later adopted by the armed forces of some of the former Portuguese African colonies after their independence.

The Portuguese lizard pattern was adopted by Brazil. Egypt, Greece, India, Lebanese Palestinians and Syria have all used variants of the vertical lizard pattern. SWAPO guerrillas in Namibia wore a wide variety of camouflage, including Portuguese lizard.

=== Other descendants ===
The Vietnam War tiger stripe camouflage is descended from Lizard. It began as a French experimental pattern during the Indochina war. It was based on the TAP47 lizard pattern, and was adopted by the South Vietnamese Marines. Tiger stripe differs from lizard in having its printed areas interlocked rather than overlapped; it also used smaller areas of dyed background color.

== Users ==
=== Current ===
- Algeria: Grey Lizard camos used by Algerian paratroopers. Purple-dominant lizard used in the 1980s.
- Armenia: Greek Lizard camos used by Armenian troops while in peacekeeping operations under NATO command.
- Bahrain: Known to be used by Bahraini commando units.
- Benin
- Brazil: Used by the Brazilian military.
- Cameroon: Used by Armed Forces of Cameroon.
- Cape Verde: Brazilian variant used by Cape Verdean military units in public function roles and by Cape Verdean Naval Infantry. Regular lizard pattern used by rest of Cape Verdean military.
- East Timor: Digital version of the lizard camo used by the East Timorese military.
- Greece: Uses Greek Lizard camos, due to be replaced with another version known as M24.
- Namibia
- Russia
- South Africa: Used clones of Egyptian vertical lizard camo, known as Copy J.

=== Former ===
- Angola: Used Cuban-made lizard camos. UNITA used French-based lizard camos.
- Chad
- Cuba: Formerly used Cuban-made lizard camos, derived from Soviet camo designs.
- Cyprus: Some members of the volunteer old-age men Corp (εθνοφύλακες) of the Cypriot National Guard still use it.
- Egypt: Formerly used vertical lizard camo.
- France
- Israel: Used in the 1960s, supplied by France.
- Nigeria
- Portugal: Used to have Portuguese lizard camos by Portuguese forces fighting in Africa.
- Rhodesia: The Rhodesian SAS wore the Portuguese lizard camo.
- Serbia
- Singapore: Adopted in the 1980s, known as Watermelon.
- Syria: Clones of French Lizard camo used by the Syrian military.
- USSR: Spetsnaz advisors to FAPLA wore Cuban-made lizard camos.
- Yugoslavia: Formerly used by Yugoslav Police from 1992 to 2001.

=== Non-state actors ===
- FALINTIL
- FAPLA: Used Cuban lizard camos.
- FNLA
- Palestinian Liberation Organization
  - Fatah
- MPLA
- RENAMO: Uses Portuguese lizard camo.
- SWAPO: Used Portuguese lizard camos.
- ZANLA: Used Portuguese lizard camouflage.
- ZIPRA: Used Cuban or Portuguese lizard camouflage.

== Bibliography ==
- Abbott, Peter; Botham, Philip (1986). Modern African Wars (1): Rhodesia 1965–80. Osprey Publishing. ISBN 0-85045-728-9.
- Dougherty, Martin (2017). Camouflage at War: An Illustrated Guide from 1914 to the Present Day. Amber Books. ISBN 978-1782744986.
- Galeotti, Mark (2015). Spetsnaz: Russia's Special Forces. Osprey Publishing. ISBN 978-1472807229.
- Jowett, Philip (2016). Modern African Wars (5): The Nigerian-Biafran War 1967–70. Osprey Publishing. ISBN 978-1472816092.
- Larson, Eric H. (2021). Camouflage: International Ground Force Patterns, 1946–2017. Barnsley: Pen & Sword. ISBN 9781526739537.
