= Disruptive Pattern Material =

Camouflage pattern used in British and some Commonwealth militaries

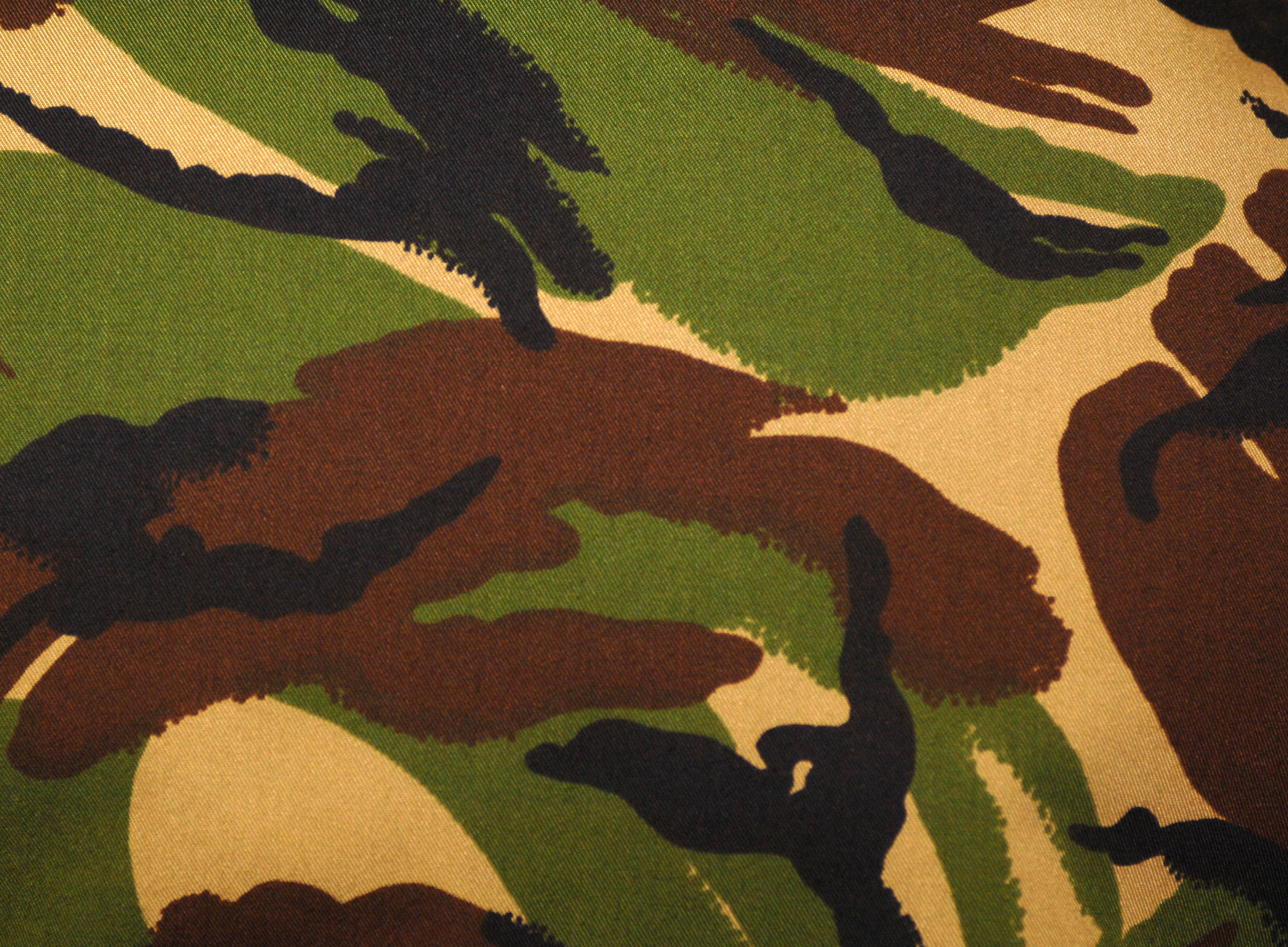
- British DPM Soldier 95 camo pattern
- Type: Military camouflage pattern
- Place of origin: United Kingdom

Service history
- In service: 1966–2016 (for main UK forces)
- Used by: See Users
- Wars: South African Border War; The Troubles; Lebanese Civil War; Iran–Iraq War; Falklands War; Sri Lankan Civil War; Gulf War; East Prigorodny conflict War in Afghanistan (2001–2021); Iraq War; Syrian civil war Russo-Ukrainian War

Production history
- Designed: 1960
- Produced: 1963–present
- Variants: See Variants

Disruptive Pattern Material (DPM) is the commonly used name of a camouflage pattern used by the British Armed Forces as well as many other armed forces worldwide, particularly in former British colonies.

The main variants of DPM are a four-colour woodland pattern, and desert patterns in two, three or four colours. The Woodland Pattern DPM was used with the mediumweight No.8 Temperate Combat Dress (c.1966/1968) and lightweight No.9 Tropical Combat Dress (c.1976). The late 1980s Desert Pattern DPM was designated the No.5 Desert Combat Dress.

DPM has also been produced in black/white/grey Urban DPM, in blue tones and even in purple.

DPM has been phased out in British military service, superseded by Multi-Terrain Pattern.

== History ==
The British Army first used a form of DPM for the famous Denison smock issued to the Parachute Regiment and British Commandos from the early 1940s. The first examples of this design were said to be hand-painted. The Denison smock design went through minor changes, and continued in use with the Royal Marines and the Parachute Regiment until the 1970s.

== Development ==
=== 1960 Pattern ===
From 1960, the British Army was issued with the 1960 Pattern field-uniform, consisting of a Combat Smock, Combat Trousers, a Combat Hood attached to the smock by two epaulette buttons and a third button concealed under the collar, and, for exceptionally cold conditions, a Parka.

=== First limited use ===
In the early 1960s, a new British DPM was developed, using the four basic western European temperate colours of black, dark brown, mid-green and a dark sand. It made a very effective camouflage that has survived in its basic design, with no more than slight changes to the colours and pattern until current times.

This design was probably used first on a very small scale for a hooded Smock, Windproof, 1963 Pattern, issued only to special forces.

In 1966, the Army introduced, though not universally, a camouflage field uniform.

Known informally as the 1966 Pattern, it was identical in design to the 1960 Pattern kit, though now made in DPM fabric. It is labelled, like the earlier plain olive green version, Smock, Combat, 1960 Pattern and Trousers, Combat, 1960 Pattern.

The 1966 DPM range did not completely replace the plain olive green 1960 Pattern Smock and Trousers, which continued to be worn widely until the 1968 DPM kit was issued. Both the Royal Marines and the Parachute Regiment continued to wear the Trousers, Combat, 1960 Pattern with the Denison smock. Examples of these trousers were made even after 1968.

In the mid to late 1970s, these units eventually stopped issuing the Denison smock, and adopted smocks in the general-issue DPM, while for a time still wearing the plain olive 1960 Pattern Trousers.

=== The 1968 Pattern range—first general use ===
Before the 1966 Pattern equipment reached all units, a slightly revised design of Smock, Combat and Trousers, Combat were introduced as the 1968 Pattern range. The 1966 Pattern DPM fabric design was changed very little for the 1968 issue, and it seems that the 1968 Pattern garments were made for some time in the two very similar DPM fabrics. A Hood, Combat, DPM, made of DPM cotton fabric and with a plain olive green lining, was included in the range, fastened as required to the back of the Smock with the two epaulette buttons and a third under the collar.

In doing this, the British Army was the first to adopt a camouflage uniform universally.

For the Royal Marines, which had a responsibility for NATO's northern flank, a Smock, Windproof, Arctic and Trousers, Windproof, Arctic were introduced circa 1972. These were made in a lightweight, but wind-proof, DPM fabric and could be worn over quilted jacket and trousers in extreme cold conditions. The design of both smock and trousers differ radically from both the standard and para designs. The smock is long and loose-fitting, and incorporates a voluminous wired-rim hood. The trousers have zips in the lower leg to allow them to be put on over boots.

In the mid-1970s a new Smock Parachutist DPM (Para smock) was introduced for the Parachute Regiment and other airborne units. Though made in the 1968 Pattern cotton fabric, its design was closer to that of its predecessor, the Denison smock.

At the same time a Smock, Sniper, was introduced, based heavily on the Smock Parachutist DPM and sharing many of its details. It was distinguished by its padded elbows and shoulders, relocated lower pockets, multiple loops for securing natural camouflage material, and hooks for the rifle sling.

In the late 1970s, batches of the 1968 Pattern camouflage were used by the USAF Police Tactical Neutralisation Teams at RAF Upper Heyford as a temporary stand-in for the ERDL/M81 Woodland fatigues.

=== Later developments ===
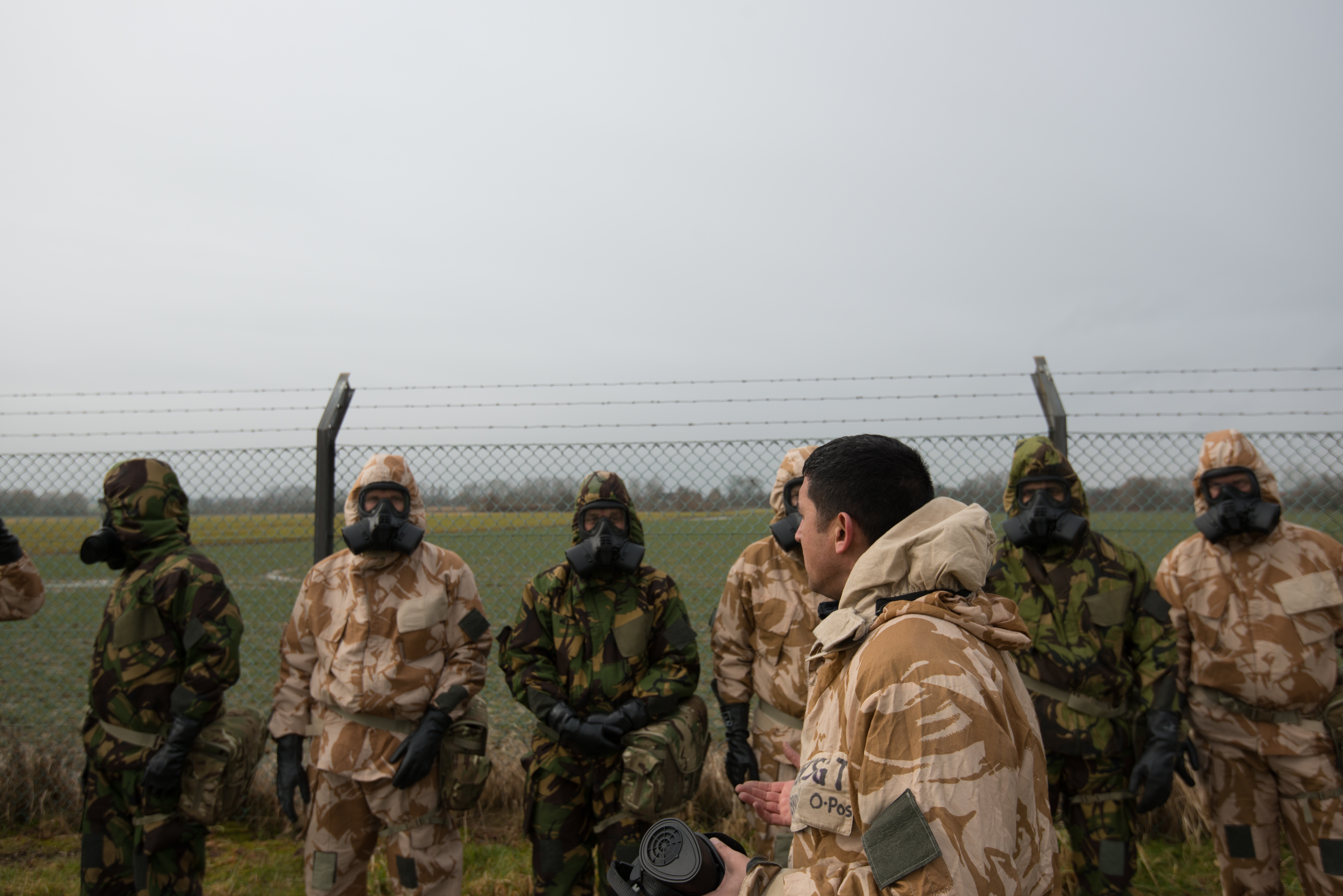
Members of the British armed forces wearing NBC suits in desert and temperate variants of the DPM in 2015.

The pattern was changed slightly with subsequent issues. On early 1960 Pattern, manufactured from 1966, and 1968 Pattern DPM uniforms, the sand coloured base would appear to lighten in tone at night, becoming dangerously conspicuous. This was addressed in the late 1970s, when the sand and brown colours were slightly darkened.

The 1985 pattern has fewer, less precise dots and the brown is much darker. The 1990 pattern and later has a band of new shapes and is smaller. The 1994 pattern has an orangey colour instead of a tan.

Tropical poly-cotton DPM uniforms varied even more. Early versions were very brightly coloured, notably with a russet brown and emerald green, which faded to rather unexpected pastel tones of blueish green and pink-brown with washing. Late 1970s and early 1980s Tropicals have a more yellowish sand base and are greatly sought after by those wishing to appear stylish. In the early 1990s, the final production style used colours closer to temperate uniforms.

DPM items in the Combat Soldier 95 clothing system have similar colours to the 1966 uniform. Instead of all four colours being printed onto a whitish base, the material is woven in the sand shade and overprinted only with three colours. This leads to a loss in contrast between the colours after washing and wear. The clothing tends to appear darker when wet than previous types did.

Although slight changes have been made to DPM and the colours, the pattern is easy to recognise. There are jungle versions of DPM where the colours are brighter. On one variation, the tan is darker than the green.

From 1990 a system of personal load carrying equipment was introduced, initially produced in olive green. The olive type was quickly replaced in production by a disruptively patterned version. Now almost all British issue webbing and rucksacks are disruptively patterned in the Multi-Terrain Pattern (MTP).

Current issued DPM equipment is IRR (Infrared Reflective) coated. This coating has a specific reflective wavelength in order to blend in with natural colours in the infra-red light spectrum. This reduces the visibility of soldiers to night vision devices, which detect infra-red light, as trees and other green plants reflect deep red and infra-red light (the Wood Effect).

==== Desert variants ====
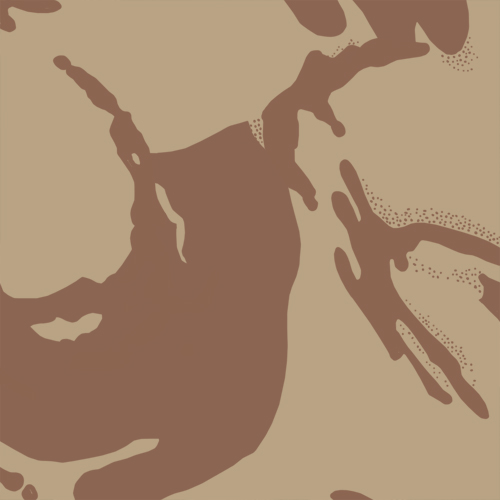
A desert DPM camouflage pattern sample.

In the late 1980s, a desert variant was first issued on a limited basis, consisting of subdued sand and khaki hues. By 1990, it was replaced by a two-colour light brown on sand version, because four-colour (light and dark browns, khaki, and sand) versions had been adopted by some Middle Eastern countries, notably Kuwait and the Iraqi Republican Guard.

A variant including a shade of green is currently worn by members of the Indonesian National Armed Forces assigned to the Garuda Contingent serving in the United Nations peacekeeping missions.

A three colour (reddish brown, khaki, and sand) version exists, and was worn by Syrian forces, Lebanese Forces, and the Saudi Arabian National Guard.

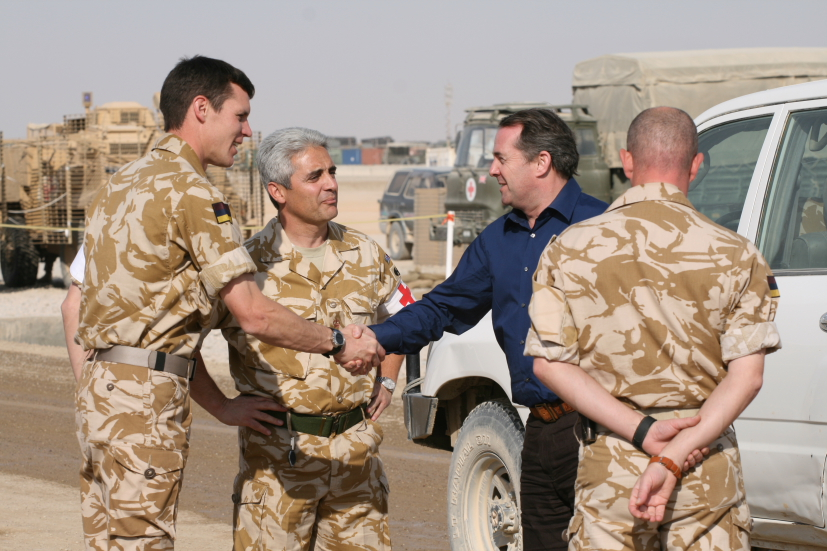
British troops wearing two-colour No.5 Desert Combat Dress in 2007.

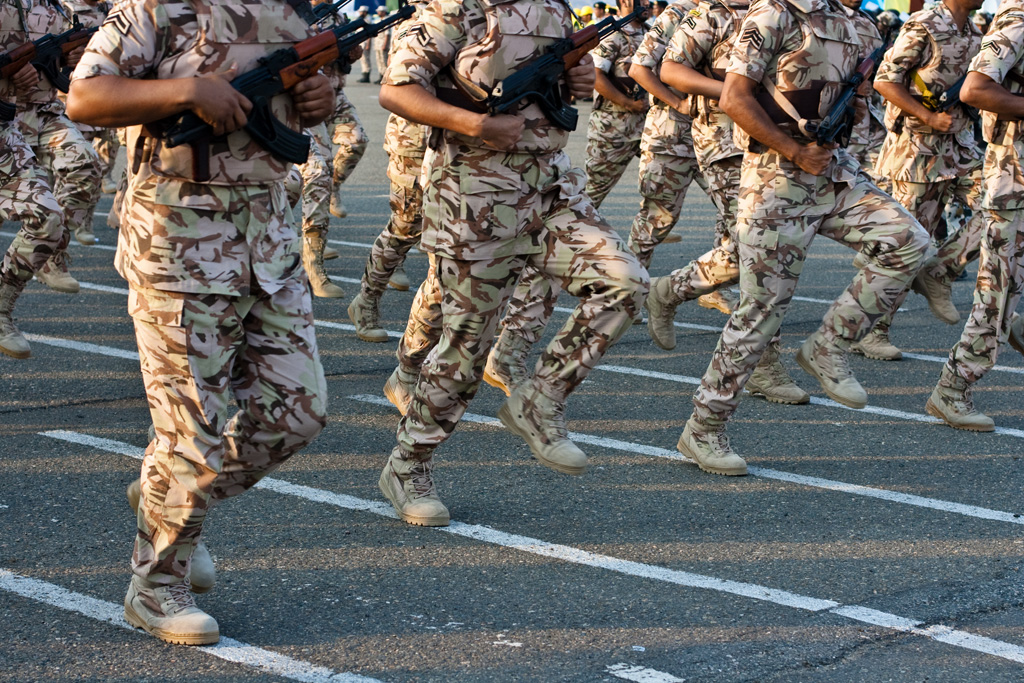
Saudi Arabia National Guardsmen run past in three-colour desert DPM.

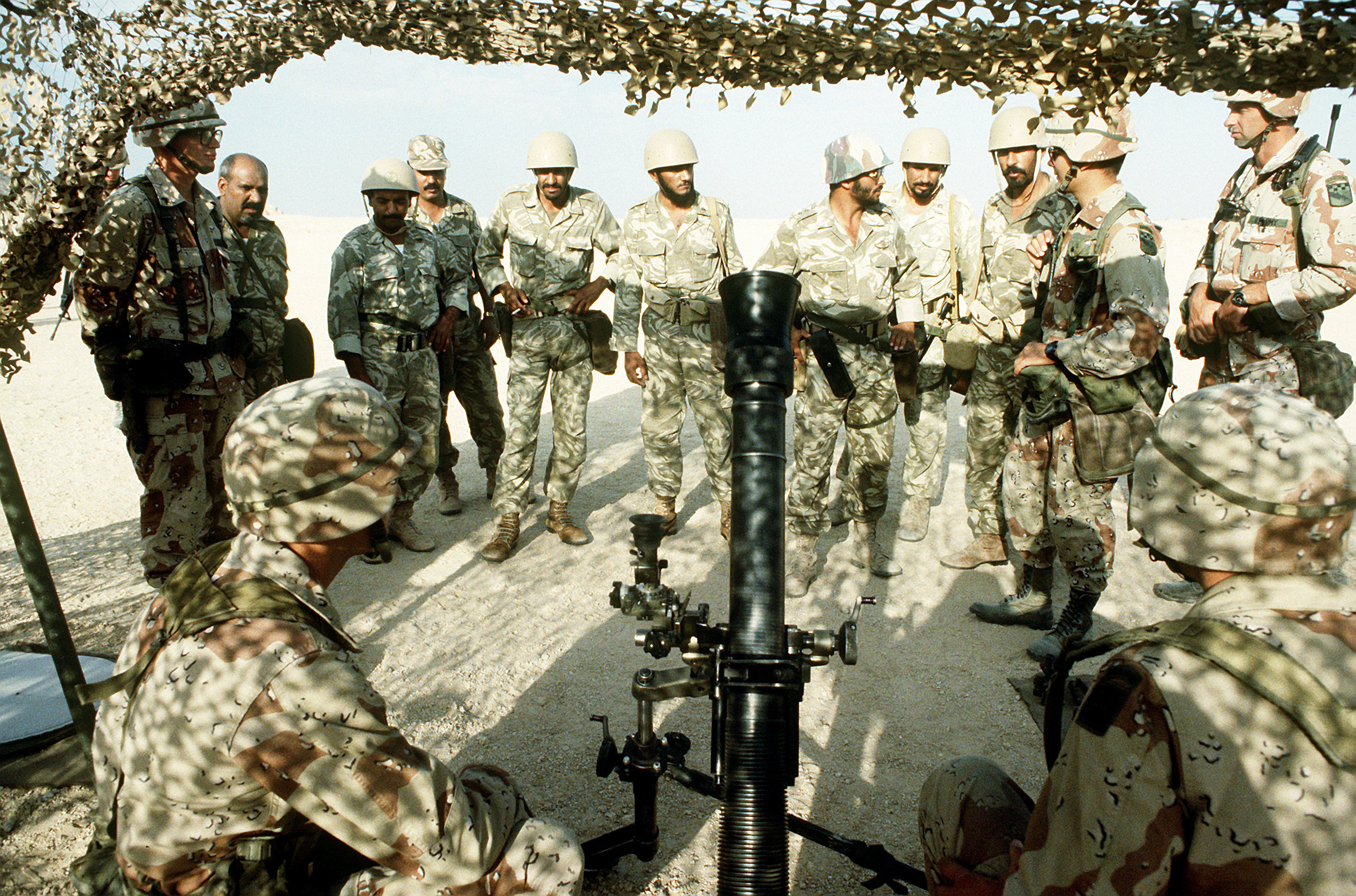
Saudi Arabian National Guardsmen wearing three-colour desert DPM during Operation Desert Shield.

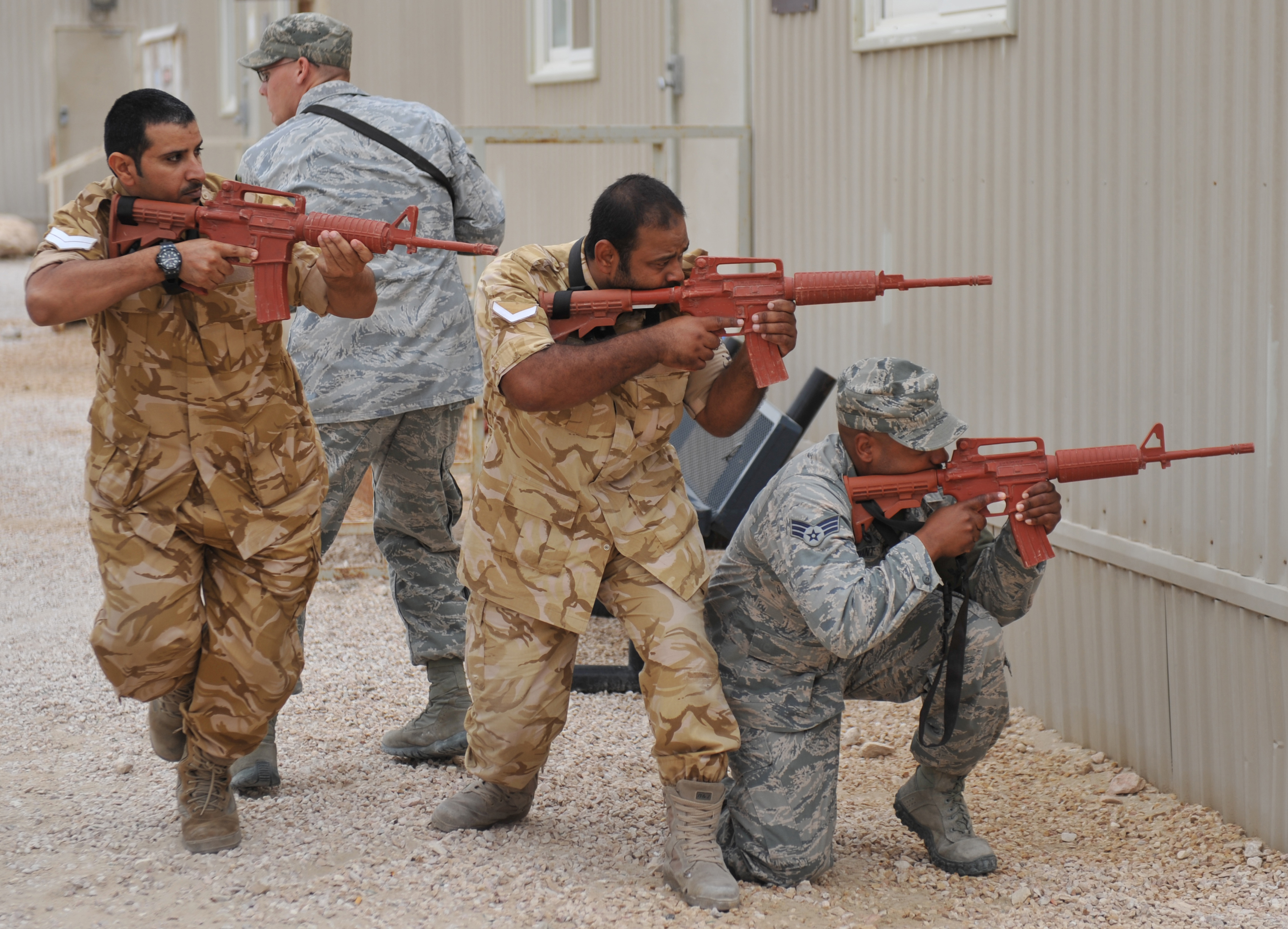
Examples of a four-colour desert variant of DPM.

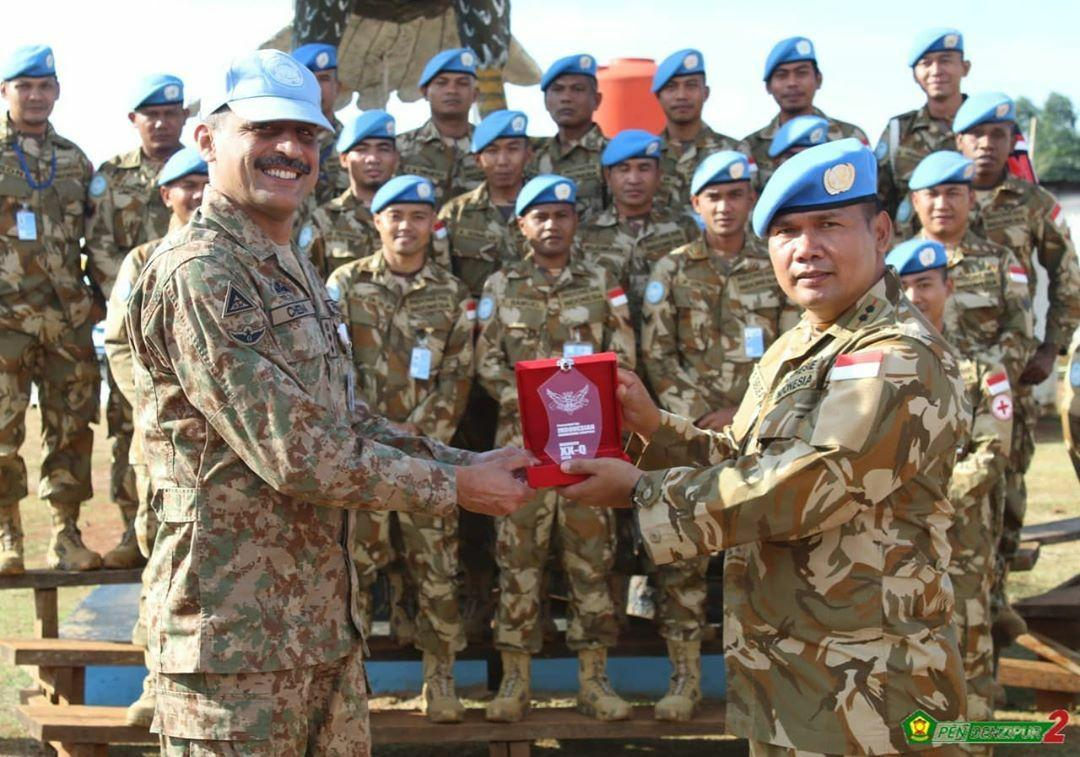
Multiple examples of the Indonesian four-colour variant of desert DPM

== Variants ==
=== GVT M93 ===
A development of DPM used by the Armed forces of the Netherlands

== Users ==
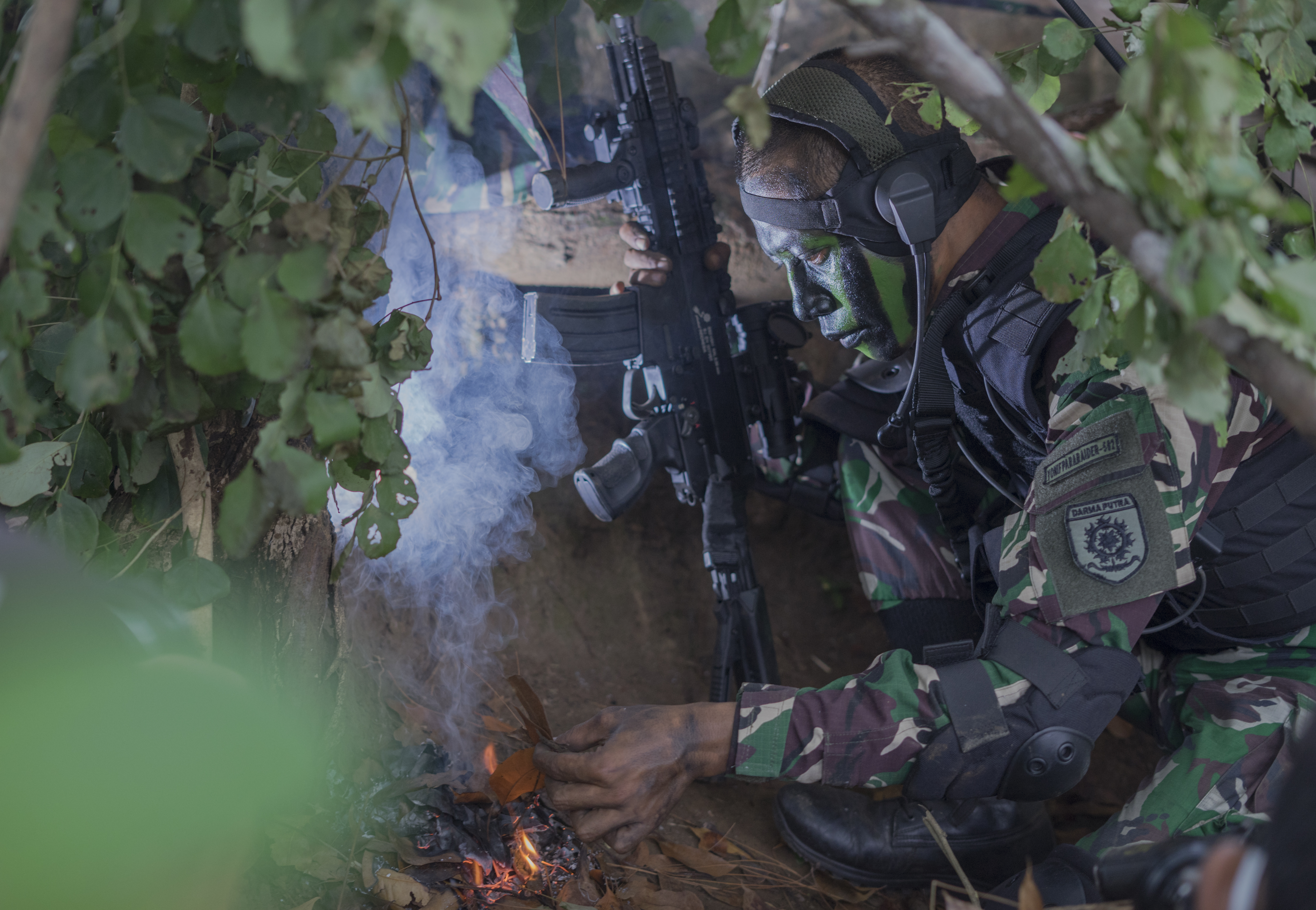
Indonesian National Armed Forces DPM camo worn by Indonesian Army Kostrad soldier, also known as 'Loreng Malvinas' or 'Malvinas Camo'

=== Current ===
- Botswana: Used by Botswana Defence Force.
- Bulgaria: Known as M2003 DPM.
- Cambodia: Used Indonesian DPMs by the 911th Special Forces Regiment. Cambodian-made DPMs used by the Cambodian Army.
- Georgia: Used by Georgian Special Operations Command.
- Greece: Some used by Greek special forces units.
- Hong Kong: Used by the Hong Kong Police Force.
- Indonesia: Used by the Indonesian National Armed Forces (TNI) since 1984 as standard issue, which was done under the order of then General Benny Moerdani. Arid version used for desert terrain. Digital version of the DPM made for soldiers graduating into Raider Battalions in December 2003. The camo is now being phased out in October 2025 in favor of a modified Army Strategic Command (Kostrad) camo scheme.
- India: Uses Indian-made DPMs, currently only used by Air Force personnel. This is to be replaced by a digital camouflage pattern adopted in 2022.
- Iran: Desert DPM is a standard use uniform in Iran's Army and Revolutionary Guard.
- Jamaica: DPM camo used by the Jamaica Defence Force since 1992 will be replaced by Hypersteath's Digital Combat Uniform.
- Kenya: Used by Kenya Defence Forces.
- Lesotho: Used by Lesotho Defence Force.
- Malawi
- North Korea: DPM camo used by Border Guards.
- Oman: Used by the Omani military, using the British DPM as a basis by using orange and light khaki colors with the light khaki changed to light orange in the 1990s.
- Papua New Guinea: The Papua New Guinean military uses the Kumul DPM pattern, which are produced under contract by Platatac.
- Philippines: The Filipino-made DPM used by the Armed Forces of the Philippines (AFP), colloquially referred to as the BDA (Battle Dress Attire) Pattern, is being incrementally replaced by Philippine Army Pattern (PHILARPAT) beginning in 2016, after it received official patent in the Philippines in the same year.
- Qatar: Desert DPM camos used by Qatari military.
- Russia: DPM clones known as Smog.
- Serbia: Used by the SAJ only in operations outside cities/towns.
- Sri Lanka: Special Task Force.

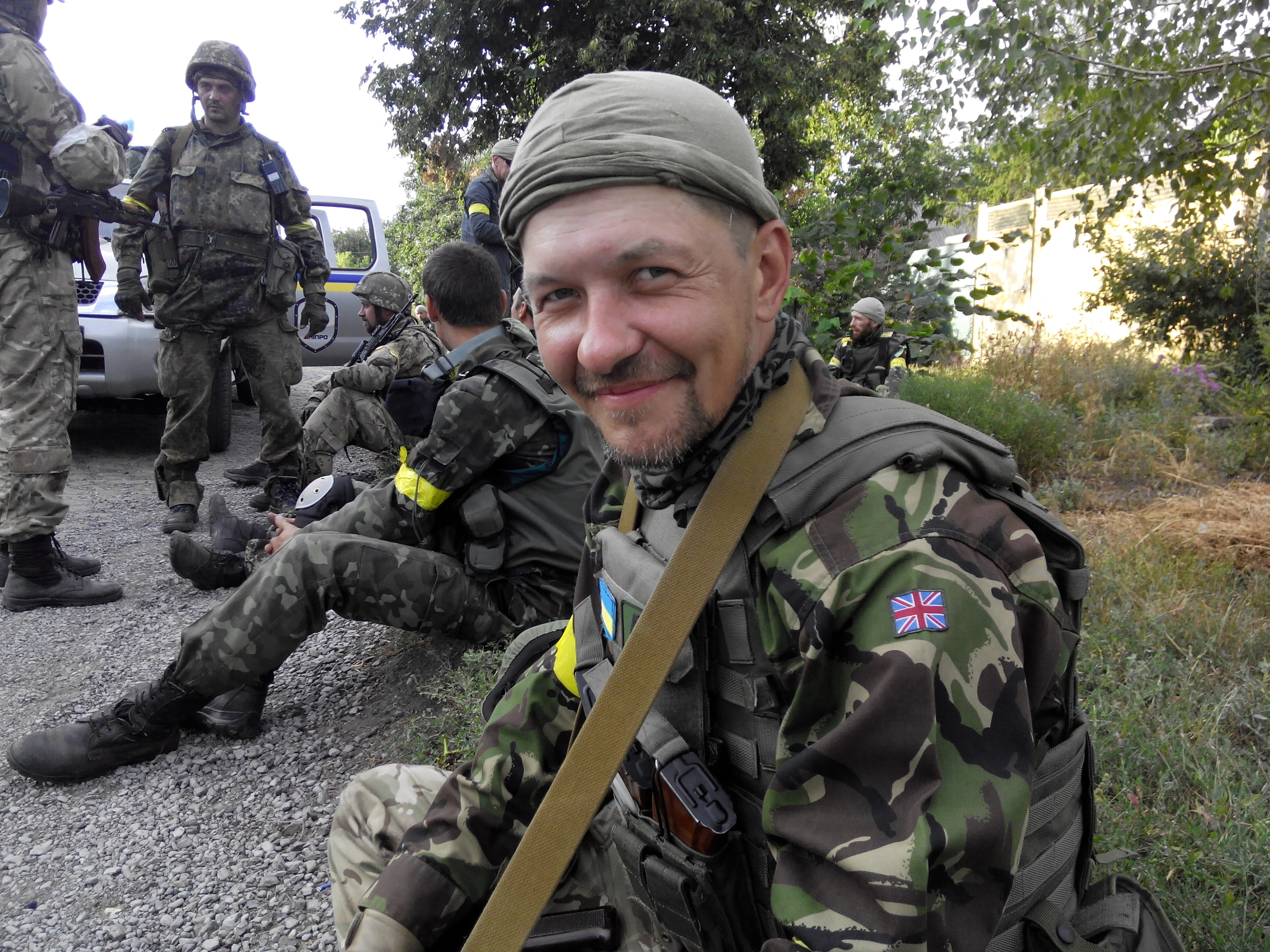
Ukrainian volunteer of the Dnipro-1 Regiment wearing a British-donated DPM uniform, 2014

- Ukraine: Used by the Ukrainian military. Surplus donated after the beginning of the War in Donbas.
- United Kingdom: Blue DPM used by British soldiers in OPFOR roles since 2015, and certain Cadet units still wear the pattern.
- Vanuatu: DPM used by Vanuatu Mobile Forces.

=== Former ===
- Argentina: DPM clone known as 'Camuflaje Patagonico used by Argentine troops deployed in the Patagonia and Cordillerana regions.
- Australia: Formerly used by Royal Australian Air Force from 1970s-1980s.
- Bahrain: Used both green and desert-type DPM until 2013 when they were replaced by digital patterns.
- Bangladesh: Used an indigenous variant of the DPM.
- Bophuthatswana: Used on military uniforms.
- Brunei: Replaced by Digital Disruptive Pattern-based BDUs made by Force-21 equipment in 2011.
- Canada: Known to be used by airborne-trained soldiers. Small number of Desert DPMs bought for Canadian soldiers involved in UNIKOM.
- China: Used by Special Forces DPM pattern similar to that worn by the Philippines. Known to wear digital patterns based on said pattern.
- Croatia
- Iraq: Known to be formerly used by the Iraqi military.
- Ireland: Formerly used by the Army Ranger Wing from the 1980s to 1990s. like the rest of the Irish Defense Forces, began to be issued with the Irish DPM.
- Kuwait
- Malaysia: Used from surplus DPM British by Malaysian peacekeepers during UNPROFOR SFOR and IFOR in Bosnian War
- Netherlands: From 1991 to 2011, known as M91 DPM. Some still in operational use.
- New Zealand: From 1980 to 2013. See New Zealand disruptive pattern material for more details.
  - Formerly used a New Zealand version of the Desert DPM.
- Norway: Used by Special Forces until replaced by Multicam in early 2000s
- Pakistan: DPM-based camos used by the SSG.
- Philippines: Red DPM formerly used by Philippine Coast Guard.
- Portugal: Adopted to replace their Lizard camo uniforms in the 1980s.
- Romania: Used DPM until 2017.
- Saudi Arabia: Saudi Arabian National Guard used three-color desert and black DPM.
- Sierra Leone
- Union of South Africa: Hunter Group and 32 Battalion operators use DPM-based clothing/gear in the South African Border War.
- Slovenia
- Sri Lanka: Used by the Sri Lanka Army Commando Regiment.

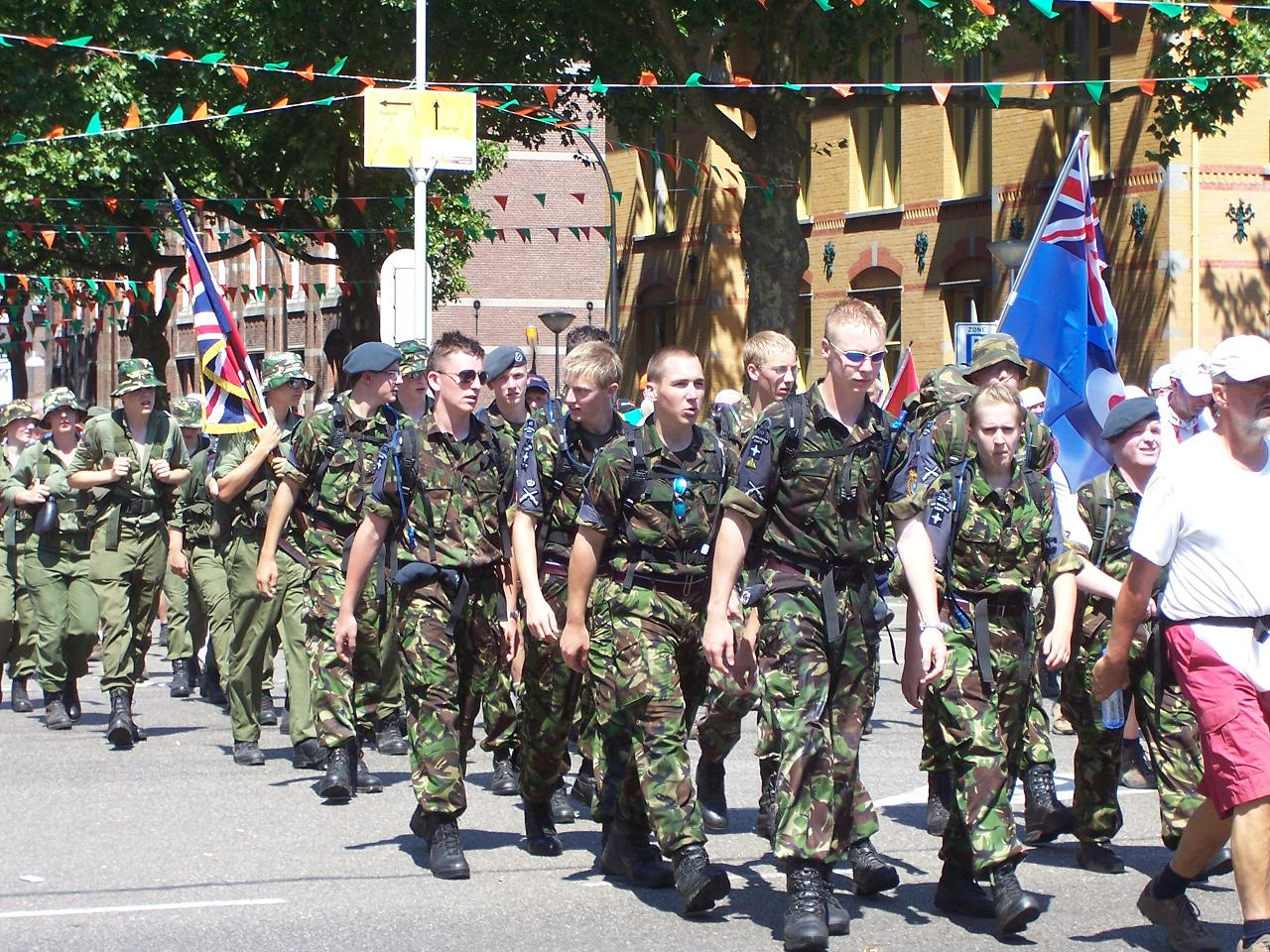
Cadets of the British Air Training Corps wearing temperate DPM, with the addition of brassards.

- Syria: Locally developed copy used by the Syrian Army.
- Thailand: Used by Thai special forces.
- United Kingdom: Desert and woodland patterns used by British Armed Forces, the former used by OPFOR units after the Gulf War. Woodland pattern also used by cadet forces until the adoption of Multi-Terrain Pattern.
  - British Hong Kong:
    - Formerly used by The Royal Hong Kong Regiment (The Volunteers).
    - Formerly used by The Hong Kong Military Service Corps.
- Uzbekistan: Gray DPM formerly used by Uzbek special forces from 2006.
- Yemen
- Republic of Srpska: British DPM used from 1992 to 1997.

=== Non-State Actors ===
- Donetsk People's Republic
- Known to be used by anti-Assad forces in Syria.
- Provisional Irish Republican Army

=== Others ===
- Used by the New Zealand Cadet Forces until 2023, now being phased out in favour of CWDs.
- Used by The Hong Kong Adventure Corps.

== Replacement ==
Multi-Terrain Pattern (MTP) is a six-colour camouflage pattern intended to replace both the four colour woodland DPM uniform and the desert pattern uniform used by the British Armed forces. MTP was procured and announced in late 2009, predicated around use in the Afghanistan theatre of operations but applicable to other theatres. A range of patterns were tried and evaluated in Britain, Cyprus, Kenya and Afghanistan against DPM, desert patterns and existing commercially available patterns. In April 2010, MTP combat uniforms began being issued to forces deployed in Afghanistan.

It was intended for DPM to be phased out completely for British Regular and Reserve forces by 2016. The jungle pattern DPM could still be retained by special forces for jungle operations.

== See also ==
- DPM Parachute Smock
- Smock Windproof DPM
- Combat uniform#United Kingdom
